= Schwarzenbach (Obere Argen) =

River in Germany

Location
- Country: Germany
- States: Baden-Württemberg; Bavaria

Physical characteristics
- Mouth
  - location: Obere Argen
  - coordinates: 47.6417°N 9.7606°E
- Length: 10.4 km (6.5 mi)

Basin features
- Progression: Obere Argen→ Argen→ Lake Constance→ Rhine→ North Sea

Schwarzenbach (German pronunciation: [ˈʃvaʁtsn̩ˌbax]) is a river of Baden-Württemberg and of Bavaria, Germany.

In its upper course, the Schwarzenbach forms the border between Baden-Württemberg and Bavaria. In Baden-Württemberg in the district Neuravensburg of Wangen im Allgäu, it flows from the left into the Obere Argen.

== See also ==
- List of rivers of Baden-Württemberg
- List of rivers of Bavaria
