= Argen =

River in Baden-Württemberg, Germany

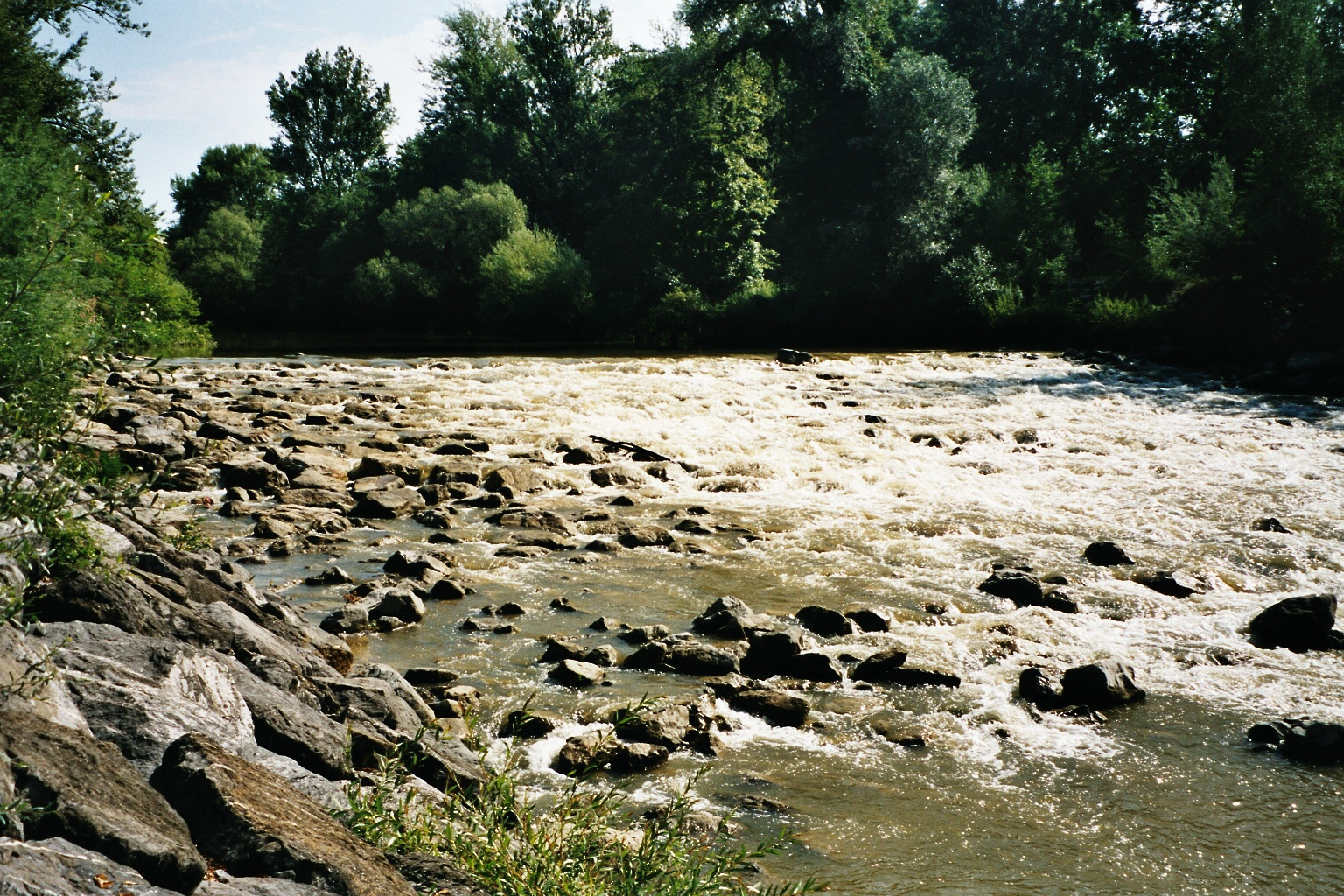
- The Argen upstream of the suspension bridge between Kressbronn am Bodensee and Langenargen

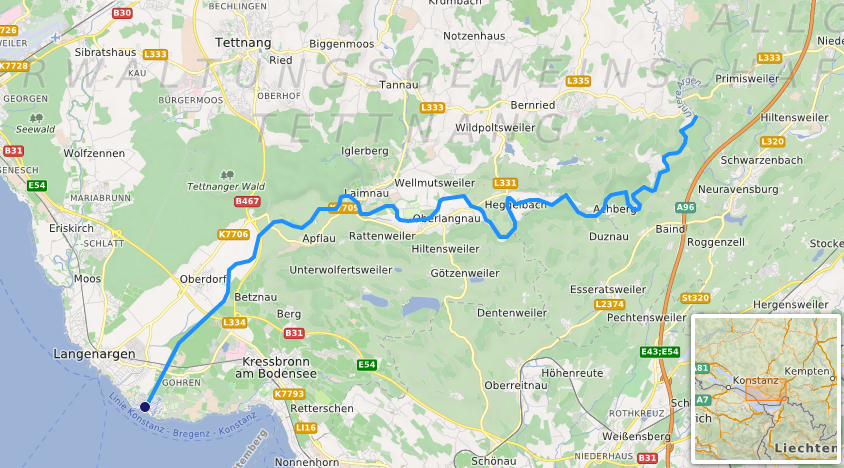

Location
- Country: Germany
- State: Baden-Württemberg
- Districts: Ravensburg and Bodenseekreis

Physical characteristics
- Source
  - location: Confluence of Untere Argen and Obere Argen, between Neukirch and Neuravensburg
  - coordinates: 47°39′17″N 9°44′40″E
  - elevation: 496 m (1,627 ft)
- Mouth
  - location: Into Lake Constance between Kressbronn am Bodensee and Langenargen
  - coordinates: 47°35′14″N 9°33′19″E
  - elevation: 395 m (1,296 ft)
- Length: 23.2 km (14.4 mi) (with Obere Argen 73.2 km or 45.5 mi)
- Basin size: 654 km^{2} (253 sq mi)
- Discharge
  - average: 20.5 m^{3}/s (720 cu ft/s)

Basin features
- Progression: Lake Constance→ Rhine→ North Sea
- Tributaries
  - right: Bollenbach

The Argen is a river in Baden-Württemberg, Germany. It flows into Lake Constance between Kressbronn am Bodensee and Langenargen as the third largest tributary to the lake. It is 23.4 kilometres (14.5 mi) long; if one includes the Obere Argen and its source river Seelesgraben, the combined length is 73.2 kilometres (45.5 mi).

== Course ==
The headwaters of the Argen arise in the Allgäu. There are two headwaters: the Obere Argen and the Untere Argen. The two arms wrap around the Große Kreisstadt of Wangen im Allgäu and meet each other in the Neuravensburg district of Wangen im Allgäu.

=== Untere Argen ===
The origin of the Untere Argen is the confluence of Börlasbach and Stixnerbach at the western entrance to Missen at about 850 metres (2,790 ft) above sea level in the Allgäu region of Bavaria. From the confluence, it first flows north to Isny im Allgäu, then northwest to Waltershofen, then southwest to Primisweiler. Past Primisweiler, it merges with the Obere Argen.

The main tributaries are the Wengener Argen and the Haslach.

The Federal highway A96 crosses it a number of times.

=== Obere Argen ===
The Obere Argen originates in a marshy area north-west of Oberstaufen in the Allgäu. It initially flows through the Eistobel gorge, then underneath the Argentobelbrücke, and past Grünenbach towards Wangen im Allgäu. From there it flows on via Neuravensburg to Pflegelberg, where it is united with the Untere Argen.

=== Lower reaches ===
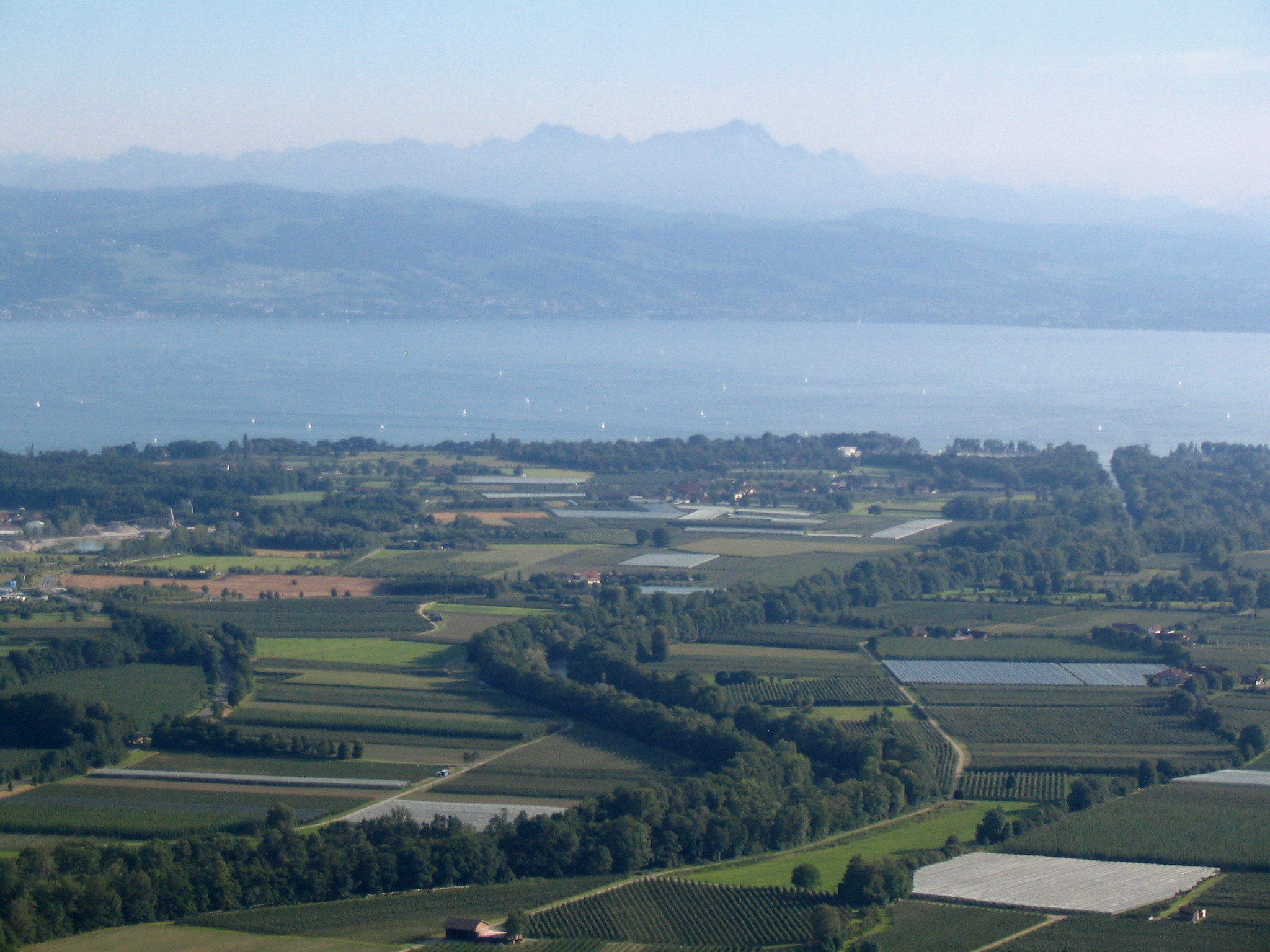
Lower reaches and mouth and between Kressbronn and Langenargen

Geomorphologically, the Argen has cut a deep and wide valley into the landscape, leading to such place names as Gitzensteig. In some places, the valley is over a kilometre wide. The edges of the valley occasionally rise steeply up to 100 metres (330 ft), and the valley floor is at the level of Lake Constance.

Further down its course, the river bed becomes increasingly broader. The river here flows past the villages of Laimnau, Apflau and Badhütten. In the lower part of its course, the Argen was straightened out considerably. It no longer has oxbow lakes because of the intensive valley agriculture. In recent years the massive concrete walls alongside the river have been replaced with large boulders in most of the shallower zones. Near the estuary at Kressbronn, gravel is mined in larger quantities, creating new lakes along the river.

==== Ruins ====
The ruins of several castles and palaces flank the lower reaches of the Argen: Altsummerau, Neusummerau, the late medieval Gießen Castle at Kreisbrunn, Achberg Castle and Neuravensburg Castle. Remains of an ancient hill fort can be found in the woods above the river.

=== Mouth ===
The mouth into Lake Constance is flanked on both sides by small harbours for pleasure boats. On the left is a camping grounds named Gohren. There is another camping ground with a restaurant at Laimnau. At its mouth, the Argen is 30 metres (98 ft) wide. To prevent flooding, several protective walls have been constructed along the river.

Kayaking is possible; bathing facilities are available.

== Level ==
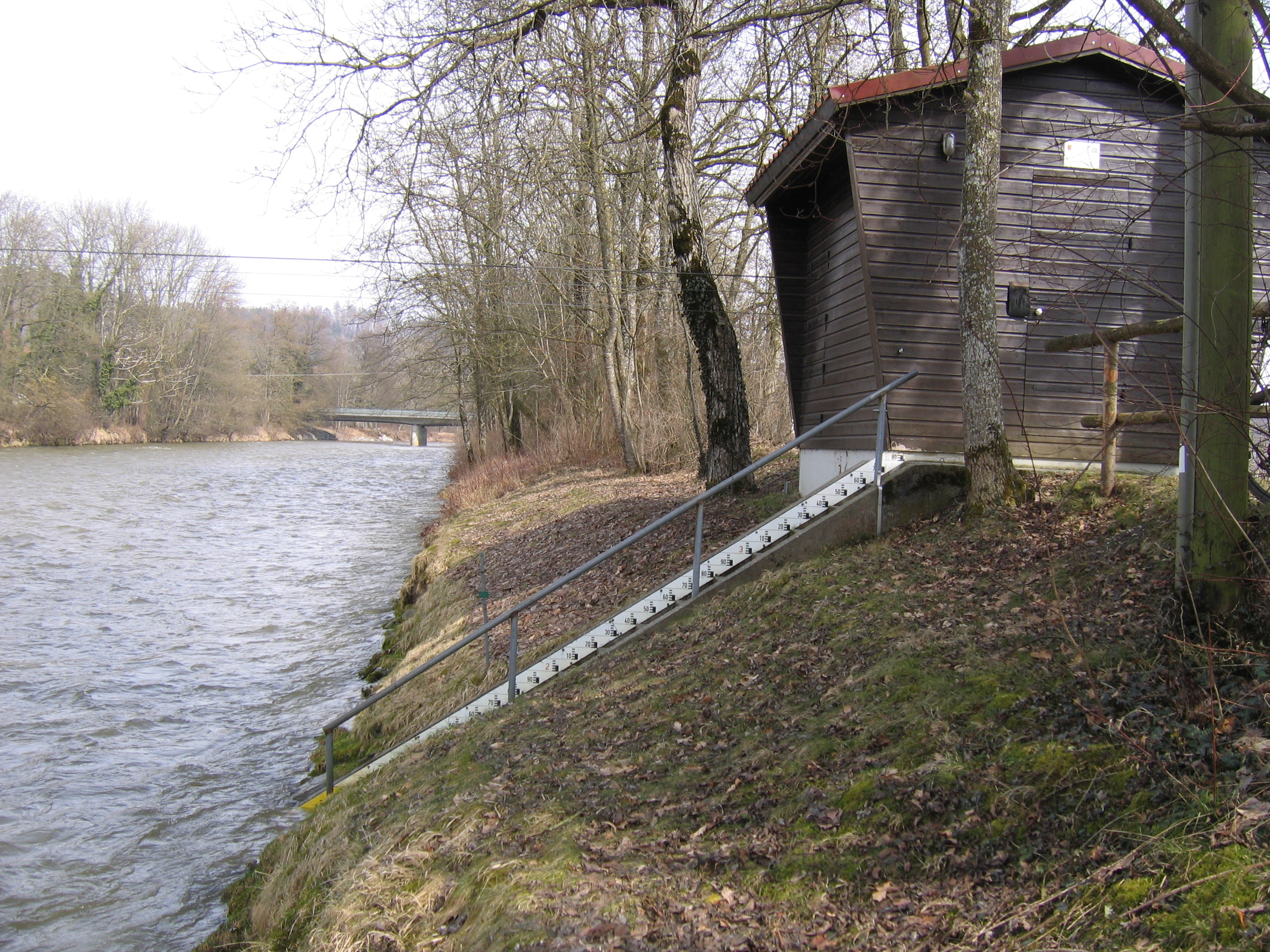
Level measuring station Pegel Gießen

About 200 metres (660 ft) below the Gießenbrücke bridge in Kressbronn (river km 5.8), a water level measuring station exists on the Kressbronn side of the river. It is operated by the "Flood Forecasting Centre Baden-Württemberg," the "State Institute for Environment, Measurements and Nature Conservation Baden-Württemberg," and by the Regierungsbezirk Tübingen. The zero level for this station is at an elevation of 420.13 metres (1,378.4 ft).

=== Statistical values ===
- Mean lowest water level 1980–2003: 0.29 metres (0.95 ft), 4.87 cubic metres per second (172 cu ft/s)
- Average water level in the years 1980–2003: 0.57 metres (1.9 ft), 20.50 cubic metres per second (724 cu ft/s)
- Historical record levels, flooding on 22 May 1999: 3.58 metres (11.7 ft)

== Nature reserve ==
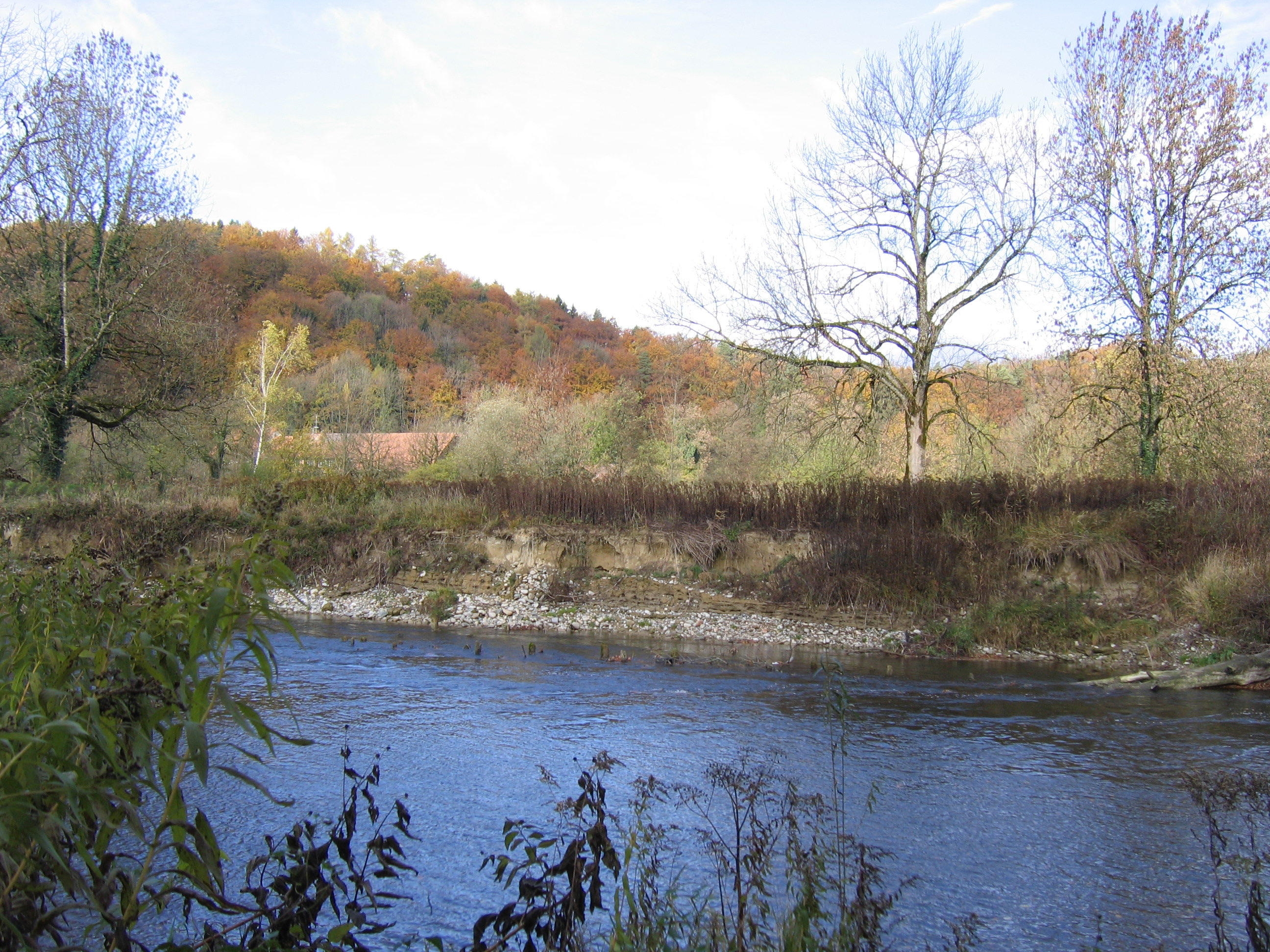
Bluffs above Gießenbrücke

An area of approximately 296 hectares (730 acres) flanking the Argen was declared a nature reserve by the regional council of Tübingen on 16 December 1997. Its official name is Naturschutzgebiet Argen and it is registered as reserve number 4282. The reserve covers the area between the confluence of the Obere and Untere Argen and the mouth into Lake Constance. It includes the river, steep slopes, floodplain forest and swamp forests, valleys and flood embankments. Of the total, 234.8 hectares (580 acres) of the reserve are in the Bodenseekreis district and 61.54 hectares (152.1 acres) in the Ravensburg district.

== History ==
In Alamannia, a Carolingian county named Argungowe (i.e. Argen County) was recorded from the end of the 8th century.

== Marathon ==
The roads along the Argen between Argensteg and Gießenbrücke are used in the annual Bodensee-Marathon. Runners must run on the road on the Kressbronn side to Gießenbrücke, cross the bridge and run along the river on the Langenargen side to Argensteg, then via Gohren to the finish at Kressbronn Lakeside Sports Hall.

== Gallery ==
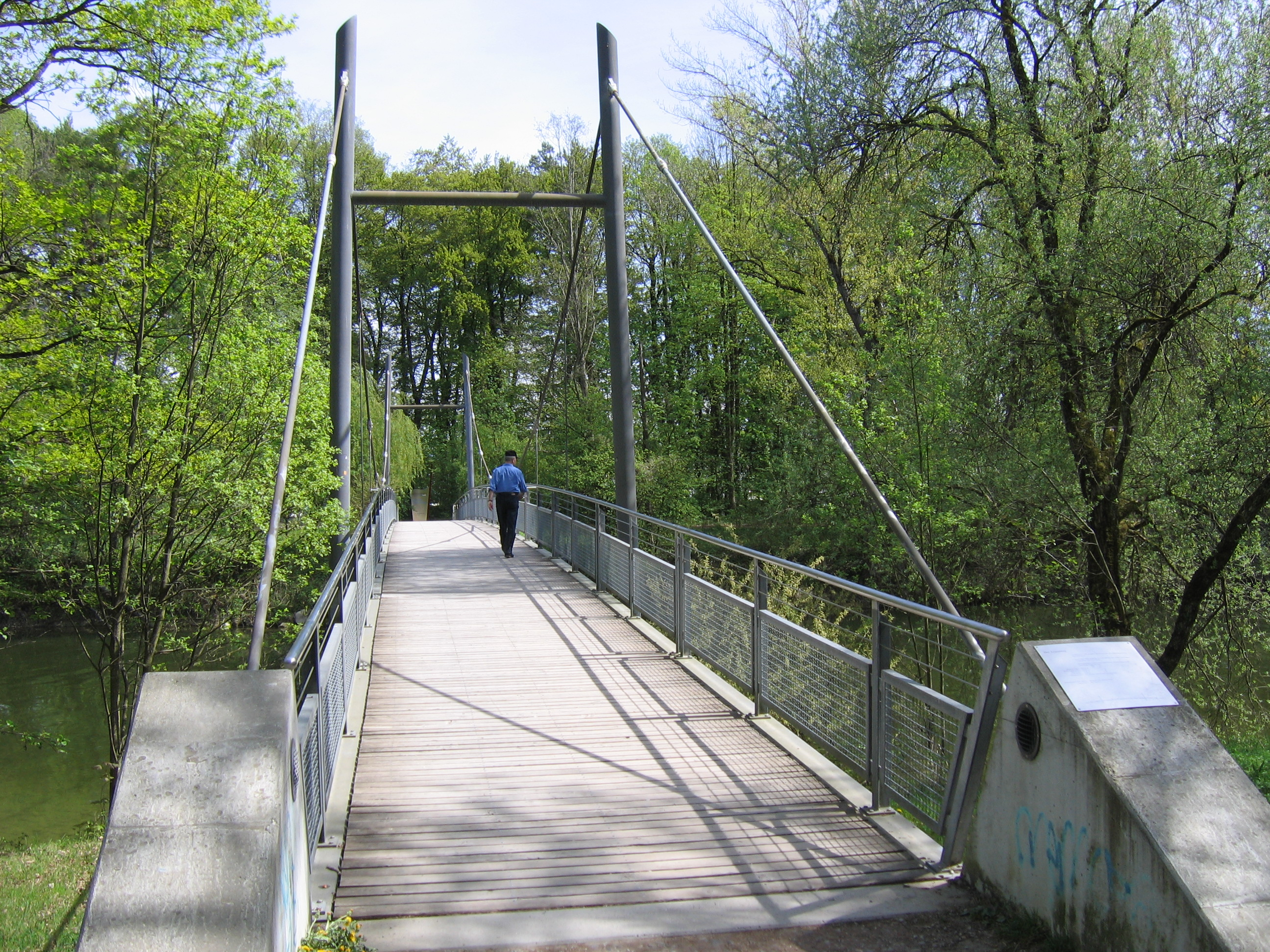
Argensteg

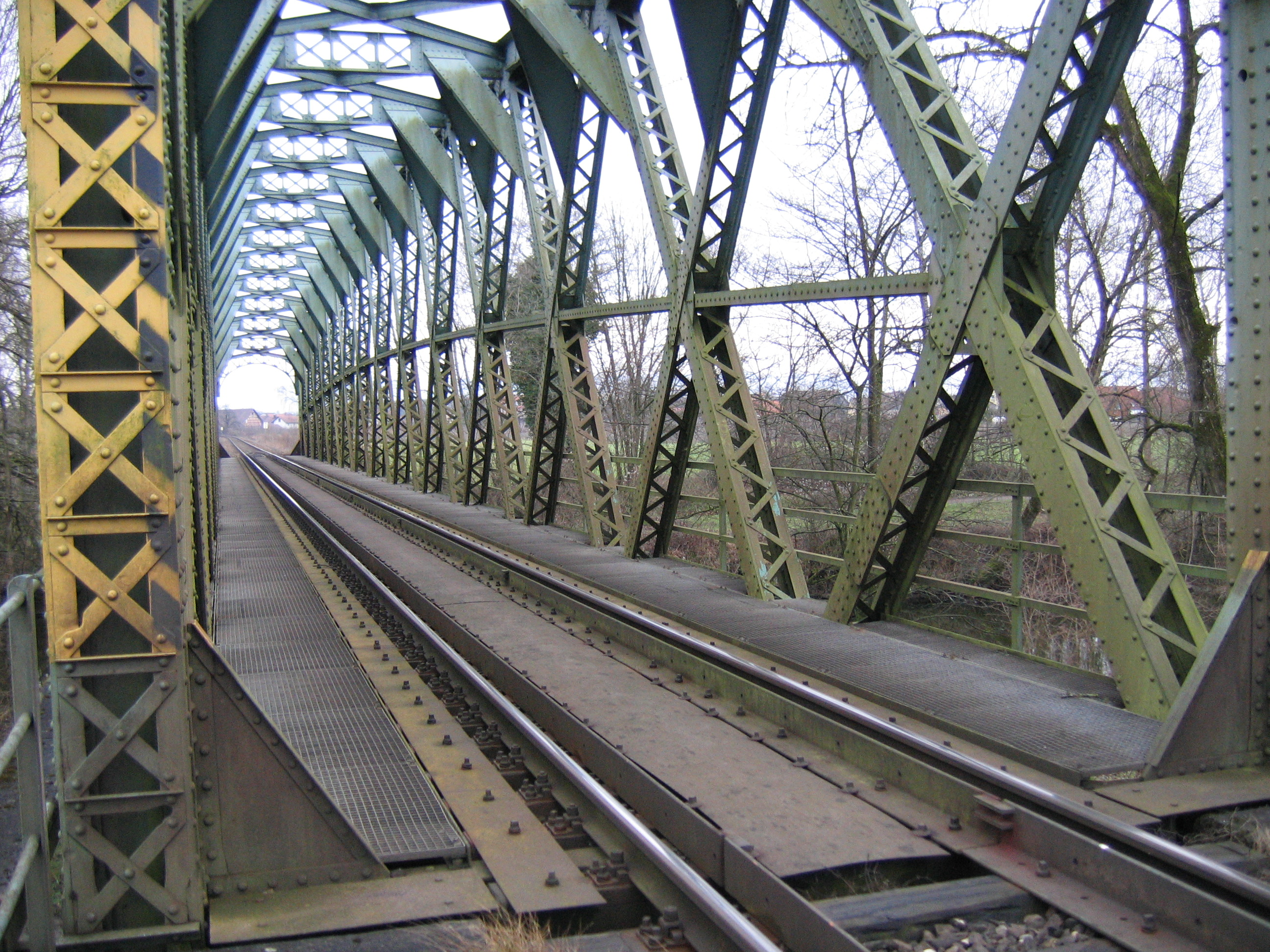
Lake Constance Belt Railway Bridge

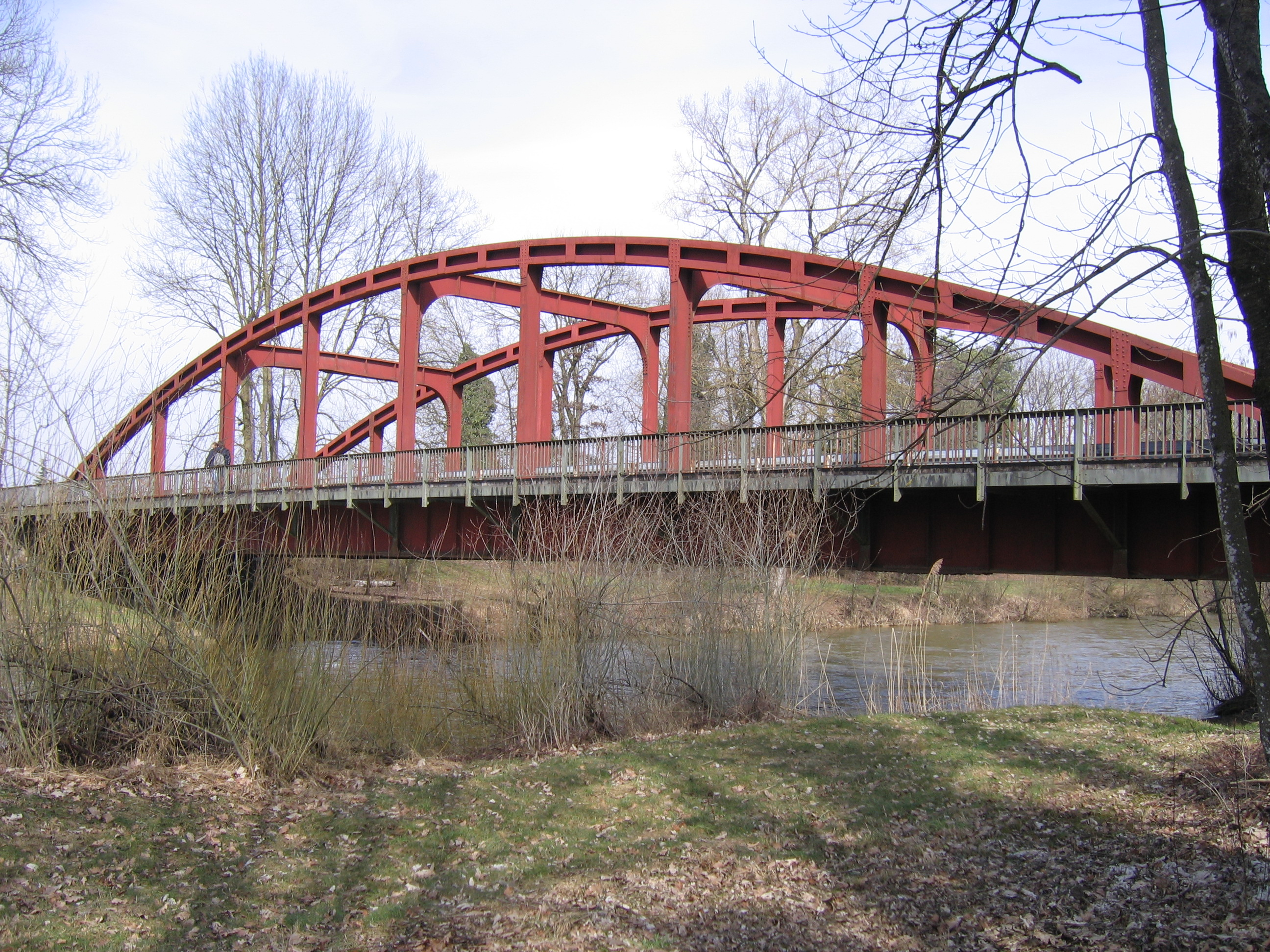
Kocher Bridge

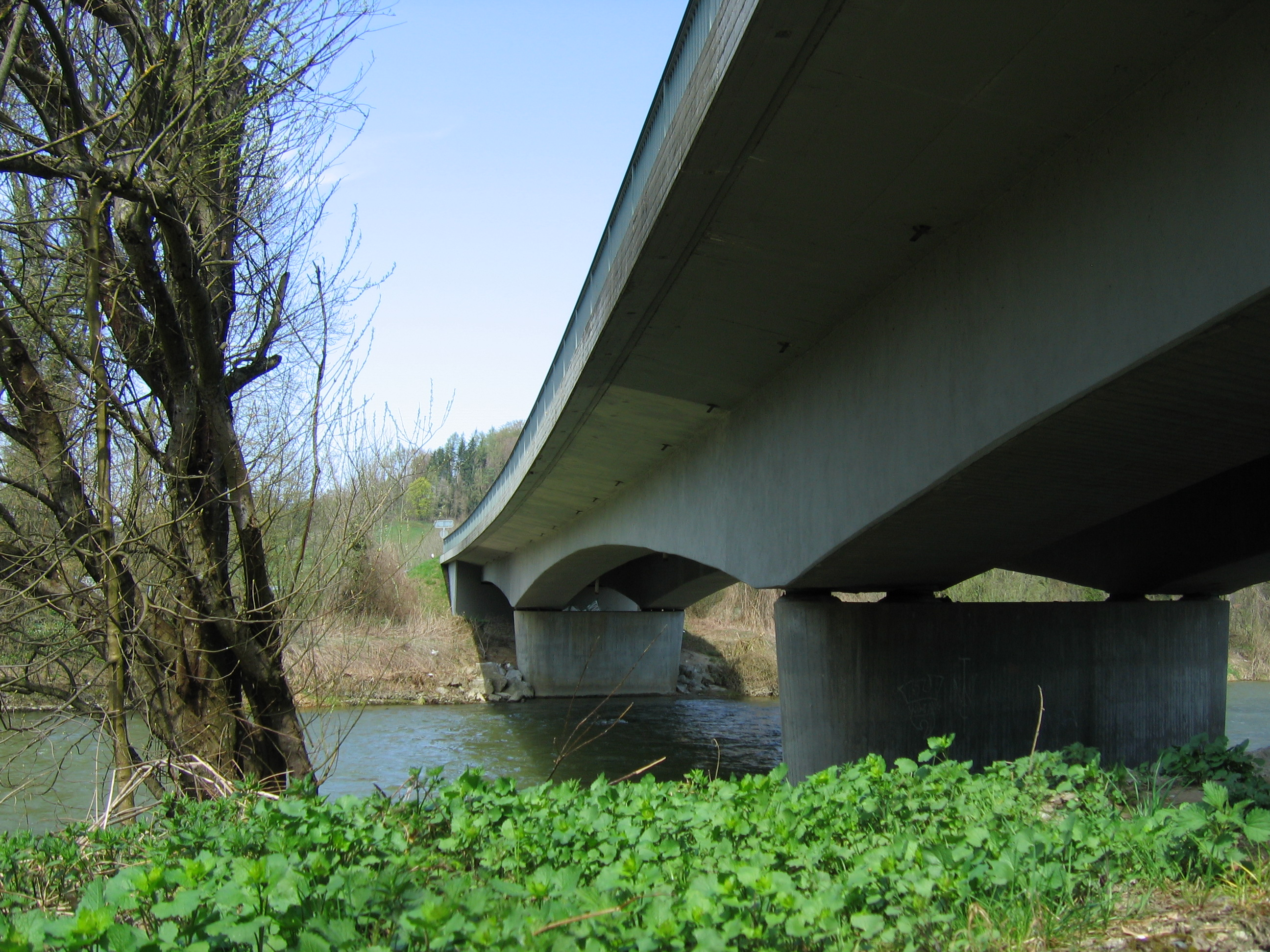
Federal Road B 467

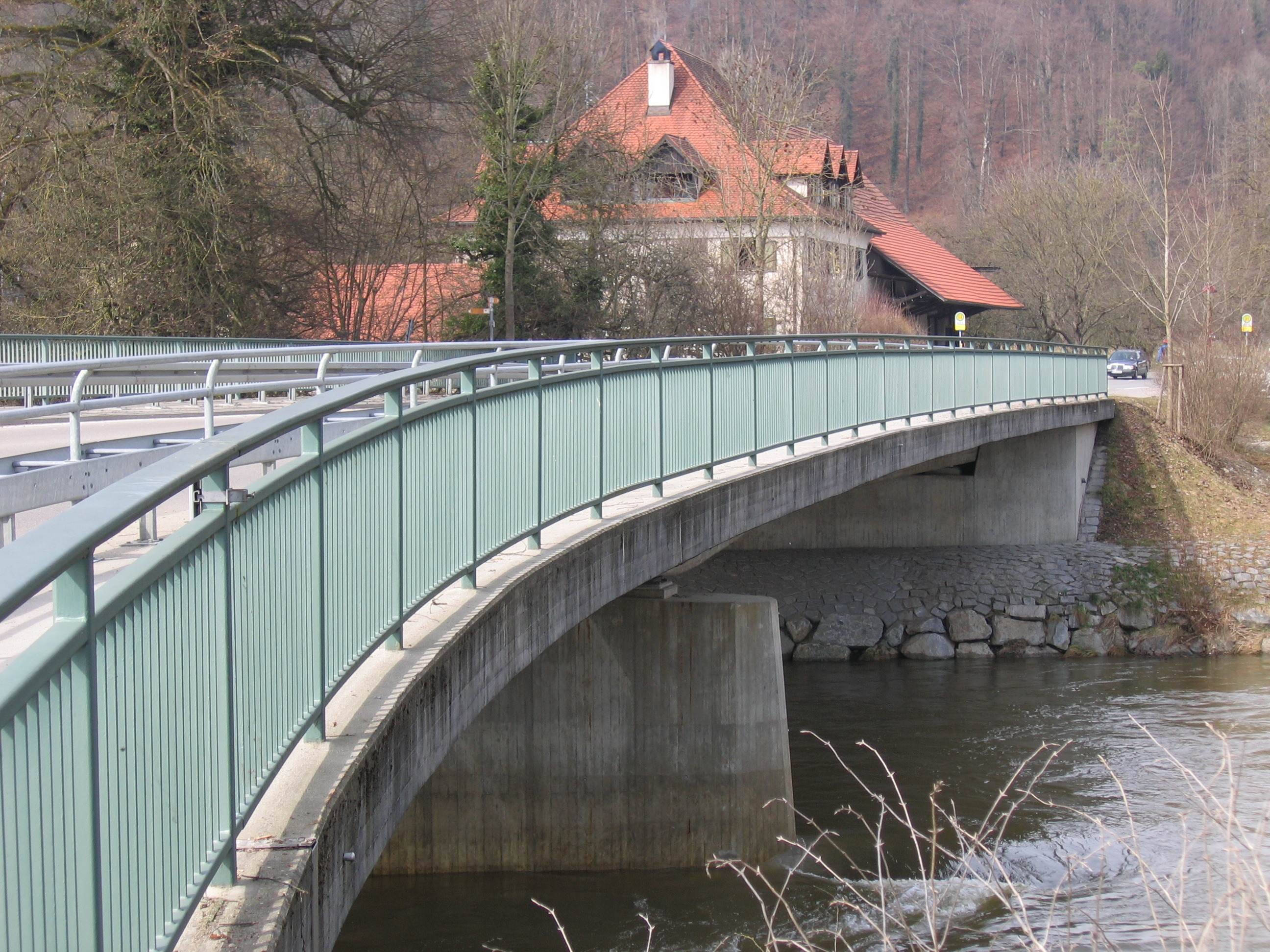
Gießen Bridge

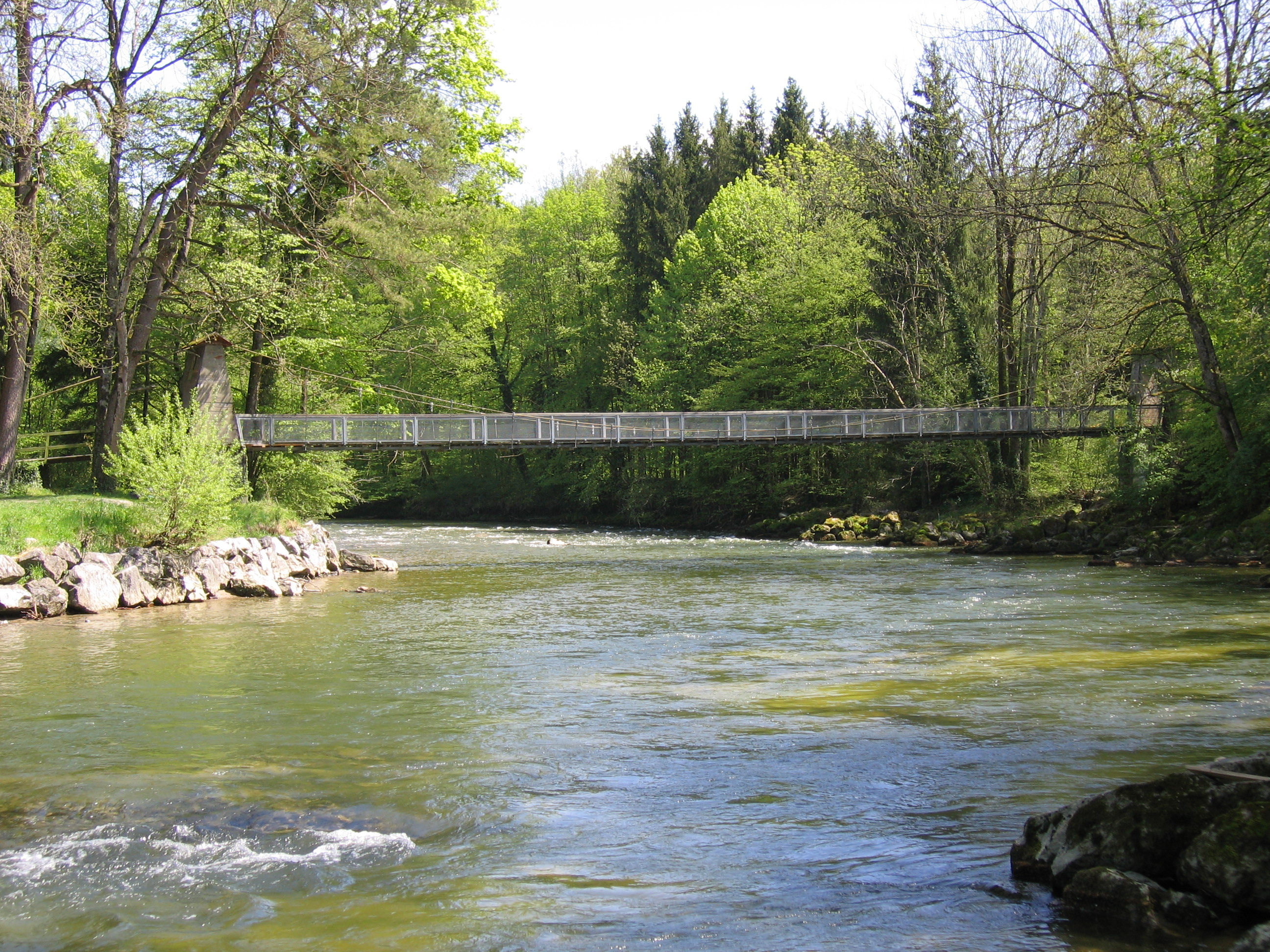
Bridge at Heggelbach

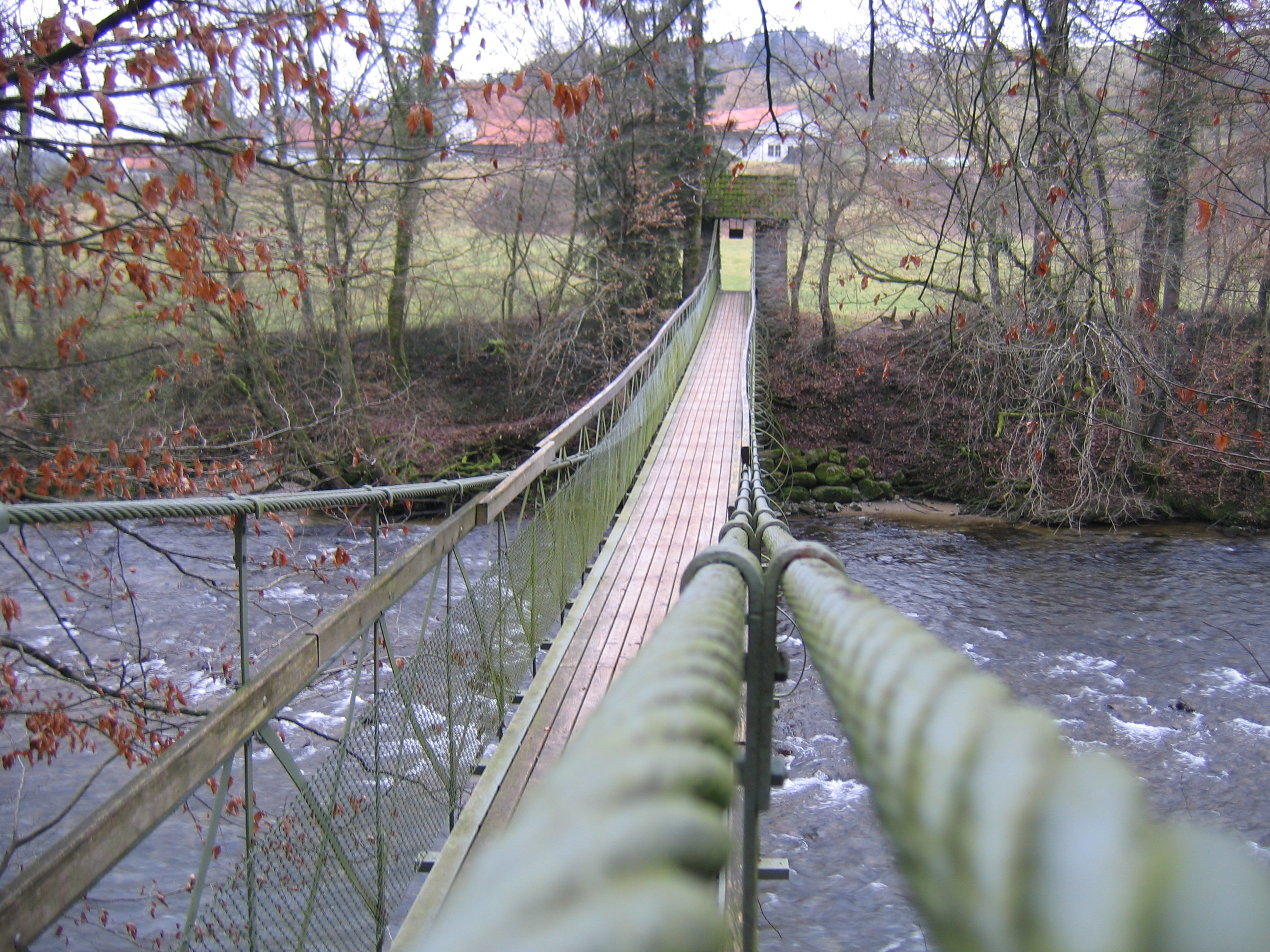
Bridge at Achberg Castle

== See also ==
- List of rivers of Baden-Württemberg
