= Untere Argen =

River in Germany

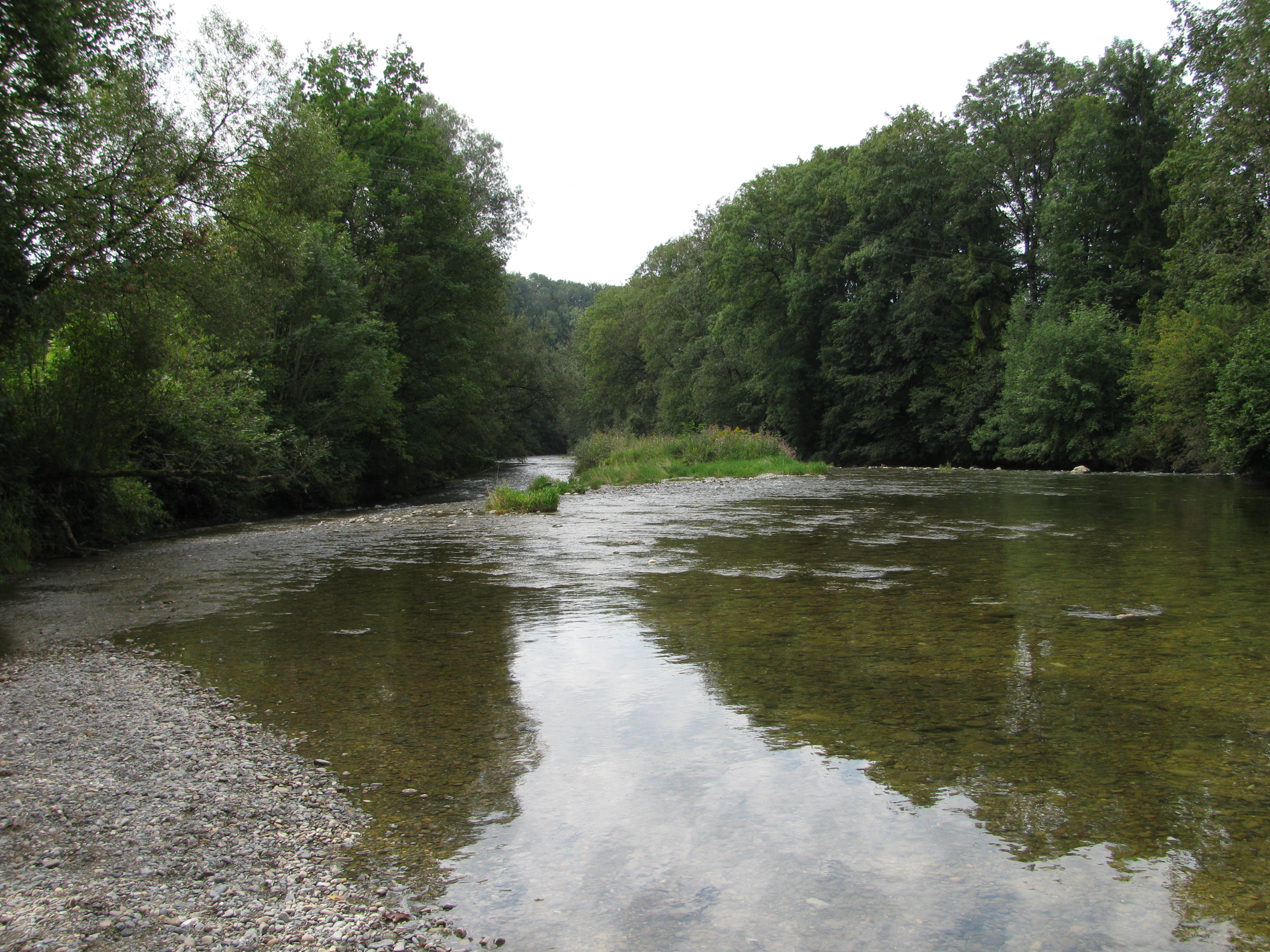
- Untere Argen between Bundesautobahn 96 and Geiselharz (Amtzell)

Location
- Country: Germany
- States: Baden-Württemberg; Bavaria

Physical characteristics
- Mouth
  - location: Confluence with the Obere Argen
  - coordinates: 47°39′17″N 9°44′40″E
  - elevation: 489 m above sea level (NN)
- Length: 70.1 km (43.6 mi)
- Basin size: 369 km^{2} (142 sq mi)

Basin features
- Progression: Argen→ Lake Constance→ Rhine→ North Sea

Untere Argen is a river of Baden-Württemberg and Bavaria, Germany. Its source is near the village Börlas (part of Missen-Wilhams) in southwestern Bavaria. It passes along Isny im Allgäu and Wangen im Allgäu. At its confluence with the Obere Argen near Neukirch, the Argen is formed.

== See also ==
- List of rivers of Baden-Württemberg
- List of rivers of Bavaria
