= Bundesstraße 31 =

Federal highway in Germany

B 31
- Bundesstraße 31

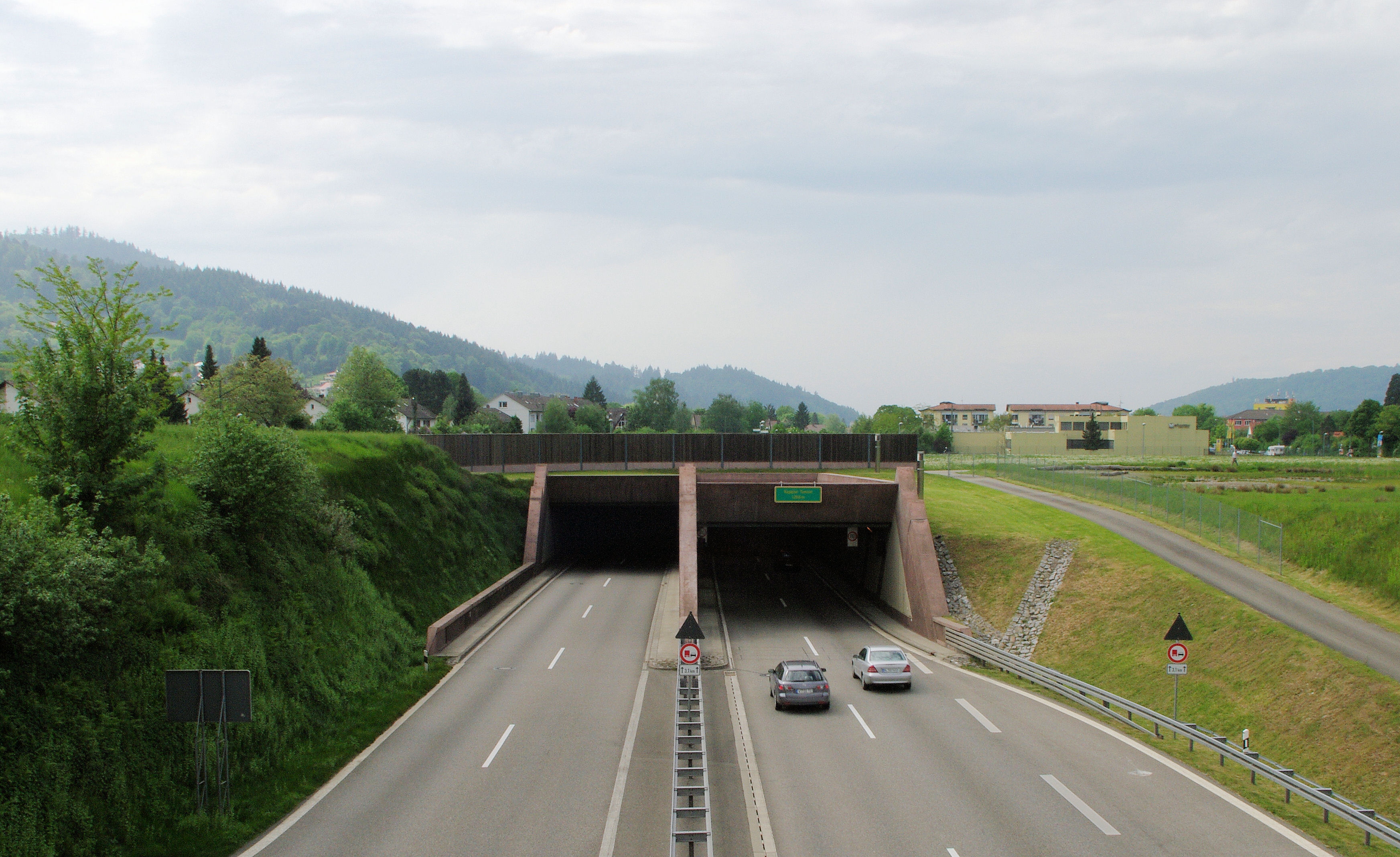
- Bundesstraße 31 near Freiburg

Route information
- Part of E54

Major junctions
- From: Breisach
- To: Weißensberg

Location
- Country: Germany
- States: Baden-Württemberg, Bavaria

Highway system
- Roads in Germany; Autobahns; List; Federal; List; State; E-roads

The Bundesstraße 31 (B 31) is a federal highway or Bundesstraße running from east to west in South Germany. It runs from Breisach on the border with France to the Sigmarszell junction on the Bundesautobahn 96 (A 96) near Lindau. Between the transition of the Bundesautobahn 98 (A 98) to the B 31 near the Stockach-Ost exit and Sigmarszell junction on the A 96 it is part of the E 54 from Paris to Munich.

== Route ==
Important places on the B 31 and junctions with other long distance roads:

- Breisach am Rhein (federal border D 415 - to 2006 N415)
- Freiburg im Breisgau (A 5, B 3)
- Kirchzarten
- Buchenbach
- Hinterzarten (B 500)
- Titisee-Neustadt (B 317)
- Löffingen (two petrol stations on the B 31, Schwarzwaldpark, Wutachschlucht)
- Hüfingen (B 27)
- Donaueschingen (B 33)
- Geisingen (A 81, B 311)
- Engen (B 491)
- Stockach (A 98, B 14)
- Überlingen
- Uhldingen-Mühlhofen
- Meersburg (B 33)
- Friedrichshafen (B 30)
- Kressbronn am Bodensee (B 467)
- Weißensberg (B 12)
- Sigmarszell (A 96, B 308)
- Lindau (Bodensee)

== See also ==
- List of federal highways in Germany

== Literature ==
- Daniel Schneider: Die Entwicklungsgeschichte der B 31 zwischen Freiburg im Breisgau und Breisach am Rhein, in: Walter Laub/Bernhard Kenk/Daniel Schneider: Die B 31-West ...in und um Umkirch herum. Umkirch, 2007, pp. 7-20.
