= Langenargen Festival =

German theater festival

The Langenargen Festival is a private theater located in the Bodensee district, headquartered in Langenargen on Lake Constance. The theater primarily presents in-house productions in the adult and family theater genres. The summer theater festival takes place from June to August outdoors in the castle park and, in case of bad weather, inside the cultural venue Münzhof. In addition, they offer theater education programs and a schedule outside of the summer theater season.

Since 2021, the Langenargen Festival has been a member of the German Federal Association of Stage Associations (DBV). Since its founding in May 2017, the non-profit organization Langenargen Festival e.V. has been the sponsor.

The idea for the Langenargen Festival was born in 2014. Over several years, theater creators Steffen Essigbeck and Nadine Klante developed the concept for the theater festival.

== Schedule ==
The Langenargen Festival started in the summer of 2018 with the family theater genre for the first festival season. The Robber Hotzenplotz (directed by Nadine Klante) was performed. In the second season, summer 2019, Master Detective Kalle Blomquist (directed by Nadine Klante) and a re-run of The Robber Hotzenplotz were shown.

In the summer of 2020, The Vodka Talks were performed, a staged reading by Arne Nielsen, played by Karoline Eichhorn and Catrin Striebeck. The planned main program of the third festival season (family play: Tom Sawyer and Huckleberry Finn; evening play: Romeo and Juliet) had to be postponed to 2021 due to the COVID-19 pandemic.

In the fourth festival season, summer 2021, the theater festival in Langenargen presented Romeo and Juliet (directed by Andreas Kloos) as an evening play for adults for the first time. Tom Sawyer and Huckleberry Finn (directed by Nadine Klante) was presented as a family play. The format "Sagenhaft – played readings" with the fairy tales The Little Mermaid and The Fisherman and His Wife was included in the summer schedule as a supporting program. With the theater production Loriot Dramatic Works (directed by Tamara Hattler), the Langenargen Festival offered an additional theater program outside of the summer season in the fall and winter for the first time in 2021. Two charity events were also held due to the deficit caused by the COVID-19 pandemic, including the cabaret The Boy Lives, the Horse is Dead with parodies about Johann Wolfgang von Goethe, and the piano evening Music is the Climate of My Soul in honor of Ludwig van Beethoven. In 2021, all performances took place with pandemic-related restrictions, including a reduction in capacity.

The fifth festival season took place from June 25 to August 8, 2022. The in-house production Dracula according to Bram Stoker (staging and theater version: Nadine Klante) was presented as an evening play for adults. The previous year's production Tom Sawyer and Huckleberry Finn (directed by Nadine Klante) was revived as a family play. The format "Sagenhaft – played readings" with the fairy tales The Bremen Town Musicians and Rübezahl was offered as a supporting program of the fifth season.
