= Paroemion =

Form of alliteration

Paroemion is a form of alliteration where nearly every word in a sentence begins with the same consonant.

The repetition of initial consonant sounds in neighboring words (as wild and woolly, threatening throngs) is also called head rhyme or initial rhyme.

An example of paroemion is:

The delicious doughnut drew delicate designs, drizzling delectable damson drops down Dave's duck-down vest. "Darn!" Dave declared dragging his dripping dukes across the dreadfully delightful disaster.

The term paroemion derives from the Greek term paromoiosis, which is used in Aristotle's Rhetoric to describe the effect wherein a pair of syntactically parallel clauses have the same sound, word, or syllable at their beginnings or ends. In the third to sixth centuries, Latin rhetoricians and grammarians used the term "parhomoeon" to describe the grouping of words sharing the same first letter. Matthew of Vendôme describes paroemion in Ennius's Annals and, contrary to the modern usage of the term, states that the figure may not exceed three consecutive words. Furthermore, Geoffrey of Vinsauf states that any such repetition must be done so modestly, and not excessively. Joannes Susenbrotus described paroemion as a disorder in syntax.
