= Obere Argen =

River in Germany

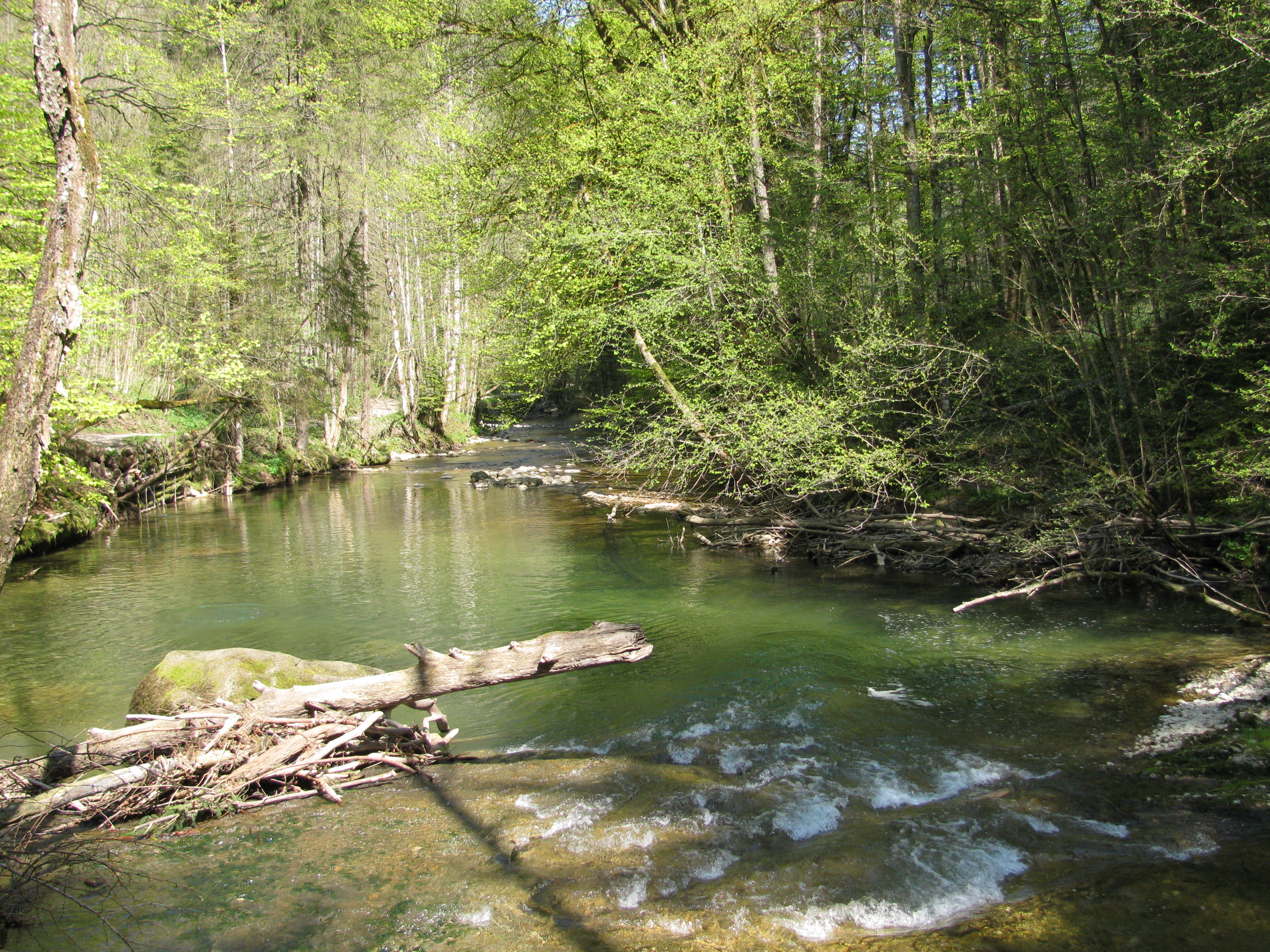
- The Obere Argen in the Eistobel gorge

Location
- Country: Germany
- State: Bavaria; Baden-Württemberg
- Districts: Oberallgäu; Lindau; Ravensburg

Physical characteristics
- Source
  - location: Origin: Confluence of the Seelesgraben, Moosmühlbach and Schwarzenbach near Oberstaufen
  - elevation: 791 m above sea level (NN)
- Mouth
  - location: Near Neuravensburg confluence with the Untere Argen
  - coordinates: 47°39′17″N 9°44′40″E
  - elevation: 489 m above sea level (NN)
- Length: 50.0 km (31.1 mi)
- Basin size: 220 km^{2} (85 sq mi)

Basin features
- Progression: Argen→ Lake Constance→ Rhine→ North Sea
- Landmarks: Large towns: Wangen im Allgäu; Small towns: Gestratz
- Tributaries
  - left: Röthenbach
  - right: Jugetach

The Obere Argen ("Upper Argen") is a river in southwestern Bavaria and southeastern Baden-Württemberg in Germany.

Northwest of Oberstaufen in the Bavarian-Swabian county of Oberallgäu, the Seelesgraben, the Moosmühlbach and the Schwarzenbach streams converge forming the Obere Argen. From this confluence the river flows through the Eistobel, a gorge which is passable on foot within the eponymous nature reserve and past the Grünenbach heading for Wangen im Allgäu. Near Gestratz the Obere Argen collects the waters of the Röthenbach coming from the left and forms the Bavarian-Württemberg state border as far as Wangen.

North of the Wangen district of Neuravensburg the Obere Argen unites with the Untere Argen ("Lower Argen") to form the Argen, which then discharges into Lake Constance between Kressbronn and Langenargen after about 23 kilometres.

== Bridges ==
=== Argentobel Bridge ===
The Argentobel Bridge is a 230 metres (750 ft) long bridge structure on the Bavarian state road, the S 1318 between the villages of Grünenbach and Maierhöfen in the county of Lindau (Bodensee). It crosses the Obere Argen in 12 arches at a maximum height of 56 metres (184 ft).

=== Argen Bridge, Föhlschmitten ===
In the Wangen village of Neuravensburg above the road bridge (K 8002), a covered wooden bridge built in 1790 by Abbot Beda Angehrn runs over the Upper Argen.

=== Obere Argen Viaduct ===
The Obere Argen Viaduct is a 730 metres (2,400 ft) long structure supporting the A 96 motorway. The autobahn viaduct comprises a cable-stayed bridge in combination with cable-tensioning beneath the roadway - a form of construction that was a first in Germany.

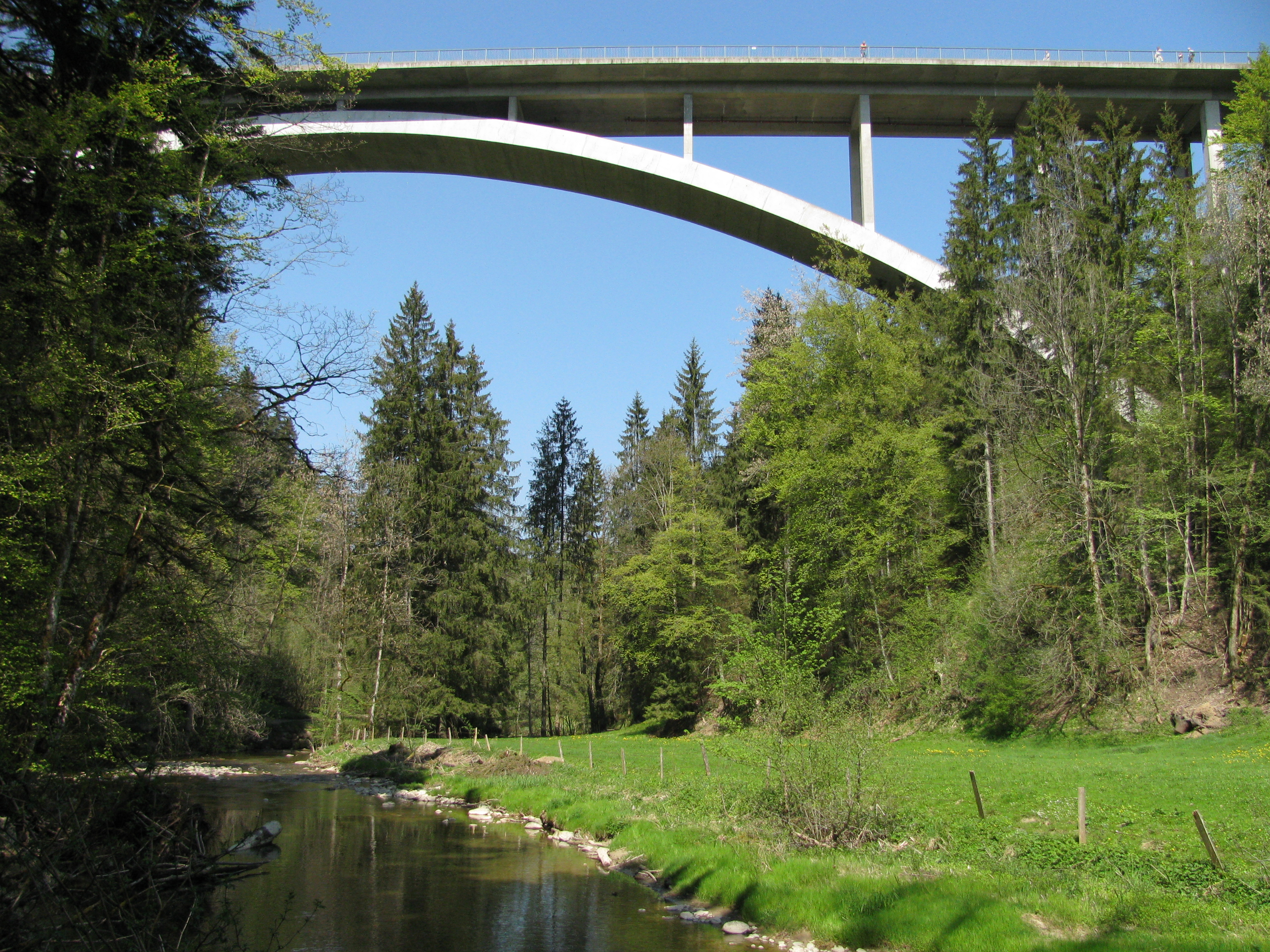
Argentobel Bridge

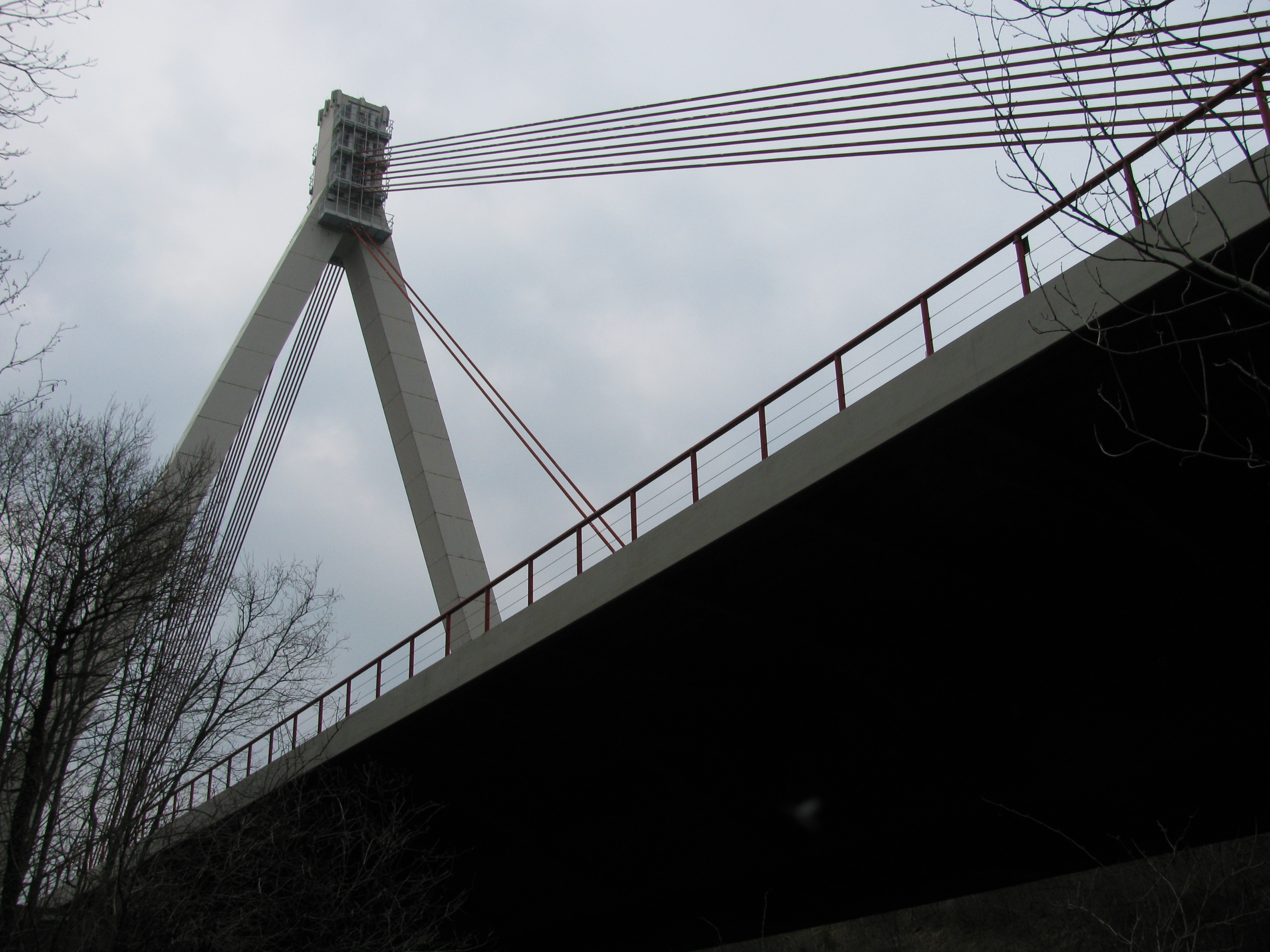
Obere Argen Viaduct

== See also ==
- List of rivers of Bavaria
- List of rivers of Baden-Württemberg

== Literature ==
- Hermann Vogelmann (1988), Die Argen. Von den Quellen bis zur Mündung (in German), Bergatreute: Eppe, ISBN 3-89089-009-1
- Norbert Kruse (2002), "Die Argen und ihre Namen", Im Oberland (in German), vol. Heft 2, pp. 55–64
