= Matthias Ostermann =

Canadian potter, artist and author

Matthias Ostermann (1951-2009) was a Canadian potter, artist and author.

== Biography ==
Matthias Ostermann was born in Wangen Im Allgäu, West Germany in 1951 and immigrated to Canada with his mother, Lila Ostermann, in 1953. Ostermann spent his formative years in Toronto, Ontario. In his late teens, noted German-Canadian potter Isolde Rest introduced him to the ceramic arts.

He formally launched his career as a potter in 1974 and travelled extensively in search of learning and inspiration – living and working in Ireland, West Germany, Italy and Australia.

In the early 1990s, inspired by its creative energy and vibrant arts community, Ostermann relocated to Montreal, Québec, where he lived and worked until his death. Ostermann died at the Royal Victoria Hospital in Montreal on April 19, 2009, following a battle with HIV-induced lymphoma.

== Artistic career ==
As a young man, Ostermann’s desire to perfect his skills as a ceramicist led him to spend a year as a thrower in a domestic earthenware pottery at Shanagarry in County Cork, Ireland, where he made hundreds of pots a week. This apprenticeship enabled him to refine his technical skills, as well as his understanding of high-fired stoneware production pottery.

From 1981 onward, Ostermann specialised in low-fired tin-glaze techniques for functional domestic wares, sculpture and architectural wall tiles. Despite an initial focus on earthenware production, he later began to explore Asian high-fire glazes.

Ostermann’s skills in drawing and painting led him to experiment with surface decoration, and he eventually became known for his maiolica and copper sgraffito. This leaning towards painting and narrative work could be attributed to a love of stories, myths and legends, a legacy from his mother who was a professional storyteller in Germany.

He also gained acclaim for his teaching skills, as well as his knowledge of the history and techniques associated with the ceramic arts. Over the decades, Ostermann exhibited, lectured, and taught in Canada, Australia, Germany, Ireland, the Netherlands, France, Scandinavia, New Zealand, the United States and Brazil, as well as the UK.

Ostermann authored three books on ceramics, The New Maiolica: Contemporary Approaches to Colour and Technique (1999), The Ceramic Surface (2002) and The Ceramic Narrative (2006), published by A&C Black in London and the University of Pennsylvania Press in Philadelphia, and contributed to a number of others.

His final body of work, a series of multimedia pieces under the broad name of Boats of Passage, dealt with his diagnosis of HIV-related lymphoma in 2008. In his artist’s statement on the works, he stated:

“Boats of Passage is not necessarily about confronting the fear of dying but rather deals with the examination of important inner changes necessitated by the coming to terms with my own mortality, my relationships and the sometimes loss of autonomy in the face of helplessness.

My use of the boat image as a metaphor is by no means novel; it has been used by past and present artists throughout history to symbolize the concept of a vessel carrying us along the river of life (to continue the metaphor) and even beyond into the afterlife [...].

In this body of work I have drawn as always from my love of human figure dramas and mythological references to create both human and anthropomorphic figures that interact, are movable and seem to contemplate and question as passengers on a boat. Other figures enact their little dramas as drawings on vessels and on paper.”

Ostermann's final exhibition, Boats of Passage, was held in 2008 at Prime Gallery in Toronto, Ontario.

== Artistic legacy ==
In addition to the reference works he authored, Ostermann’s work can be found in permanent collections such as those of the Musée national des beaux-arts du Québec, the Musée des métiers d’art du Québec, the Landesmuseum Württemberg in Germany, the Canadian Clay and Glass Gallery, the Victoria and Albert Museum in London, and the Royal Ontario Museum and Gardiner Museum of Ceramic Art in Toronto.

In 2010, he was posthumously made an Honorary Member of the American National Council for the Education of Ceramic Arts. In addition, Ostermann and his Boats of Passage were dramatized in a 2016 play by Montreal playwright and author Marcel Pomerlo, titled Matthias Ostermann ou Le dernier petit bateau.

In 2023, the Canadian Clay and Glass Gallery opened an exhibit, The Decorated Surface, intended in large part as an homage to Ostermann and his work.
