= Patricia Watson-Miller =

British motorbike rally raid rider (born 1965)

Patricia Watson-Miller (née Schek; born 20 July 1965 in Wangen im Allgäu, West Germany) is a British motorbike rally raid rider, who was born and raised in Germany. She was able to win the ladies cup of the Dakar rally three times.

Patricia Watson-Miller is the daughter of the successful German motorbike enduro rider Herbert Schek, who became German, European and World champion and competed in the Dakar rally 15 times. Patricia studied business informatics at the university of Konstanz and acquired a master in Informatics. Today she lives in London and works as business manager in a financial services company.

She started in the Dakar rally for the first time in 1988 but had to quit. In 1990 and 1991 she won the ladies cup on a Schek-BMW built by her father. In 1992 she came in second on a Suzuki DR 350 – behind the former private rider Jutta Kleinschmidt on a BMW R 100 GS. After a pause in which she gave birth to two boys she won the title of Ladies World Champion in the cross country rally world championship in 2005. In 2006 she started again in the Dakar rally - this time on a KTM EXC 525. She crashed heavily, yet she was able to continue and finished 67th overall and won the ladies cup for the third time. In 2008 she started in the Trans-oriental Rally which led from St. Petersburg to Beijing and finished 19th overall. Die Trans-oriental rally in 2008 was the substitute for the Dakar rally, which was cancelled that year due to terrorism warnings.
