= Wangen im Allgäu =

- Town
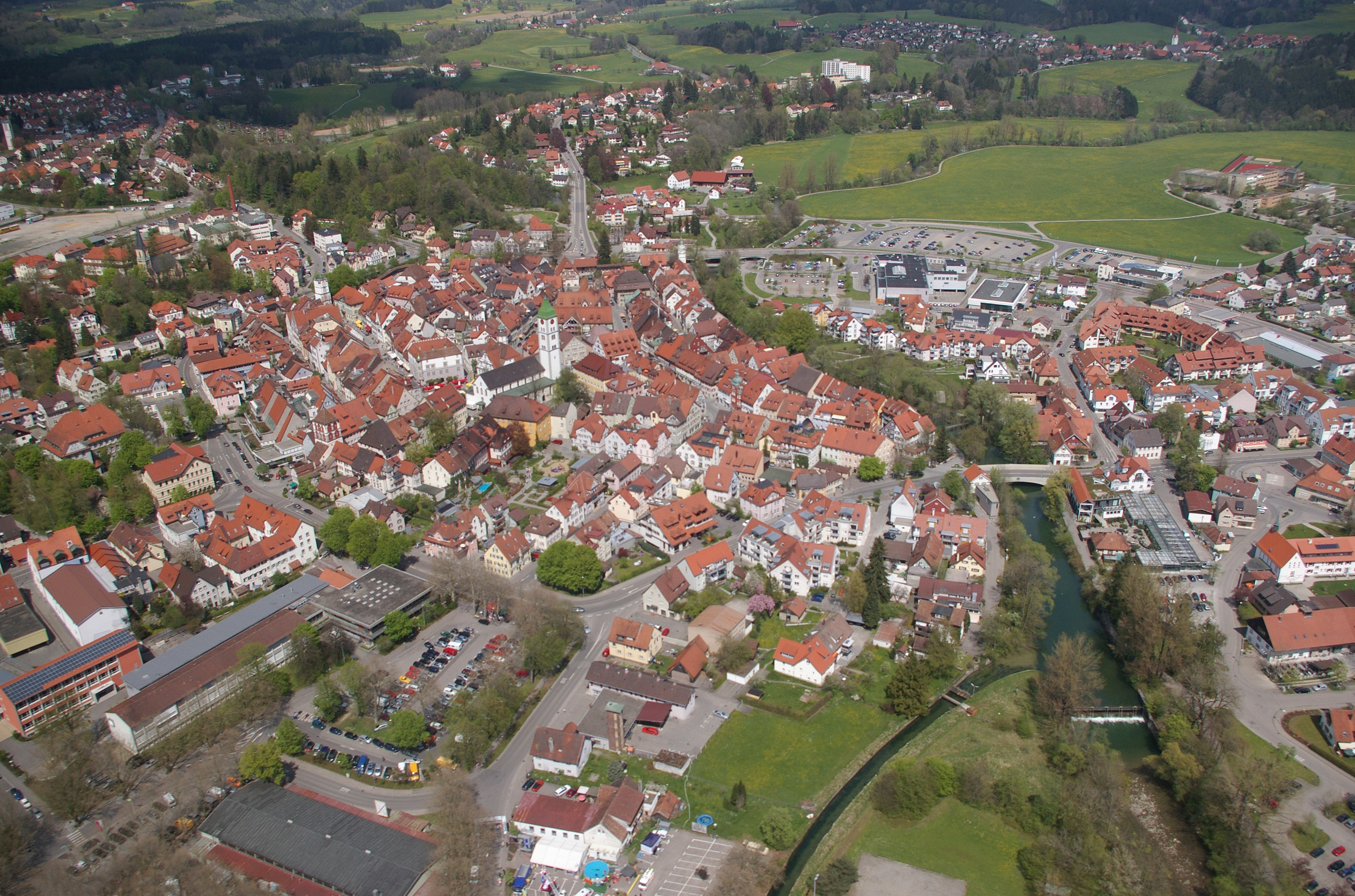
- Center of Wangen

- Coat of arms

- Location of Wangen im Allgäu within Ravensburg district
- Interactive map of Wangen im Allgäu
- Location within Germany Location within Baden-Württemberg
- Coordinates: 47°41′9″N 9°50′3″E
- Country: Germany
- State: Baden-Württemberg
- District: Ravensburg

Government
  - Mayor (2017–25): Michael Lang (Ind.)

Area
  - Total: 101.35 km^{2} (39.13 sq mi)
- Elevation: 556 m (1,824 ft)

Population (2025-12-31)
  - Total: 28,784
  - Density: 284.01/km^{2} (735.57/sq mi)
- Time zone: UTC+01:00 (CET)
  - Summer (DST): UTC+02:00 (CEST)
- Postal codes: 88239
- Dialling codes: 07522
- Vehicle registration: WG
- Website: www.wangen.de

Wangen im Allgäu (German pronunciation: [ˈvaŋən ʔɪm ˈʔalɡɔʏ], lit. 'Wangen in the Allgäu'; Low Alemannic: Wãnge) is a historic city in southeast Baden-Württemberg, Germany. It lies north-east of Lake Constance in the Westallgäu. It is the second-largest city (population: 26,927 in 2020) in the Ravensburg district and is a nexus for the surrounding communities. From 1938 to 1972, Wangen was the county seat of the Wangen rural district.

== Geography ==
Wangen in Allgäu lies on the north bank of the Obere Argen. The Untere Argen flows past northwest Wangen and unites southwest of the city with the Obere Argen. The city today is shaped by its historical town center as well as by numerous nearby districts.

=== Neighboring municipalities ===
Several settlements border Wangen. Their names are as follows: Amtzell, Vogt, Kißlegg, Argenbühl, and Achberg (Ravensburg district), Hergatz and Hergensweiler (Lindau district), and Neukirch (Bodensee district).

== History ==
The city was first mentioned in 815 under the name "Wangun" in a monastery document.

In 1217, Emperor Fredrick II declared in a document that Wangen should remain in royal hands. In 1286, King Rudolph I granted Wangen the status of free imperial city.

During the late Middle Ages, the city's growth was amplified by its central location at the crossroads between Ravensburg, Lindau, Leutkirch, and Isny and the growing trade through the Alps.

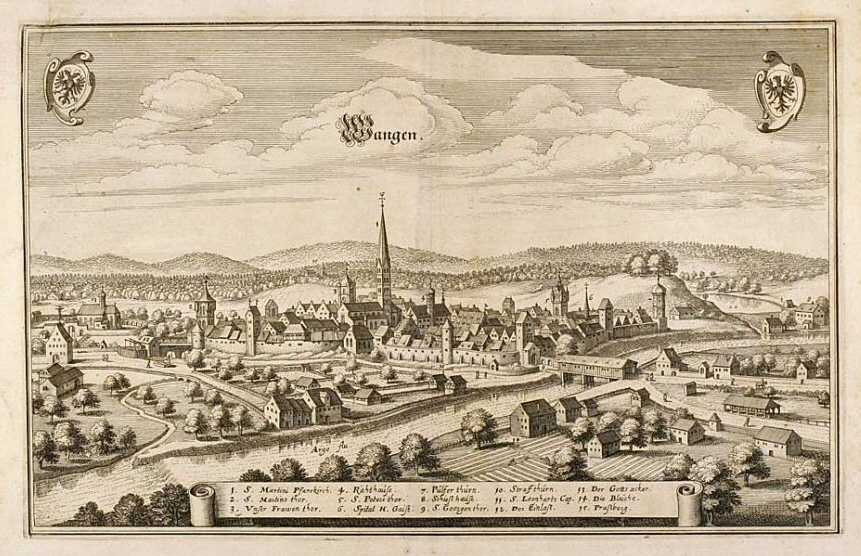
A picture of Wangen during the 17th century

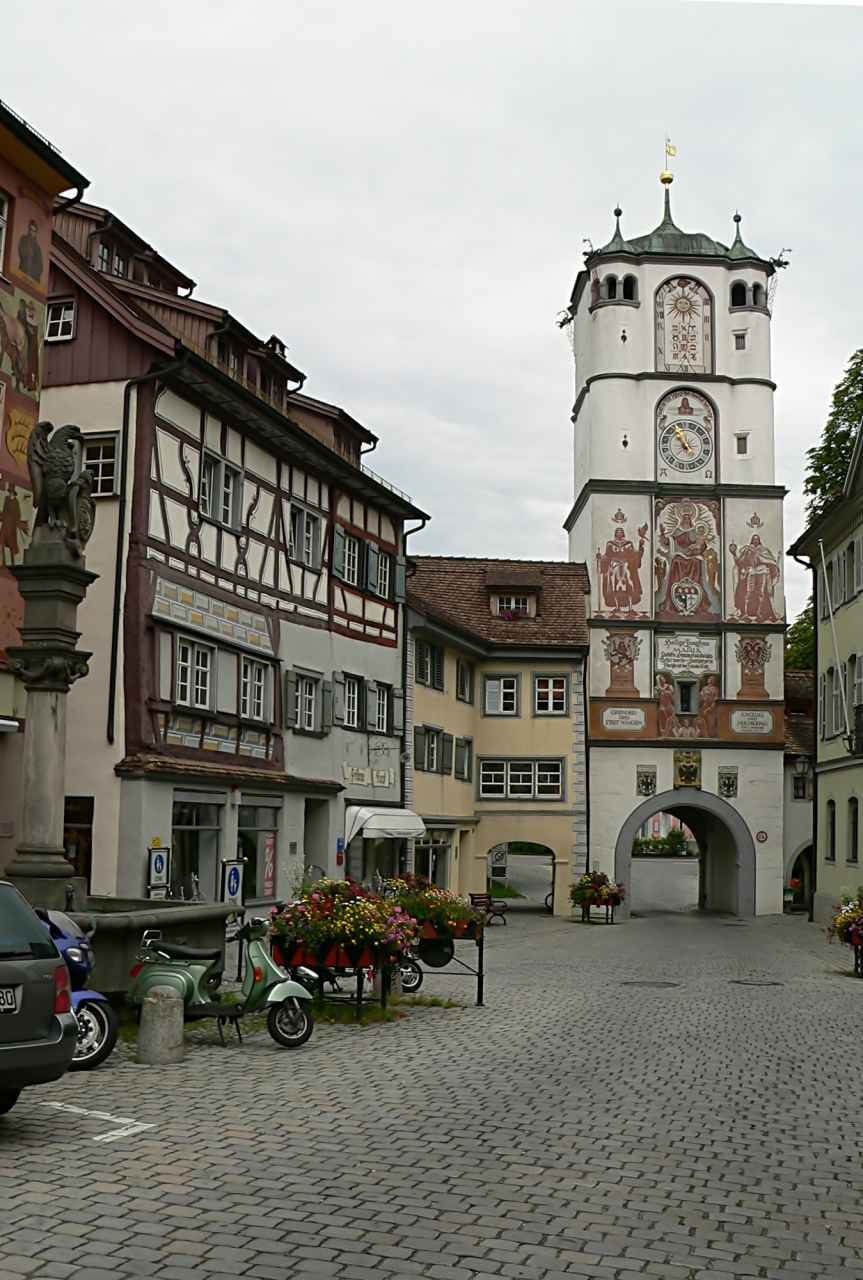
The Ravensburg Gate

Wangen's production and export of manufactured goods, particularly scythes and canvas, gave the city a tremendous positive trade balance. This surplus money was used to acquire lands outside of the city walls, thus giving Wangen a safeguard against economic fluctuations.

During the German Mediatisation, in 1802, Wangen lost its status as a Free City and was incorporated into the Kingdom of Bavaria; it later changed hands in 1810 to the Kingdom of Württemberg.

In 1936, the city was officially named "Wangen in Allgäu".

From 1938 up unto its dissolution and integration into the Ravensburg district in 1972, Wangen was the capital of the Wangen rural district. In 1973, Wangen was officially designated by the Baden-Württemberg state government to Großen Kreisstadt (large district town) due to its population having reached 20,000.

In 1999, the largest flood in the most recent 50 years of Wangen's history completely flooded the lower city. The city was again flooded in 2006 by the Obere Argen.

During the 2006 FIFA World Cup, the national team of Togo stayed in Wangen.

== Main sights ==
Despite major fires in 1539, 1793, and 1858, the old part of the town remains a juxtaposition of architectural elements ranging from those of the Early Middle Ages to those of the late Baroque era.

The Oberstadtkirche St. Martin ("St Martin's Upper City Church") is one of Wangen's oldest buildings. The church was already present in the 9th century; it was renovated numerous times in the following years. It contains both Romanesque and Gothic architecture.

The Ravensburg Gate is the city's prime landmark. It was first mentioned in 1472, but was probably changed to its current appearance in 1608. The building is decorated with Renaissance-era artwork. Similarly aged relics of the old city include the Lindau Gate and the Pfaffenturm tower.

The local history museum, Heimatmuseum in der Eselmühle, was opened in 1974 in a former mill acquired by the city in 1969. The museum displays the original mechanisms of the mill in addition to a collections from various spans of the city's history.

=== Population growth ===
Year	Inhabitants
1300	c. 700
1450	c. 1,400
1522	c. 1,500
1794	1,450
1823	1,308
1855	1,926
December 1, 1871 ¹	2,357
December 1, 1880 ¹	2,873
December 1, 1900 ¹	3,848
December 1, 1910 ¹	4,831
June 16, 1925 ¹	5,837
June 16, 1933 ¹	7,005

Year	Inhabitants
May 17, 1939 ¹	8,045
September 13, 1950 ¹	10,526
June 6, 1961 ¹	13,317
May 27, 1970 ¹	14,561
December 31, 1975	23,127
December 31, 1980	23,259
May 27, 1987 ¹	23,588
December 31, 1990	24,589
December 31, 1995	25,721
December 31, 2000	26,254
September 30, 2005	27,157

¹ Census

== Politics ==
=== Local council ===
The elections in May 2014 showed the following results:

- SPD = 5 seats
- CDU = 15 seats
- FW (Free voters) = 8 seats
- GOL (Green open list) = 8 seats
- Total: 36 seats

=== Mayors since 1804 ===
- 1804–1810: Franz Josef von Bentele
- 1811–1819: Mathias Tschugg
- 1819–1826: Rudolf Salis
- 1826–1829: Martin Schnitzer
- 1829–1847: Christian Nepomuk Weber
- 1847–1859: Leopold Wocher
- 1860–1894: Jacob Trenkle
- 1894–1922: Rudolf Trenkle
- 1922–1933: Fritz Geray
- 1933: Gottlob Pfeiffer (provisional)
- 1933–1939: Dr Friedrich Wilhelm Erbacher
- 1939: Heinrich Fischer (provisional)
- 1939–1942: Carl Speidel (on behalf of Heinrich Fischer)
- 1942–1945: Max Steinegger (provisional)
- 1945: Karl Geiger (provisional)
- 1945: Franz Büchele (provisional)
- 1945–1946: Josef Max Kraus (provisional)
- 1945–1968: Wilhelm Uhl
- 1968–2001: Dr Jörg Leist (born 1935)
- since 2001: Michael Lang (born 1965)

== Twin towns – sister cities ==
Wangen im Allgäu is twinned with:

- La Garenne-Colombes, France
- Prato, Italy
- Wil, Switzerland

== Economics and infrastructure ==
Wangen was once a center of the German textile industry before the decline of German textile manufacturing.

=== Inter-city transport ===
Wangen lies on the A96 Autobahn between Lindau and Memmingen, in addition to federal highways 18 and 32. The town is part of the Aulendorf – Kißlegg – Wangen - Hergatz – Lindau and Ulm – Memmingen – Kißlegg – Wangen – Hergatz – Lindau train lines. It lies on the bus route between Ravensburg and Isny. The city also belongs to the Bodensee–Oberschwaben public transportation association.

=== Education ===
Wangen has a Gymnasium (Rupert-Neß-Gymnasium), a Realschule (Johann-Andreas-Rauch-Realschule), a Hauptschule (Hauptschule Karsee), a Werkrealschule (Anton-von-Gegenbaur-Schule) and a special school (Martinstorschule), three combined secondary and elementary schools (GHS Niederwangen, Praßberg-Schule and Freie Waldorfschule Wangen), and six elementary schools (Berger-Höhe-Schule, Deuchelried, Grundschule im Ebnet, Leupolz, Neuravensburg, and Schomburg).

The Wangen district has two vocational schools (Friedrich-Schiedel-Schule and Kaufmännischen Schule Wangen), in addition to the Heinrich-Brügger-Schule medical school.

=== Media ===
Wangen is serviced by the Schwäbische Zeitung newspaper as well as the local Regio TV television station.

=== Governmental ===
Wangen is the seat of a local tax office. It has a district court, which belongs to the Ravensburg regional court district, which in turn belongs to the Stuttgart court district.

== Other ==
- From 1943 to 1945, Wangen served as the backdrop for the propaganda movie Quax in Fahrt
- From April 14 to May 13, 2004, the city and its surrounding areas served as a setting for the Tatort television series.
- The Wangen Juze Tonne e. V is the oldest autonomously run youth center in Germany.
- The Jugendmusikschule in Wangen is the largest school of music in Baden-Württemberg.

== Notable people ==
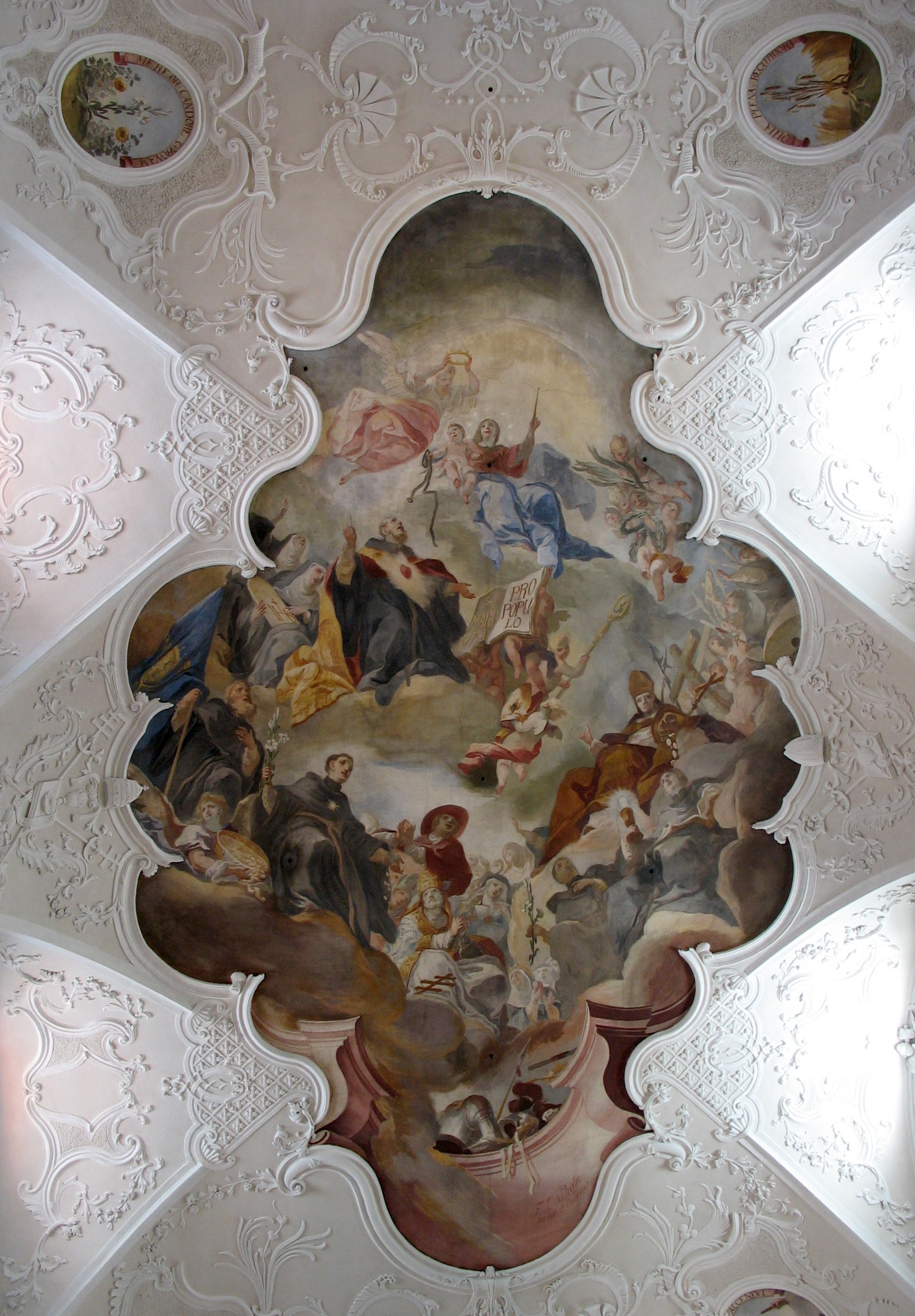
Fresco in Constance by Franz Joseph Spiegler, from 1740

- Joannes Susenbrotus (1484/1485 – 1542/1543), a German humanist, teacher of Latin and author of textbooks.
- Franz Joseph Spiegler (1691–1757), a German Baroque painter of frescoes
- Roland Bader (born 1938), conductor, the principal guest conductor of the Kraków Philharmonic Orchestra
- Frank Natterer (born 1941), mathematician, deals with computed tomography
- Matthias Ostermann (1951-2009), a Canadian potter, artist and author; emigrated 1953
- Raimund Haser (born 1975), politician

=== Sport ===
- Ernst Jakob Henne (1904–2005), motor cycle racer and world land speed record holder
- Patricia Watson-Miller (born 1965), motorcycle rally raid driver, won the ladies cup of the Dakar rally three times.
- Sigrid Wille (born 1969), cross-country skier
- Ivana Rudelic (born 1992), footballer, played over 200 games and 34 for Croatia women
- Janik Haberer (born 1994), footballer, has played over 300 games
- Melanie Leupolz (born 1994), soccer player, has played over 200 games and 79 for Germany women

== See also ==
- Swabia
- Allgäu
