= Bollenbach (Argen) =

River in Germany

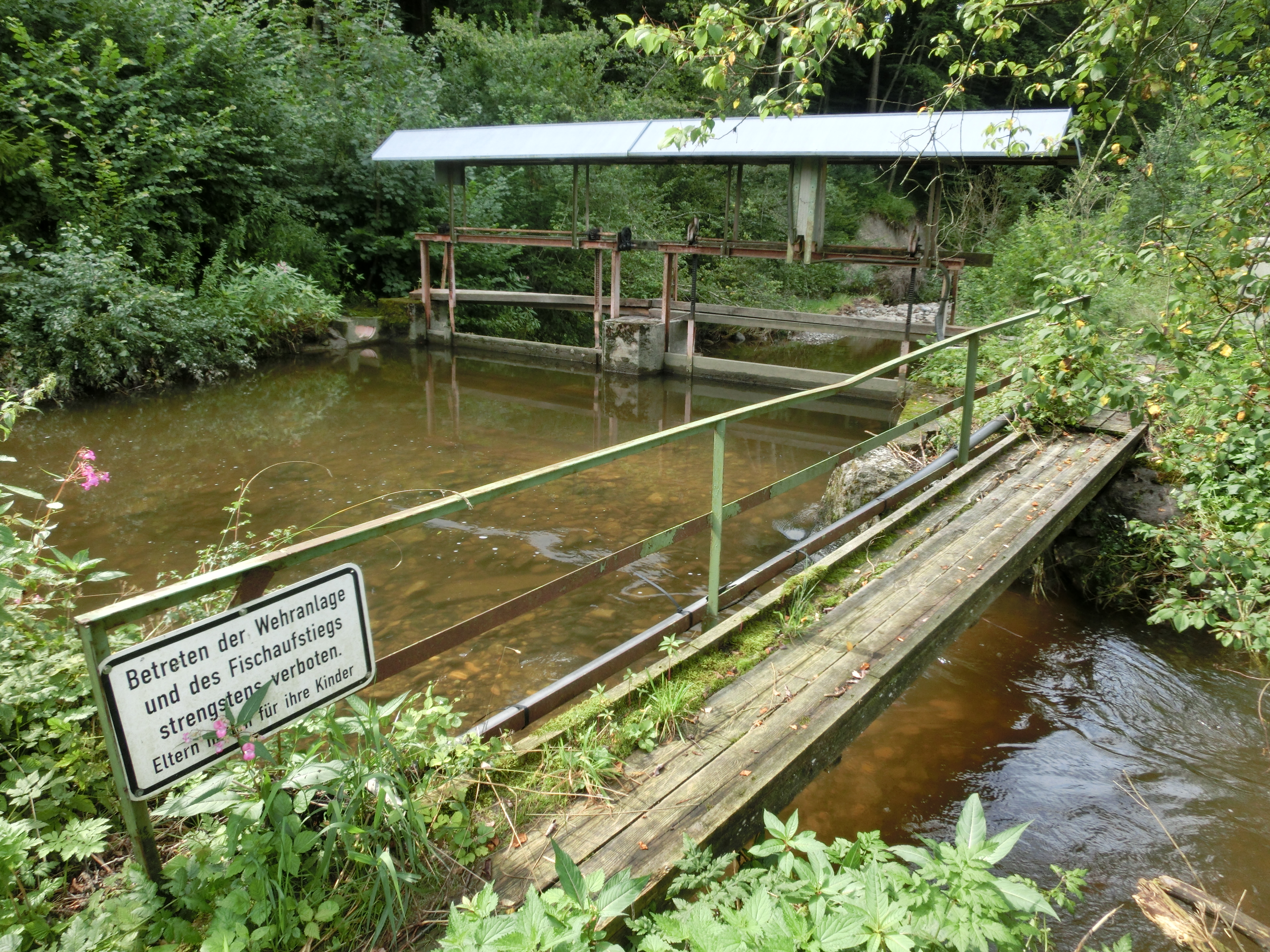
- Weir northeast of Laimnau

Location
- Location: Germany
- Reference no.: DE: 215292

Physical characteristics
- Source
  - location: Near Obereisenbach
  - coordinates: 47°41′23″N 9°38′39″E
  - elevation: around 510 m above sea level (NN)
- Mouth
  - location: Near Laimnau into the Argen
  - coordinates: 47°38′04″N 9°37′44″E
  - elevation: around 431 m above sea level (NN)
- Length: 7.8 km

Basin features
- Progression: Argen→ Lake Constance→ Rhine→ North Sea

The Bollenbach is a roughly 7.8-kilometre-long stream in the German state of Baden-Württemberg within the county of Bodenseekreis. It is a right-hand tributary of the Argen.

== Course ==
The Bollenbach rises north of the Tettnang village of Obereisenbach from several springs that lie within the forest of Arlenholz. Thereafter it flows, canalized, in a southerly direction through countryside used for agriculture. After Tannau, a village on the Upper Swabian Baroque Route and part of Tettnang, it passes through the Bollen woods. Here its course is more original. It continues southwards, running past Wiesertsweiler and through the village of Laimnau, also part of Tettnang, where it finally empties into the Argen.

=== Tributaries ===
From its source to its mouth the Bollenbach picks up the waters of many unnamed streams as well as the following tributaries:

- Flockenbach (l), south of Tannau
- Kreuzweiherbach (l), near Wiesertsweiler

== See also ==
- List of rivers of Baden-Württemberg
