= Sigmarszell (Verwaltungsgemeinschaft) =

- Verwaltungsgemeinschaft
- Location of Sigmarszell within Lindau district
- Interactive map of Sigmarszell
- Location within Germany Location within Bavaria
- Coordinates: 47°36′N 9°46′E
- Country: Germany
- State: Bavaria
- Admin. region: Swabia
- District: Lindau
- Seat: Sigmarszell
- Subdivisions: 3 municipalities

Area
  - Total: 35.93 km^{2} (13.87 sq mi)

Population (2025-12-31)
  - Total: 7,542
  - Density: 209.9/km^{2} (543.7/sq mi)
- Time zone: UTC+01:00 (CET)
  - Summer (DST): UTC+02:00 (CEST)
- Website: www.vgem-sigmarszell.de

Sigmarszell is a Verwaltungsgemeinschaft (municipal association) in the district of Lindau in Bavaria, Germany. Its seat is in Sigmarszell.

It consists of the following municipalities:

1. Hergensweiler
2. Sigmarszell
3. Weißensberg
