= Hergensweiler =

- Municipality
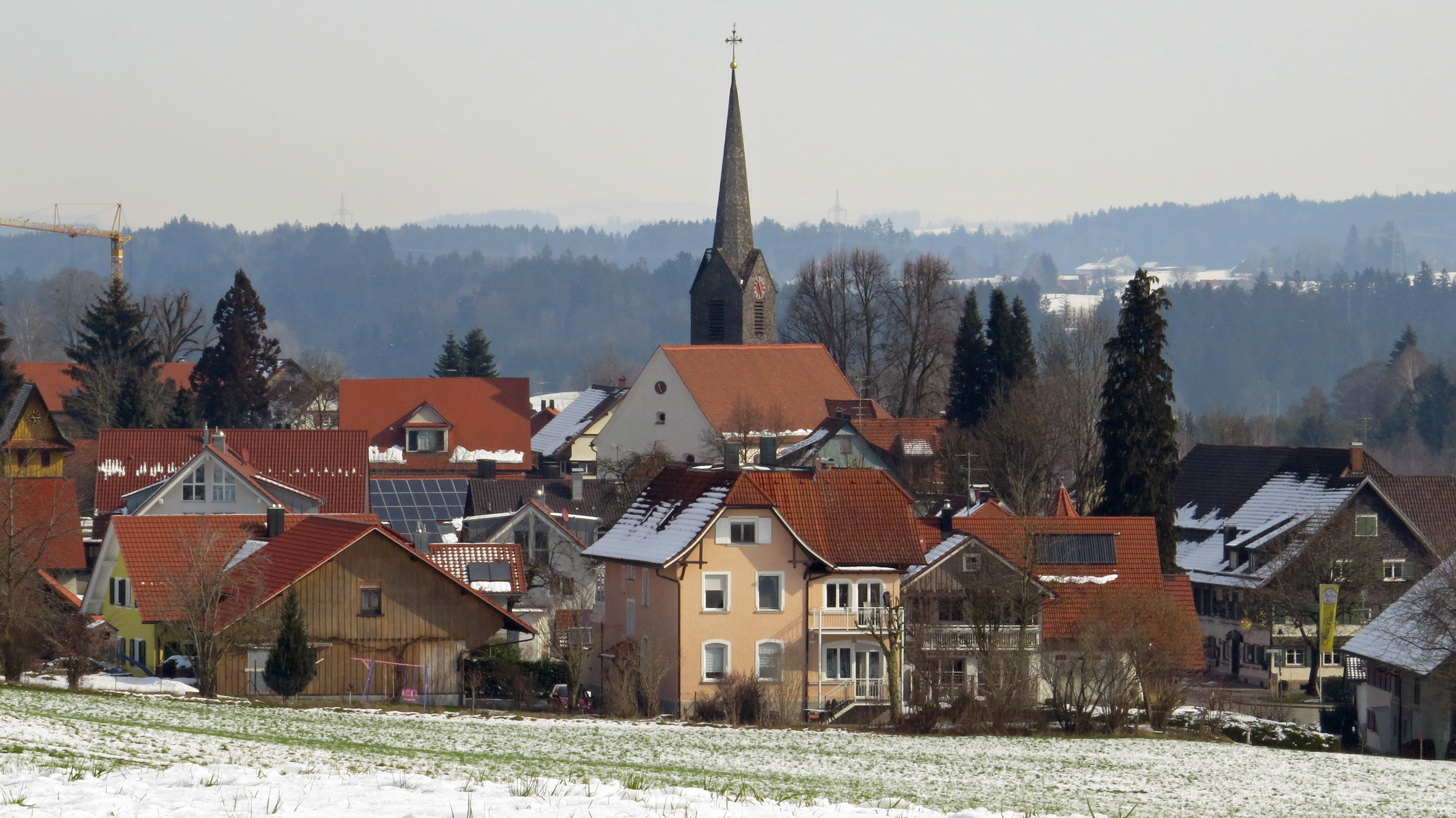
- Hergensweiler seen from the southwest

- Coat of arms

- Location of Hergensweiler within Lindau district
- Interactive map of Hergensweiler
- Location within Germany Location within Bavaria
- Coordinates: 47°37′N 9°46′E
- Country: Germany
- State: Bavaria
- Admin. region: Schwaben
- District: Lindau
- Municipal assoc.: Sigmarszell

Government
  - Mayor (2020–26): Wolfgang Strohmaier

Area
  - Total: 12.06 km^{2} (4.66 sq mi)
- Elevation: 520 m (1,710 ft)

Population (2025-12-31)
  - Total: 1,915
  - Density: 158.8/km^{2} (411.3/sq mi)
- Time zone: UTC+01:00 (CET)
  - Summer (DST): UTC+02:00 (CEST)
- Postal codes: 88138
- Dialling codes: 08388
- Vehicle registration: LI
- Website: www.hergensweiler.de

Hergensweiler is a municipality in the district of Lindau in Bavaria in Germany. It is member of the municipal association of Sigmarszell.

== Geography ==
Hergensweiler is located in the Allgäu region.

== History ==
Hergensweiler was most likely founded about 800 AD by the Alemanni. It presumably owes its name to the Alemannic Hergen. Hergensweiler was an Amt of the free imperial city of Lindau and was assigned to the sovereigns of Bretzenheim by the Reichsdeputationshauptschluss (Principal Conclusion of the Extraordinary Imperial Delegation) in 1803 as part of the new formed principality of Lindau. They exchanged it to Austria in 1804, which had to assign it to Bavaria in 1805.

=== Population development ===
In 1970 1,098, in 1987 1,391 and in 2000 1,660 inhabitants were living in the municipality of Heimenkirch.

== Politics ==
The mayor of Hergensweiler is Wolfgang Strohmaier, in office since 2014.

The revenue from the municipal tax added up to 902,000 € in 1999, of which the net business tax amounted to 342,000 €.

== Economy and infrastructure ==
=== Economy, agriculture and forestry ===
According to the official statistics, in 1998 there were 16 employees who were subject to social insurance contribution in the sector of agriculture and forestry, 310 in the industrial sector and 19 in the sector of trade and transport at place of work. In miscellaneous sectors there were 37 people employed at place of work. At pace of domicile there were 517 employees altogether. In the industrial sector there were none, in the main construction trade three businesses. Moreover, there were 40 agricultural businesses in 1999 with a total area of 640 ha.

=== Education ===
In 1999 the following institutions existed:

- Kindergartens: 50 kindergarten spaces with 49 children
- One elementary school with 5 teachers and 103 students
