= Joannes Susenbrotus =

Joannes Susenbrotus (also spelled Susembrotus, also known as Johannes or Hans Susenbrot, 1484/1485–1542/1543) was a German humanist, teacher of Latin, and author of textbooks.

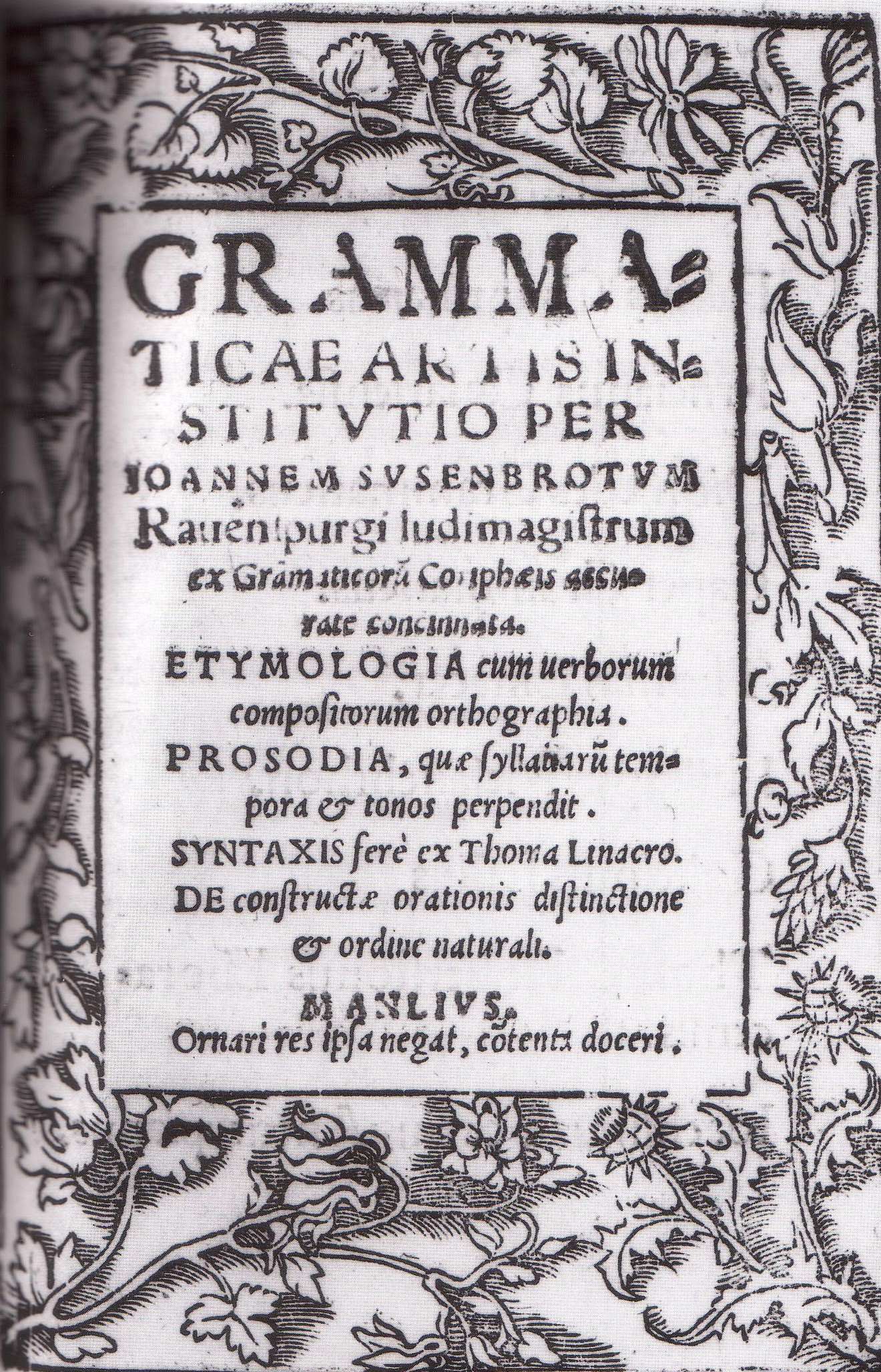
Grammaticae artis institutio, Leipzig 1539

Susenbrotus was born in the Imperial Free City of Wangen im Allgäu and studied at the universities of Vienna and Basel. From 1506, he was a teacher in Leutkirch, and subsequently in Pfullendorf, Schaffhausen, and – from 1522 – in Ravensburg.

He wrote several books in Latin, amongst them a Latin textbook Grammaticae artis institutio and a collection of Christian poems. His rhetorics textbook Epitome troporum defines 132 tropes and figures and gives examples of their use in ancient literature as well as references in contemporary books on rhetorics.

Living in the days of the Protestant Reformation, Susenbrotus distinctly remained a Roman Catholic. Around 1542, Susenbrotus died from injuries sustained when a drunk caskmaker beat him up in Ravensburg.

Susenbrotus' textbooks spread his name to pupils all over Europe. William Shakespeare seems to have known Epitome troporum, since – as T. W. Baldwin pointed out – he uses numerous examples from Susenbrotus' book in his works. He is also a well-known rhetorician to other Elizabethan writers and poets such as Gabriel Harvey, Thomas Nashe and Thomas Watson. On 12 March 1615, students of Trinity College, Cambridge, played the Latin comedy, Susenbrotus, or Fortunia, probably written by John Chappell, in the presence of King James I at Royston. As late as 1660 the English educationalist Charles Hoole recommends Susenbrotus' Epitome as a textbook for grammar schools.

== Works ==
- Grammaticae artis institutio, Schumann, Leipzig 1539, and various later editions
- Scholae christianae epigrammatum libri duo, ex variis Christianorum poetis excerpti, ac iam à multis mendis repurgati in usum Christianorum adulescentulorum, Brylinger, Basel 1541 (collected Christian poems)
- Epitome Troporvm Ac Schematvm Et Grammaticorum & Rhetorum: ad Authores tum prophanos tum sacros intelligendos non-minus utilis quàm necessaria, Froschauer, Tiguri (Zürich) 1541? and various later editions, first edition in England 1562
- Methodus octo partium orationis una cum formulis declinandi nomina ac coniugandi verba, pueris nuper musarum adyta ingressis cognitu cum primis necessaria, Froschauer, Tiguri (Zürich) 1565
