= Bundesautobahn 96 =

Federal motorway in Germany

A 96
- Bundesautobahn 96
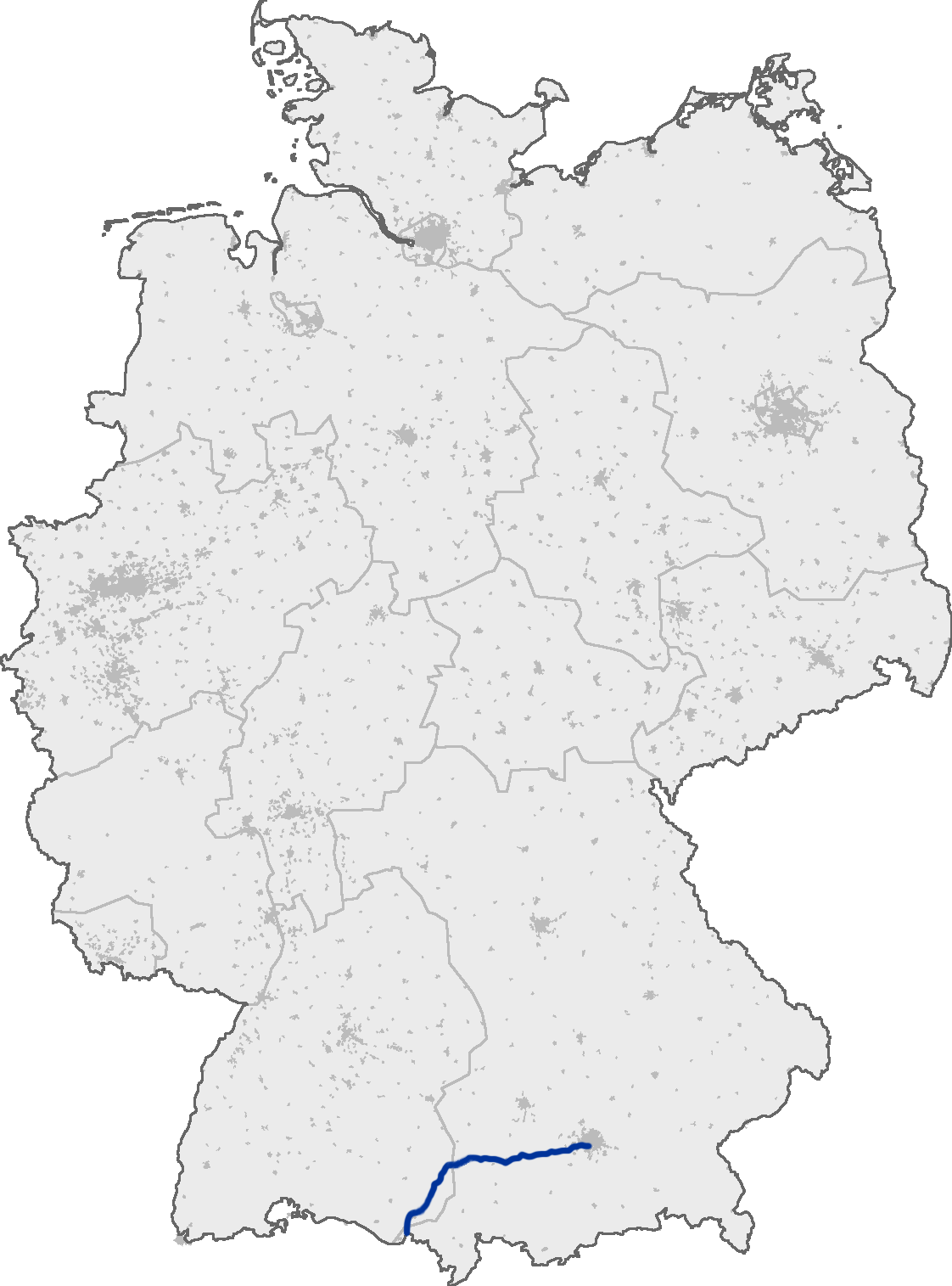

Route information
- Length: 147 km (91 mi)

Major junctions
- Southwest end: Austrian border (A14) near Lindau
- B 31
- Northeast end: Munich

Location
- Country: Germany
- States: Bavaria, Baden-Württemberg

Highway system
- Roads in Germany; Autobahns; List; Federal; List; State; E-roads
← A 95	→ A 98

Bundesautobahn 96 (translates from German as Federal Motorway 96, short form Autobahn 96, abbreviated as BAB 96 or A 96) is a motorway in southern Germany, leading from the Austrian border (A14) near Lindau (Lake Constance) through Memmingen, Landsberg am Lech to Munich. Two European routes lead through the autobahn: E 43 and E 54.

It was first planned to build a direct connection between Munich and Lindau before World War II, south of Ammersee. During the 1972 Summer Olympics in Munich, a section from Munich to Oberpfaffenhofen and Germering was built. A 25 km (16 mi) part of the road during those games were used for the road team time trial cycling event.

The last two-laned section, from Wangen-Nord to Leutkirch-Süd, was upgraded in 2009.

== Exit list ==
Legend:

- I/C - Interchange, I/S - Intersection, RSA - Rest and service area, OBR - Overhead bridge restaurant, R/R - Restaurant and rest plaza, L/B - Layby, V/P - Vista point, TN - tunnel, T/P - Toll plaza, BR - Bridge
- C - Cloverleaf, S - Stack, T-A - Trumpet-A, T-B - Trumpet-B, DT - Directional-T/Y, SDT - Semi-Directional-T/Y, P-Y - Partial-Y, D - Diamond, P-C - Partial cloverleaf, D-D - Diverging diamond, D-R - Direct ramp

Yes	District	Location	km	mi	Exit	Name	Destinations	Notes
Bavaria	96	96			Austria–Germany border Continue as A 14			
Bavaria	96	96			1	Lindau border crossing		
Bavaria	96	96			2	Lindau		
Bavaria	96	96			3	Sigmarszell	B 31 / E54; B 308	
Bavaria	96	96			4	Weißensberg	B 12	
Bavaria	96	96			-	Neuravensburg		
Baden-Württemberg	96	96			Talbrücke Obere Argen (730 m)			
Baden-Württemberg	96	96			Humbrechts/Ettensweiler Rest area			
Baden-Württemberg	96	96			Talbrücke Untere Argen (390 m)			
Baden-Württemberg	96	96			5	Wangen-West	B 32	
Baden-Württemberg	96	96			Herfatz Tunnel (440 m)			
Baden-Württemberg	96	96			Untere Argen Brücke			
Baden-Württemberg	96	96			6	Wangen-Nord	B 18	
Baden-Württemberg	96	96			Untere Argen Bridge			
Baden-Württemberg	96	96			7	Kißlegg		
Baden-Württemberg	96	96			Winterberg Rest area			
Baden-Württemberg	96	96			St. Gallus Road church			
Baden-Württemberg	96	96			8	Leutkirch-Süd	B 18	
Baden-Württemberg	96	96			9	Leutkirch-West	B 465	
Baden-Württemberg	96	96			10	Leutkirch-Nord Aichstetten	B 18	
Baden-Württemberg	96	96			11	Aitrach		
Baden-Württemberg	96	96			Illerbrücke (100 m)			
Baden-Württemberg	96	96			Buxachtalbrücke (320 m)			
Baden-Württemberg	96	96			12	Memmingen	A 7 / E43 / E532	4-way interchange
Baden-Württemberg	96	96			13	Memmingen-Nord	B 300	
Baden-Württemberg	96	96			Memminger-Ach-Brücke (380 m)			
Baden-Württemberg	96	96			14	Memmingen-Ost		
Baden-Württemberg	96	96			Parkplatz-WC Rest area			
Baden-Württemberg	96	96			16	Holzgünz		
Baden-Württemberg	96	96			17	Erkheim		
Baden-Württemberg	96	96			Kohlbergtunnel Tunnel (598 m/602 m)			
Baden-Württemberg	96	96			Rest area			
Baden-Württemberg	96	96			18	Stetten		
Baden-Württemberg	96	96			19	Mindelheim	B 16	
Baden-Württemberg	96	96			20	Bad Wörishofen/Türkheim		
Baden-Württemberg	96	96			Wertachbrücke (80 m)			
Baden-Württemberg	96	96			Rest area			
Baden-Württemberg	96	96			21	Buchloe-West		
Baden-Württemberg	96	96			22	Jengen/Kaufbeuren		
Baden-Württemberg	96	96			23	Buchloe-Ost		
Baden-Württemberg	96	96			24	Landsberg am Lech-West	B 17	
Baden-Württemberg	96	96			Lechwiesen Services			
Baden-Württemberg	96	96			25	Landsberg am Lech-Nord		
Baden-Württemberg	96	96			Lechtalbrücke (270 m)			
Baden-Württemberg	96	96			26	Landsberg am Lech-Ost		
Baden-Württemberg	96	96			27	Schöffelding		
Baden-Württemberg	96	96			28	Windach		
Baden-Württemberg	96	96			Talbrücke (270 m)			
Baden-Württemberg	96	96			29	Greifenberg		
Baden-Württemberg	96	96			Eching Tunnel (380 m)			
Baden-Württemberg	96	96			Amperbrücke (70 m)			
Baden-Württemberg	96	96			30	Inning am Ammersee	B 471	
Baden-Württemberg	96	96			Martinsberg Rest area			
Baden-Württemberg	96	96			Etterschlag Tunnel (500 m)			
Baden-Württemberg	96	96			31	Wörthsee		
Baden-Württemberg	96	96			32	Oberpfaffenhofen		
Baden-Württemberg	96	96			33	Gilching		
Baden-Württemberg	96	96			34	Germering-Süd		
Baden-Württemberg	96	96			35	Dreieck München-Süd-West	A 99	
Baden-Württemberg	96	96			36a	München-Freiham-Süd		Partial interchange (from/to Munich)
Baden-Württemberg	96	96			Lochham Tunnel (280 m)			
Baden-Württemberg	96	96			36b	Gräfelfing		
Baden-Württemberg	96	96			37	München-Blumenau		
Baden-Württemberg	96	96			38	München-Laim		
Baden-Württemberg	96	96			39	München-Sendling	B 2 R	
1.000 mi = 1.609 km; 1.000 km = 0.621 mi: Incomplete access; Route transition
