= Weißensberg =

- Municipality
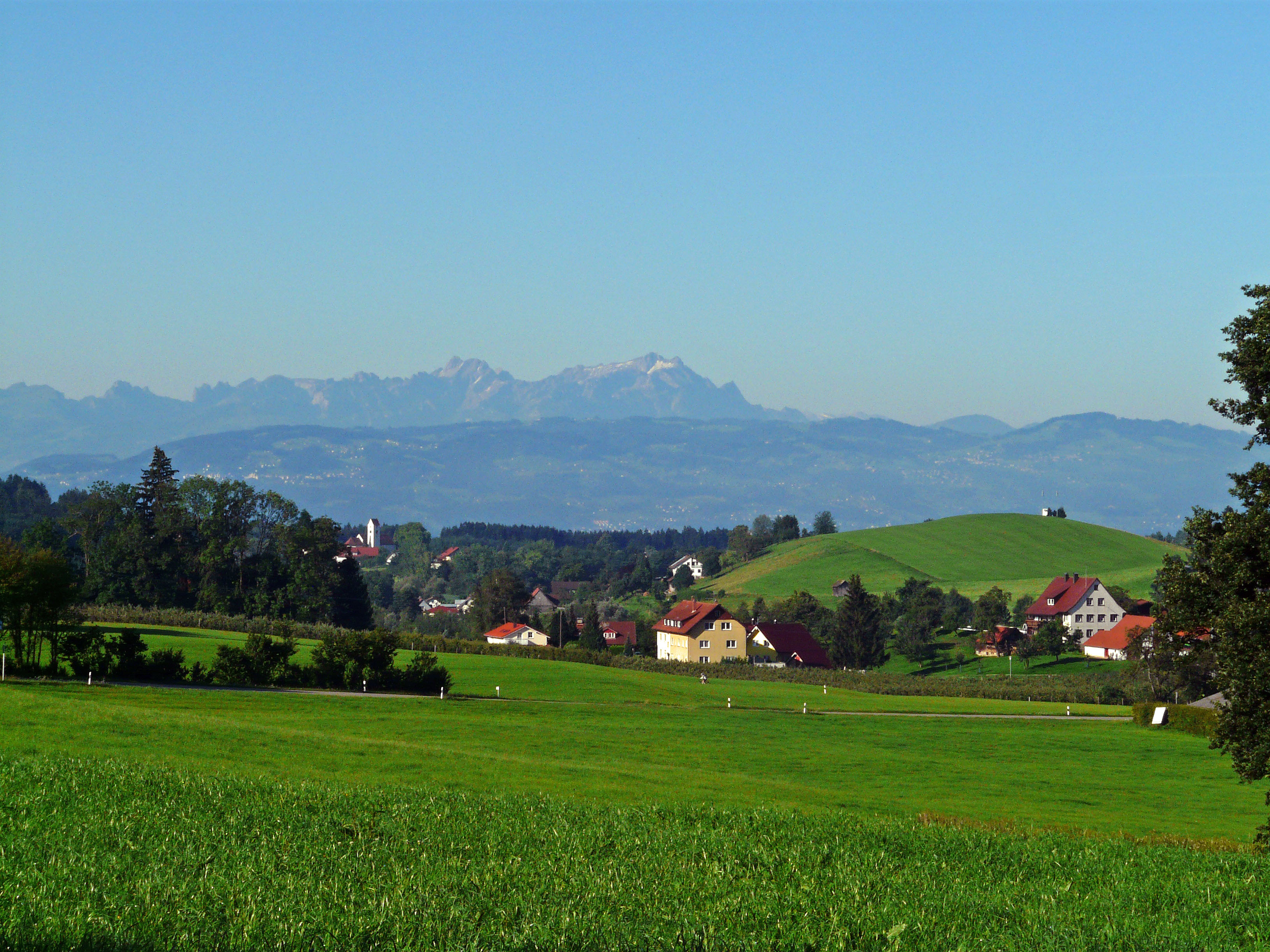
- Weißensberg

- Coat of arms

- Location of Weißensberg within Lindau district
- Interactive map of Weißensberg
- Location within Germany Location within Bavaria
- Coordinates: 47°34′N 9°43′E
- Country: Germany
- State: Bavaria
- Admin. region: Schwaben
- District: Lindau
- Municipal assoc.: Sigmarszell

Government
  - Mayor (2020–26): Hans Kern

Area
  - Total: 7.84 km^{2} (3.03 sq mi)
- Elevation: 470–530 m (1,540–1,740 ft)

Population (2025-12-31)
  - Total: 2,716
  - Density: 346/km^{2} (897/sq mi)
- Time zone: UTC+01:00 (CET)
  - Summer (DST): UTC+02:00 (CEST)
- Postal codes: 88138
- Dialling codes: 08389
- Vehicle registration: LI
- Website: www.weissensberg.de

Weißensberg is a municipality in the district of Lindau in Bavaria in Germany.

Until 1955, Weißensberg belonged to the Bavarian district of Lindau, which back then belonged in the French occupation zone. As a result, the entire tax revenue remained “in the state of Lindau”. After the currency reform, all school desks were replaced, and in 1949 a third classroom was set up on the first floor.
