= Langenargen =

- Municipality
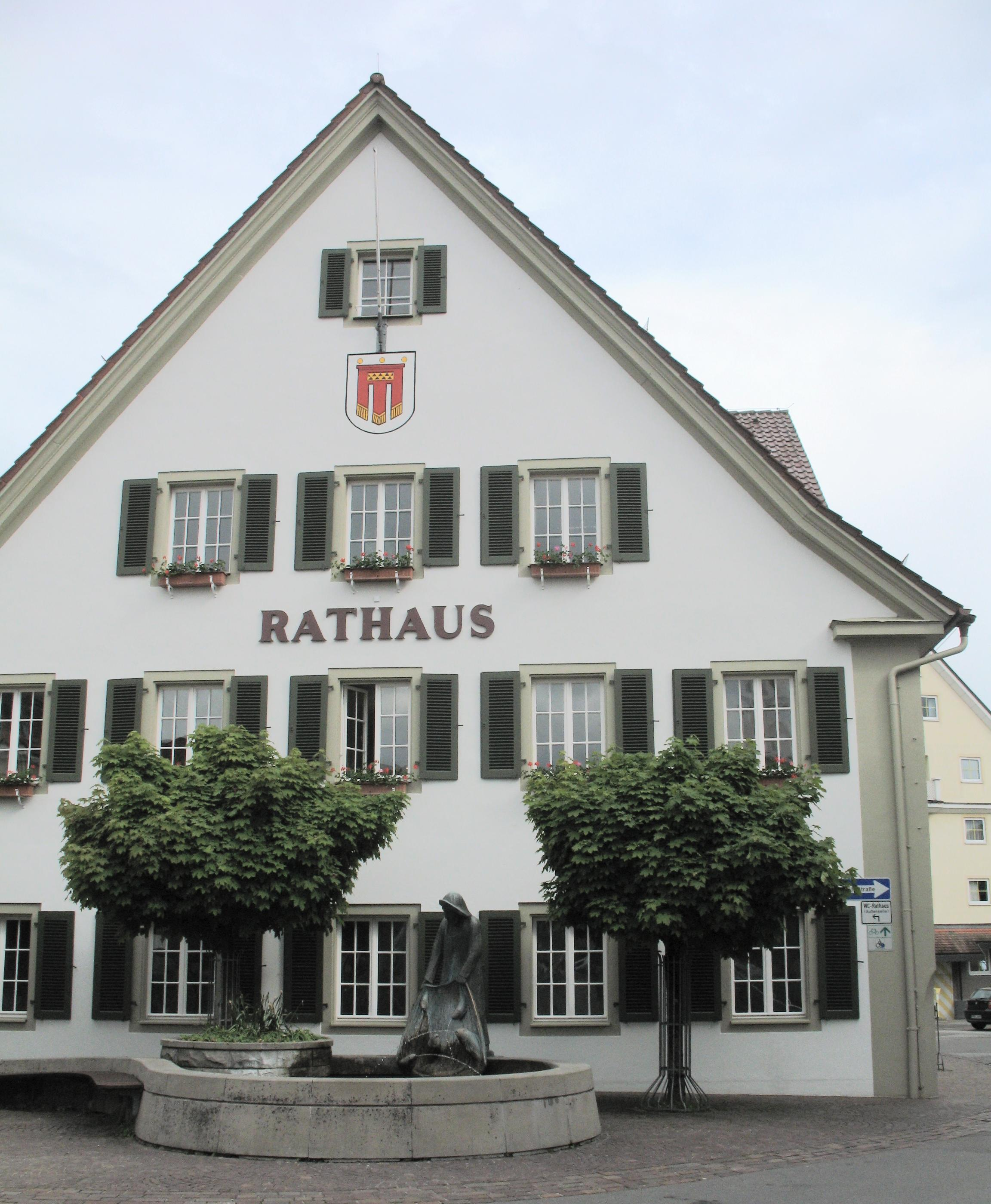
- Town hall

- Coat of arms

- Location of Langenargen within Bodenseekreis district
- Interactive map of Langenargen
- Location within Germany Location within Baden-Württemberg
- Coordinates: 47°36′00″N 09°32′30″E
- Country: Germany
- State: Baden-Württemberg
- Admin. region: Tübingen
- District: Bodenseekreis

Government
  - Mayor (2020–28): Ole Münder (Ind.)

Area
  - Total: 15.27 km^{2} (5.90 sq mi)
- Elevation: 399 m (1,309 ft)

Population (2025-12-31)
  - Total: 7,708
  - Density: 504.8/km^{2} (1,307/sq mi)
- Time zone: UTC+01:00 (CET)
  - Summer (DST): UTC+02:00 (CEST)
- Postal codes: 88085
- Dialling codes: 07543
- Vehicle registration: FN
- Website: www.langenargen.de

Langenargen (German pronunciation: [ˈlaŋənˌʔaʁɡn̩]) is a town in the district of Bodenseekreis in Baden-Württemberg in Germany.

== Demographics ==
Population development:

Year	Inhabitants	Year	Inhabitants
1871	1,593	1990	6,598
1890	1,536	1994	6,999
1900	1,613	1998	7,116
1925	2,276	2002	7,314
1933	3,100	2006	7,554
1939	3,100	2010	7,803
1950	3,539	2014	7,848
1961	4,217	2015	7,863
1970	5,253	2017	7,778
1987	6,073	2018	7,721

== Sports ==
Langenargen is an ideal venue for sports such as sailing. The town's location on the shores of the Bodensee (Lake Constance) provides smooth waters even when windy. Langenargen is the host city of Match Race Germany, part of the World Match Racing Tour. The event draws the world's best sailing teams to Langenargen in a battle of nerve and skill on the water. The identical supplied boats (Bavaria-35 Match) are raced two at a time in an on the water dogfight which tests the sailors and skippers to the limits of their physical abilities. Points accrued count towards the World Match Racing Tour and a place in the final event, with the overall winner taking the title ISAF World Match Racing Tour Champion. Match racing is an ideal sport for spectators in Langenargen and neighbouring towns, as racing in close proximity to the shore provides excellent heart of the action views for the audience. Match Race Germany through the World Match racing Tour and the associated supporting cultural events have helped raise the international profile of Langenargen as well as providing a boost to the economy and local businesses.

== Twin towns — sister cities ==
Langenargen is twinned with:

- Arbon, Switzerland (1963)
- Höckendorf, Germany (1990)
- Bois-le-Roi, Seine-et-Marne, France (1991)
- Noli, Italy (2005)
