= Neukirch, Baden-Württemberg =

Neukirch
- Municipality
- Coat of arms

- Location of Neukirch within Bodenseekreis district
- Interactive map of Neukirch
- Location within Germany Location within Baden-Württemberg
- Coordinates: 47°39′30″N 09°42′15″E
- Country: Germany
- State: Baden-Württemberg
- Admin. region: Tübingen
- District: Bodenseekreis

Government
  - Mayor (2017–25): Reinhold Schnell

Area
  - Total: 26.59 km^{2} (10.27 sq mi)
- Elevation: 570 m (1,870 ft)

Population (2025-12-31)
  - Total: 2,726
  - Density: 102.5/km^{2} (265.5/sq mi)
- Time zone: UTC+01:00 (CET)
  - Summer (DST): UTC+02:00 (CEST)
- Postal codes: 88099
- Dialling codes: 07528
- Vehicle registration: FN
- Website: www.neukirch-gemeinde.de

Neukirch (German pronunciation: [ˈnɔʏkɪʁç]) is a town in the district of Bodensee in Baden-Württemberg in Germany.

== Demographics ==
Population development:

Year	Inhabitants
1990	2,243
2001	2,649
2011	2,627
2021	2,711
