= Sigmarszell =

- Municipality
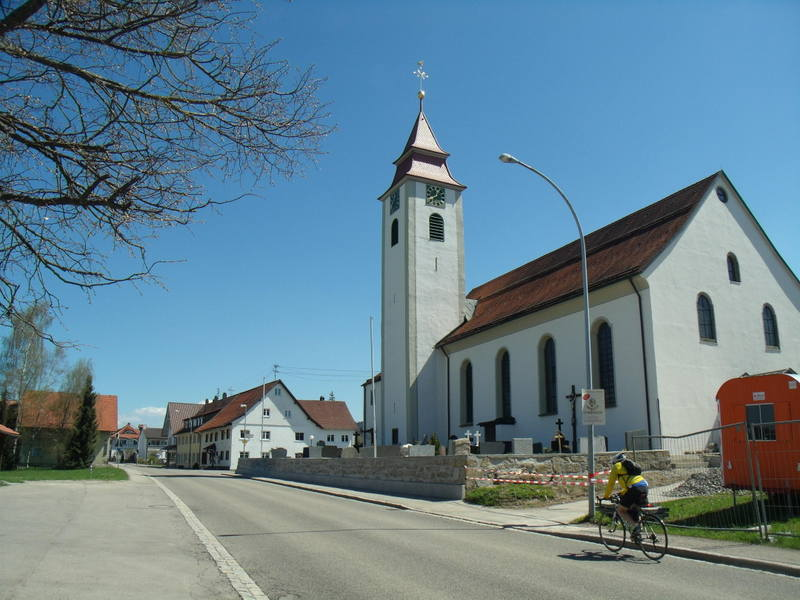
- Church of Saints Peter and Paul in Niederstaufen

- Coat of arms

- Location of Sigmarszell within Lindau district
- Interactive map of Sigmarszell
- Location within Germany Location within Bavaria
- Coordinates: 47°34′20″N 9°39′40″E
- Country: Germany
- State: Bavaria
- Admin. region: Schwaben
- District: Lindau
- Municipal assoc.: Sigmarszell

Government
  - Mayor (2020–26): Jörg Agthe

Area
  - Total: 16.01 km^{2} (6.18 sq mi)
- Elevation: 482 m (1,581 ft)

Population (2025-12-31)
  - Total: 2,911
  - Density: 181.8/km^{2} (470.9/sq mi)
- Time zone: UTC+01:00 (CET)
  - Summer (DST): UTC+02:00 (CEST)
- Postal codes: 88138
- Dialling codes: 08382, 08388 and 08389
- Vehicle registration: LI
- Website: www.sigmarszell.de

Sigmarszell is a municipality in the district of Lindau in Bavaria in Germany. It lies on the border with Austria, few kilometers from the Lake Bodensee.
