= Westallgäu =

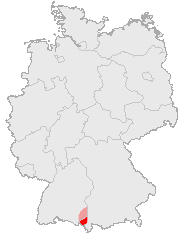

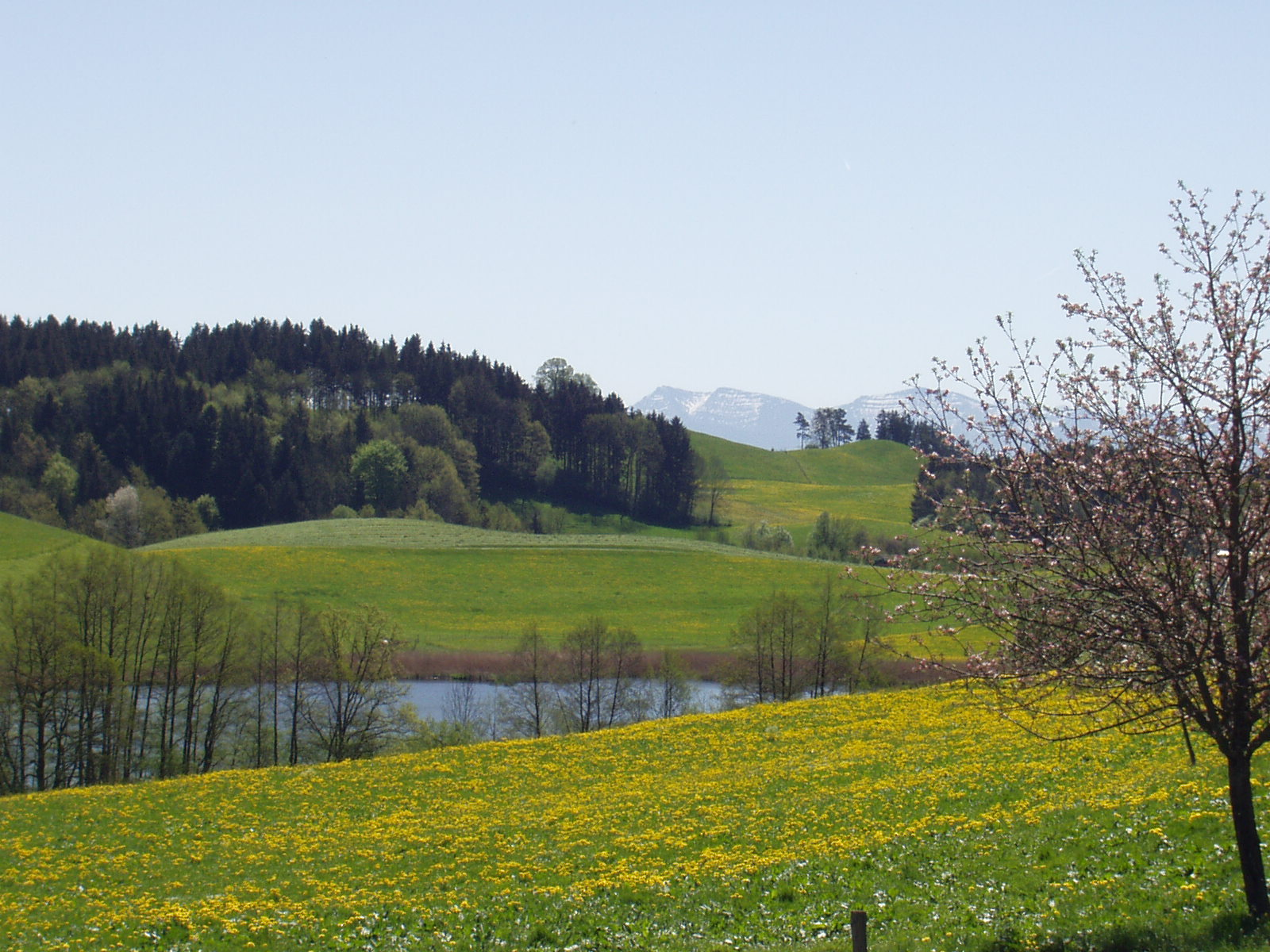
Westallgäu near Amtzell

Westallgäu (German pronunciation: [ˈvɛstˌʔalɡɔɪ̯]) is the western part of the Allgäu in Germany. It contains large parts of the districts of Lindau in the southwest of the region, Swabia in Bavaria and the district of Ravensburg in the southeast of Baden-Württemberg. Westallgäu extends to the north to, amongst others, the towns of Leutkirch, Wangen and Isny. Westallgäu is bordered by Oberallgäu to the east and the Austrian state (Land) of Vorarlberg to the south. To the southwest, Westallgäu borders Lake Constance through the town of Lindau. The Adelegg mountains located in Westallgäu represent foothills of the Alps, reaching an altitude of 1,118 m at the Schwarzer Grat ("Black Ridge").

== Towns and municipalities ==
- Gestratz
- Grünenbach
- Heimenkirch
- Hergatz
- Hergensweiler
- Lindenberg
- Maierhöfen
- Oberreute
- Opfenbach
- Röthenbach
- Scheidegg-Scheffau
- Sigmarszell
- Stiefenhofen
- Weiler-Simmerberg
- Amtzell
- Argenbühl
- Arnach
- Bad Wurzach
- Bodnegg
- Friesenhofen
- Isny
- Karsee
- Kisslegg
- Leutkirch
- Schlier
- Urlau
- Waldburg
- Wangen
- Wolfegg
