= Scheidegg, Bavaria =

Scheidegg
- Municipality
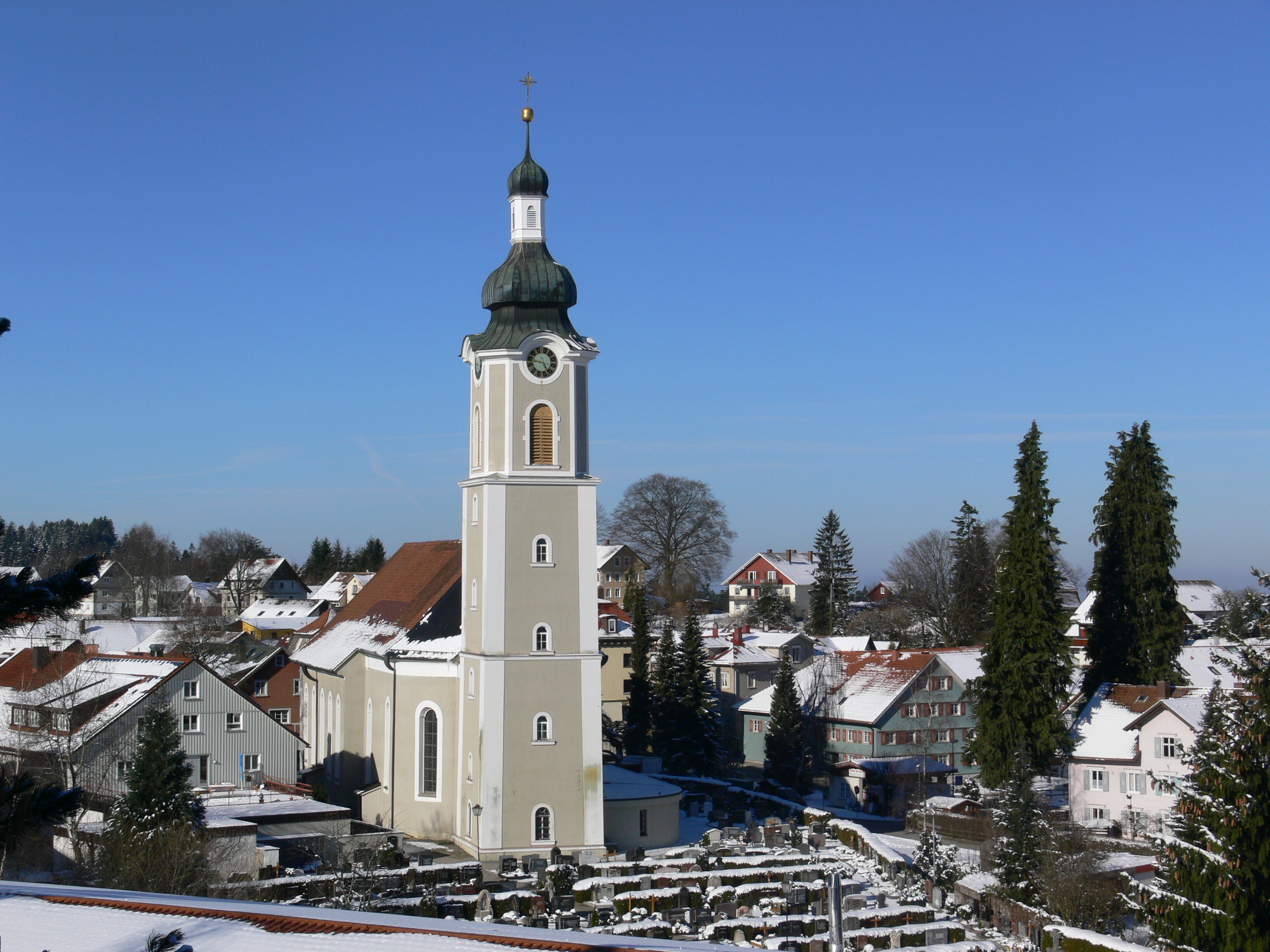
- Church of Saint Gall

- Coat of arms

- Location of Scheidegg within Lindau district
- Interactive map of Scheidegg
- Location within Germany Location within Bavaria
- Coordinates: 47°34′56″N 09°50′56″E
- Country: Germany
- State: Bavaria
- Admin. region: Schwaben
- District: Lindau

Government
  - Mayor (2020–26): Ulrich Pfanner (CSU)

Area
  - Total: 27.36 km^{2} (10.56 sq mi)
- Elevation: 800–1,000 m (2,600–3,300 ft)

Population (2025-12-31)
  - Total: 4,475
  - Density: 163.6/km^{2} (423.6/sq mi)
- Time zone: UTC+01:00 (CET)
  - Summer (DST): UTC+02:00 (CEST)
- Postal codes: 88175
- Dialling codes: 08381 (Scheidegg) 08387 (Scheffau)
- Vehicle registration: LI
- Website: https://www.scheidegg.de/

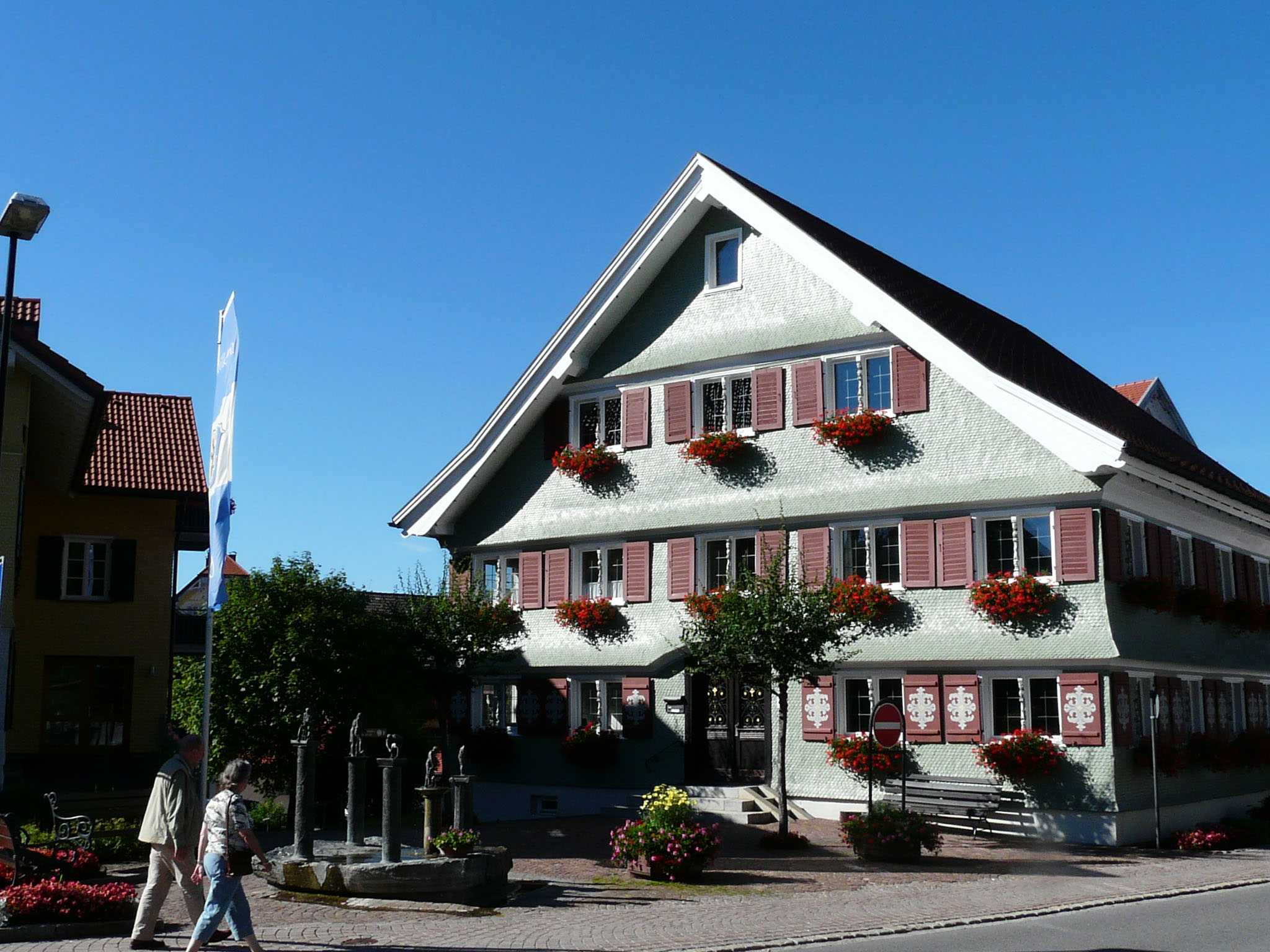
Town hall

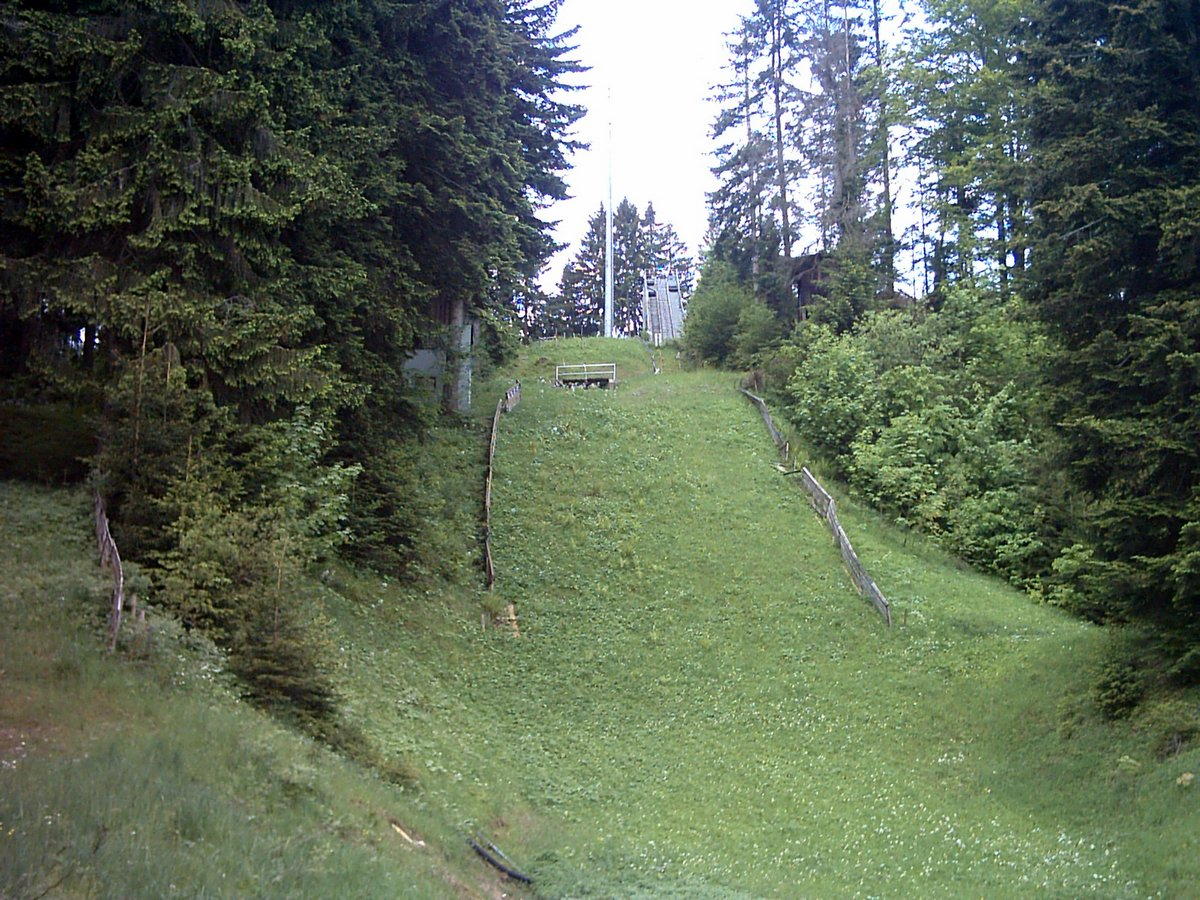
Felsenschanze ski-jumping ramp

Scheidegg (German pronunciation: [ˈʃaɪdɛk]) is a market town and municipality in the district of Lindau in Bavaria in Germany and a licensed Kneipp cure spa and open-air health resort.

== Geography ==
Located in the Westallgäu region, the municipality of Scheidegg consists of the town of Scheidegg and the district of Scheffau. To the west and south, the municipality borders on the Bregenz Forest, which is part of the Austrian state of Vorarlberg.

== History ==
The area around Scheidegg was most likely settled for the first time in the 6th and 7th centuries by the Alamanni. Until 1481 it belonged to Weiler and was - due to the document being lost - first mentioned in 1255 in St. Gallen. The imperial Benedictine abbey of St. Gallen promoted Christianity. In 1296, Abbot Wilhelm sold Scheidegg to Count Hugo of Bregenz (Montfort). The area, which the Habsburgs had purchased in 1571, remained part of Vorarlberg until the Treaty of Pressburg in 1805 (Napoleon), and later became part of Bavaria.

The tradition of Scheidegg as a spa and tourist location dates to the turn of the 20th century. When the first summer visitors came to Scheidegg after the construction of the railway line from Röthenbach to Scheidegg, the first attempt to attract tourism was made by founding the Association for Transport and Beautification in 1902. The construction of the Prinzregent-Luitpold-Kinderklinik (a paedriatic clinic) in 1912 was the cornerstone for the development of Scheidegg into a spa. In 1936 Scheidegg became a licensed air-health resort. A new start was required after World War II. The importance of officially qualifying as a spa was soon acknowledged, and hence the first licensed kneippism business was established in 1964.

In 1972, the municipalities of Scheidegg und Scheffau were merged as part of the municipal reform in Bavaria.

== Tourism ==
Scheidegg has a capacity of about 3,200 guests. Every year about 450,000 stays are booked. Consequently, Scheidegg is among the 10 largest spas and tourist resorts in the Allgäu/Swabia region.

== Culture and sights ==
The Catholic parish church of St. Gallus, featuring paintings by Ludwig Glötzle from Munich, can be found in the town centre, and the Lutheran Auferstehungskirche (Church of the Resurrection) contains an accessible maze created by the artist Max Schmelcher in 2001. Scheidegg has 13 chapels in its vicinity, one of which is ecumenical. All the chapels are connected with the aforementioned churches and the Kreuzberg by the small and large ecumenical chapel route, which is unique in Germany. Scheidegg is located on the Westallgäuer Käsestraße (Westallgäu cheese route), and the local alpine dairy in the district of Böserscheidegg can be visited, including a tasting of Allgäuer Emmentaler and other local cheeses. Other attractions include the reptile zoo, the museum of local history and the Scheidegger Wasserfälle (Scheidegg waterfalls). There are the "Original Scheidegger Wasserfälle", with a service and parking lot, as well as the surrounding waterfalls: Hasenreuter Wasserfälle, Schwedenhöhle and Rickenbachfälle.

== Notable people living in Scheidegg ==
- Tobias Steinhauser, cyclist
