= Kubat (singer) =

Turkish singer (born 1974)

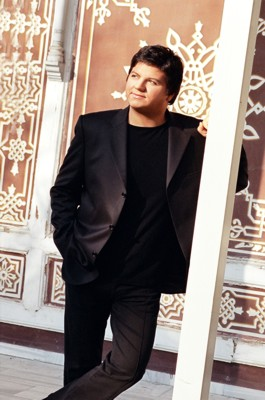

Background information
- Born: Ramazan Kubat; 4 October 1974 (age 51); Antwerp, Belgium
- Origin: Turkey
- Genres: Turkish folk music, Turkish pop music
- Occupation: Singer-songwriter
- Years active: 1980–present
- Website: Kubat.com

Ramazan Kubat (born 4 October 1974), better known as Kubat, is a Turkish singer and composer distinguished with his particular style and his applied use of electronic instruments in his songs. He is known for his Turkish folk music performances as well as his Turkish pop music performances like Karaağaç.

== Early life ==
Kubat was born in Antwerp in 1974. His father was an Alevi Muslim Turk and his mother is a Sunni Muslim Turk from Karacalar village in Emirdağ. His uncle is a hafiz from the same village. He has been based in Turkey for over a decade, and was advantaged by the opportunities and outlets his talents found already at a very early age. He started to play his father's "cura" (a smaller version of bağlama) at the age of five, he sang in a restaurant at age eight and was even admitted in his teens into a 300-member church choir as its only Muslim member according to his web site. His family has an artistic background: his uncle Şemsettin Kubat is an important poet of Turkish folk literature who is based in Emirdağ.

== Career ==
Based principally in Turkey since the end the 1980s, Kubat released his first album, carrying the same title as his stage name, Kubat, in 1996. In 2001 he released the album Arşiv 1-2-3, consisting of a set with three albums uniting 35 anonymous Turkish folk songs. This album was notable in displaying Kubat reaching deep into the traditions, to come out strengthened in his art. The album was accompanied by an 80-page booklet prepared in eight languages giving details of the story related to each song. His 2003 album Lokman on the other hand was a tentative tour de force encompassing diverse influences from rock music, pop music, jazz and classical music introduced into Turkish folk music. His efforts for combining the traditions with international and novel elements were consecrated in a huge concert in 2002, conducted by René Giessen, titled Anadolu Güneşi (Anatolian Sun) and held in Istanbul Lütfi Kırdar Convention and Exhibition Center. In 2015 he sang the theme song of the Japanese-Turkish drama film 125 Years Memory, titled Ertuğrul Türküsü.

== Discography ==
=== Albums ===
- Kubat (1996)
- Bugün (Today) (1998)
- Bir Ayrılık, Bir Yoksulluk Bir Ölüm (A separation, a poverty, a death) (1999)
- Arşiv 1-2-3 (Archive 1-2-3) (2001)
- Lokman (2003)
- Yare Doğru (Towards the loved one) (2005)
- Kubat 2008 (2008)
- İnce İnce (2010)
- İyi Olcaksın (2013)
- Al Ömrümü (2016)
- Türküyüz (Turkish Folk Music) (2018)

== Filmography ==
- 2011: Eyyvah Eyvah 2
- 2013: Leyla ile Mecnun
- 2013: Güldür Güldür
- 2014: Arkadaşım Hoşgeldin
- 2020: Kalk Gidelim
