= Maierhöfen =

- Municipality
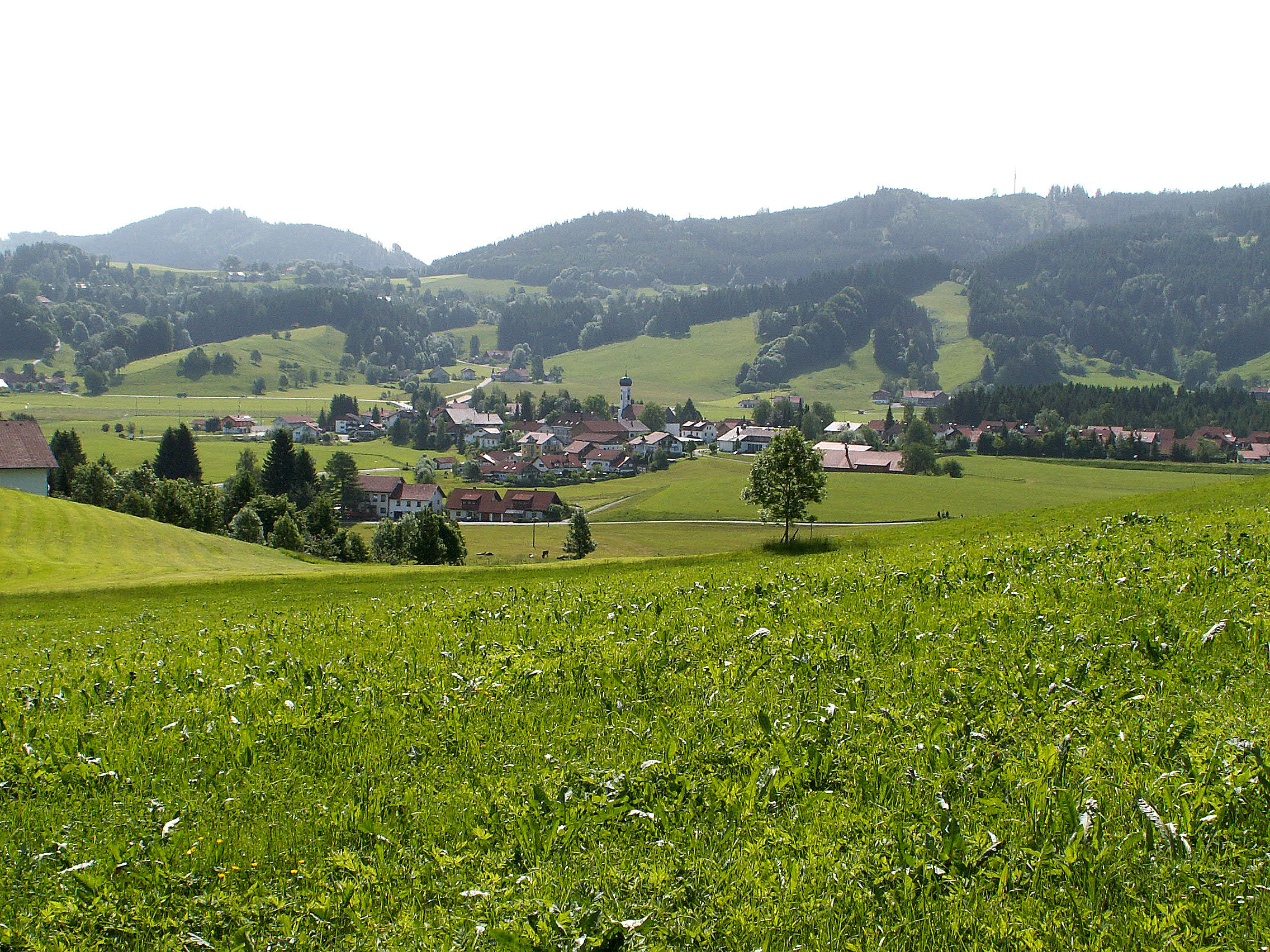
- Maierhöfen seen from the west

- Coat of arms

- Location of Maierhöfen within Lindau district
- Interactive map of Maierhöfen
- Location within Germany Location within Bavaria
- Coordinates: 47°38′N 10°3′E
- Country: Germany
- State: Bavaria
- Admin. region: Schwaben
- District: Lindau
- Municipal assoc.: Argental

Government
  - Mayor (2020–26): Martin Schwarz

Area
  - Total: 17.50 km^{2} (6.76 sq mi)
- Elevation: 741 m (2,431 ft)

Population (2025-12-31)
  - Total: 1,494
  - Density: 85.37/km^{2} (221.1/sq mi)
- Time zone: UTC+01:00 (CET)
  - Summer (DST): UTC+02:00 (CEST)
- Postal codes: 88167
- Dialling codes: 08383
- Vehicle registration: LI
- Website: www.maierhoefen.de

Maierhöfen is a municipality in the district of Lindau in Bavaria in Germany.

== Geography ==
Maierhöfen is located in the Westallgäu, Allgäu region.

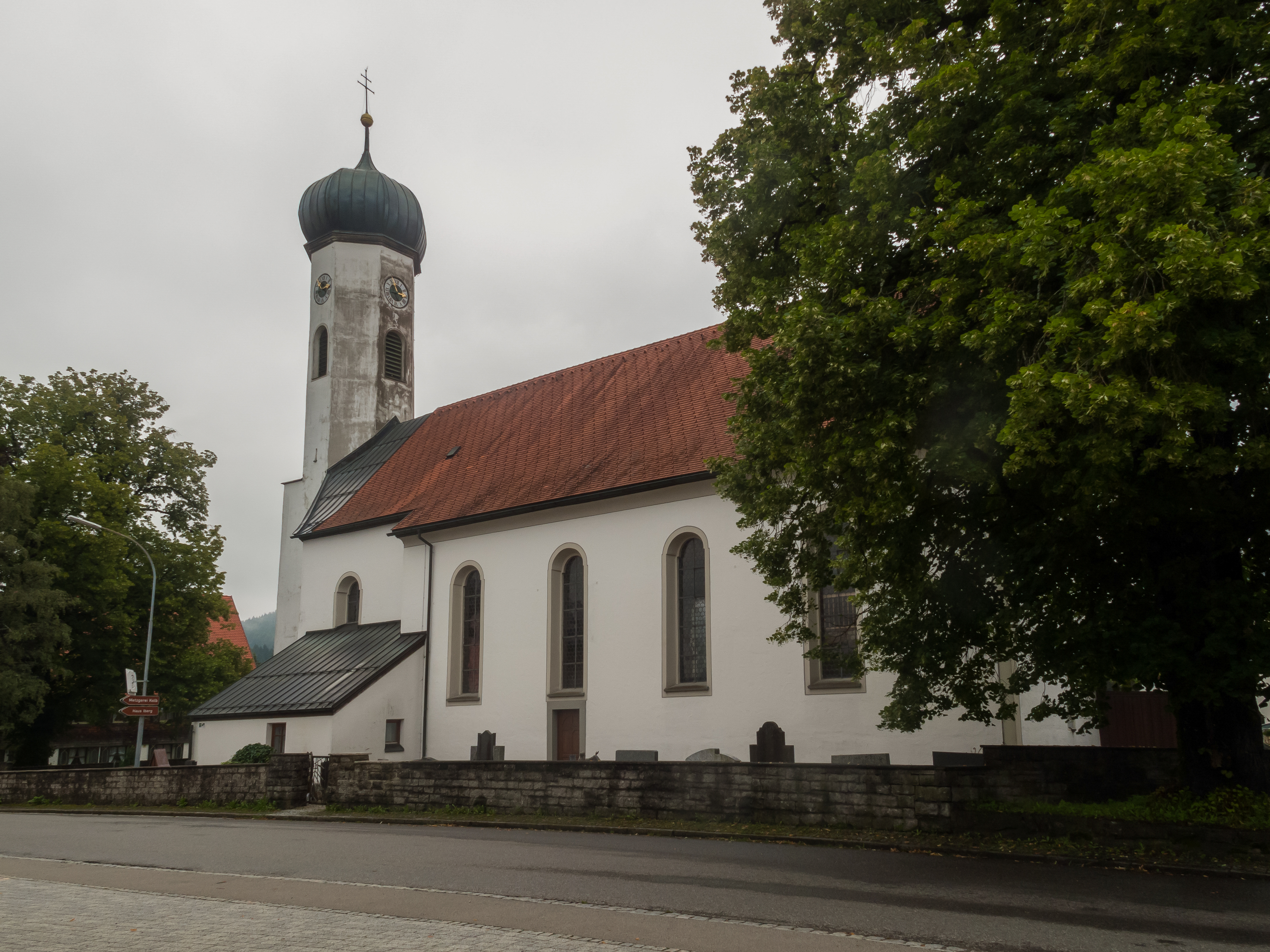
Church of Saint Gebhard

== History ==
Before becoming a part of Bavaria, Maierhöfen belonged to Austria as a part of the Bregenz-Hohenegg authority. Since the signing of the peace treaties of Brünn and Preßburg in 1805 the town belongs to Bavaria. In the course of the administrative reforms in Bavaria the contemporary municipality was formed by the "Gemeindeedikt" of 1818.

== Population development ==
In 1970 1,133, in 1987 1,306 and in 2000 1,503 inhabitants were living in the municipality of Gestratz.

== Politics ==
The mayor of the town is Martin Schwarz (Wählergemeinschaft).

The revenue from the municipal tax added up to 434,000 € in 1999, of which the net business tax amounted to 28,000 €.

== Culture and notable sights ==
- Eistobel
- Hengelesweiher
- Ski lifts at the Flucken and Iberg

== Economy and infrastructure ==
=== Economy, agriculture and forestry ===
According to the official statistics, in 1998 there were 62 employees who were subject to social insurance contribution in the industrial sector and none the sector of trade and transport at place of work. In miscellaneous sectors there were 242 people employed at place of work. At place of domicile there were 375 employees altogether. In the industrial sector there were none, in the main construction trade six businesses. Moreover, there were 60 agricultural businesses in 1999 with a total area of 1,150 ha.

=== Education ===
In 1999 there were the following institutions:

- Kindergartens: 50 kindergarten places with 52 children

== Notable people ==
=== Notable people living in Maierhöfen ===
- René Giessen (born 1944), German musician
