= Michael Kitzelmann =

German soldier

Michael Kitzelmann (29 January 1916 in Horben, part of Gestratz, Westallgäu, Bavaria – 11 June 1942 in Orel Prison) was a lieutenant in the German Army during World War II, who was executed for undermining military strength.

== Life ==
=== Aspiring theologian ===
Kitzelmann came from a devout Catholic family. With the support of his teacher and his pastor in 1928 he joined the Gymnasium in Dillingen an der Donau. He graduated from the Catholic minor seminary in 1936 with the Abitur. In the same year he completed his compulsory six months with the Reich Labor Service (Reichsarbeitsdienst) in Pfronten-Ried and began September 1936 with a three-semester study at the Theological Academy of St. Stephen in Augsburg with the aim of becoming a priest.

In 1937 he applied for an additional teacher at the Hochschule in Munich-Pasing. They rejected his request because he was not willing to enter into the prescribed Nazi organizations.

=== Officer in the army ===
To do his military service Kitzelmann moved in the summer of 1937 to 20 Infantry Regiment in Lindau, but then as a volunteer and officer candidate in the 91st Infanterie-Regiment. He was however not inspired by the life of a soldier:

So for two years I have this terrible yoke ridiculous and desolate military drill stand. I think it's pretty soul-destroying after a few weeks.

Before the two years' service ended, the war began. In March 1938 Kitzelmann was involved in the German invasion of Austria and 1939 in the German attack on Poland. He was promoted to corporal. He wrote to his parents:

The horrific images that I had to watch on the field with corpses have so deeply engraved in my soul that I shall never forget.

In June 1941 the attack on the USSR began with Operation Barbarossa. In July 1941 he took part in the Battle of Smolensk, and the early stages of the Siege of Leningrad. In letters to the parents and in discussions with army comrades, he spoke about his Christian critique of war and destruction of those responsible:

The only thought and desire of each person is only that the war end, and leave Russia to return to the homeland."

In the winter of 1941 he was assigned to a unit fighting partisans. In the period January to May 1942, he was a witness to atrocities that the Einsatzgruppen committed on the Russian population and crimes against the Jews. Traumatized and shocked by these experiences Kitzelmann began after an examination of his conscience, to hate the Nazis and openly criticize commands. His attitude resulting from a Christian rejection of war and the Nazi leaders responsible was apparent in his letters home and interviews with fellow soldiers de:Michael Kitzelmann#cite note-Schweizer-1:

=== The end ===
A comrade denounced him in March 1942, when he was being treated for an injury in a hospital. He returned to his division and was arrested in early April. On Good Friday 1942, the court-martial sentenced him to death for undermining military force.

Michael Kitzelmann was shaken by the tragic absurdity of his sentence, but not particularly surprised. He was company commander at twenty-four, awarded the Iron Cross Second Class for bravery in battle, and the Wound Badge in Gold for seven stays in field hospitals. His mother, a peasant woman from the Allgäu, tried to save him. She went to Berlin and tried to file a petition to the Supreme Court, but it was dismissed.

Kitzelmann was executed on 11 June 1942 in Orel prison. Before his execution, he forgave the sergeant who had betrayed him.

The Bundestag, on 8 September 2009, rehabilitated him 64 years after the war. The Legal Committee of the Bundestag unanimously adopted a recommendation that that decision be adopted by parliament, on 26 August 2009. In May 1986, the Johann-Michael-Sailer-school in Dillingen an der Donau dedicated this plaque:

Michael Kitzelmann, graduate of 1936, executed on 11 June 1942. He died for the freedom of thought and belief.
