= Stiefenhofen (Verwaltungsgemeinschaft) =

- Verwaltungsgemeinschaft
- Location of Stiefenhofen within Lindau district
- Interactive map of Stiefenhofen
- Location within Germany Location within Bavaria
- Coordinates: 47°36′N 10°00′E
- Country: Germany
- State: Bavaria
- Admin. region: Swabia
- District: Lindau
- Seat: Stiefenhofen
- Subdivisions: 2 municipalities

Area
  - Total: 42.46 km^{2} (16.39 sq mi)

Population (2025-12-31)
  - Total: 3,556
  - Density: 83.75/km^{2} (216.9/sq mi)
- Time zone: UTC+01:00 (CET)
  - Summer (DST): UTC+02:00 (CEST)
- Website: www.vg-stiefenhofen.de

Stiefenhofen is a Verwaltungsgemeinschaft (municipal association) in the district of Lindau in Bavaria, Germany. Its seat is in Stiefenhofen.

It consists of the following municipalities:

1. Oberreute
2. Stiefenhofen
