= Oberreute =

- Municipality
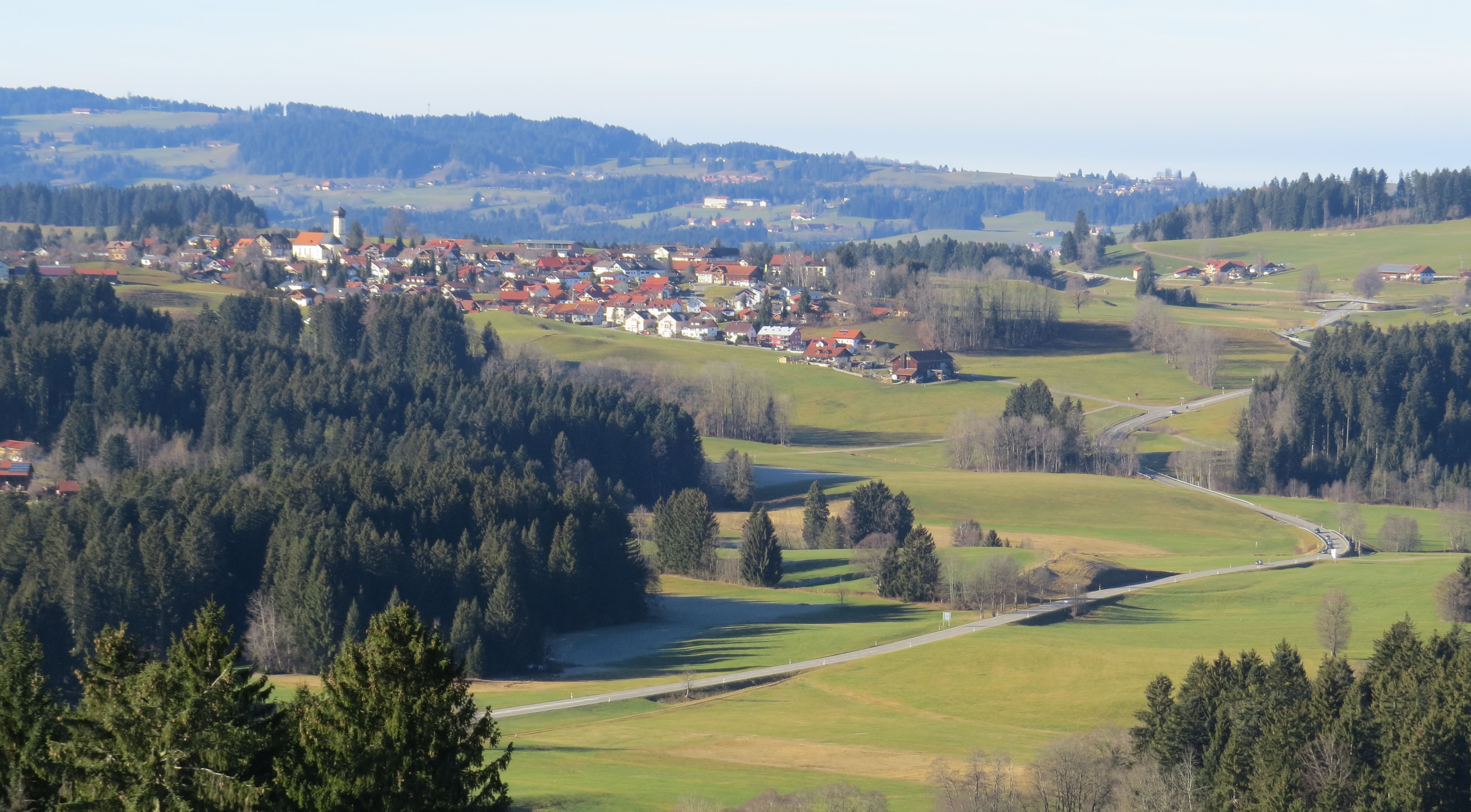
- Oberreute seen from the east

- Coat of arms

- Location of Oberreute within Lindau district
- Interactive map of Oberreute
- Location within Germany Location within Bavaria
- Coordinates: 47°34′N 9°56′E
- Country: Germany
- State: Bavaria
- Admin. region: Schwaben
- District: Lindau
- Municipal assoc.: Stiefenhofen

Government
  - Mayor (2020–26): Stefan Schneider

Area
  - Total: 13.49 km^{2} (5.21 sq mi)
- Elevation: 860–1,041 m (2,822–3,415 ft)

Population (2025-12-31)
  - Total: 1,678
  - Density: 124.4/km^{2} (322.2/sq mi)
- Time zone: UTC+01:00 (CET)
  - Summer (DST): UTC+02:00 (CEST)
- Postal codes: 88179
- Dialling codes: 08387
- Vehicle registration: LI
- Website: www.oberreute.de

Oberreute is a municipality in the district of Lindau in Bavaria in Germany and member of the municipal association of Stiefenhofen. It is an acknowledged air health resort.

== Geography ==
Oberreute is located in the Allgäu region, on the border with Austria.

== History ==
The contemporary districts of Stadels and Schönebühl once were seat of a court. Oberreute was not formed until the end of the 18th century. In 1797 the first church was built by inhabitants. The town had been part of the Austrian authority of Bregenz-Hohenegg. Since the signing of the peace treaties of Brünn and Preßburg in 1805 the municipality belongs to Bavaria.

=== Population development ===
In 1970 1,040, in 1987 1,283 and in 2000 1,471 inhabitants were living in the municipality of Oberreute.

== Politics ==
The mayor of the town is Stefan Schneider.

The revenue from the municipal tax added up to 693,000 € in 1999, of which the net business tax amounted to 101,000 €.

== Economy and infrastructure ==
=== Economy, agriculture and forestry ===
According to the official statistics, in 1998 there were neither employees who were subject to social insurance contribution in the industrial sector, nor in the sector of trade and transport at place of work. At place of domicile there were 459 employees altogether. In the industrial sector there were six, in the main construction trade two businesses. Moreover, there were 54 agricultural businesses in 1999 with a total area of 881 ha.

=== Education ===
In 1999 there were the following institutions:

- Kindergartens: 50 kindergarten places and 49 children
- An elementary school with four teachers and 82 students
