= Nonnenhorn =

- Municipality
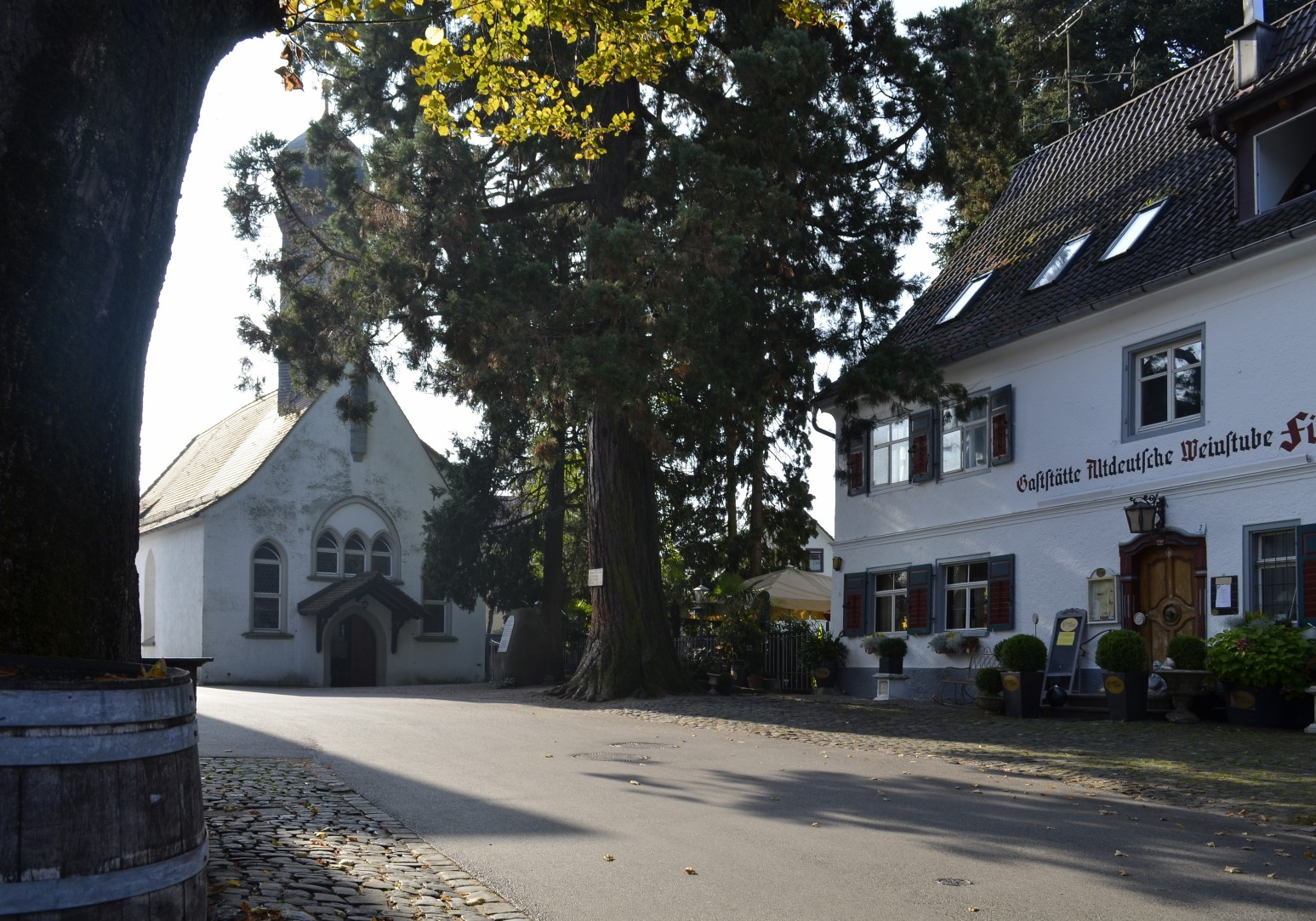
- Kapellenplatz with St. Jacob's Chapel and Giant Sequoia

- Coat of arms

- Location of Nonnenhorn within Lindau district
- Interactive map of Nonnenhorn
- Location within Germany Location within Bavaria
- Coordinates: 47°34′31″N 9°36′37″E
- Country: Germany
- State: Bavaria
- Admin. region: Schwaben
- District: Lindau

Government
  - Mayor (2020–26): Rainer Krauß

Area
  - Total: 1.96 km^{2} (0.76 sq mi)
- Elevation: 404 m (1,325 ft)

Population (2025-12-31)
  - Total: 1,779
  - Density: 908/km^{2} (2,350/sq mi)
- Time zone: UTC+01:00 (CET)
  - Summer (DST): UTC+02:00 (CEST)
- Postal codes: 88149
- Dialling codes: 08382
- Vehicle registration: LI
- Website: www.nonnenhorn.eu

Nonnenhorn is one of the three Bavarian towns on Lake Constance in the Swabian district of Lindau. The air health resort and famous wine town is located between Wasserburg (Bodensee) and Kressbronn am Bodensee (Baden-Württemberg).

== Geography ==
Nonnenhorn is located in the Allgäu region at Lake Constance.

== History ==
In 926 some nuns reportedly went from Nonnenhorn to Wasserburg. In 1592 the earls Fugger from Kirchberg-Weißenhorn acquired the authority of Wasserburg and with it Nonnenhorn. In the year 1763, the Fugger authority became part of Austria. Since the signing of the peace treaties of Brünn and Preßburg in 1805 the town belongs to Bavaria. In the course of the administrative reforms in Bavaria, the contemporary municipality was formed by the "Gemeindeedikt" of 1818.

The Kapellenplatz is the old village center where St. Jacob's Chapel stands, built in the 15th century. The chapel, as well as the neighboring square and buildings, all stand under one of the major tourist attractions of Nonnenhorn, a Giant Sequoia planted in 1880. The entire ensemble, including the Sequoia, is protected by Bavarian law as a historic monument. Controversy erupted in 2019 when a branch of the tree fell in a strong storm and the town council requested permission from Lindau District to have it removed. The Lindau newspaper was told that the tree was essentially healthy, but should be cut down "yesterday instead of tomorrow". The cost of renovating the square in 2020 will be less if the 139-year-old tree is removed first.

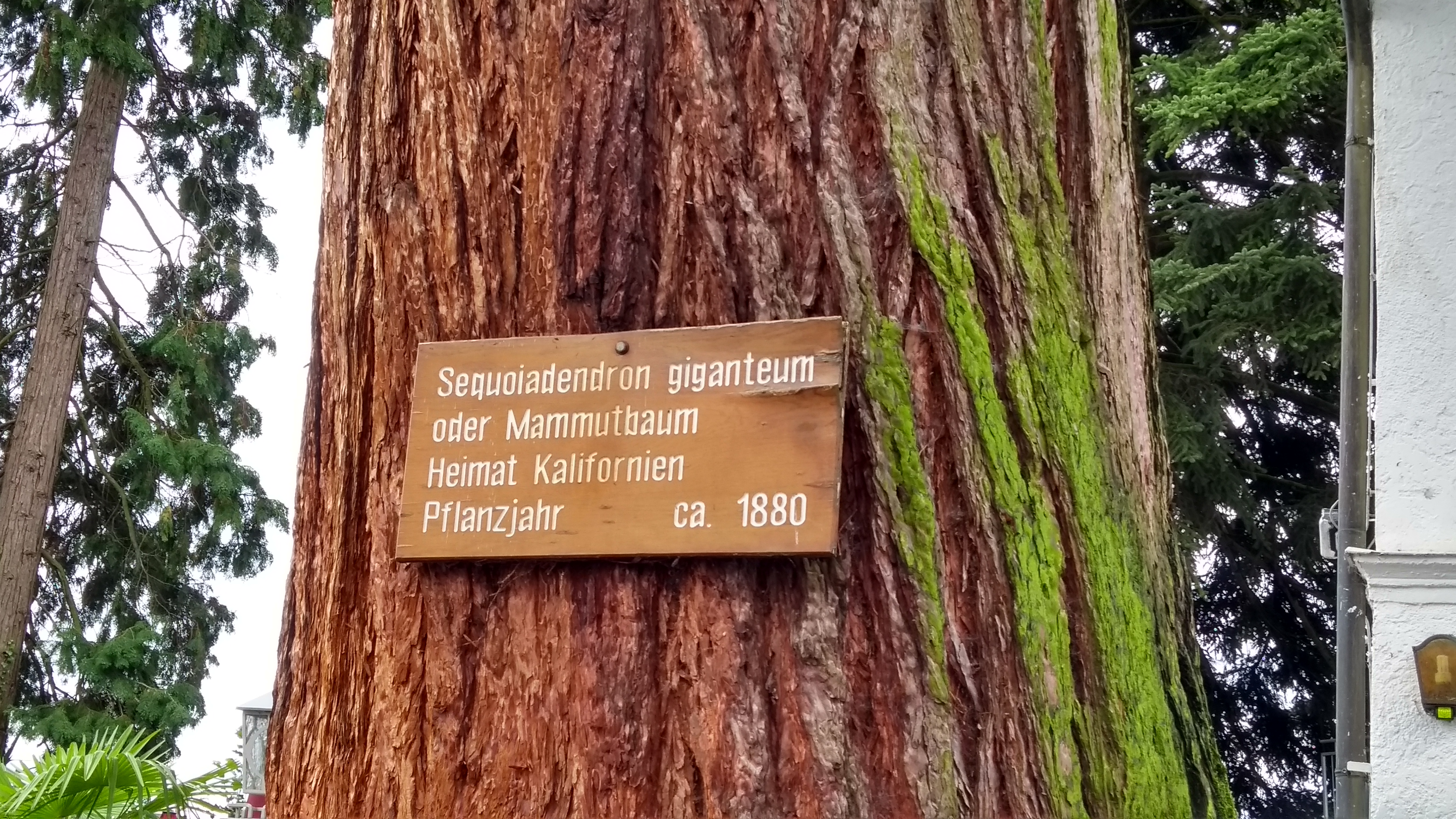
Sign on the Giant Sequoia

=== Population development ===
Historical population
| Year | 1909 | 1970 | 1987 | 2000 | 2009 |
| Pop. | 760 | 1,270 | 1,450 | 1,512 | 1,675 |
| ±% | — | +67.1% | +14.2% | +4.3% | +10.8% |

== Politics ==
The mayor of the town was Michael Hornstein (CSU). He was elected in 2002 as successor to Josef Hornstein (CSU). In 2008 Rainer Krauß (Dorfgemeinschaft) was elected the new mayor. The revenue from the municipal tax added up to €968,000 in 1999, of which the net business tax amounted to €105,000.

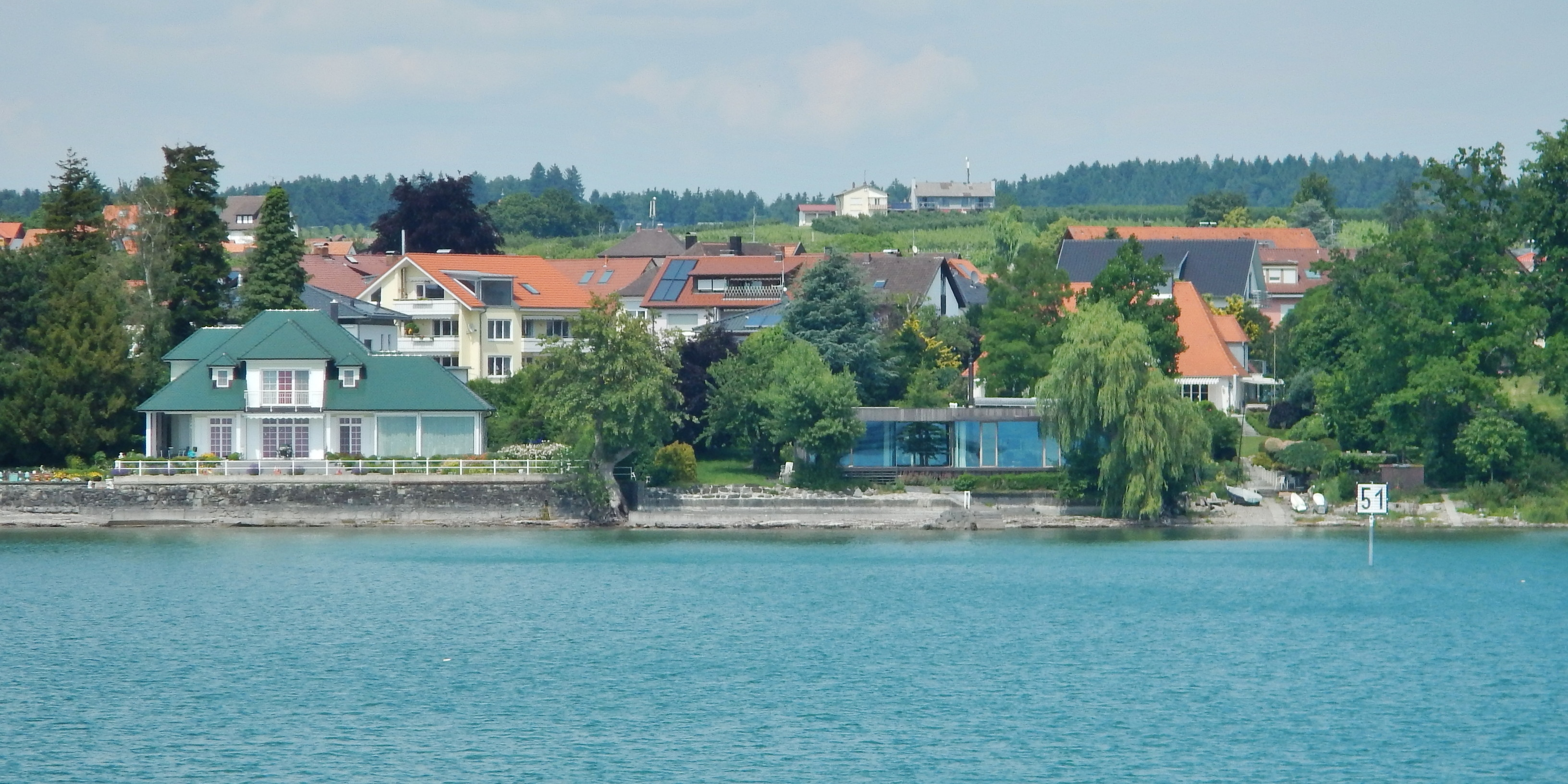
Nonnenhorn with Bodensee (Lake Constance)

== Economy and infrastructure ==
=== Economy, agriculture and forestry ===
According to the official statistics, in 1998 there were ten employees who were subject to social insurance contribution in the agricultural, 80 in the industrial and 24 in the sector of trade and transport at place of work. In miscellaneous sectors there were 104 people employed at place ofwork. At place of domicile there were 445 employees altogether. In the industrial sector there were none, in the main construction trade two businesses. Moreover, there were 30 agricultural businesses in 1999 with a total area of 137 ha. The viniculture plays a mayor role as well as the tourism.

=== Education ===
In 1999 there were the following institutions:

- Kindergartens: 50 kindergarten places and 48 children
- An elementary school with five teachers and 103 students

== Personalities ==
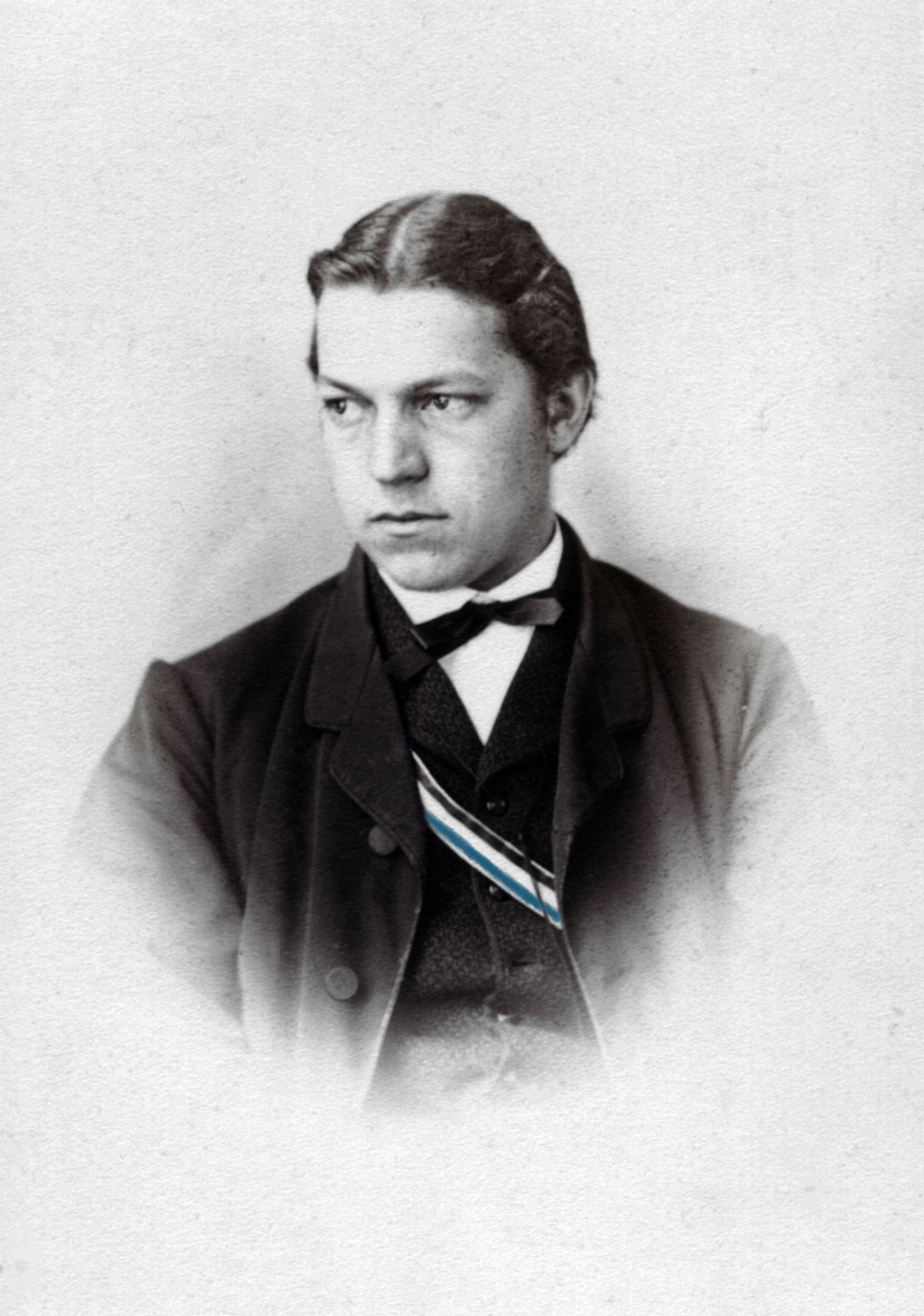
Josef Forster in 1865

- Georg Köberle (1819-1898), writer and dramaturgist
- Josef Forster (physician) (1844-1910), hygienist in Amsterdam and Strasbourg
