= Georg Köberle =

German writer (1819–1898)

Georg Köberle (21 March 1819 in Nonnenhorn, on Lake Constance – 7 June 1898 in Dresden) was a German author and dramatist.

== Biography ==
He studied at the Augsburg Gymnasium and then at the Collegium Germanicum, Rome, from which he ran away. He next studied philosophy and law at Munich.

He went to Leipzig in 1846, where he published Aufzeichnungen eines Jesuitenzöglings im deutschen Kolleg in Rom, which created a sensation, and which he followed up in 1870 with Deutsche Antwort auf welsche Projekte: Enthüllungen über die Palastrevolution im Vatikan. His dramatic career commenced with his five-act play Die Mediceer (Mannheim, 1849), followed by the tragedy Heinrich IV von Frankreich (Leipzig, 1851). Later came the plays Des Künstlers Weihe, Zwischen Himmel und Erde, Max Emanuels Brautfahrt, George Washington, Die Heldin von Yorktown, etc. He was stage manager at Heidelberg 1853-56. He wrote Die Theaterkrisis im neuen deutschen Reich (The theatrical crisis in the new German empire; Stuttgart, 1872), which led to his being appointed director of the court theatre at Karlsruhe the same year.

He lived at Mannheim in 1873, then went to Vienna and Dresden and wrote Meine Erlebnisse als Hoftheaterdirektor (My experiences as director of a court theater; 2d ed., Leipzig, 1874), Berliner Leimruten und deutsche Gimpel (Berlin lime-twigs and German bullfinches; Leipzig, 1875), Brennende Theaterfragen (Burning questions on theater;Vienna, 1877), Der Verfall der deutschen Schaubühne und die Bewältigung der Theaterkalamität (1880), Das Drangsal der deutschen Schaubühne (The afflictions of the German stage; Dresden, 1890). He also wrote the novel Alles um ein Nichts (All for a nothing; 3 vols., Leipzig, 1871). The Archduke of Baden allowed him a pension of 5,000 marks annually.
