= Argental =

- Verwaltungsgemeinschaft
- Location of Argental within Lindau district
- Interactive map of Argental
- Location within Germany Location within Bavaria
- Coordinates: 47°37′N 9°58′E
- Country: Germany
- State: Bavaria
- Admin. region: Swabia
- District: Lindau
- Seat: Röthenbach
- Subdivisions: 4 municipalities

Area
  - Total: 73.29 km^{2} (28.30 sq mi)

Population (2025-12-31)
  - Total: 6,363
  - Density: 86.82/km^{2} (224.9/sq mi)
- Time zone: UTC+01:00 (CET)
  - Summer (DST): UTC+02:00 (CEST)
- Website: www.vg-argental.de

Argental is a Verwaltungsgemeinschaft (municipal association) in the district of Lindau in Bavaria, Germany. Its seat is in Röthenbach. It takes its name from the river Argen.

It consists of the following municipalities:

1. Gestratz
2. Grünenbach
3. Maierhöfen
4. Röthenbach
