= Günter Bentele =

German academic

Günter Bentele (born 24 March 1948 in Heimenkirch) was a professor of Public Relations at the University of Leipzig between 1994 and 2014. Between 1989 and 1994 he taught at the University of Bamberg.
