= Bodolz =

- Municipality
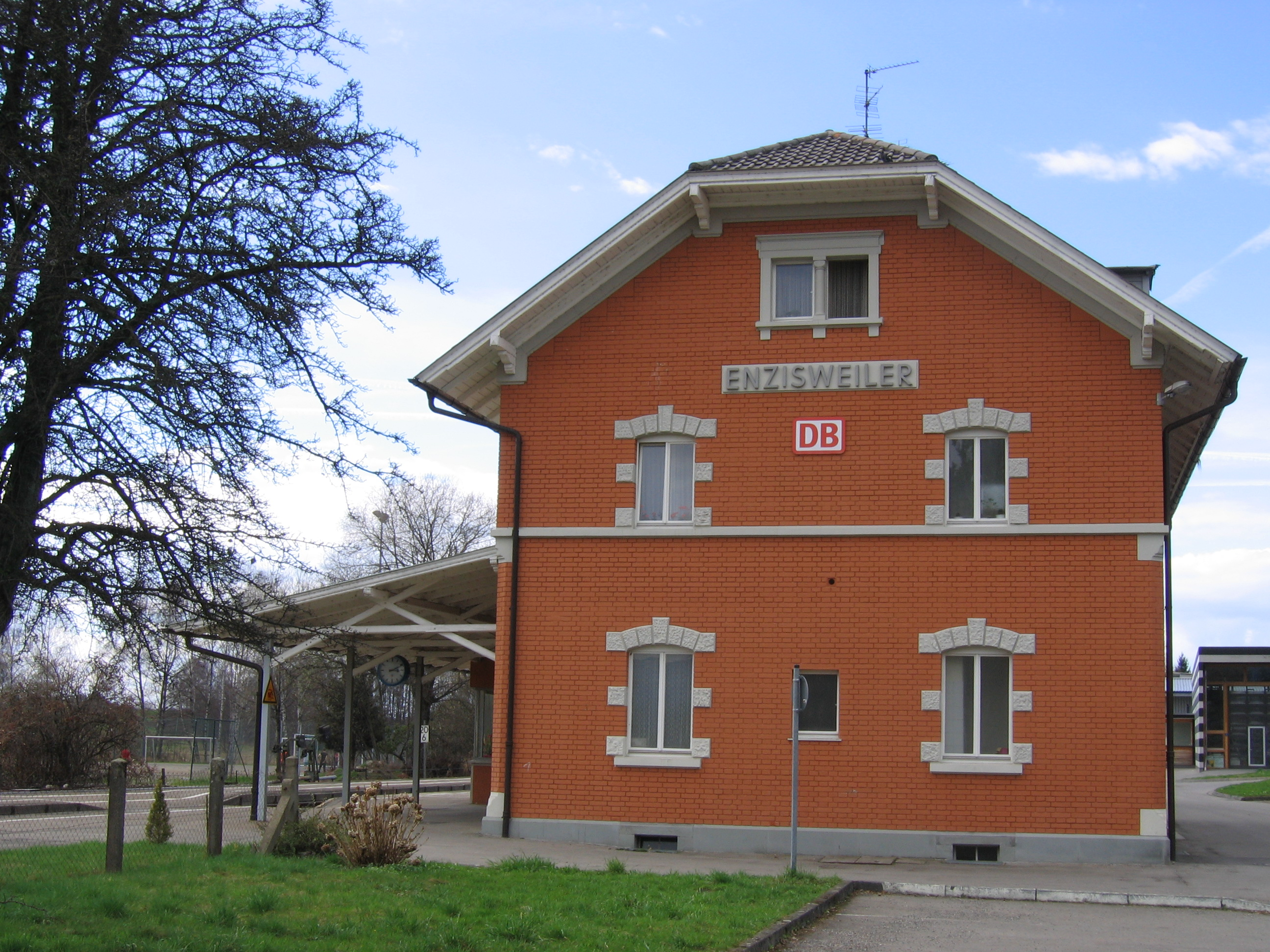
- Bodolz-Enzisweiler train station

- Coat of arms

- Location of Bodolz within Lindau district
- Interactive map of Bodolz
- Location within Germany Location within Bavaria
- Coordinates: 47°34′20″N 9°39′40″E
- Country: Germany
- State: Bavaria
- Admin. region: Schwaben
- District: Lindau

Government
  - Mayor (2022–28): Felix Eisenbach

Area
  - Total: 3.03 km^{2} (1.17 sq mi)
- Elevation: 429 m (1,407 ft)

Population (2025-12-31)
  - Total: 2,918
  - Density: 963/km^{2} (2,490/sq mi)
- Time zone: UTC+01:00 (CET)
  - Summer (DST): UTC+02:00 (CEST)
- Postal codes: 88131
- Dialling codes: 0 83 82
- Vehicle registration: LI
- Website: www.bodolz.de

Bodolz is a municipality in the district of Lindau in Bavaria in Germany.

== Districts ==
The municipality consists of the following towns and districts:

- Bettnau
- Bruggach
- Ebnet
- Enzisweiler
- Hochsträß
- Hoyerberg
- Mittenbuch
- Taubenberg

== History ==
Bodolz was part of the former Fugger authority of Wasserburg and later became part of Austria. Since the signing of the peace treaties of Brünn and Preßburg in 1805, the town belongs to Bavaria. In the course of the administrative reforms in Bavaria the contemporary municipality was formed by the "Gemeindeedikt" of 1818.

== Economy and infrastructure ==
=== Economy, agriculture and forestry ===
According to the official statistics, in 1998 there were twelve employees who were subject to social insurance contribution in the sector of agriculture and forestry, 44 in the industrial sector and 26 in the sector of trade and transport at place of work. In miscellaneous sectors there were 124 persons who were subject to social insurance contribution at place of work. At place of domicile there were 668 employees altogether. In the industrial sector there were ten, in the main construction trade two businesses. Moreover, there were 31 agricultural businesses in 1999 with a total area of 241 ha, of which 6 ha were agricultural crop land and 106 ha green space.

=== Education ===
The elementary school "Schule im Obstgarten", which can be attended for the first four grades, is located in the municipality of Bodolz.

Bodolz has two kindergartens:

- Gemeindekindergarten Bodolz (Im Obstgarten 15, 88131 Bodolz)
- Catholic kindergarten St. Johannes der Täufer (Kirchstr. 13, 88131 Bodolz)
