= Lindau (district) =

Coordinates: 47°35′N 9°45′E

- District
- Flag Coat of arms
- Country: Germany
- State: Bavaria
- Adm. region: Swabia
- Capital: Lindau

Government
  - District admin.: Elmar Stegmann (CSU)

Area
  - Total: 323 km^{2} (125 sq mi)

Population (31 December 2025)
  - Total: 82,399
  - Density: 255/km^{2} (661/sq mi)
- Time zone: UTC+01:00 (CET)
  - Summer (DST): UTC+02:00 (CEST)
- Vehicle registration: LI
- Website: landkreis-lindau.de

Lindau is a Landkreis (district) in Swabia, Bavaria, Germany; its capital is the city of Lindau. It is bounded by (from the east and clockwise) the district of Oberallgäu, Austria (federal state of Vorarlberg), Lake Constance and the state of Baden-Württemberg (districts of Bodensee and Ravensburg).

== History ==
The city of Lindau became a Free Imperial City in the 13th century; it was directly subordinate to the emperor. The rural areas around Lindau were the property of monasteries or tiny counties, that rose and fell in the region. When Napoleon gained influence in the area, all these entities were dissolved in the German Mediatisation and Lindau fell to Bavaria.

The district of Lindau was established in 1938. After the Second World War it became — like the Rhenish Palatinate — part of the French zone of occupation to create a land bridge between the French zones in Germany and Austria, while the rest of Bavaria was under American occupation. The district was administered jointly with Württemberg-Hohenzollern, but belonged neither to Bavaria or Württemberg and had a special territorial position. Throughout its special status, the district was administered by Bregenz native Anton Zwisler (1888-1977).

The district was represented by three delegates in the Advisory State Assembly (Beratende Landesversammlung) and later Landtag of Württemberg-Hohenzollern. On September 25, 1948, the city of Lindau was spun off from the district and became a district-free city.

Lindau earned a lot of pet names during the period, namely "Second Principality of Liechtenstein" (Zweites Fürstentum Liechtenstein), "Paradise" (Paradies), "Germany's Grease Spot" (Deutschlands Fettfleck) and "Monte Carlo on Lake Constance" (Monte Carlo am Bodensee). The latter name came from the casino, which opened in Lindau in 1950, the others were used to refer to Lindau's self-sufficiency, as the district was allowed to keep all taxes and custom duties for itself. Also, while in some other parts of Germany, people suffered from hunger, Lindau had a surplus of fruit, milk and meat for export and a brisk construction activity.

With the signing of the Austrian State Treaty restoring Austrian independence and the withdrawal of Allied forces, Lindau's bridging function for France, and thus the need for special position, became obsolete, so on September 1, 1955 the district was reincorporated into Bavaria, with a negotiated transition period until March 27, 1956, when a ceremony was held at Lindau's Old Town Hall attended by Zwisler and then-Bavarian Minister-President Wilhelm Hoegner. The city of Lindau, which had been an urban district, became a part of the rural district in 1972.

== Geography ==
In the southwest the district borders Lake Constance, more precisely its eastern part known as Obersee. To the north the countryside rises to the hills of the western Allgäu mountains.

== Coat of arms ==
The coat of arms displays:

- the blue and white checked pattern of Bavaria
- a lime tree symbolising the city of Lindau ("lime tree" is Linde in German)
- the arms of the counts of Montfort
- a blue wavy line symbolising Lake Constance

== Towns and municipalities ==
Clickable map of towns and municipalities in the district

Towns
1. Lindau
2. Lindenberg im Allgäu
Märkte
1. Heimenkirch
2. Scheidegg
3. Weiler-Simmerberg
Municipalities
1. Bodolz
2. Hergatz
3. Nonnenhorn
4. Opfenbach
5. Wasserburg am Bodensee

Verwaltungsgemeinschaften
1. Argental; 1. Gestratz; 2. Grünenbach; 3. Maierhöfen; 4. Röthenbach^{1}	2. Sigmarszell; 1. Hergensweiler; 2. Sigmarszell^{1}; 3. Weißensberg	3. Stiefenhofen; 1. Oberreute; 2. Stiefenhofen^{1}
^{1}seat of the Verwaltungsgemeinschaft
