= Heimenkirch =

- Municipality
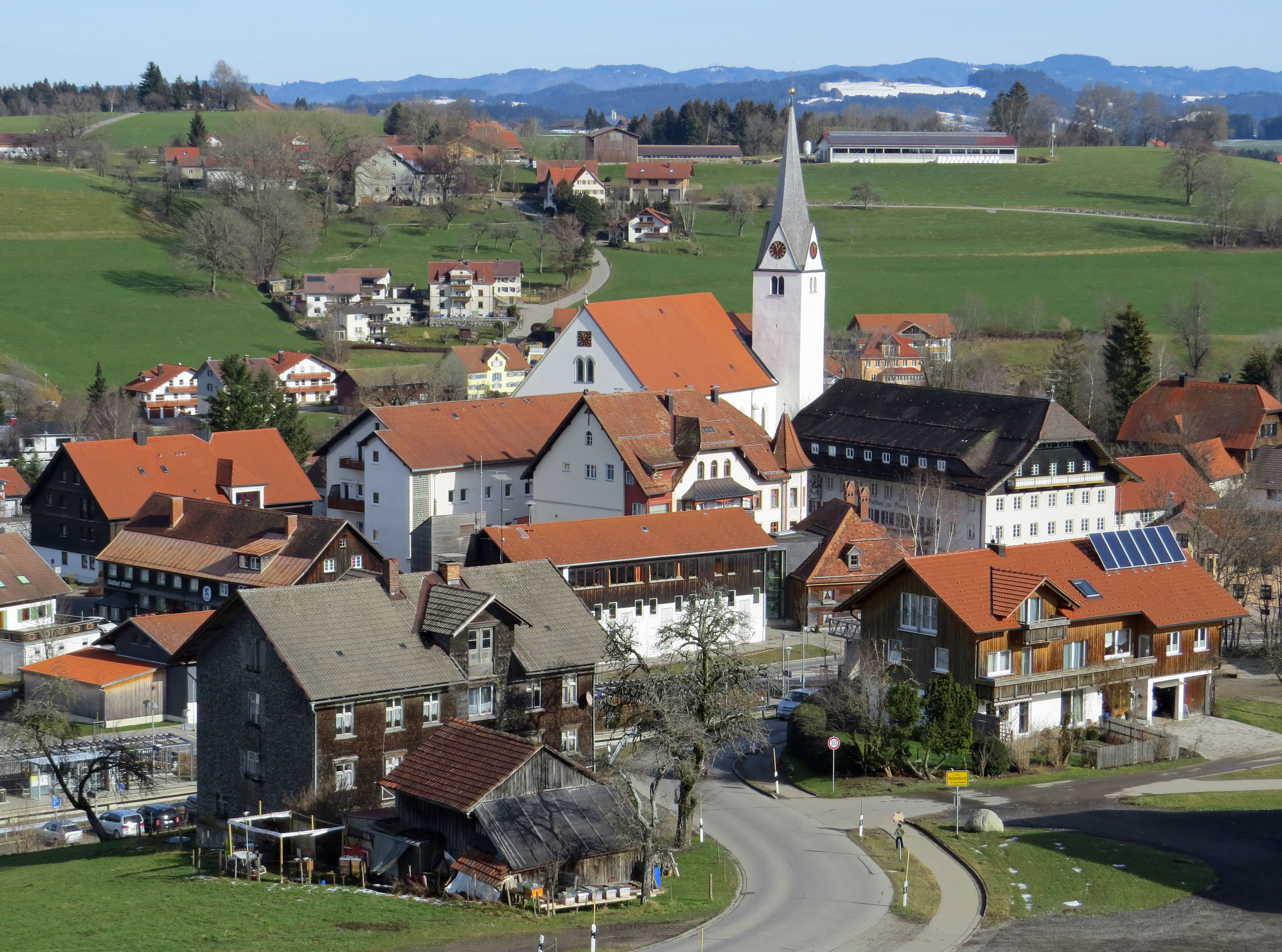
- Heimenkirch seen from the southwest

- Coat of arms

- Location of Heimenkirch within Lindau district
- Interactive map of Heimenkirch
- Location within Germany Location within Bavaria
- Coordinates: 47°37′N 9°55′E
- Country: Germany
- State: Bavaria
- Admin. region: Schwaben
- District: Lindau

Government
  - Mayor (2020–26): Markus Reichart (Greens)

Area
  - Total: 21.23 km^{2} (8.20 sq mi)
- Elevation: 668 m (2,192 ft)

Population (2025-12-31)
  - Total: 3,488
  - Density: 164.3/km^{2} (425.5/sq mi)
- Time zone: UTC+01:00 (CET)
  - Summer (DST): UTC+02:00 (CEST)
- Postal codes: 88178
- Dialling codes: 08381
- Vehicle registration: LI
- Website: www.heimenkirch.de

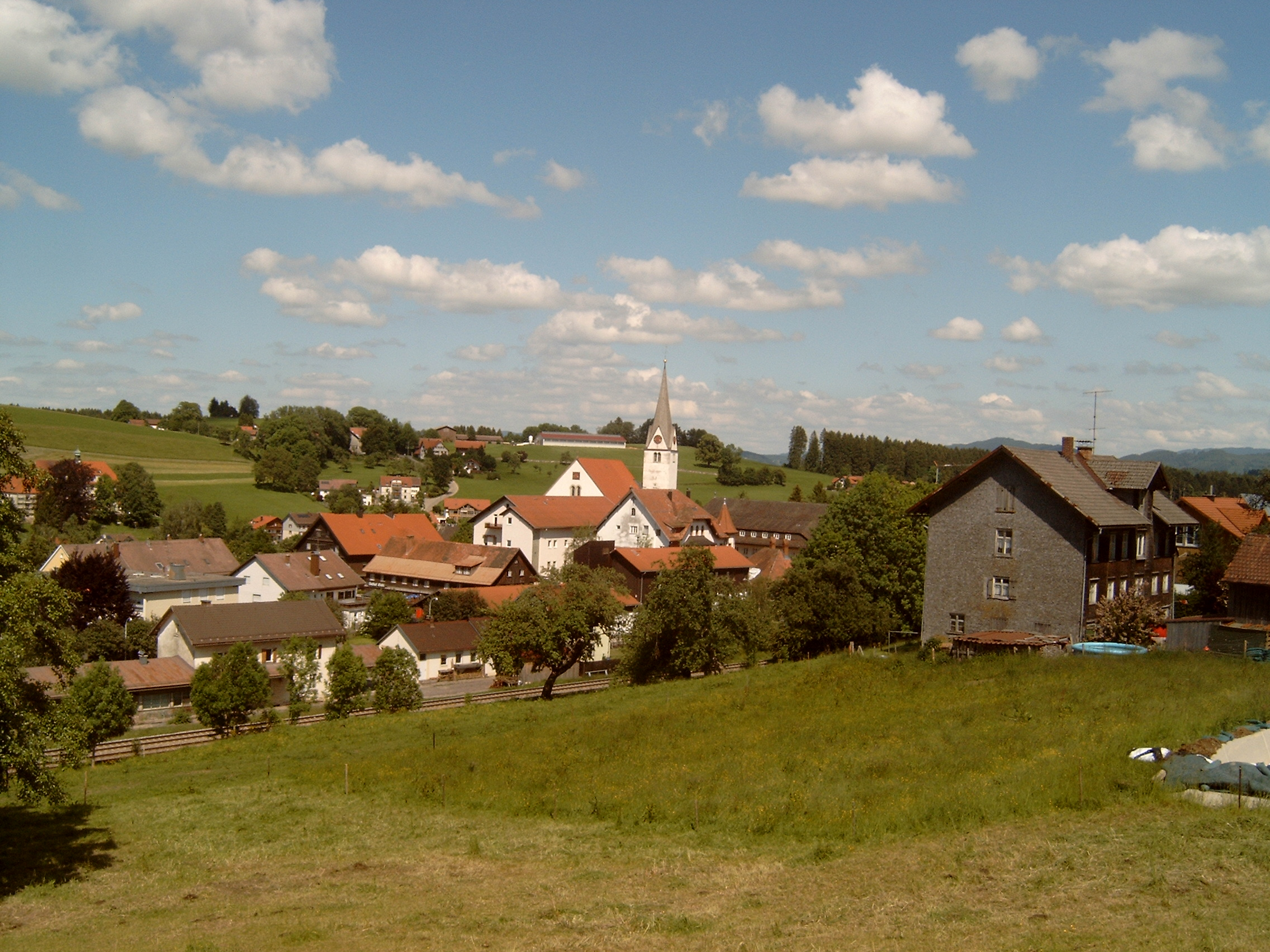
Heimenkirch

Heimenkirch is a municipality in the district of Lindau in Bavaria in Germany.

== Geography ==
Heimenkirch is located in the Allgäu region. It consists of the subdivisions of Aspach, Berg, Biesenberg, Dreiheiligen, Engenberg, Geigersthal, Hofs, Kappen, Mapprechts, Meckatz, Menzen, Mothen, Oberhäuser, Ober- und Unterried, Riedhirsch, Syrgenstein, Wolfertshofen, and Zwiesele. In some districts Heimenkirch has the same area code (07566) as Leutkirch, which is 36 kilometres (22 miles) away.

== History ==
Heimenkirch owes its name to a Germanic sovereign called Heimo. Before becoming part of Bavaria, Heimenkirch belonged to Austria. At that time it was part of the Austrian authority of Bregenz-Hohenegg. Since the signing of the peace treaties of Brünn and Preßburg in 1805, the town has belonged to Bavaria. During the administrative reforms in Bavaria the contemporary municipality was formed by the "Gemeindeedikt" of 1818.

=== Population development ===
Heimenkirch had 2,845 residents in 1970, 3,093 in 1987, and 3,586 in 2000.

== Politics ==
The mayor of Heimenkirch is Markus Reichart (Greens). His deputies are Albert Lau and Angela Fessler.

Seating in the municipal council:

- CSU: 7 seats
- FW: 7 seats
- SPD: 1 seats
- Grüne: 1 seat

The revenue from the municipal tax added up to 3,345,000 € in 1999, of which the net business tax amounted to 1,761,000 €.

=== Sister town ===
- Balassagyarmat, Hungary

== Economy and infrastructure ==
=== Economy, agriculture and forestry ===
According to the official statistics, in 1998 there were seven employees who were subject to social insurance contribution in the sector of agriculture and forestry, 1,456 in the industrial sector and 31 in the sector of trade and transport at place of work. In miscellaneous sectors there were 131 people employed at place of work. At place of domicile there were 1,328 employees altogether. In the industrial sector there were two, in the main construction trade eight businesses. Moreover, there were 80 agricultural businesses in 1999 with a total area of 1,428 ha.

=== Resident businesses ===
- Hochland SE: cheese dairy
- Meckatzer Löwenbräu: brewery in the district of Meckatz
- Holdenried Reisen: travel business, which is active nationwide, especially for cruises

=== Transportation ===
Heimenkirch has a train station, which reopened in 2010.

== Notable people ==
- Günter Bentele, professor of public relations
