= Weiler-Simmerberg =

- Municipality
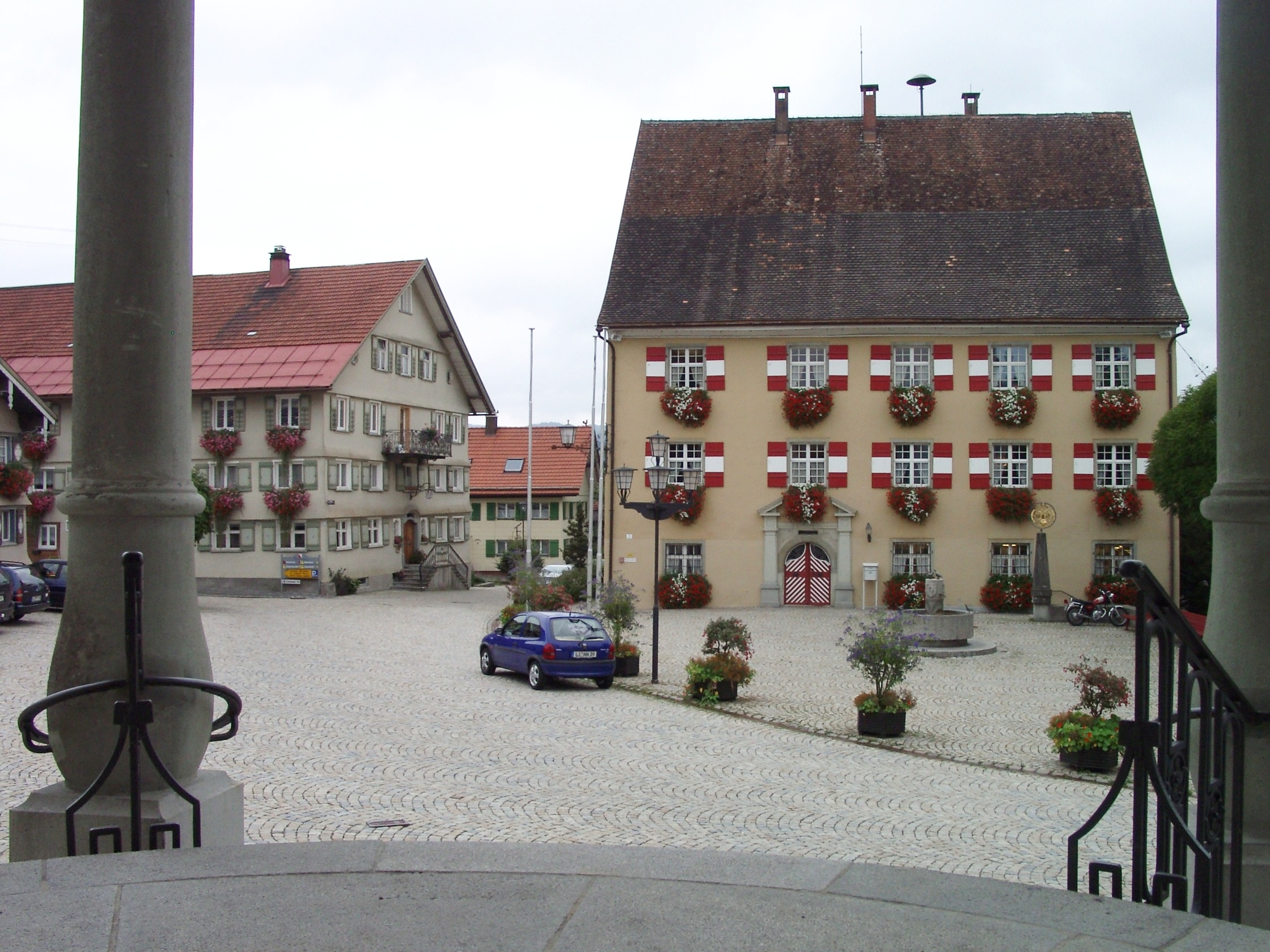
- Weiler-Simmerberg Town Hall

- Coat of arms

- Location of Weiler-Simmerberg within Lindau district
- Interactive map of Weiler-Simmerberg
- Location within Germany Location within Bavaria
- Coordinates: 47°35′N 9°56′E
- Country: Germany
- State: Bavaria
- Admin. region: Schwaben
- District: Lindau

Government
  - Mayor (2020–26): Tobias Paintner

Area
  - Total: 31.30 km^{2} (12.08 sq mi)
- Elevation: 630–900 m (2,070–2,950 ft)

Population (2025-12-31)
  - Total: 6,327
  - Density: 202.1/km^{2} (523.5/sq mi)
- Time zone: UTC+01:00 (CET)
  - Summer (DST): UTC+02:00 (CEST)
- Postal codes: 88171
- Dialling codes: 08387 (Weiler-Simmerberg) 08384 (Ellhofen)
- Vehicle registration: LI

Weiler-Simmerberg is a market town in the Swabian Lindau district.

== Geography ==
Being located in the Westallgäu, the market town is bordering on the region of the Bregenz Forest, part of the Austrian administrative region of Vorarlberg. The Hausbachklamm belongs to the prominent landmarks and sights of Weiler-Simmerberg, as well as the Enschenstein and the Wildrosenmoos. Even though the landscape is rather mild, there are many very cliffy and steep rock faces due to the irregular bedding of sandstone and conglomerate.

=== Parts of the municipality ===
The area of Weiler-Simmerberg consists of the "Gemarkungen" Ellhofen, Simmerberg and Weiler im Allgäu.

The following districts belong to the market town of Weiler-Simmerberg:

- Buchenbühl
- Dressen
- Ellhofen
- Hagelstein
- Hasenried
- Oberleute
- Obertrogen
- Rieder
- Riegen
- Rothach
- Ruppenmanklitz
- Schreckenmanklitz
- Simmerberg
- Untertrogen
- Weiler im Allgäu
- Weißen

== History ==
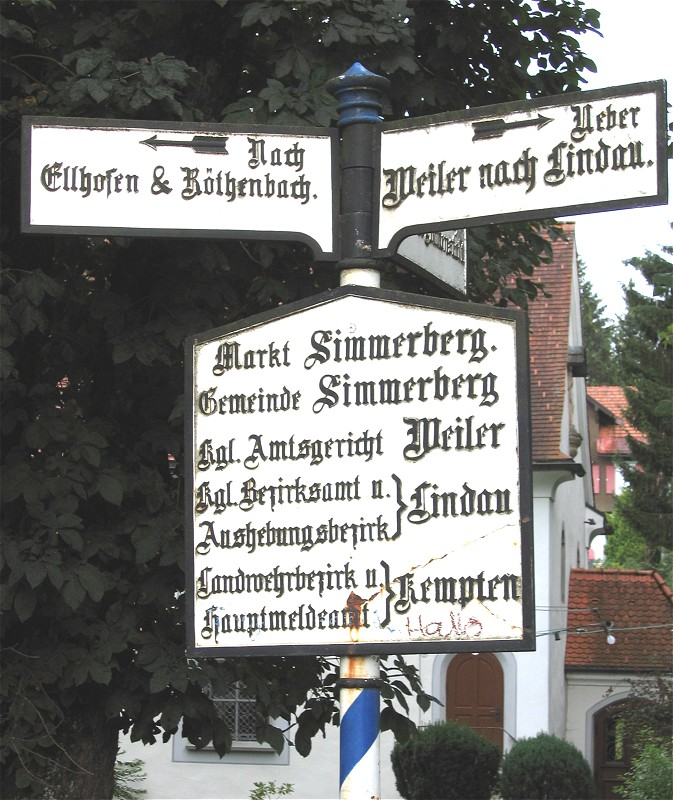
Historic town sign in Simmerberg

The municipality celebrated the 1111th anniversary of its first mentioning in 2005. The market town of Weiler-Simmerberg had been seat of a higher and lower court before 1805 and belonged to the Austrian authority of Bregenz-Hohenegg. Since the signing of the peace treaties of Brünn und Preßburg in 1805, the town belongs to Bavaria. In the course of the administrative reforms in Bavaria, the contemporary municipality was formed by the "Gemeindeedikt" of 1818.

== Twin towns ==
Weiler-Simmerberg is twinned with:

- Sona in Italy
- Valmontone in Italy
- Ollioules in France
- Benifaió in Spain (since 1987)
