= Grünenbach =

- Municipality
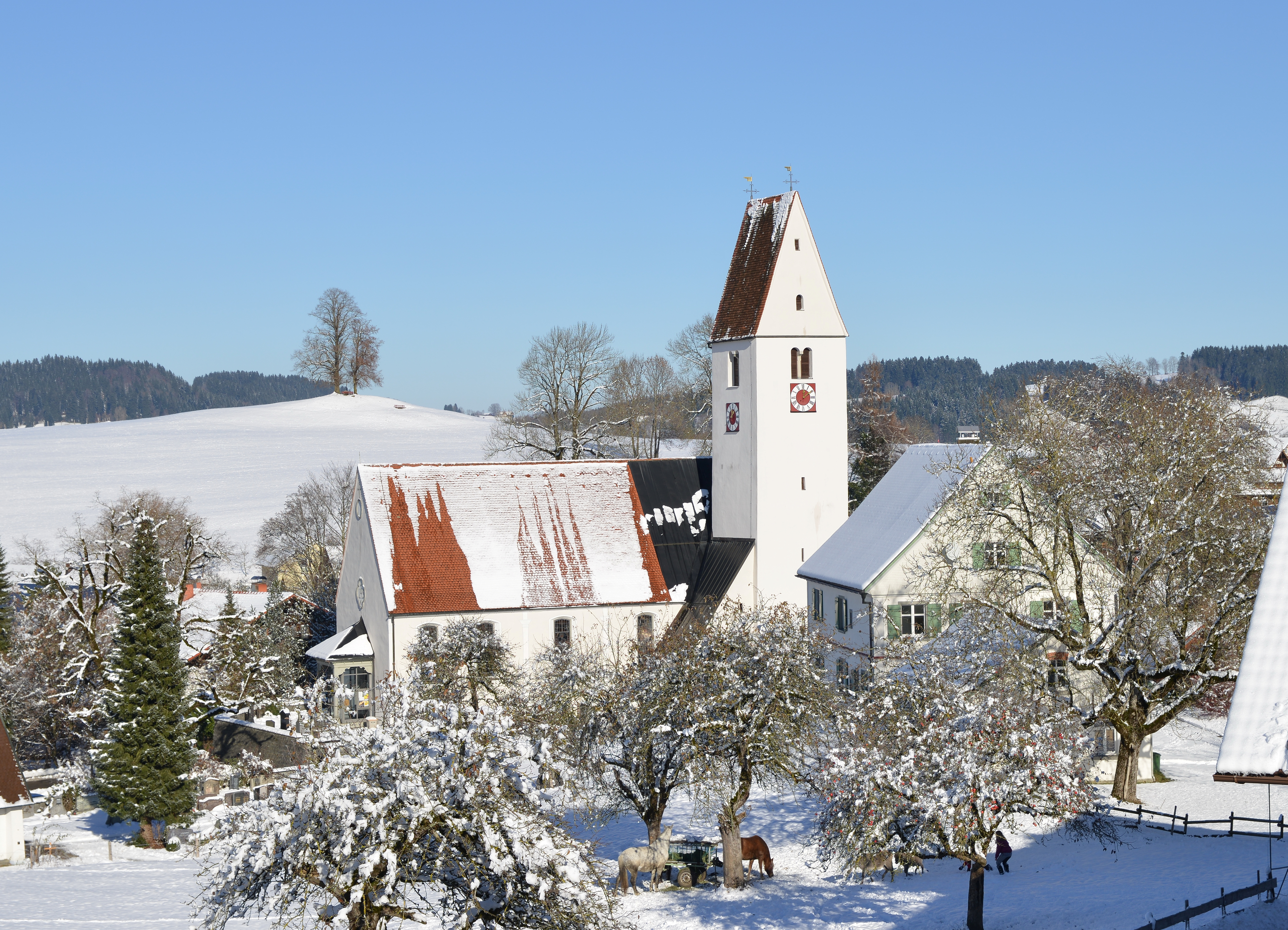
- Church of Saint Otmar

- Coat of arms

- Location of Grünenbach within Lindau district
- Interactive map of Grünenbach
- Location within Germany Location within Bavaria
- Coordinates: 47°37′N 10°1′E
- Country: Germany
- State: Bavaria
- Admin. region: Schwaben
- District: Lindau
- Municipal assoc.: Argental

Government
  - Mayor (2020–26): Markus Eugler

Area
  - Total: 25.12 km^{2} (9.70 sq mi)
- Elevation: 718 m (2,356 ft)

Population (2025-12-31)
  - Total: 1,571
  - Density: 62.54/km^{2} (162.0/sq mi)
- Time zone: UTC+01:00 (CET)
  - Summer (DST): UTC+02:00 (CEST)
- Postal codes: 88167
- Dialling codes: 08383
- Vehicle registration: LI
- Website: www.gruenenbach.de

Grünenbach is a municipality in the district of Lindau in Bavaria in Germany.

== Geography ==
Grünenbach is located in the Allgäu region.

It consists of the following districts: Ebratshofen, Grünenbach.

== History ==
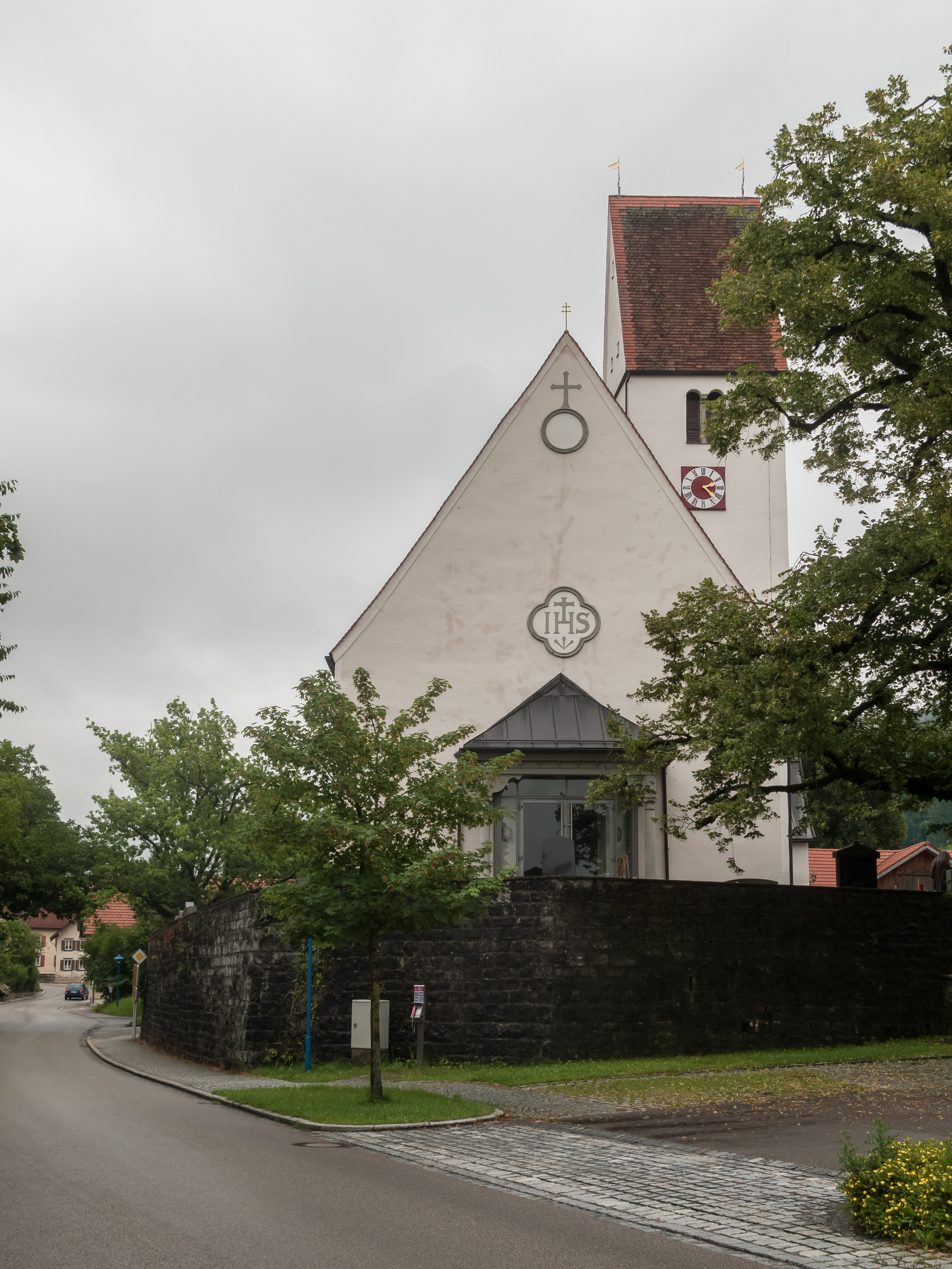
Church of Saint Otmar

Before 1800 Grünenbach had been seat of a higher and lower court and belonged to Austria as a part of the Bregenz-Hohenegg authority, before becoming part of Bavaria. Since the signing of the peace treaties of Brünn and Preßburg in 1805 the town belongs to Bavaria. In the course of the administrative reforms in Bavaria the contemporary municipality was formed by the "Gemeindeedikt" of 1818.

== Demographics ==
In 1970 there were 1,140, in 1987 1,124 and in 2000 1,285 inhabitants living in Grünenbach.

== Politics ==
The mayor of the town is Markus Eugler (Unabhängige Gemeinderäte).

The revenue from the municipal tax added up to €658,000 in 1999, of which the net business tax amounted to €206,000 .

== Economy and infrastructure ==
=== Economy, agriculture and forestry ===
According to the official statistics, in 1998 there were 160 employees who were subject to social insurance contribution in the industrial sector and none in the sector of trade and transport at place of work. In miscellaneous sectors there were 96 persons who were subject to social insurance contribution at place of work. At place of domicile there were 396 employees altogether. In the industrial sector there were two, in the main construction trade four businesses. Moreover, there were 67 agricultural businesses in 1999 with a total area of 1,415 ha.

=== Education ===
In 2005 there were the following institutions:

- Kindergartens: 42 kindergarten spaces with 43 children
- Elementary school: Laubenbergschule Grünenbach
