= Gestratz =

- Municipality
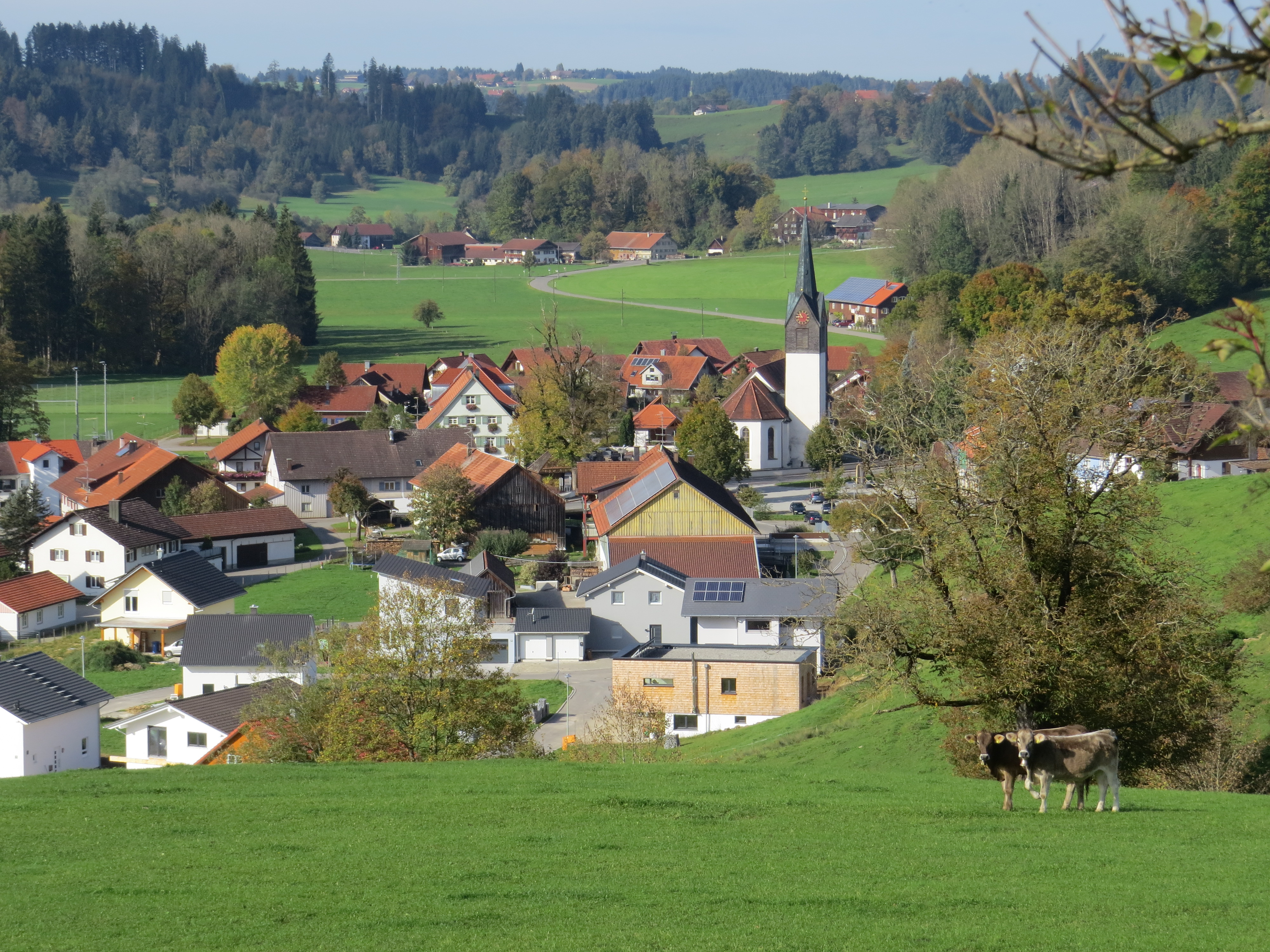
- Gestratz seen from the east

- Coat of arms

- Location of Gestratz within Lindau district
- Interactive map of Gestratz
- Location within Germany Location within Bavaria
- Coordinates: 47°39′N 9°59′E
- Country: Germany
- State: Bavaria
- Admin. region: Schwaben
- District: Lindau
- Municipal assoc.: Argental

Government
  - Mayor (2020–26): Engelbert Fink (FW)

Area
  - Total: 15.07 km^{2} (5.82 sq mi)
- Elevation: 629 m (2,064 ft)

Population (2025-12-31)
  - Total: 1,334
  - Density: 88.52/km^{2} (229.3/sq mi)
- Time zone: UTC+01:00 (CET)
  - Summer (DST): UTC+02:00 (CEST)
- Postal codes: 88167
- Dialling codes: 08384
- Vehicle registration: LI
- Website: www.gestratz.de

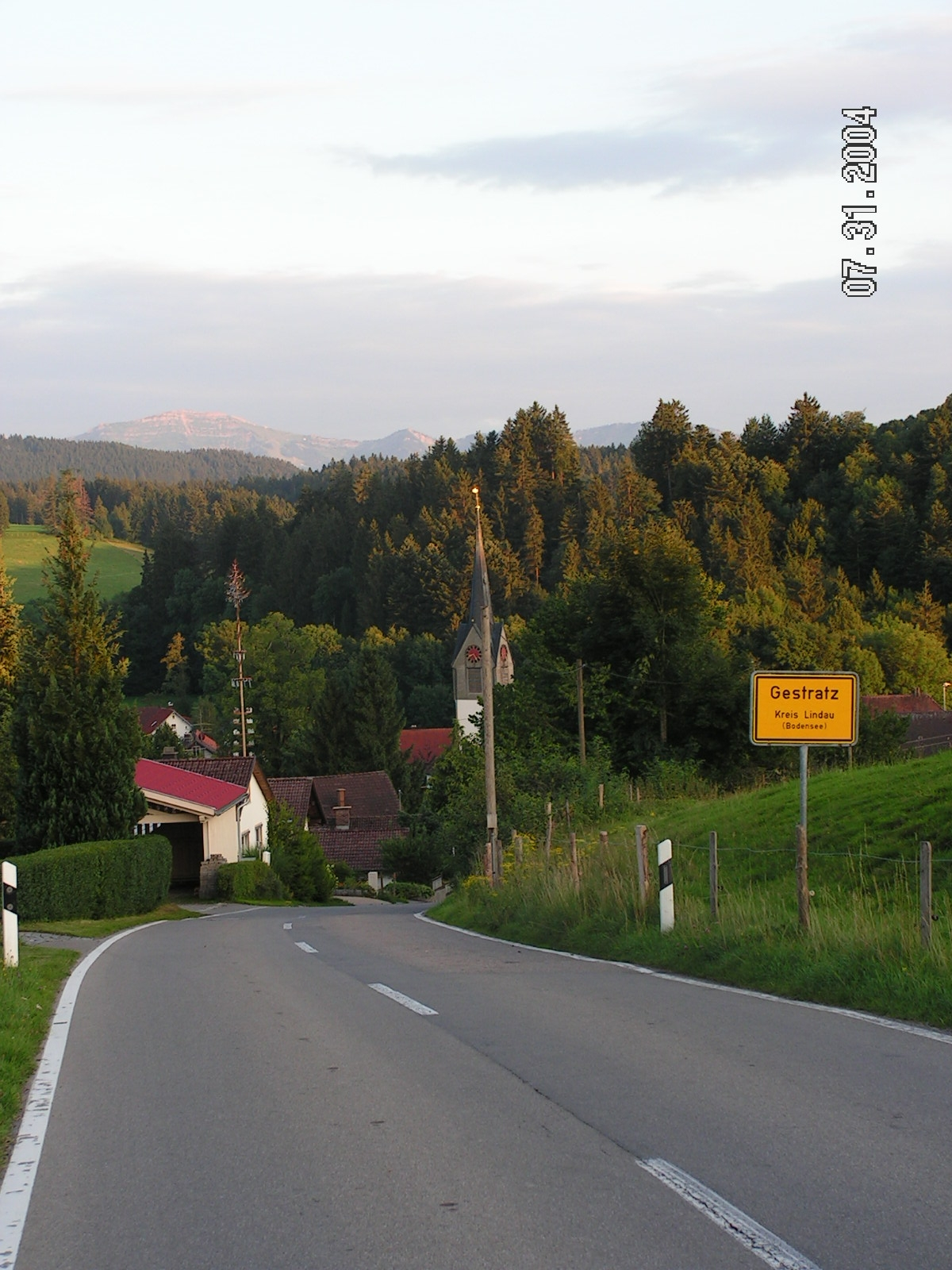
Village boundary at the road An der Reuthe

Gestratz is a municipality in the district of Lindau in Bavaria in Germany.

== Geography ==
Gestratz is located in the Allgäu region. Smaller hamlets like Brugg, Thalendorf, Altensberg, Horben, Kenners, Zwirkenberg, Altenburg, Rutzen, Rauen, Ried, Schweineburg, Ackers and Erhafts also belong to Gestratz.

== History ==
Before becoming part of Bavaria, Gestratz belonged to Austria. In that time it was part of the Austrian authority of Bregenz-Hohenegg. Since the signing of the peace treaties of Brünn and Preßburg in 1805, the town belongs to Bavaria. In the course of the administrative reforms in Bavaria the contemporary municipality was formed by the "Gemeindeedikt" of 1818.

=== Population development ===
In 1970 1,043, in 1987 1,028 and in 2000 1,160 inhabitants were living in the municipality of Gestratz.

== Politics ==
The mayor of Gestratz is Engelbert Fink, elected in March 2020.

The revenue from the municipal tax added up to 441,000 € in 1999, of which the net business tax amounted to 72,000 €.

== Economy and infrastructure ==
=== Economy, agriculture and forestry ===
According to the official statistics, in 1998 there were neither employees who were subject to social insurance contribution in the industrial sector, nor in the sector of trade and transport at place of work. At place of domicile there were 668 employees altogether. In the industrial sector there were nine, in the main construction trade eight businesses. Moreover, there were 64 agricultural businesses in 1999 with a total area of 1,072 ha.

=== Education ===
In 1999 there were the following institutions:

- Kindergartens: 50 kindergarten places and 48 children
- An elementary school with nine teachers and 210 students

== Notable people ==
- Anna Maria Wehinger (born 2 June 1853, daughter of Augustin Kirchmann „Bei Franzebube im Ried“; died 4 May 1922 in Dornbirn). Wehinger was in charge of one of the first domestic science schools in the German-speaking area (since 1889) and published the legendary "Dornbirner Kochbuch". During the 25 years she was working in Dornbirn, she provided 82 courses of several weeks and 70 evening courses. In 1924, two years after her death, the last issue of the "Dornbirner Kochbuch", which already contained about 1000 recipes, was published by her son. Her cookery and cookbooks still have more than just a historical value. The recipes are not only contemporary witnesses of the life of the time of the turn of the century, but also mostly delicious recipes for the modern cooking. A reissue was released in 2007.
- Michael Kitzelmann (born 1916 in the Horben district; executed 11 June 1942 by an execution commando in Russia), member of the resistance against the Nazi regime.
