= Stiefenhofen =

- Municipality
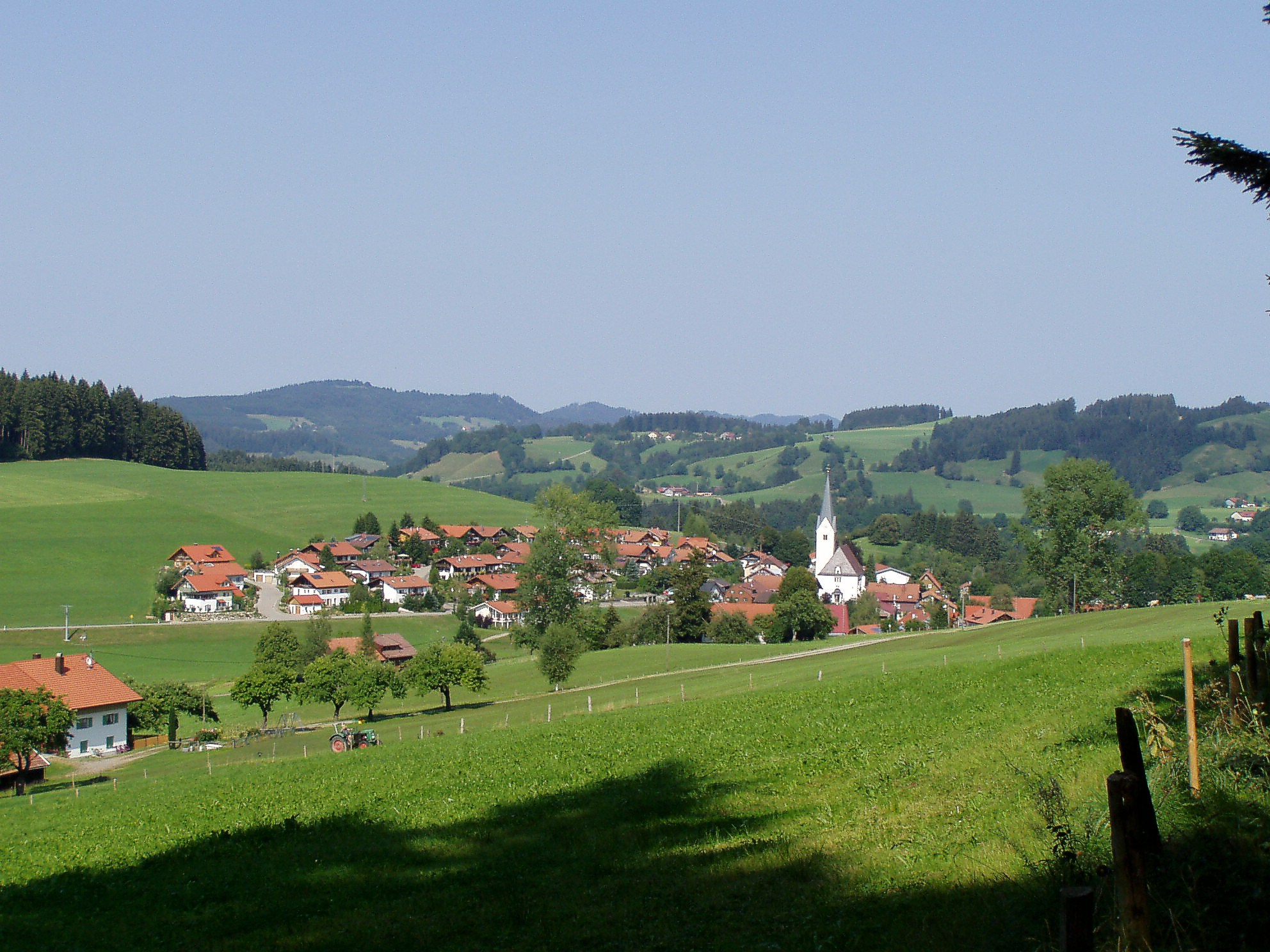
- Stiefenhofen seen from the southwest

- Coat of arms

- Location of Stiefenhofen within Lindau district
- Interactive map of Stiefenhofen
- Location within Germany Location within Bavaria
- Coordinates: 47°36′N 10°0′E
- Country: Germany
- State: Bavaria
- Admin. region: Schwaben
- District: Lindau
- Municipal assoc.: Stiefenhofen

Government
  - Mayor (2020–26): Christian Hauber

Area
  - Total: 28.96 km^{2} (11.18 sq mi)
- Elevation: 805 m (2,641 ft)

Population (2025-12-31)
  - Total: 1,878
  - Density: 64.85/km^{2} (168.0/sq mi)
- Time zone: UTC+01:00 (CET)
  - Summer (DST): UTC+02:00 (CEST)
- Postal codes: 88167
- Dialling codes: 08383
- Vehicle registration: LI
- Website: www.stiefenhofen.de

Stiefenhofen is a municipality in the district of Lindau in Bavaria in Germany and the seat of the administrative community of Stiefenhofen.

== Geography ==
=== Location ===
Stiefenhofen is located in the region of Allgäu, more precisely in the Westallgäu, near Lake Constance. The lowest point of the area is 750 m, the highest point is 1067 m.

=== Population ===
Year	Population
1961	1589
1970	1557
1987	1498
1991	1628
1995	1612
2000	1665
2005	1719
2010	1788
2015	1842

== Politics ==
=== Mayor ===
The mayor has been Anton Wolf (CSU / free voters) from 1990 until 2020. He was re-elected in 1996, 2002, 2008 and 2014. In March 2020 Christian Hauber was elected mayor.

=== Town Council ===
After the 2014 election, the municipal council has 12 members.

=== Coat of arms ===
The coat of arms of the municipality of Stiefenhofen, which was assigned in 1973, is diagonally divided from silver and blue. It shows an oblique black stepped bar, below a golden bird (crossbill).

== Economy ==
=== Economy including agriculture and forestry ===
According to official statistics, there were 89 employees subject to social insurance in the manufacturing sector in 1998. In other economic areas, 80 persons were required to work under social insurance at the place of work. In total there were 562 employees subject to social insurance. In the manufacturing sector, there were five farms and eight in the construction industry. In addition, there were 110 agricultural holdings in 1999, with 1966 hectares of cultivated green space. In 2017, the municipality reported 105 farms.

=== Education ===
Facilities (as of 1999):

- Kindergarten: 50 kindergartens with 49 children
- Primary school: one with four teachers and 87 pupils

=== Tourism ===
Monuments in Stiefenhofen

== Gallery ==
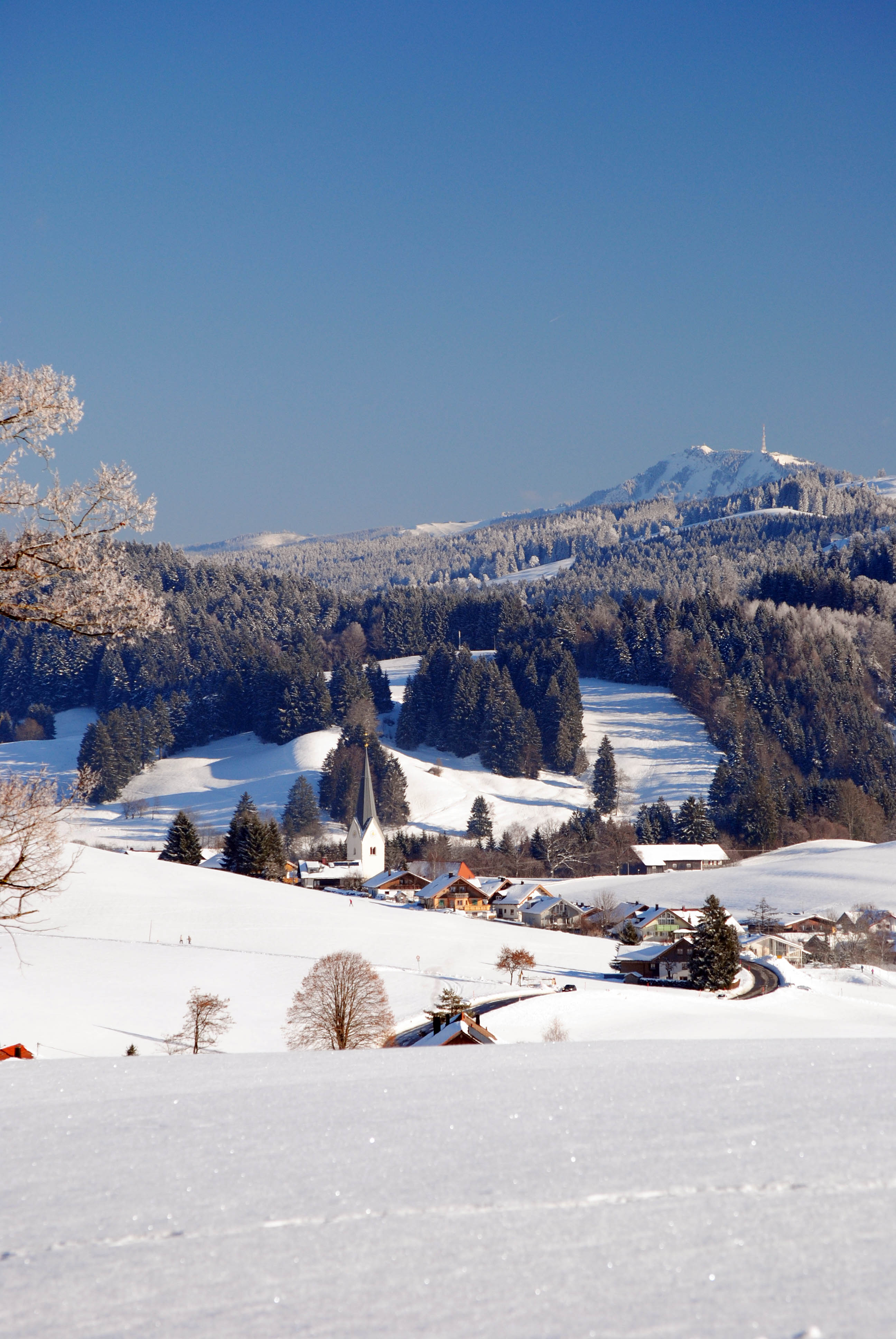
Stiefenhofen with the mountain Grünten in Background

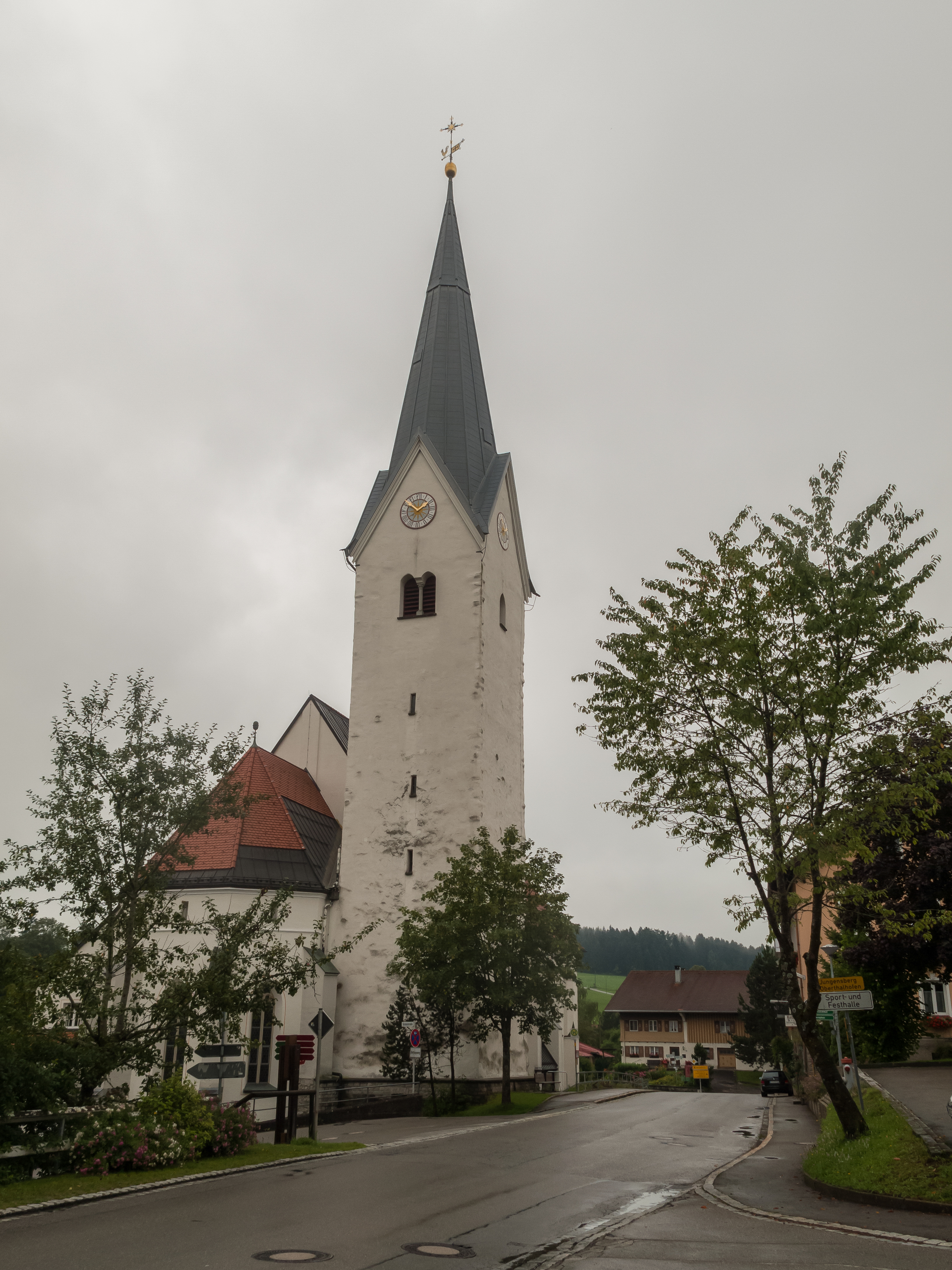
Catholic church of St. Martin

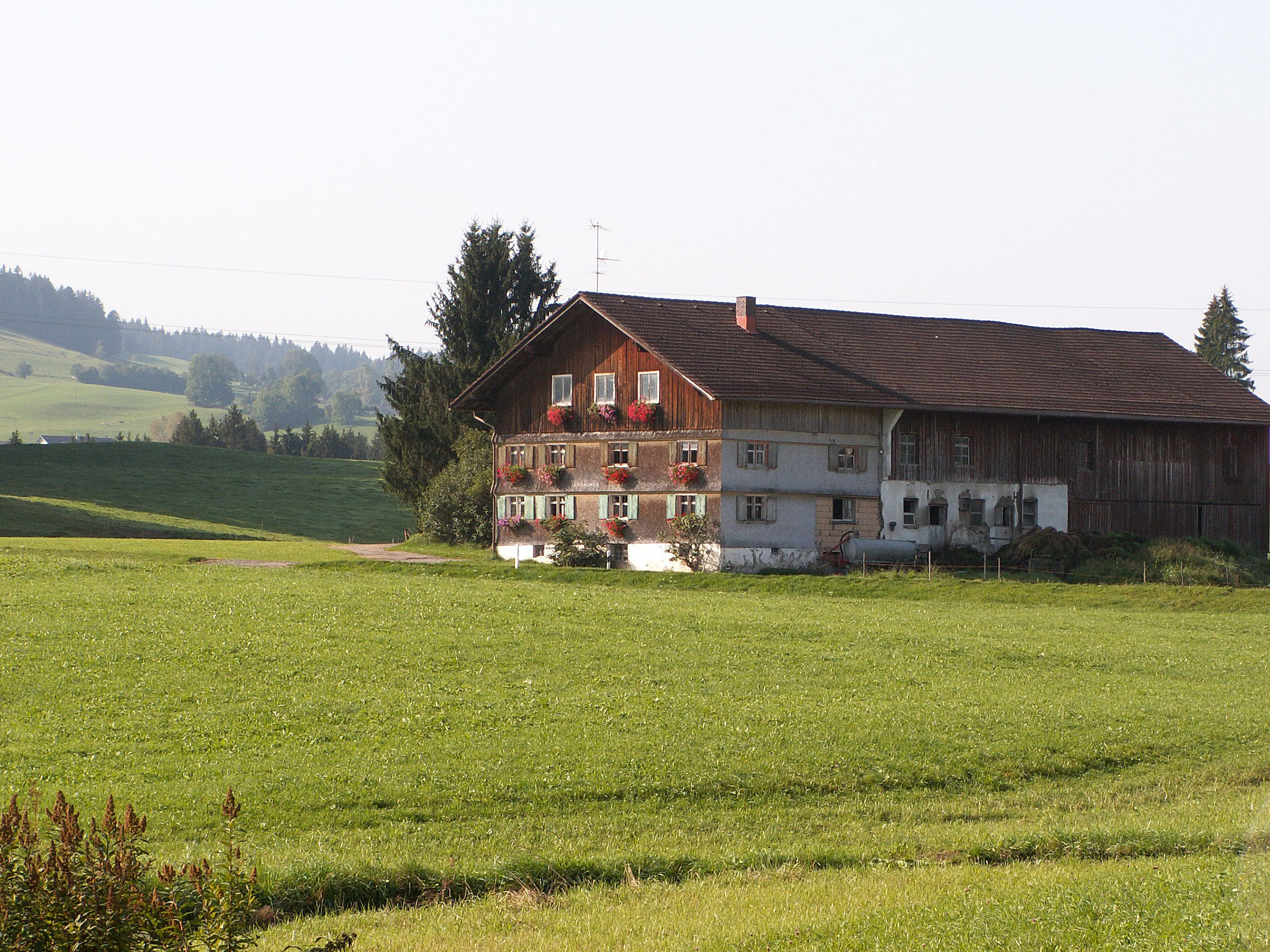
Wolfsried, Stiefenhofen

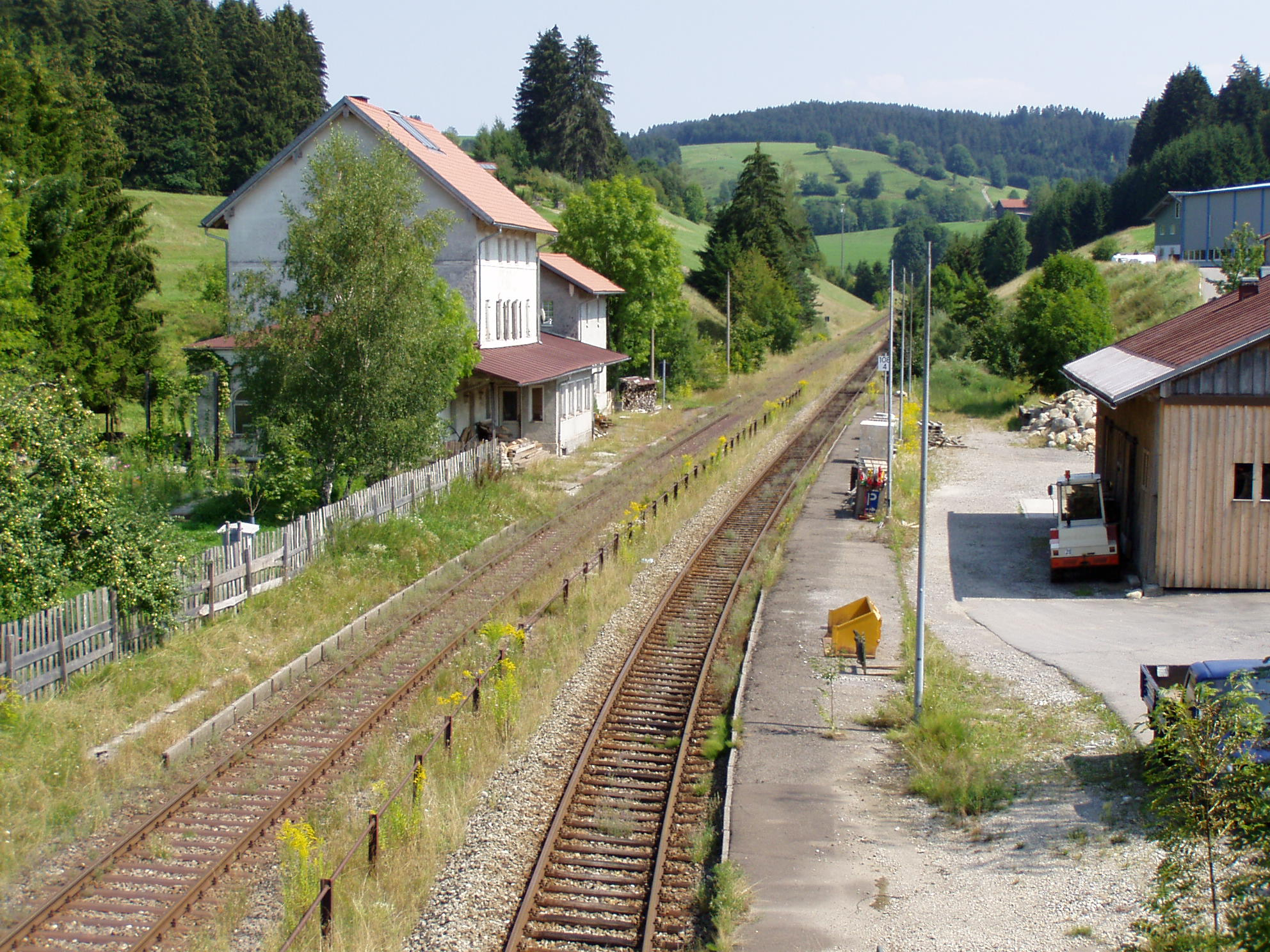
Train Station

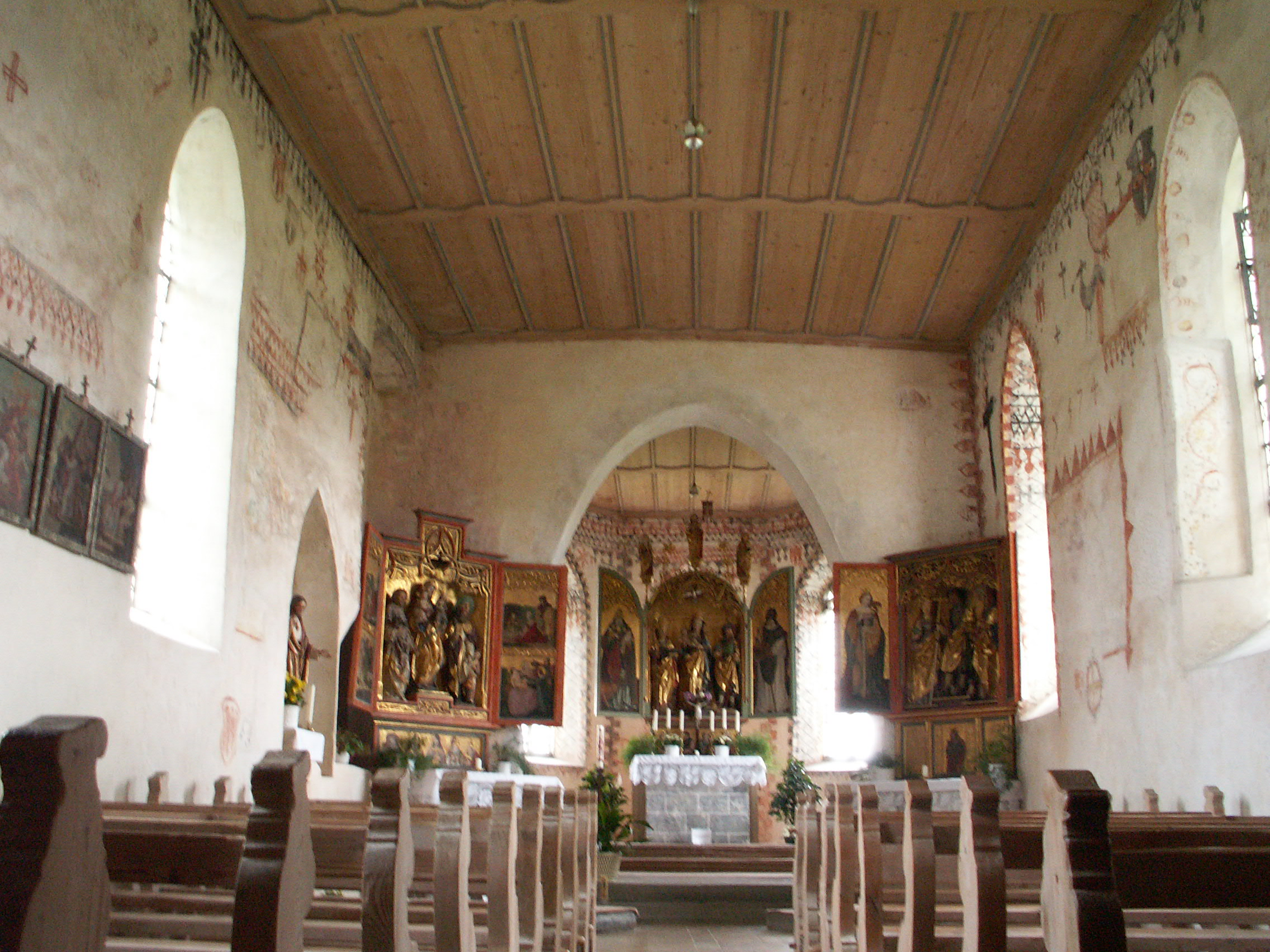
Chapel in Genhofen, Stiefenhofen
