= René Giessen =

German composer (born 1944)

René Giessen (born 24 December 1944, Prague) is a German musician, composer and conductor.

Giessen is widely known for playing the harmonica in various cover-versions of the title melody of famous German Winnetou-movies from the 1960s starring Pierre Brice and Lex Barker. This melody was composed by German composer Martin Böttcher and originally was played by Johnny Müller. At the time the original themes from the Karl May movies were published they held top positions in the German charts and can be considered a landmark in German film music history. The success of these movies originated a whole new genre later known as the "Spaghetti Westerns" where once again the harmonica plays a dominant role (there is even a character by the name of Harmonica in Sergio Leone's movie Once Upon a Time in the West) in the music of Ennio Morricone, played on the harmonica by Franco De Gemini.

== External pages ==
- Rene Giessen Homepage
