= Röthenbach (Allgäu) =

- Municipality
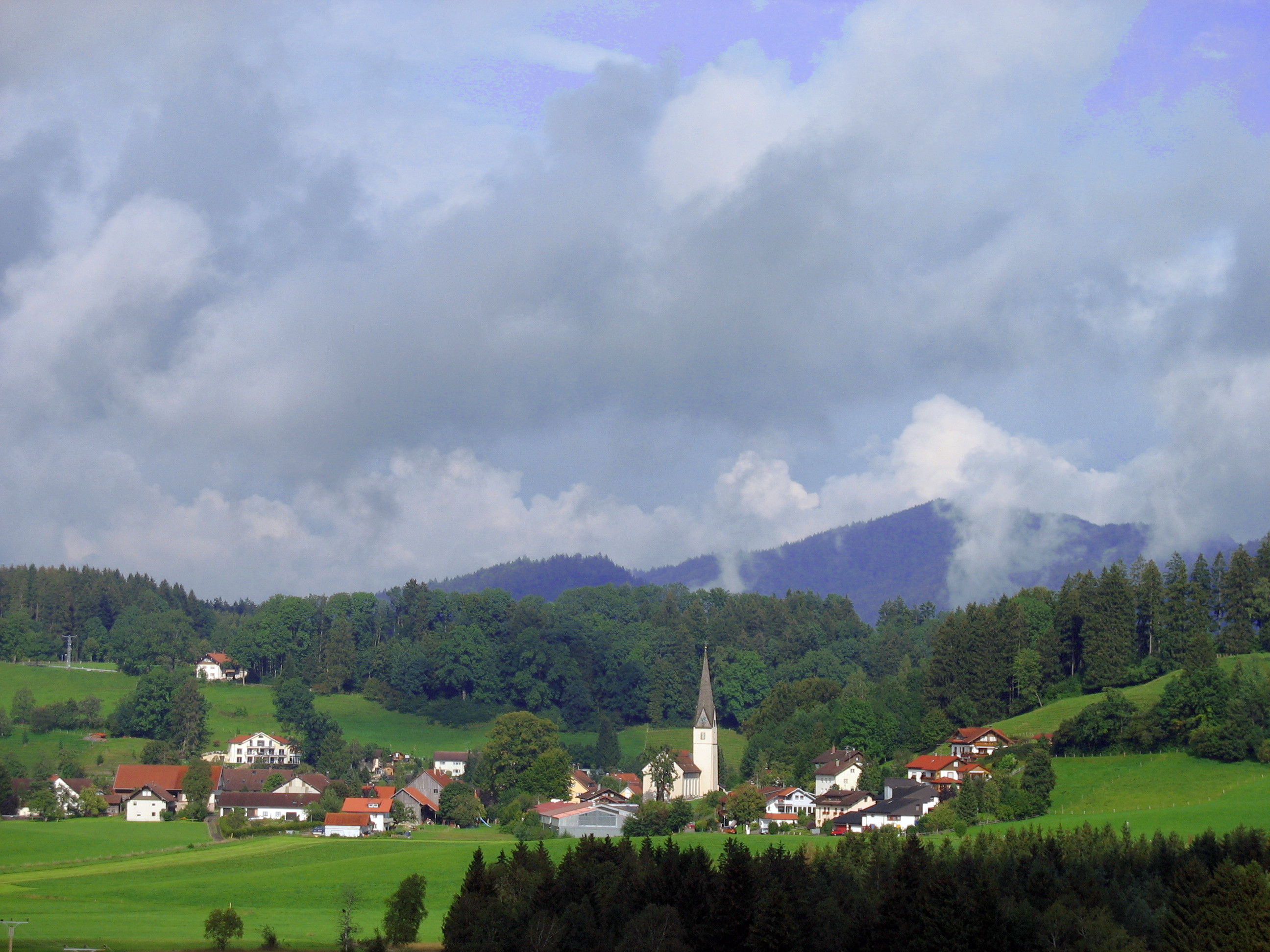
- General view of Röthenbach

- Coat of arms

- Location of Röthenbach within Lindau district
- Interactive map of Röthenbach
- Location within Germany Location within Bavaria
- Coordinates: 47°37′N 9°59′E
- Country: Germany
- State: Bavaria
- Admin. region: Schwaben
- District: Lindau
- Municipal assoc.: Argental

Government
  - Mayor (2020–26): Stefan Höß (FW)

Area
  - Total: 14.94 km^{2} (5.77 sq mi)
- Elevation: 663 m (2,175 ft)

Population (2025-12-31)
  - Total: 1,964
  - Density: 131.5/km^{2} (340.5/sq mi)
- Time zone: UTC+01:00 (CET)
  - Summer (DST): UTC+02:00 (CEST)
- Postal codes: 88167
- Dialling codes: 08384
- Vehicle registration: LI
- Website: www.gemeinde-roethenbach-allgaeu.de

Röthenbach (Allgäu) (German pronunciation: [ˈʁøːtn̩ˌbax]) is a municipality in the administrative region of Swabia Lindau district and seat of the municipal association Röthenbach.

== Geography ==
Röthenbach (Allgäu) is located in the Allgäu region. The municipality lies between the alps and Lake Constance. Treaty of Pressburg (1805)

== History ==
Röthenbach was first mentioned in 866. At the foundation of the monastery of Mehrerau at the end of the 11th century, the town belonged to its property. Later Röthenbach (Allgäu) was part of the Austrian authority Bregenz-Hohenegg. Since the signing of the peace treaties of Brünn and Preßburg 1805 the town belongs to Bavaria. In the course of the administrative reforms in Bavaria the contemporary municipality was formed by the "Gemeindeedikt" of 1818.

=== Demographics ===
In the area of Röthenbach there were 1,491 inhabitants in 1970, 1,007 in 1987 and 1,722 inhabitants in 2000.

== Politics ==
The mayor of Röthenbach is Stefan Höß (Freie Wähler).

The revenue from the council tax was €1,386,000 in 1999, of which the net amount of business tax added up to €736,000 .

== Economy and infrastructure ==
=== Economy, agriculture and forestry ===
According to the official statistics, in 1998 there were 250 employees who were subject to social insurance contribution in the industry and none in the trading and transport sector at the place of work. In other economic sectors 72 persons were employed at the place of work. Altogether there were 567 employees, who are subject to social insurance contribution at the place of domicile. In the secondary sector of industry there were 6, in main construction work 3 businesses. Moreover, in 1999 54 agricultural businesses existed with a total area of 880 ha.

=== Transport ===
Röthenbach has a station on the Buchloe–Lindau railway, which is located about 2 km west of Röthenbach.

=== Education ===
In 1999 the following institutions existed:

- A kindergarten with 50 kindergarten places and 50 children
- An elementary school with 4 teachers and 99 students
