= List of states in the Holy Roman Empire (E) =

This is a list of states in the Holy Roman Empire beginning with the letter E. Some historians mark the beginning of the Empire as 800, with the coronation of Frankish king Charlemagne ("Charles the Great").

Name	Type	Imperial circle	Imperial diet	History
East Frisia (Ostfriesland)	County; 1654: Principality	Low Rhen	PR	1465: Established; 1517: East Frisia confirmed under rule of local counts 1667: HRE Bench of Secular Princes; 1744: To Prussia; 1806: To Holland; 1810: To France; 1813: To Prussia; 1815: To Hanover
Eberstein	County	Swab	SC	11th Century; 1085: 1st mentioned; ruled by Lords of Eberstein; 1195: HRE Count; 1219: Partitioned into Eberstein Elder Line and Eberstein Younger Line; 1263: Elder line extinct; only Younger line remained 1283: Alt-Eberstein sold to Baden; 1363: Waldangelloch sold to Angelach-Angelach; 1367: Partitioned into Eberstein-Neu-Eberstein and ...
Eberstein Elder Line	County	n/a	n/a	1219: Partitioned from Eberstein; 1263: Extinct; to Simon I of Zweibrücken as Zweibrücken-Eberstein
Eberstein Younger Line	County	n/a	n/a	1219: Partitioned from Eberstein; 1263: Renamed to Eberstein
Eberstein-Eberstein	County	Swab	n/a	1526: Partitioned from Eberstein-Neu-Eberstein; 1574: Partitioned into itself and Eberstein-Wertenstein-Frauenburg; 1660: Extinct; to Bishopric of Speyer, Baden and Württemberg; 1753: Württemberg portion to Baden; 1803: All to Baden
Eberstein-Poltringen	County	Swab	n/a	1562: Partitioned from Eberstein-Neu-Eberstein; 1576: Extinct; to Eberstein-Neu-Eberstein
Eberstein-Neu-Eberstein	County	Swab	n/a	1367: Partitioned from Eberstein; 1387: Half of Neu-Eberstein sold to Baden; 1526: Partitioned into itself and Eberstein-Eberstein; 1576: Partitioned into itself and Eberstein-Poltringen; 1589: Extinct; to Eberstein-Eberstein and Eberstein-Wertenstein-Frauenburg
Eberstein-Wertenstein-Frauenburg	County	Swab	n/a	1574: Partitioned from Eberstein-Eberstein; 1622: Extinct; to Eberstein-Eberstein
Echternach	Abbacy	Low Rhen	RP	698: Abbey established 751: Imperial immediacy 1794: To France; 1797: Abbey suppressed; monks dispersed
Edelstetten	Abbacy; 1802: Lordship; 1804: Princely County	Swab	SP / PR	1126: Abbey established 1500: Converted to secular nunnery 1783: Imperial abbey 1802: Secularised; to Ligne; 1804: Sold to Esterházy von Galántha; 1806: To Bavaria
Eggenberg	Principality	Aust	PR	1432: First mentioned 1647: Acquired Gradisca; 1653: HRE Council of Princes; 1717: Extinct
Eglingen	Lordship	Swab	SC	1144: First mentioned; to Fronhofen; 1249: To Oettingen; sovereignty disputed by Bavaria; 1615: To Grafeneck; 1723: Sold to Thurn and Taxis; 1806: To Bavaria; 1810: To Württemberg
Eglofs (Egloff)	Imperial Valley	n/a	n/a	1283: Free Imperial Village; 1662: Sold to Abensberg-Traun by the Emperor; see Lordship below
Eglofs (Egloff)	Lordship; County	Swab	SC	1662: Free Valley of Eglofs sold to Abensberg-Traun; 1804: To Windisch-Graetz Elder Line; 1806: To Württemberg
Ehrenburg	Lordship	n/a	n/a	1324: Built by Schwarzburg; 1416: To Witzleben; 1430: To Schwarzburg; 1482: To Lichtenberg; 15??: To Schwarzburg
Ehrenfels	Lordship; 1465: Barony	Bav	SC	11th Century; 1335: Half to Stauff; 1432: Other half to Stauff; 1465: HRE Baron; 1568: Sold to Palatinate-Neuburg
Eichstätt (Eichstatt; Eichstadt)	Bishopric	Franc	EC	741: Diocese established 908: Imperial immediacy 1305: HRE Prince of the Empire; 1802: To Bavaria; 1803: To Salzburg; 1805: To Bavaria
Eilenburg	County	n/a	n/a	976; 1017: Annexed to Meißen
Einsiedeln	Abbacy	Swab	SP	934: Abbey established at site of hermitage 1274: Imperial immediacy 1424: To Schwyz though retained abbey itself retained independence 1648: Left the Empire as part of Switzerland
Elbing (Elbląg)	Imperial City	n/a	n/a	1358: Imperial Free City; 1454: To Poland
Elchingen	Abbacy	Swab	SP	1128: Abbey established with imperial immediacy 1802: To Bavaria; 1810: To Württemberg
Ellwangen	Abbacy; 1460: Provostry	Swab	EC	c. 764: Abbey established 1011: Imperial immediacy 1215: HRE Prince of the Empire; 1460: Converted to a provostry 1803: Secularised to Württemberg
Elten	Abbacy	n/a	n/a	967: Abbey established 973: Imperial immediacy 1083: To Archbishopric of Bremen; 1129: Imperial immediacy 1390: HRE Princess of the Empire; 1802: To Prussia; 1806: To Berg; 1811: To France; 1815: To Prussia
Eltz	Lordship	n/a	n/a	12th Century; 1336: Fiefs to the Archbishopric of Trier; 1729: HRE Knight; 1733: HRE Count (Main line); 1794: To France
Ems	Lordship	n/a	n/a	11th Century; 14th Century: Imperial immediacy 1395: Acquired Lustenau; 1453: Renamed to Hohenems
Engelberg	Abbacy	Swab	SP	1120: Abbey established 1236: Acquired secular territory 1425: Associated member of Swiss Confederation; 1648: Left the Empire as part of Switzerland
Enzberg	Lordship	n/a	n/a	1236: First mentioned; ministerialis of the Bishopric of Speyer; 1384: Cast out of Speyer and Maulbronn; 1409: Acquired Mühlheim; 1806: To Baden, then Württemberg
Eppstein	Lordship	n/a	n/a	1172: Renamed from "Hainhausen"; 1223: Partitioned into Eppstein Elder Line and Eppstein Younger Line; 1269: Renamed from Younger Line; 1433: Partitioned into Eppstein-Königstein and Eppstein-Münzenberg
Eppstein Elder Line	Lordship	n/a	n/a	1223: Partitioned from Eppstein; 1269: Extinct; succession dispute between Eppstein Younger Line and Katzenelnbogen Younger Line. Most fell to the latter
Eppstein Younger Line	Lordship	n/a	n/a	1223: Partitioned from Eppstein; 1269: Renamed to Eppstein
Eppstein-Königstein	Lordship; 1505: County	Upp Rhen	WE	1433: Partitioned from Eppstein; 1505: HRE Count; 1535: Extinct; to Louis of Stolberg who founded the line Stolberg-Königstein
Eppstein-Münzenberg	Lordship; 1505: County	Upp Rhen	WE	1433: Partitioned from Eppstein; 1505: HRE Count; 1522: Extinct; to Leiningen-Hardenburg
Erbach	Lordship; 1532: County	Franc	FC	1148: First mentioned 1272: Partitioned into Erbach-Erbach and Erbach-Reichenberg; 1531: Reunited by Erbach-Reichenberg; 1532: HRE Count; 1539: Partitioned into Erbach-Fürstenau, Erbach-Erbach and Erbach-Schönberg; 1569: Reunited by Erbach-Erbach; 1605: Partitioned into Erbach-Fürstenau, Erbach-Breuberg, Erbach-Erbach and Erbach-Schönberg; 1643: Reunited by Erbach-Schönberg; 1647: Partitioned into Erbach-Wildenstein, Erbach-Breuberg, Erbach-Erbach, Erbach-Fürstenau and Erbach-Schönberg
Erbach-Breuburg	County	Franc	FR	1605: Partitioned from Erbach; 1627: Extinct; divided between Erbach-Erbach and Erbach-Schönberg; 1647: Partitioned from Erbach; 1653: Extinct; to Erbach-Wildenstein; 1717: Partitioned from Erbach-Schönberg; 1747: Renamed to Erbach-Erbach
Erbach-Erbach	Lordship; 1539: County	Franc	FR	1272: Partitioned from Erbach; 1503: Extinct; to Erbach-Reichenberg; 1539: Partitioned from Erbach; 1569: Renamed to Erbach; 1605: Partitioned from Erbach; 1643: Extinct; to Erbach-Schönberg; 1647: Partitioned from Erbach; 1731: Extinct; to Erbach-Fürstenau, Erbach-Breuberg and Erbach-Schönberg; 1747: Renamed from Erbach-Breuberg; 1806: To Hesse-Darmstadt
Erbach-Fürstenau	County	Franc	FR	1539: Partitioned from Erbach; 1569: Extinct; to Erbach-Erbach; 1605: Partitioned from Erbach; 1618: Extinct; divided between Erbach-Breuberg, Erbach-Erbach and Erbach-Schönberg; 1647: Partitioned from Erbach; 1714: Extinct; to Erbach-Schönberg; 1717: Partitioned from Erbach-Schönberg; 1806: To Hesse-Darmstadt
Erbach-Michelstadt	Lordship	Franc	FR	1339: Partitioned from Erbach-Reichenberg; 1531: Extinct; to Erbach-Reichenberg
Erbach-Reichenberg	Lordship	Franc	FR	1272: Partitioned from Erbach; 1339: Partitioned into itself and Erbach-Michelstadt; 1531: Renamed to Erbach
Erbach-Schönberg	County	Franc	FR	1539: Partitioned from Erbach; 1564: Extinct; to Erbach-Erbach; 1605: Partitioned from Erbach; 1643: Renamed to Erbach; 1647: Partitioned from Erbach; 1717: Partitioned into Erbach-Fürstenau, Erbach-Breuberg and itself 1806: To Hesse-Darmstadt
Erbach-Wildenstein	County	Franc	FR	1647: Partitioned from Erbach; 1669: Extinct; to Erbach-Erbach
Eschenlohe	Lordship; 13th Century: County	n/a	n/a	1140: First mentioned 13th Century: HRE Count; 1294: Sold Werdenfels to Freising; 1295: Extinct; to Iffeldorf
Essen	Abbacy	Low Rhen	EC	c. 850: Abbey established betw. 874-947: Imperial immediacy 1228: HRE Princess of the Empire; 1802: To Prussia; 1808: To Berg; 1815: To Prussia
Esslingen am Neckar	Imperial City	Swab	SW	c. 1250: Free Imperial City; 1802: To Württemberg
Esterau	Lordship	n/a	n/a	12th Century: To Laurenburg; 1197: To Nassau; 1643: To Holzappel; 1707: To Anhalt-Bernburg-Schaumburg-Hoym; 1806: To Nassau
Esterházy von Galántha	Principality	Swab	PR	1804: Purchased Edelstetten from Ligne (College of Princes); 1806: Edelstetten to Bavaria
