= Badsee =

Nature reserve in Baden-Württemberg, Germany

Badsee Nature Reserve
- Naturschutzgebiet Badsee
- IUCN category IV (habitat/species management area)
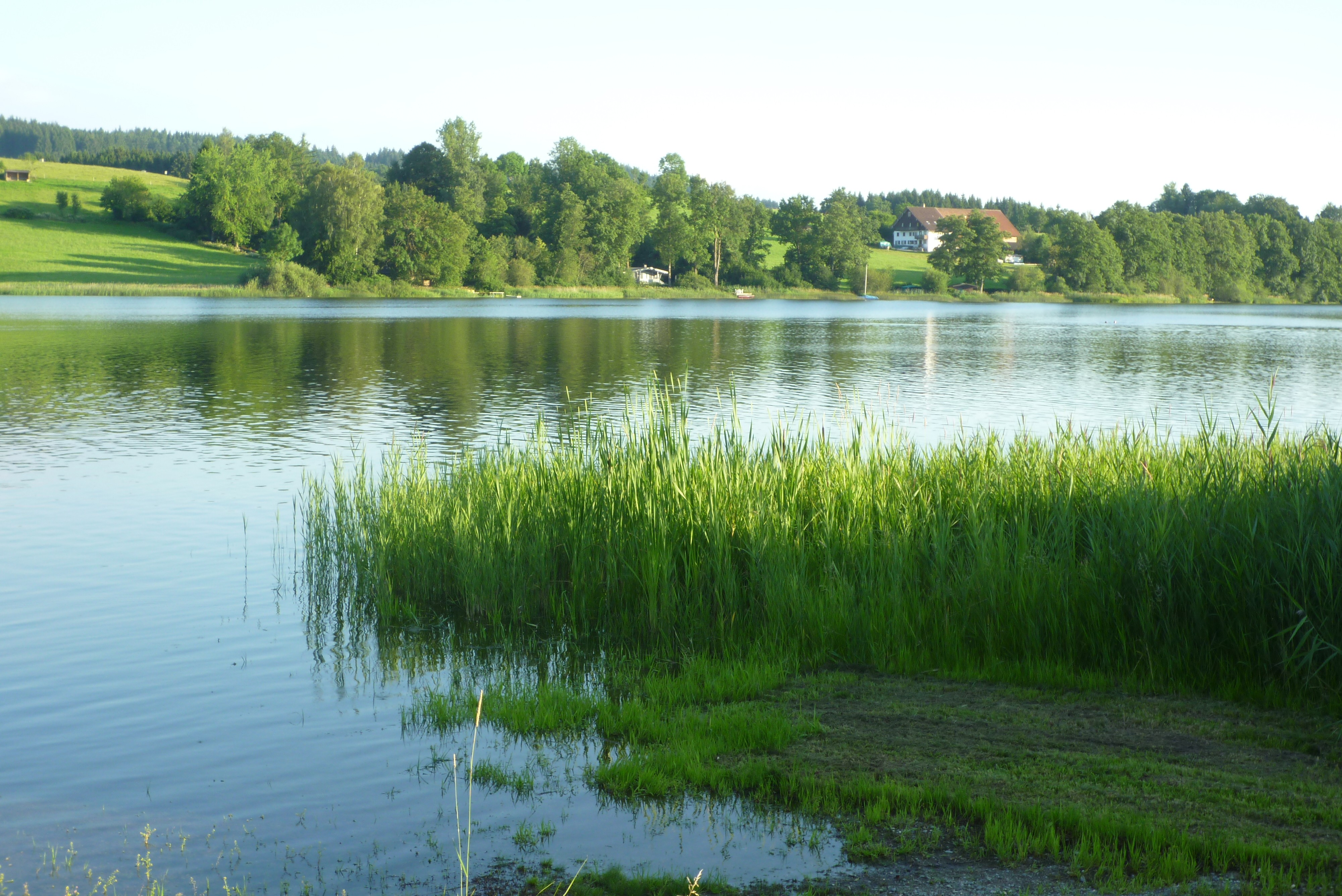
- View of Badsee

- Location within Germany Location within Baden-Württemberg
- Location: Argenbühl, Baden-Württemberg, Germany
- Nearest city: Ravensburg
- Coordinates: 47°44′51″N 9°59′31″E
- Established: 21 January 1991

The Badsee area is a Naturschutzgebiet (nature reserve) in the northwest of the town of Isny im Allgäu and northeast of the municipality of Argenbühl, Baden-Württemberg in Germany, designated by decree of January 21, 1991 by the Regional Council of Tübingen. Badsee has NSG number of 4.178.

== Location ==
The approximately 17-hectare Badsee nature reserve is part of the Westallgäu hill country. It is located about seven kilometers northwest of Isnys town center, on the southwestern part of the Badsee (also known as Haldensee), at an altitude of 680 m above sea level. In the cadastral maps, the districts between the hamlets of Winnis to the north, Beuren to the south and Enkenhofen to the west, in a former tongue basin of the Rhine glacier, are named Christazhofen (belonging to Argenbühl) and Beuren (belonging to Isny).

== Conservation Purpose ==
The primary goal of this protection effort is to safeguard the lake used for swimming and the nearby silting bog. This area showcases a distinctive natural progression, ranging from zones of floating leaves to raised bogs, serving as a prime example of such ecological succession. It acts as a crucial sanctuary for diverse and valuable wildlife and plant species, offering them a haven amidst the otherwise heavily utilized lake. Furthermore, this area plays a vital role as a key connector within the network of wetlands in the region, providing an essential stop over for migratory birds. This effort underscores the importance of preserving natural habitats in areas subjected to intensive human activity, ensuring the conservation of biodiversity and supporting ecological balance.

== Landscape conservation area ==
Adjacent to the nature reserve is the Badsee Landscape Protection Area, spanning 1,069 hectares. Established in 1981, it aims to preserve the unique characteristics of the Allgäu landscape, which includes both standing and flowing bodies of water, particularly the shoreline areas, as well as bogs, meadows, forests, and shrublands. This designation protects the area's distinctive topographical features and supports the conservation of local wildlife and plant species. Additionally, it ensures the maintenance of the area's suitability for recreation, safeguarding its natural beauty and ecological importance for future generations.

== Recreational Activities ==
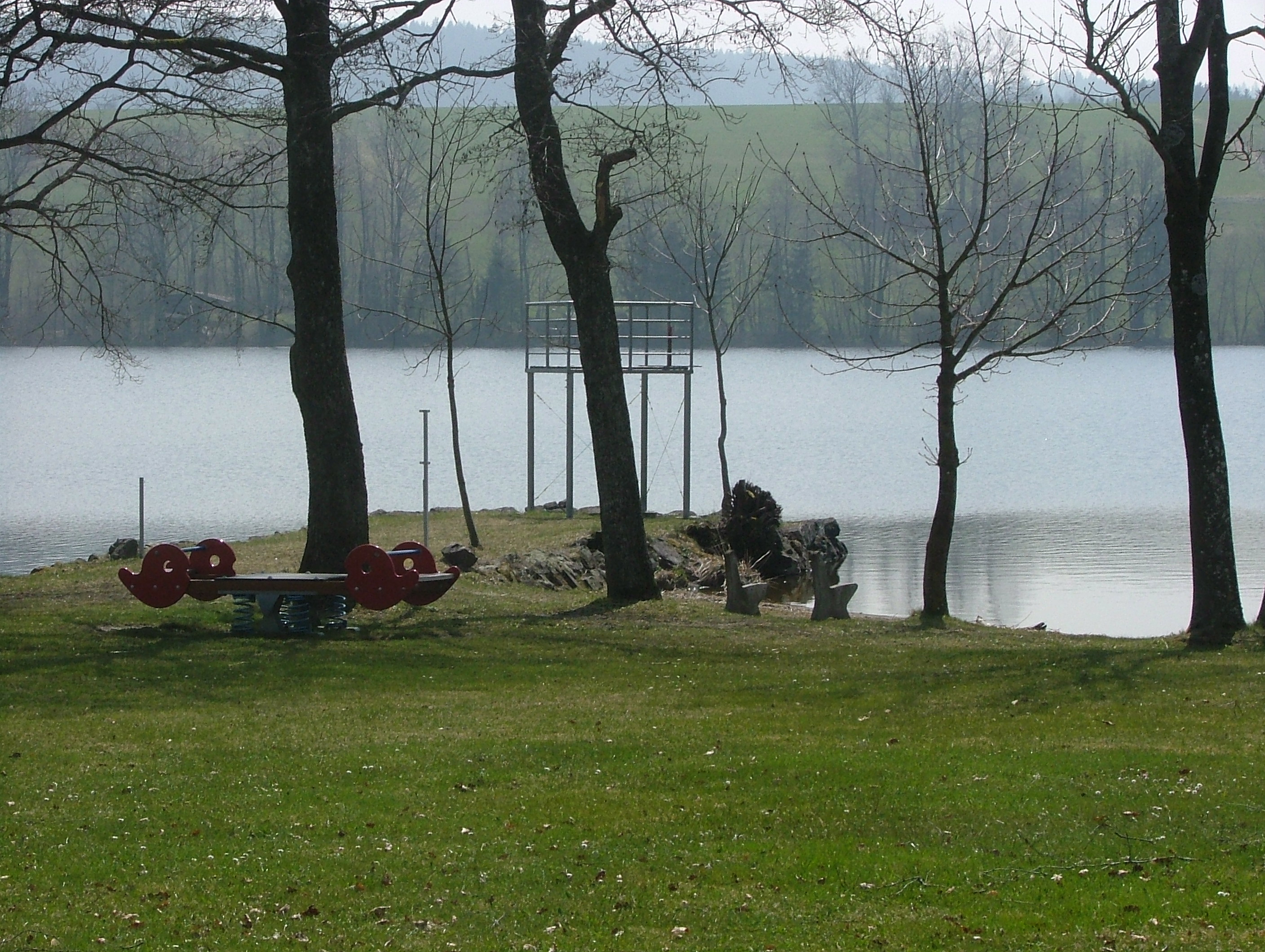
Park in Badsee

Badsee offers a variety of outdoor activities catering to visitors of all ages. The lake is encircled by a 7-kilometer-long, predominantly flat trail that is ideal for hiking, jogging, Nordic walking, and cycling. This accessible route is family-friendly and also serves as a popular path for cyclists traveling between Isny and Wangen.

Adjacent to the northern shore of the lake, there is an outdoor swimming pool equipped with a spacious sunbathing lawn. Here, visitors can directly access the water, which pleasantly warms up to over 20 degrees Celsius during the summer months. The lake is a hub for various water-based activities, including splashing around, swimming, and embarking on pedal or paddle boat tours. Additionally, a VDWS-certified surf school offers courses suitable for both beginners and seasoned enthusiasts. For refreshments and relaxation, visitors can head to the restaurant and kiosk located at the nearby campsite.

=== Heart Hiking Trail and Moor Exploration ===
The camping park has developed the Heart Hiking Trail, a 2.7-kilometer path adorned with intricately designed wooden hearts, showcasing the beautiful landscape of the lake, forest, and meadows. The trail is designed to be accessible, making it suitable for visitors with baby carriages.

For those interested in longer hikes, the lake circuit can be combined with various trails through the Fetzachmoos, such as the Beuren Forest Adventure Trail. The raised bog area features fascinating natural phenomena, including primeval lakes and "dead ice holes" – depressions filled with Ice Age meltwater. During the spring and fall, the moor and Badsee (also known as Haldensee) become a resting spot for numerous migratory bird species, adding a unique aspect to the area's natural diversity.
