= Traun =

- Municipality
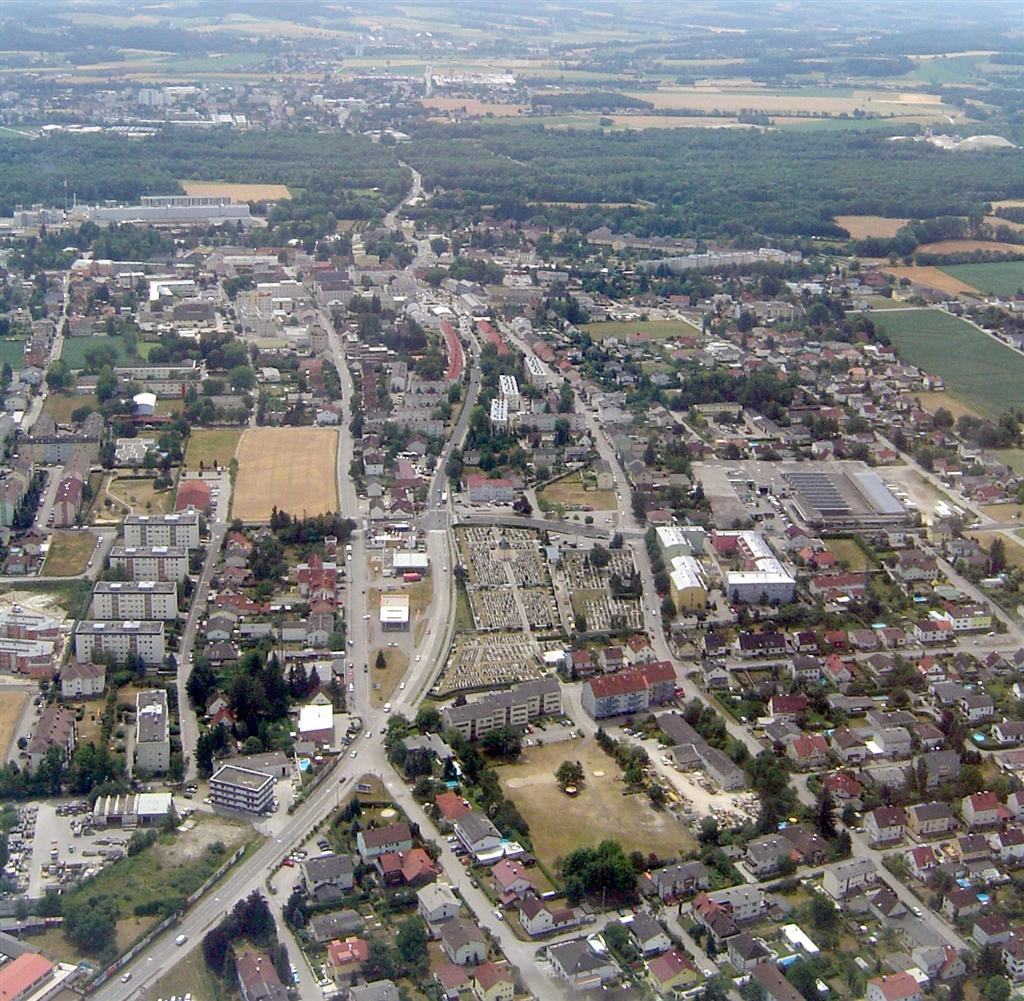
- Traun panorama

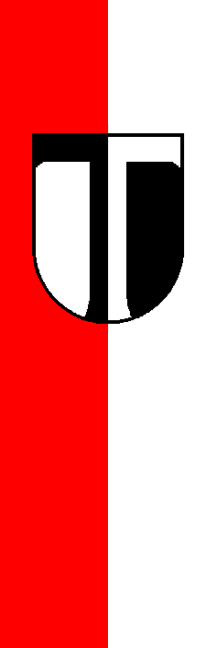
- Flag Coat of arms

- Location within Austria
- Coordinates: 48°13′18″N 14°14′23″E
- Country: Austria
- State: Upper Austria
- District: Linz-Land

Government
  - Mayor: Karl-Heinz Koll (ÖVP)

Area
  - Total: 15.49 km^{2} (5.98 sq mi)
- Elevation: 273 m (896 ft)

Population (2018-01-01)
  - Total: 24,477
  - Density: 1,580/km^{2} (4,093/sq mi)
- Time zone: UTC+1 (CET)
  - Summer (DST): UTC+2 (CEST)
- Postal code: 4050
- Area code: 07229
- Vehicle registration: LL
- Website: www.traun.at

Traun (Austrian German: [traʊn]) is an Austrian municipality located on the north bank of the river Traun and borders Linz, the capital of Upper Austria, to the east. The name Traun is derived from the Celtic word for river (dru). Traun is the fifth largest town in Upper Austria, located in the district of Linz-Land.

== History ==
Neolithic: Excavation findings suggest that the first settlements date to when the Roman road led from Wels to Lorch (Enns).
6th century: Bavarii settle in the area of Traun.
about 790: The name dru appears on a document for the first time.
about 813 to 824: First mentioning as a place in a document.
1113: First evidence of the former moated castle.
1560: Reconstruction of the castle into a Renaissance building.
1725: Reconstruction of the castle into a Baroque building.
1784: First school in Traun opens.
1785: Fusion with the villages of St. Dionysen and Oedt.
about 1850: First industries: Enderlin, Berl and Graumann brothers (textiles), Dr. Feurstein (paper), Gabler (flat and braid products), Enenkel (vinegar factory).
1851: Inauguration of the first Protestant school.
1876: The St. Martin district transferred from the community of Kleinmünchen to Traun.
1882: Construction of the Catholic parish church.
1884: The owner of the castle (count Abensperg-Traun) moves back to the estates in Lower Austria.
1913: Inauguration of the Protestant church.
1915: Inauguration of the new Protestant school.
1965: Lake Oedter See begins to be used for bathing.
1973: Traun, the 'biggest village of Austria' is elevated to a city. The Bundesschulzentrum Traun (home of the 2 high schools Bundesrealgymnasium and Handelsakademie) opens. The building's modern design served as model for schools in the 70s.
1975: The bathing center (Badezentrum) opens with two indoor swimming pools with a sauna and restaurant. Later extended to include an open-air pool, a lawn for sunbathing and an ice-skating rink.
1979: The sports center and stadium (HAKA-Arena) opens.
1982: Firefighters and red cross-center as well as Telegraph office open.
1985: Opening of the New City Hall and the City Gallery.
1991: Introduction of the City Buses.
1997: The new B139 (bypass road) is finished and the Spinnerei (a cultural center for youths) opens.
1999: Redesign of the main square, new ice-skating rink and renovation of the bathing center.
2002: The high school HTL-Traun (Höhere technische Lehranstalt) opens, starting in a provisional building.
2005: Opening of the Traun District Court.
2012: The new building housing the HTL-Traun high school opens.

== Population ==
Historical population
Year	Pop.	±%
1869	1,781	—
1880	2,378	+33.5%
1890	3,308	+39.1%
1900	4,271	+29.1%
1910	5,026	+17.7%
1923	4,830	−3.9%
1934	5,512	+14.1%
1939	5,985	+8.6%
1951	9,655	+61.3%
1961	16,026	+66.0%
1971	21,215	+32.4%
1981	21,464	+1.2%
1991	22,260	+3.7%
2001	23,470	+5.4%
2011	23,810	+1.4%

Largest groups of foreign residents
Nationality	Population (2026)
Romania	1,246
Bosnia and Herzegovina	1,226
Croatia	799
Turkey	677
Hungary	371
Serbia	338
Germany	336
Kosovo	309
North Macedonia	304
Slovenia	277
Bulgaria	210
Slovakia	181
Syria	144
Afghanistan	128
Iraq	105
Italy	94
Russian Federation	93
Ukraine	79
Poland	78
Czech Republic	62
Iran	31

== Educational Institutions ==
Traun is also known as school city for having almost all types of educational institutions.

- 11 kindergartens: Oedt, St. Dionysen I, St. Dionysen II, St. Martin, Zentrum, Traun I, Traun II, Traun III, Traun IV, Caritas-Kindergarten St. Dionysen and St. Martin
- 4 primary schools: Volksschule Oedt, Volksschule Traun, Volksschule St. Dionysen and Volksschule St. Martin.
- 3 secondary schools: Hauptschule I (Computing), Hauptschule II (Music), Hauptschule St. Martin
- 2 other primary/secondary schools: Integratives Schulzentrum, Polytechnische Schule
- 3 high schools: Bundesrealgymnasium (700), Handelakademie/Handelsschule, Höhere technische Lehranstalt und Fachschule (300)
- 2 institutions for adult education: BFI Traun, Volkshochschule Traun
- 1 music school: Landesmusikschule

== Economy ==
Traun is located in the economic center of Upper Austria. Notable national and international operating companies are based in Traun, like Internorm, Ed. Haas, Pez, Tannpapier (Trierenberg Holding), Feurstein (Delfort Group), Ing. Voith, C+C Pfeiffer, delfortgroup and Gabler Band.

There are more than 1200 companies in Traun having about 11,000 employees in total.

== Transportation ==
=== Airport ===
Linz Airport is just 3.9 km (2.4 mi) from Traun.

=== Railroad ===
The Phyrnbahn runs through Traun from northeast to south. Two railway stations are located in Traun along the Phyrnbahn: St. Martin and Traun.

=== Motorway (Autobahn) connections ===
- A1 (West Autobahn): Exit Traun (1.8 km), Exit Ansfelden (4.6 km)
- A7 (Mühlkreis Autobahn): Exit Franzosenhausweg (2.0 km), Exit Salzburger Straße (3.3 km)
- A25: Exit Weißkirchen (8.6 km), Exit Marchtrenk (9.1 km)

=== Bundesstraßen ===
- The B1 (Wiener Bundesstraße) runs along the north border of Traun.
- The B139 (Kremstalbundesstraße) crosses Traun from North to East.

=== Landstraßen ===
- L532: Neubauerstraße, Johann Roithner-Straße
- L1386: Leondinger-Straße

=== Tramway ===
In spring 2016, line 3 of the Linz tramway system will be extended to Traun with 4 stops in Traun (Traun - Trauner Kreuzung, Traun - Friedhof, Traun - Hauptplatz and Traun - Schloss).

=== Bus ===
- The Wilhelm Welser Verkehrsbetriebe Traun operates buses on 14 routes in Traun that connect Traun with all neighboring cities and communities. Most routes are serviced by only one single bus and therefore have a frequency of only 1 bus per hour.
- On behalf of Traun, Wilhelm Welser also operates four City-Bus routes within Traun at a frequency of 30 minutes.
- Linz AG has only one route (line 43) that connects Traun with its network. This route has 5 stops along the north border of Traun and is operated at a frequency of 15 minutes most of the time.

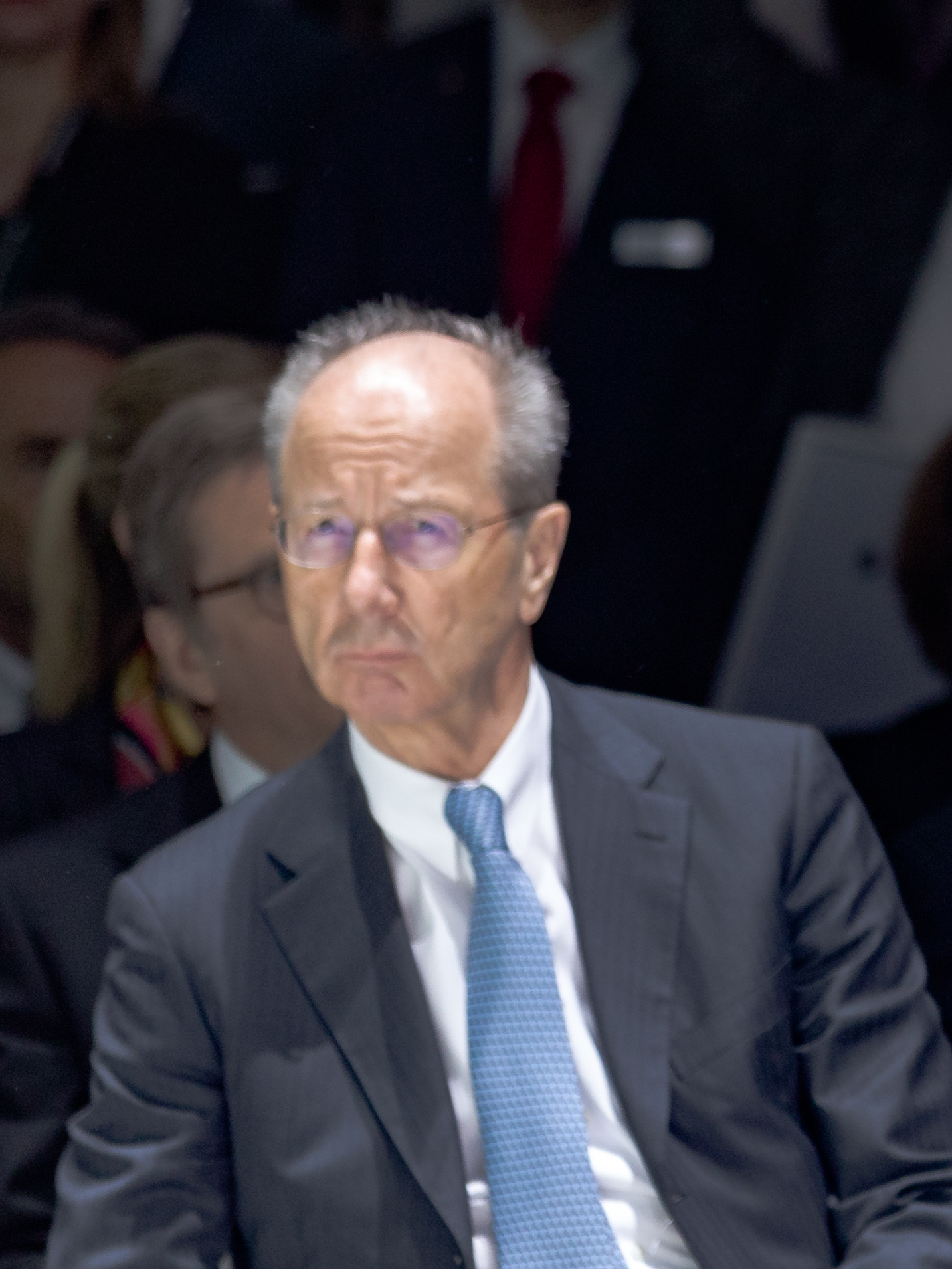
Hans Dieter Potsch, 2018

== Notable people ==
- Francisco Stockinger (1919 – 2009), Austrian/Brazilian artist, sculptor, printmaker and graphic artist.
- Josef Pühringer (born 1949), politician (ÖVP), governor of Upper Austria
- Hans Dieter Pötsch (born 1951), auto executive and board member of Volkswagen
- Harald Seidl, (DE Wiki) (born 1955), politician (SPÖ), Mayor of Traun, 2003-2015
- Martina Salomon, (DE Wiki) (born 1960), went to school locally, journalist and deputy editor of the newspaper Kurier
- Jürgen Koch (born 1973), badminton player
