= Cristal, Porto Alegre =

Neighborhood in Porto Alegre, Brazil

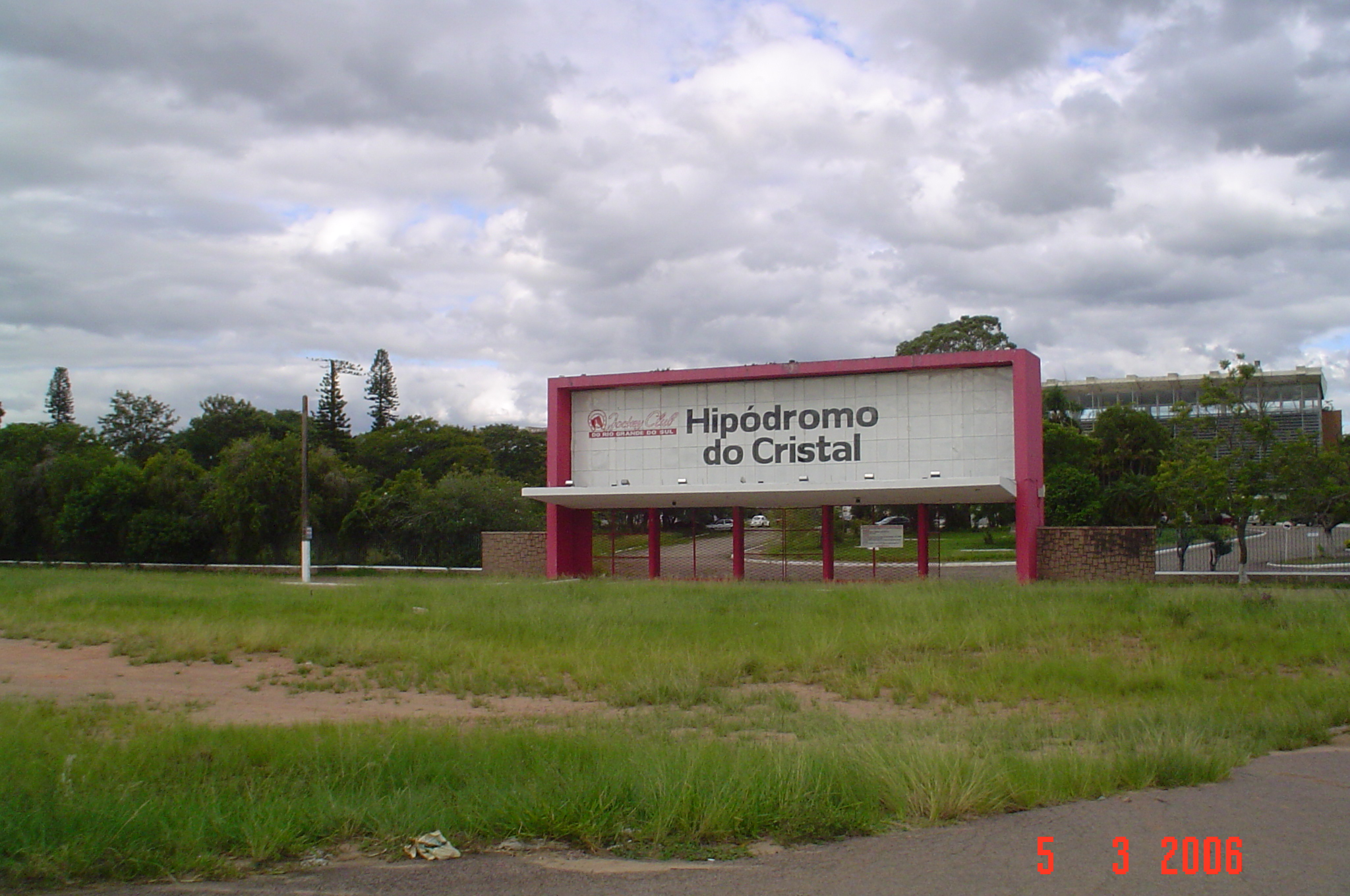
The Hipódromo do Cristal.

Cristal (literally Crystal in English) is a neighbourhood (bairro) in the city of Porto Alegre, the state capital of Rio Grande do Sul, in Brazil. It was created by Law 2022 from December 7, 1959.

Cristal is home to Iberê Camargo Foundation, to the Cristal's hippodrome (the local hippodrome), to Kiss & Fly Poa and to the Barra Shopping Sul.

Also, there is located a highly regarded private school of the city, the Leonardo da Vinci school.

== Famous residents ==
- Francisco Stockinger, sculptor
