= Hans Dieter Pötsch =

Austrian businessman

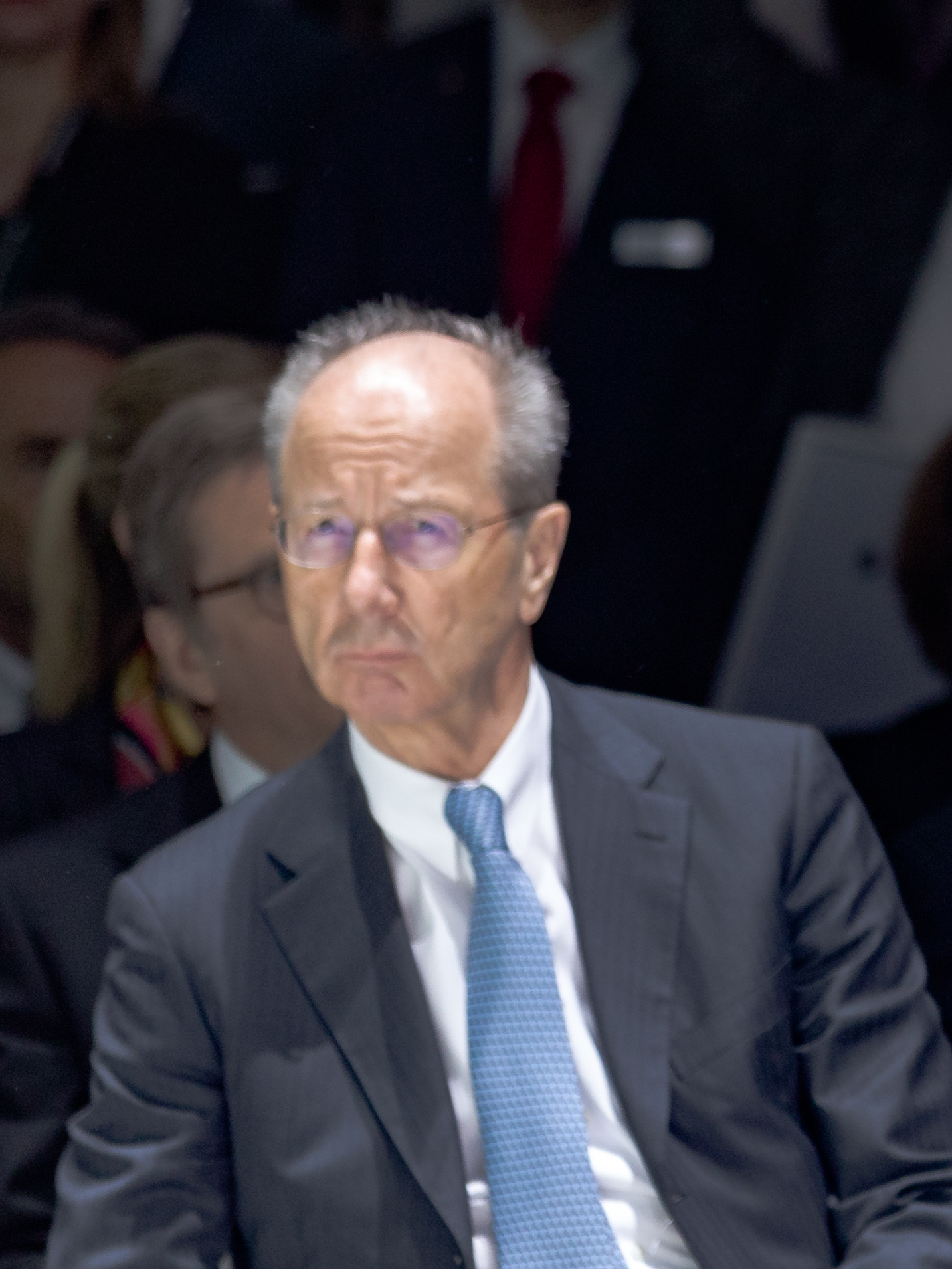
- Pötsch in 2018
- Born: 28 March 1951 (age 75); Traun, Austria
- Occupation: Businessman
- Known for: Chairman of the executive board of Porsche SE; Chairman of the supervisory board of Volkswagen

Hans Dieter Pötsch (born 28 March 1951) is an Austrian businessman, the chairman of the executive board of Porsche SE, and chairman of the supervisory board of Volkswagen since 2015, when he succeeded Ferdinand Piëch.

== Life and career ==
Pötsch was born on 28 March 1951, in Traun near Linz, Austria. Pötsch studied engineering management at Technische Hochschule Darmstadt.

He began his career at BMW, where he worked between 1979 and 1987. He then moved to Trumpf in Ditzingen. From 1991 to 1995, Pötsch was chairman of the board at Traub AG in Reichenbach. From July 1995 until the end of 2002, Pötsch was chairman of the board of management at Dürr AG in Stuttgart.

In 2003, Pötsch became chief financial officer of Volkswagen AG. Since November 2009, Pötsch has additionally been a board member for finance at Porsche Automobil Holding. He held the position until 2015, when he was appointed chairman of the executive board at Porsche, succeeding Martin Winterkorn. Following the resignation of Ferdinand Piëch, Pötsch additionally became chairman of the supervisory board at Volkswagen in 2015. His nomination came at the behest of the Porsche and Piëch families, who together control a majority of VW's voting shares via the Porsche holding company. Frank Witter became Pötsch's successor as CFO at Volkswagen.

In 2016, a German market manipulation probe into the Volkswagen emissions scandal expanded to include Pötsch.

In October 2019, Pötsch was elected President of the German Chamber of Commerce in Austria.

In December 2021, Pötsch's mandate at Porsche was extended until the end of 2026.

== Other activities ==
=== Corporate boards ===
- Autostadt, chairman of the supervisory board
- Bertelsmann, member of the supervisory board (since 2011)
- VfL Wolfsburg, member of the supervisory board (since 2009)
- Deutsche Bank, member of the advisory board
- Landesbank Baden-Württemberg (LBBW), member of the advisory board

=== Non-profit organizations ===
- Kunstmuseum Wolfsburg, member of the board of trustees
