= Von Beroldingen =

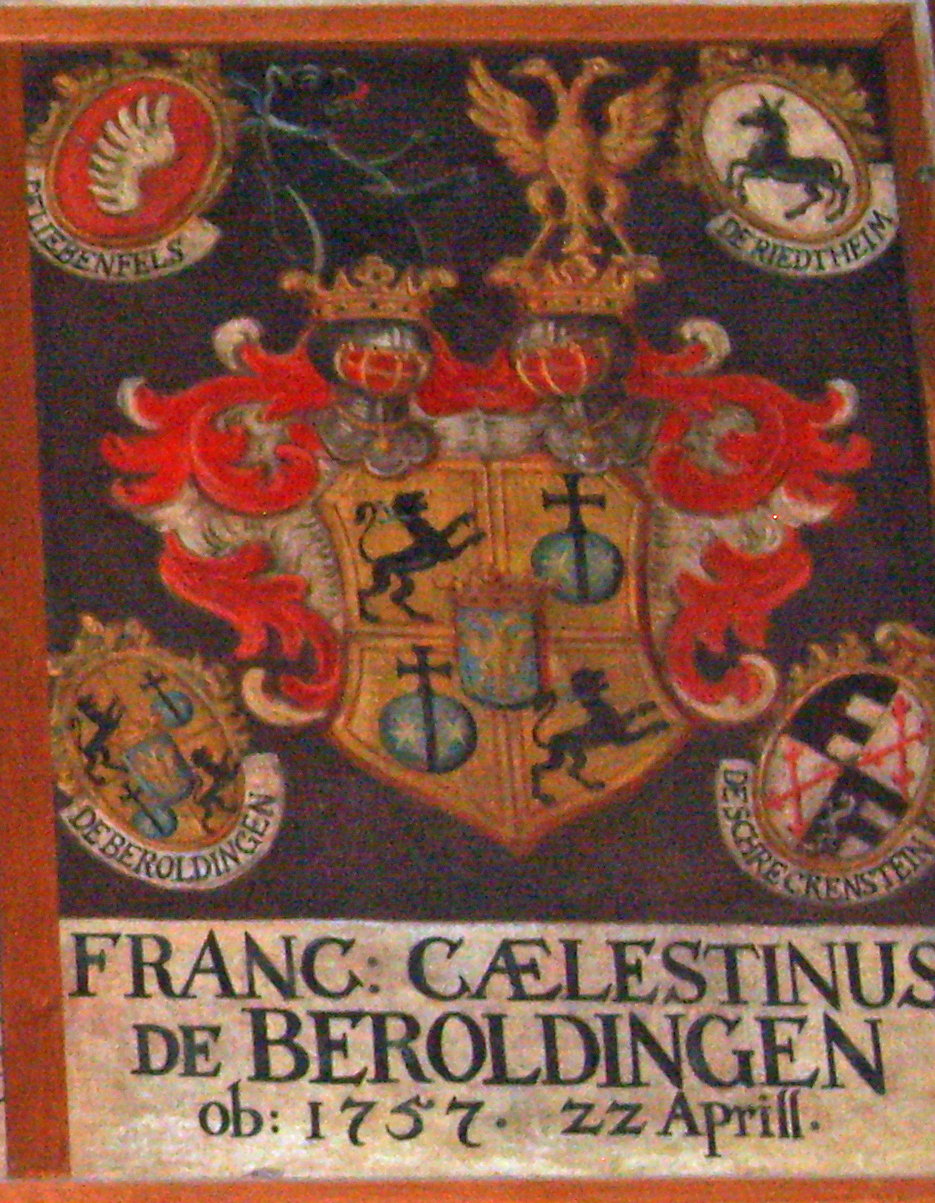
Coat of arms of the Beroldingen family (1757)

The Beroldingen family is a prominent German noble family that can trace its ancestry to Thurgau, in what is today Switzerland.

== History ==
First documented in the 12th century, the family was ennobled in 1521 by Charles V, Holy Roman Emperor. From the beginning of the 16th century, the family seat was Schloss Beroldingen, Canton of Uri, built by Josue, Ritter von Beroldingen (1495–1563). The last Beroldingen to own this castle was Baroness Anna Maria Sibylla von Wrangel (1925–2016), née von Beroldingen.

On 14 February 1800, one line of the family was awarded with the title of Imperial Count by Francis II, Holy Roman Emperor, while there existed other untitled, but noble lines of the family. In 1789, the family came into a possession of Schloss Horn in Göggingen, Baden-Württemberg, which is still in the family, used as a private residence. In 1813, they inherited Schloss Ratzenried, which was in their possession until 1904 when it passed to the House of Waldburg, as the castle's heiress, Countess Maria Immaculata von Beroldingen (1880–1943) married Count Anton von Waldburg-Zeil-Trauchburg (1873–1948). Today, members of the family spread around the world and can be found in Germany, Austria, Switzerland, United States.

== Properties ==
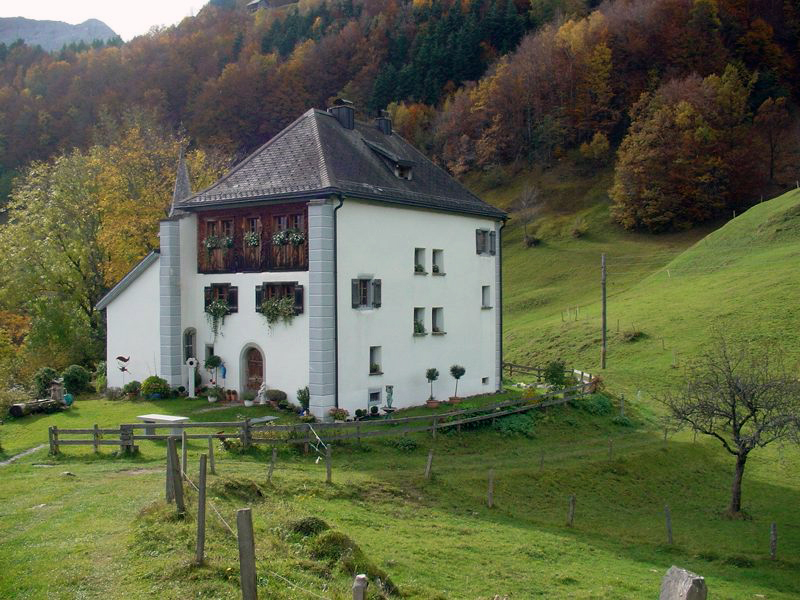
Schloss Beroldingen, Seelisberg, Uri, Switzerland

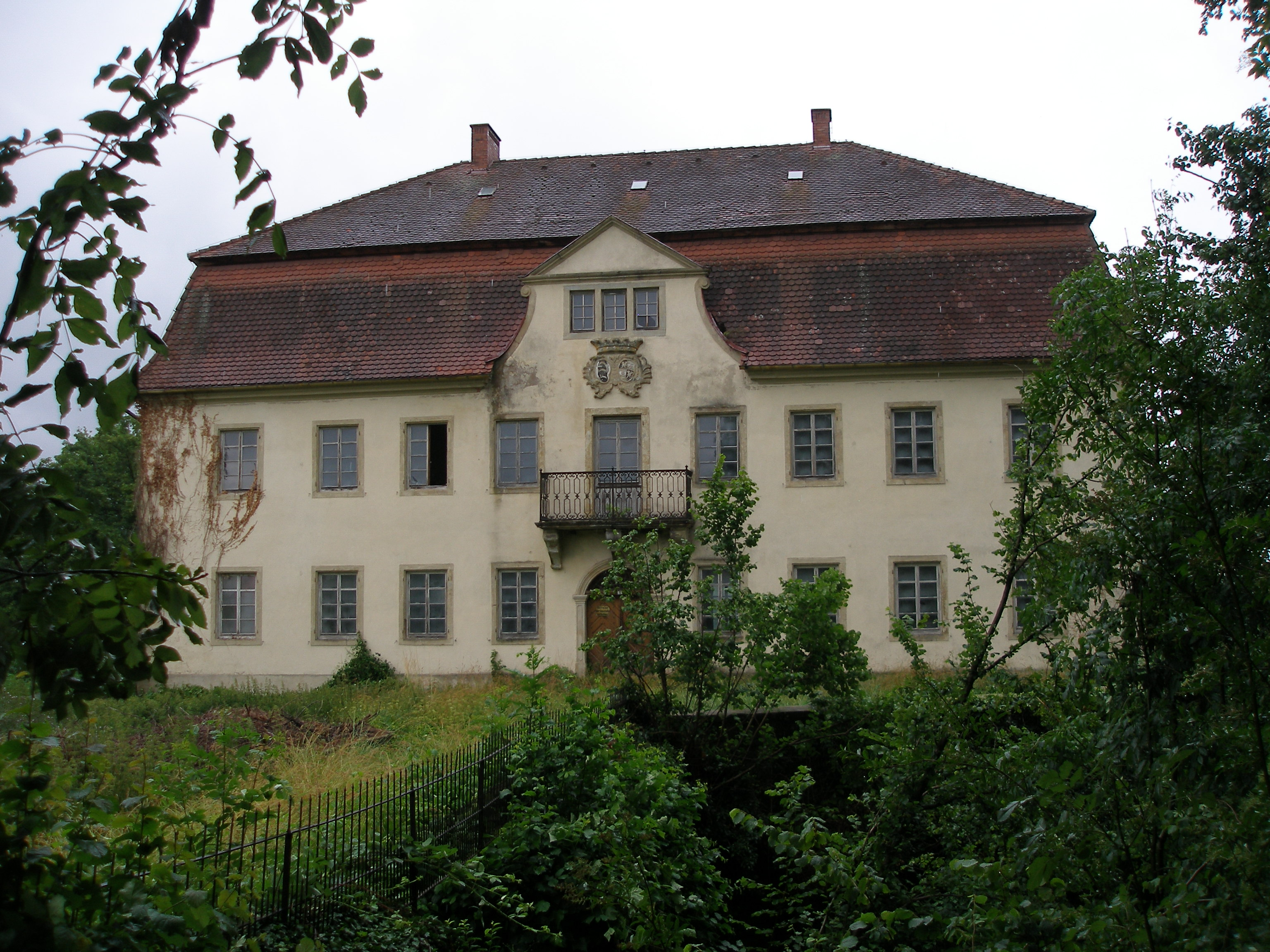
Schloss Horn, Göggingen, Baden-Württemberg

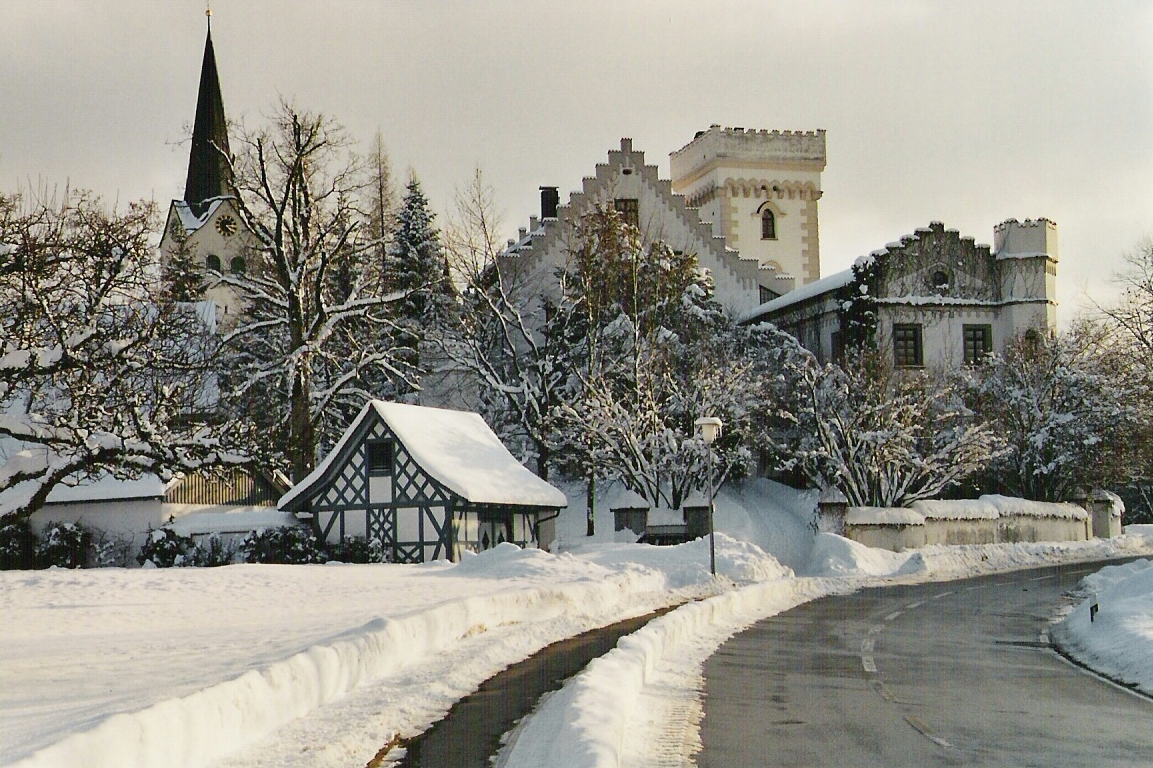
Schloss Ratzenried, Argenbühl, Germany

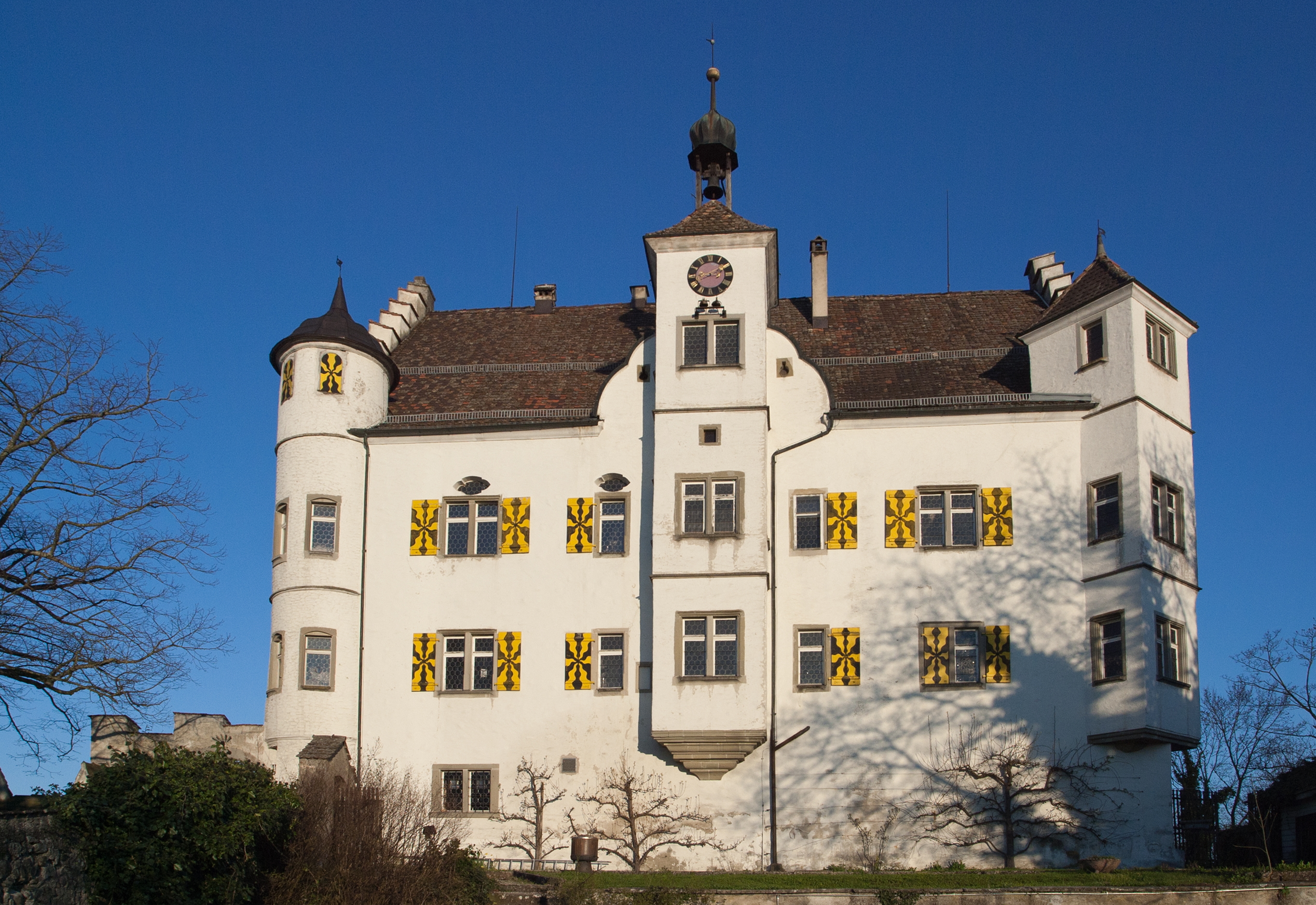
Schloss Sonnenberg, owned by the Beroldingen family (1618–1679), Stettfurt, Switzerland

== Notable members ==
- Dorothy von Beroldingen (1915–1999), American judge
- Margot von Beroldingen (1878–1968), American heiress
