= Meggen Lawn Cross =

Supposed supernatural mark of a cross

Coordinates: 47°44′32″N 9°55′51″E

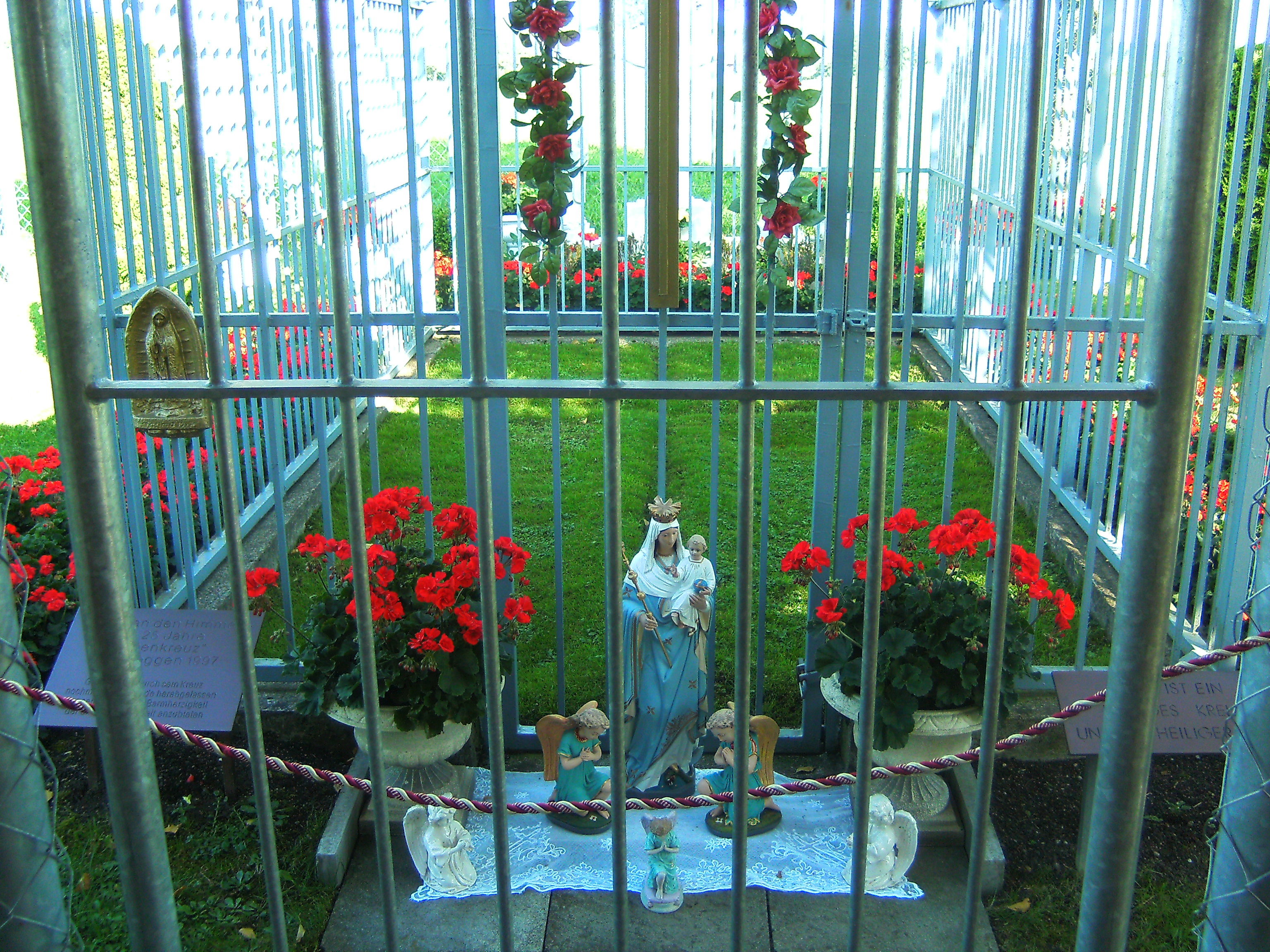
Meggen Lawn Cross

Meggen Lawn Cross is a supposedly supernatural mark of a cross in the ground in Meggen, a village near Argenbühl in Baden-Württemberg, Germany. The Cross first appeared on June 30, 1972, in form of a bald spot in the surrounding field. Later a cross with a length of 3.3 metres and a width of 1.6 metres appeared. The cross reappears each year. Its origin is unknown. Investigations by the University of Hohenheim have been unable to find any cause for the phenomenon.

== See also ==
- Eisenberg an der Raab
