= Dorothy von Beroldingen =

American judge

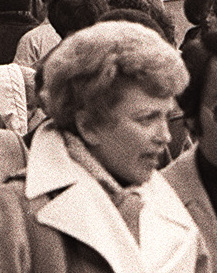
van Beroldigen in 1977

Dorothy von Beroldingen (1915 – 1999) was an American lawyer, judge, and political figure. She served for 11 years on the San Francisco Board of Supervisors and three terms as a San Francisco municipal court and San Francisco County Superior Court judge. A significant figure in San Francisco history, "von Beroldingen fought for more than six decades for equal rights and the advancement of women -- both in private industry and public service. In her capacities as an advertising executive, legal scholar, private attorney, city commissioner, city supervisor, and as the city's senior trial court judge, she achieved a long list of significant 'firsts' for women."

== Early life ==
Dorothy was born on February 12, 1915, in Chicago. She attended the University of San Francisco School of Law and graduated from San Francisco Law School cum laude in 1954. She passed the bar examination in 1955, when there were only 11 women on the list of more than 4,000.

== Career ==
Von Beroldingen has a successful career as a lawyer before entering politics. She was appointed to the San Francisco Civil Service Commission in the early 1960s, where she contributed to ending discrimination in city hiring and promotion of women and gays. Von Beroldingen served on the San Francisco Board of Supervisors from 1966 to 1977. Originally appointed by Mayor John Shelley, she was subsequently elected three times; she was the third woman ever to serve as a member of the board and the first woman to chair its Finance and Budget Committee.

Von Beroldingen was the first woman appointed to the Board of the Golden Gate Bridge, Highway and Transportation District and was instrumental to the San Francisco Commission on the Status of Woman, an anti-workplace gender discrimination agency. In the early 1970s, Von Beroldingen was "the city's first elected official to envision and actively champion a bold concept for using underdeveloped land in the South of Market area to stimulate local economy, create affordable housing and increase jobs," a vision which later became the Mission Bay project.

=== Judicial career ===
She left the board to accept an appointment as a judge of the San Francisco Municipal Court by Governor Jerry Brown. She was reelected unopposed three times, then narrowly defeated Nancy Davis with 50.6% of the vote in a highly contested election in June 1998. Von Beroldingen and her Municipal Court colleagues were automatically elevated to the Superior Court at the end of 1998 as a result of state trial court consolidation. Von Beroldingen stepped down from the bench in July 1999 due to failing health.

== Personal life ==
She engaged in graphic design and opera-singing during her life. She was married to Linton von Beroldingen, was a former managing editor of the San Francisco Examiner. They divorced in 1947. At the time of Dorothy von Beroldingen's death, Linton von Beroldingen was 91, retired, and lived in Oregon.

Beroldingen died at age 84 at Saint Francis Memorial Hospital in San Francisco on December 20, 1999, following complications from spinal and hip fractures suffered in falls caused by osteoporosis. She was survived by her son, Paul von Beroldingen (1944–2022), a public relations consultant in San Francisco.

=== Awards and honors ===
Among the awards and honors she received were being named the Municipal Court Judge of the Year in 1995 by the San Francisco Trial Lawyers Association and receiving the Queen's Bench Lifetime Achievement Award in 1994. Von Beroldingen received high ratings from the San Francisco Bar Association Judicial Evaluation.
