= Lordship of Eglofs =

- Late Middle Ages–1806
- Coat of arms
- Status: State of the Holy Roman Empire
- Capital: Eglofs
- Common languages: Swabian German
- Government: Feudal Lordship
- Lord of Eglofs
- Historical era: Late Middle Ages, Early Modern Period
  - Established: Late Middle Ages
  - Gained imperial immediacy: 1668
  - Disestablished: 1806
Succeeded by
Kingdom of Württemberg
- Today part of: Baden-Württemberg

The Lordship of Eglofs was an estate of the Holy Roman Empire, in the Württemberg Allgäu, located around the village of Eglofs, now in Argenbühl in the rural district of Ravensburg in southern Baden-Württemberg, Germany. From 1668 it was an Imperial Estate in the Holy Roman Empire with a seat on the Bench of Counts of Swabia. It was owned by Abensperg und Traun until 1804, when they sold it to Windisch-Grätz. Two years later, Eglofs was mediatised to the Kingdom of Württemberg.

Eglofs originates from the early 9th century. After the defeat and conquest of the Alemanni in 496 by the Franks, Christian Frankish settlers colonised former Alemanni lands in the Allgäu. Over time, the pagan Alemanni returned to the Allgau and established themselves as farmers. One Alemanni lord, Egilolf, built a castle in modern Eglofs, which over time took his name. The first mention of Eglofs was in 817 in an account of Saint Martin, although the people of Eglofs were still at the time pagan. Owing to its isolation and its proximity to important mountain passes through Switzerland, Eglofs received many rights denied to other settlements; Eglofs had its own courts, it paid fewer taxes, all inhabitants were free citizens (a right denied even to the Swiss cantons) from 1282, and it had the right to elect local leaders. In 1300, King Albert I mentioned Eglofs as a free village.

In 1243, the Emperor promised that the immediate rights of Eglofs would never be sold, but in later centuries the Emperors had need of money and they broke their promise, pawning the village to several different lords. The rights of the citizenry were slowly diminished, which invoked the farmers to ask for aid from the Free Cities of Wangen and Leutkirch. During the German Peasants' War (1524―25) the farmers and soldiers of Wangen burnt down the castle of the local lord and conquered the surrounding land, but with the ultimate victory of the gentry the farmers were brutally punished and the lordship restored. In 1668, the Counts of Abensperg und Traun were granted Eglofs with a seat on the Bench of Counts of Swabia in the Imperial Diet. They held the seat until 1804 when they sold it to the line of Windisch-Grätz-Eglofs. Two years later, it was mediatised to Württemberg.
