= Abensberg-Traun =

Austrian noble family

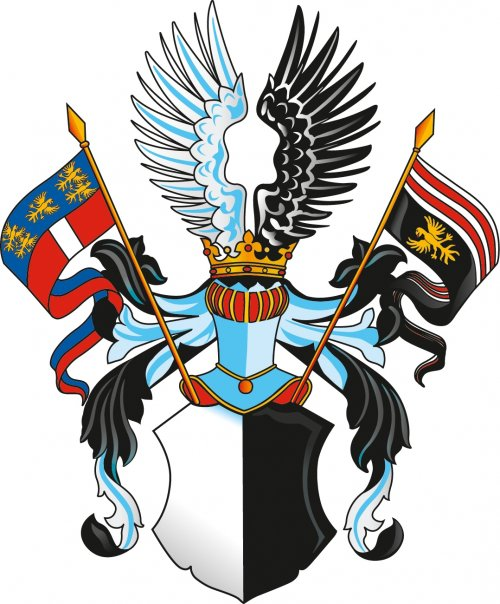
Coat of arms of the family

The House of Abensberg und Traun (now usually written Abensperg-Traun) is the name of an ancient Austrian noble family, originally from the Upper Austrian Traungau. It is considered one of the oldest extant aristocratic families in Central Europe.

== History ==
The Abensberg und Traun family was first mentioned with Pernhart de Trune in 1114. Traun Castle is still today owned by the family. The Trauns are one of the 12 so-called "Apostle Houses", i.e. the families which had already played a historical role during the period of Babenberg rule of Austria (976 to 1246).

They were elevated to Imperial Counts in 1653, receiving the name Counts of Abensperg and Traun, after a Bavarian family, the counts of Abensperg, who had a similar coat of arms, and had ruled the county of Abensberg (Bavaria) from the 12th century until they extinguished with Niclas, Graf von Abensberg in 1485. Only count Ernst von Abensperg und Traun (1608–1668) was very shortly granted the fief of Abensberg when the Habsburg emperor Leopold I occupied Bavaria during the War of the Spanish Succession.

From 1656 the Abensperg and Traun family held a seat on the "Swabian counts' bench" of the Imperial Diet and in 1662 purchased the Lordship of Eglofs, a lordship with Imperial immediacy. It was sold to the Windisch-Graetz family in 1804.

To this day, the Abensperg und Traun family owns large estates in Austria, as well as a number of castles and fortresses.

== Notable family members ==
- Otto Ferdinand von Abensberg und Traun (1677-1748), Austrian aristocrat

== Residences ==
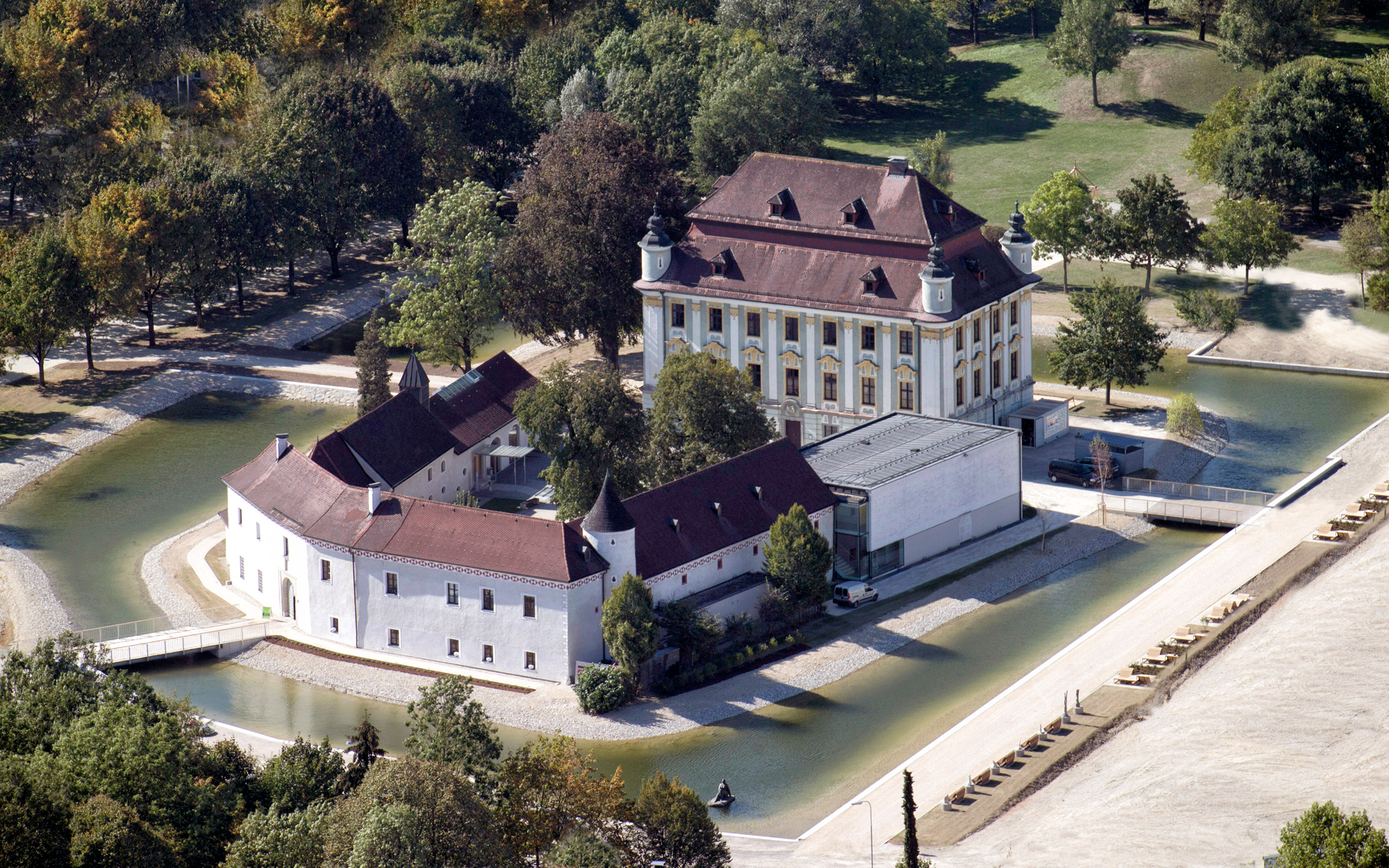
Traun castle (owned since 1120)

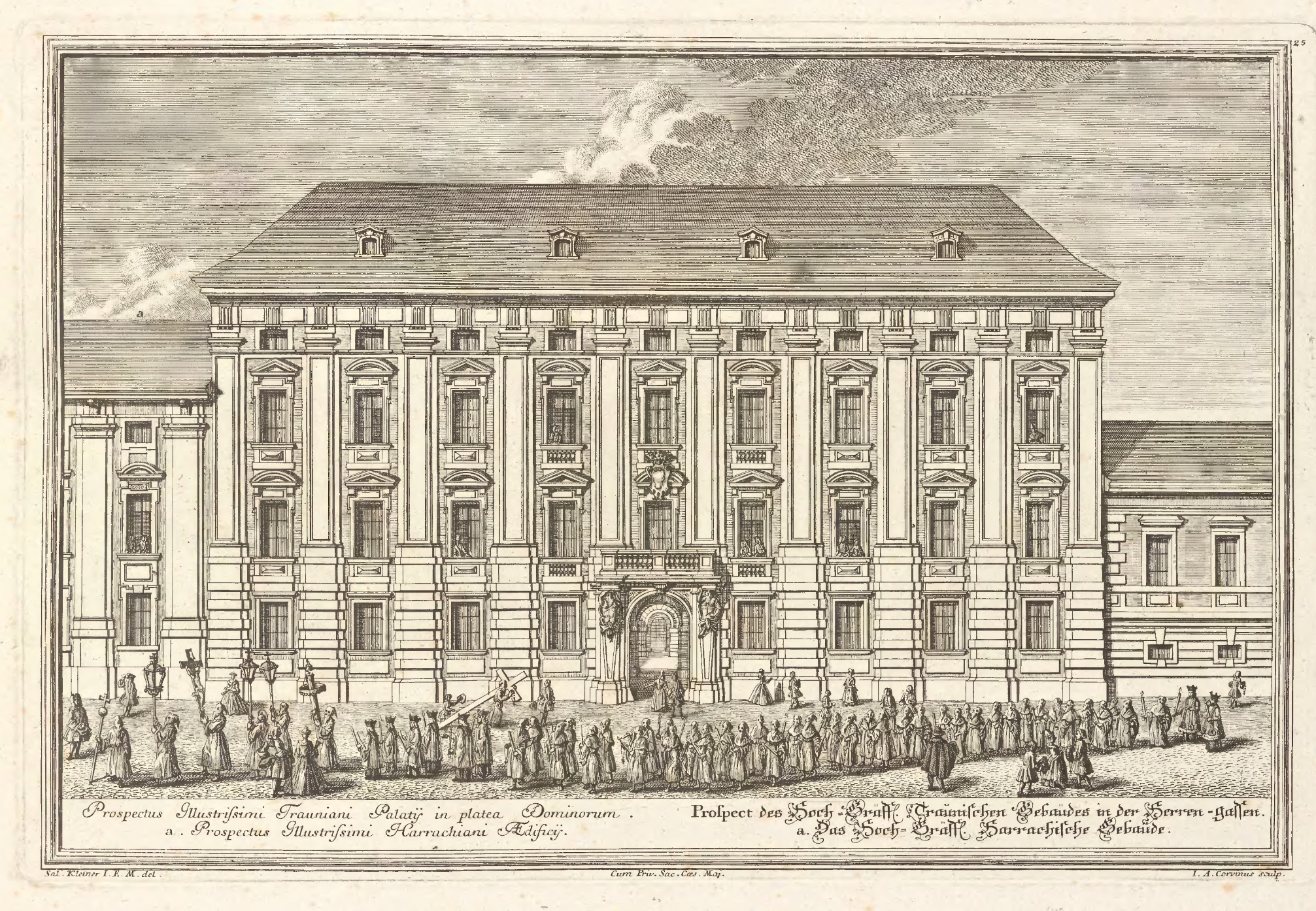
Palais Abensperg-Traun, Herrengasse, Vienna (1401-1855)

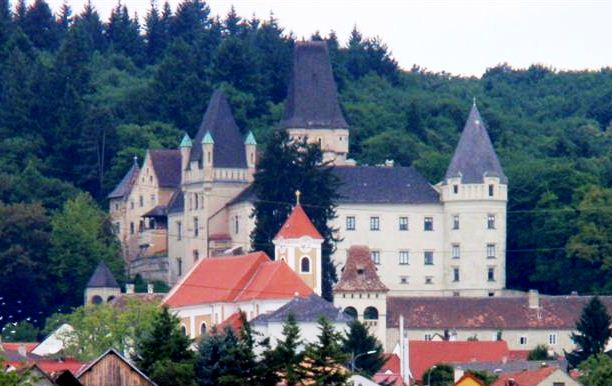
Maissau Castle (owned since 1526)

Petronell Castle (1656-2006)

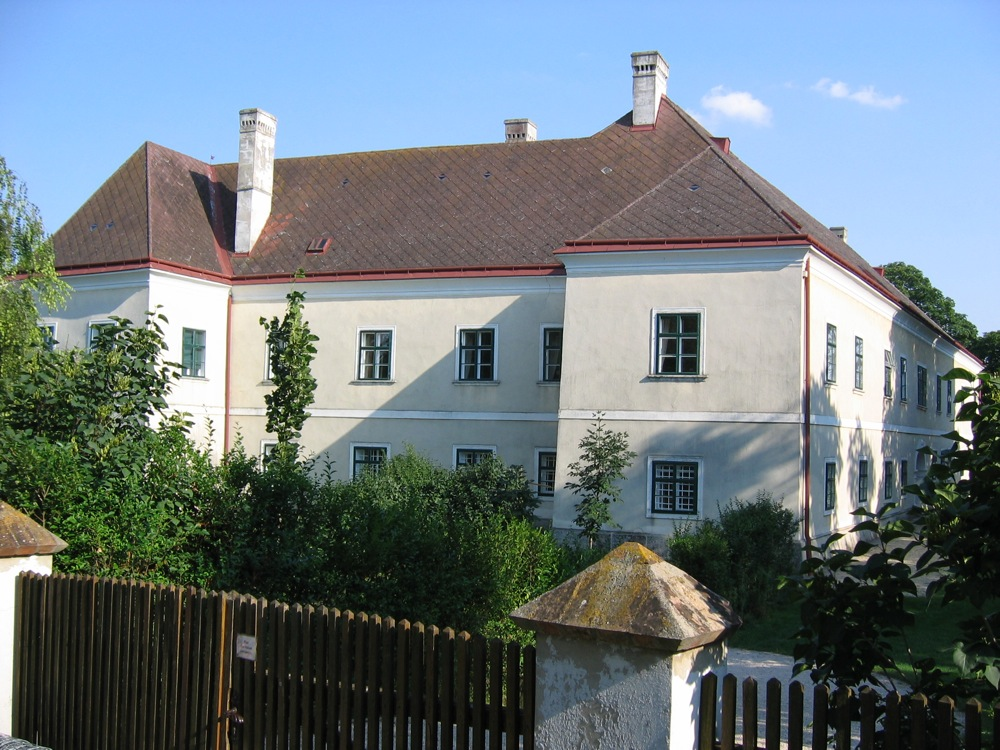
Groß-Schweinbarth Castle (owned since 1661)

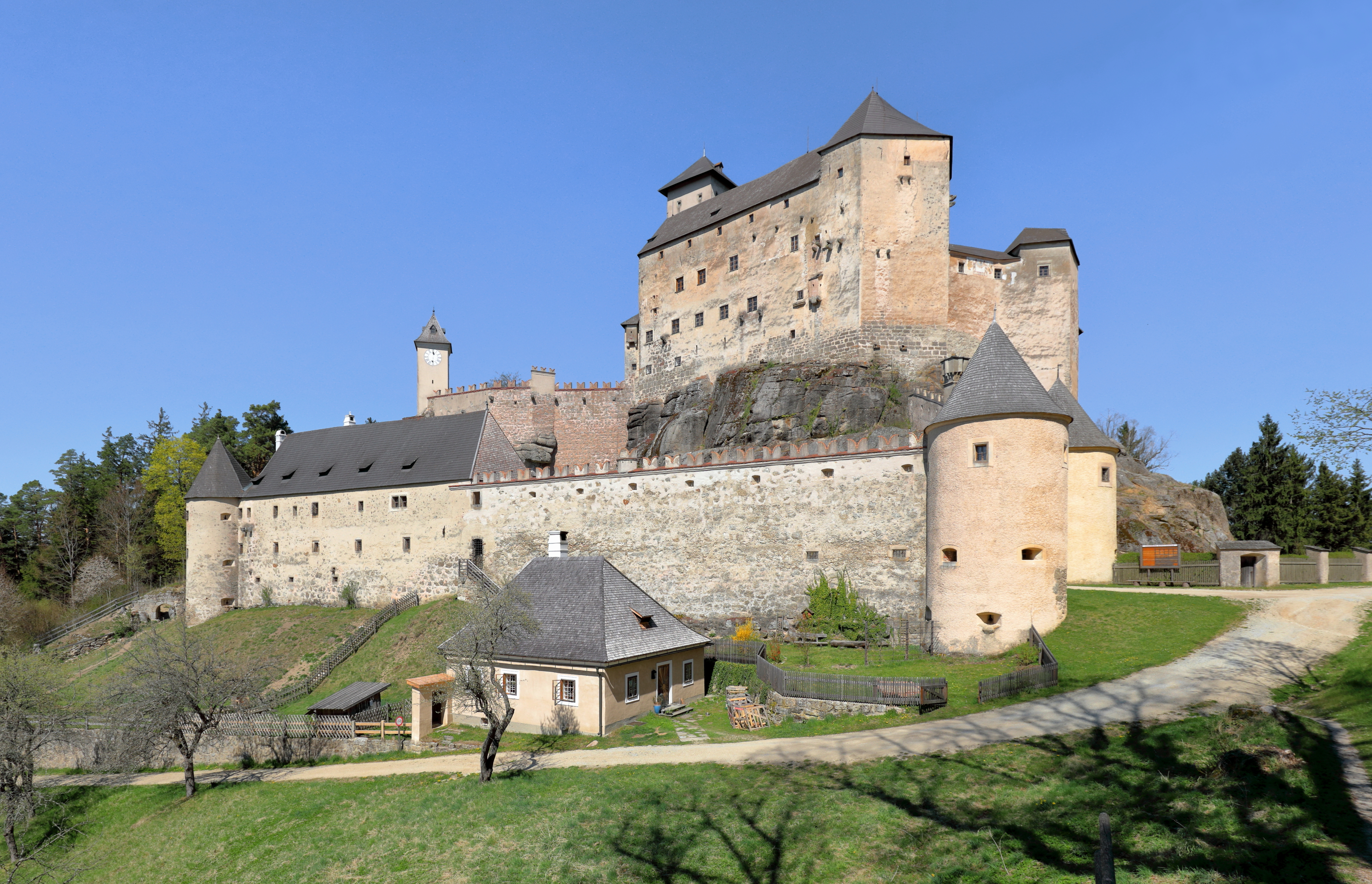
Burg Rappottenstein (owned since 1664)

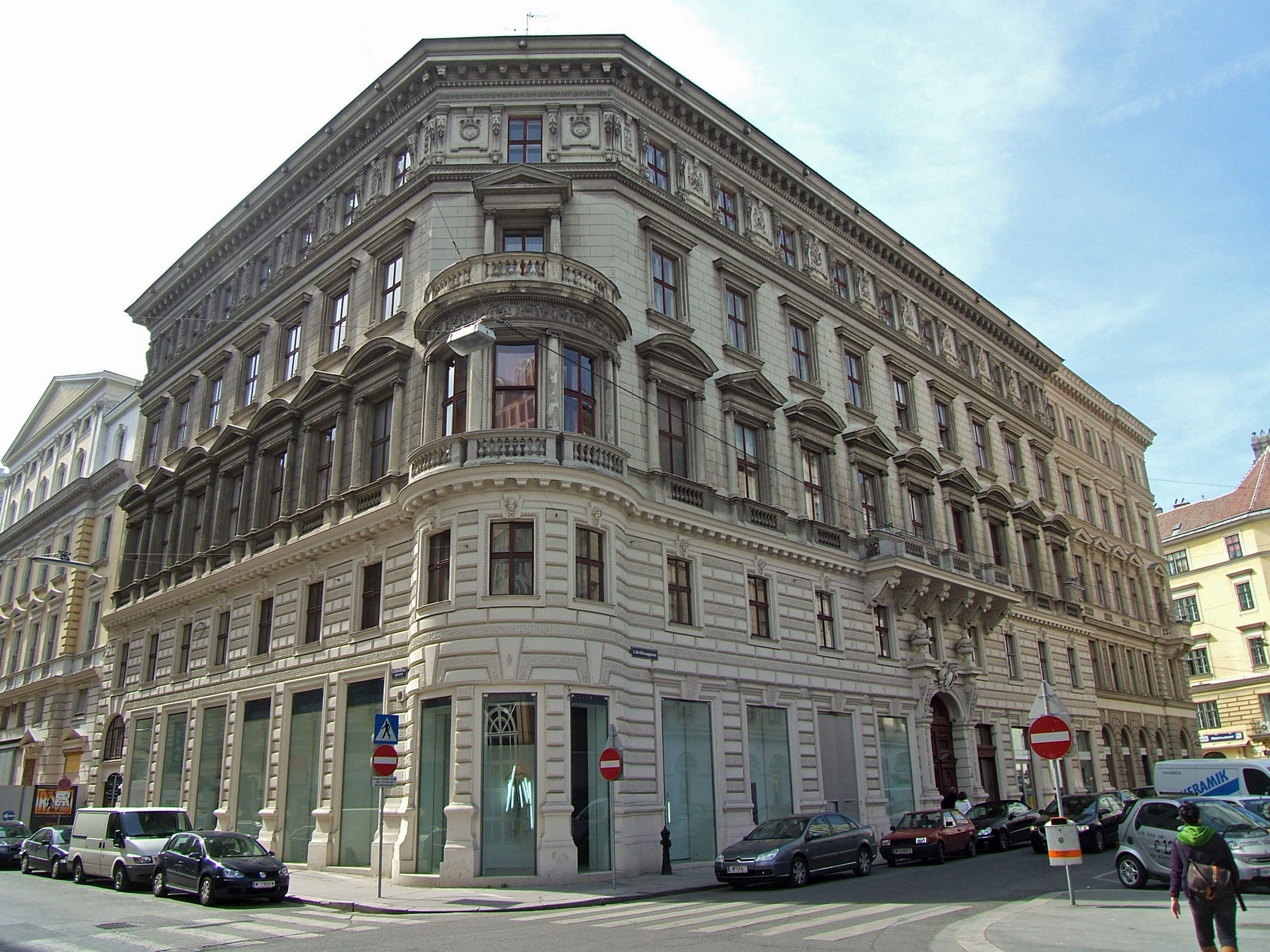
Palais Abensperg-Traun, Weihburggasse, Vienna (owned since 1872)
