= Francisco Stockinger =

Austria-born Brazilian artist

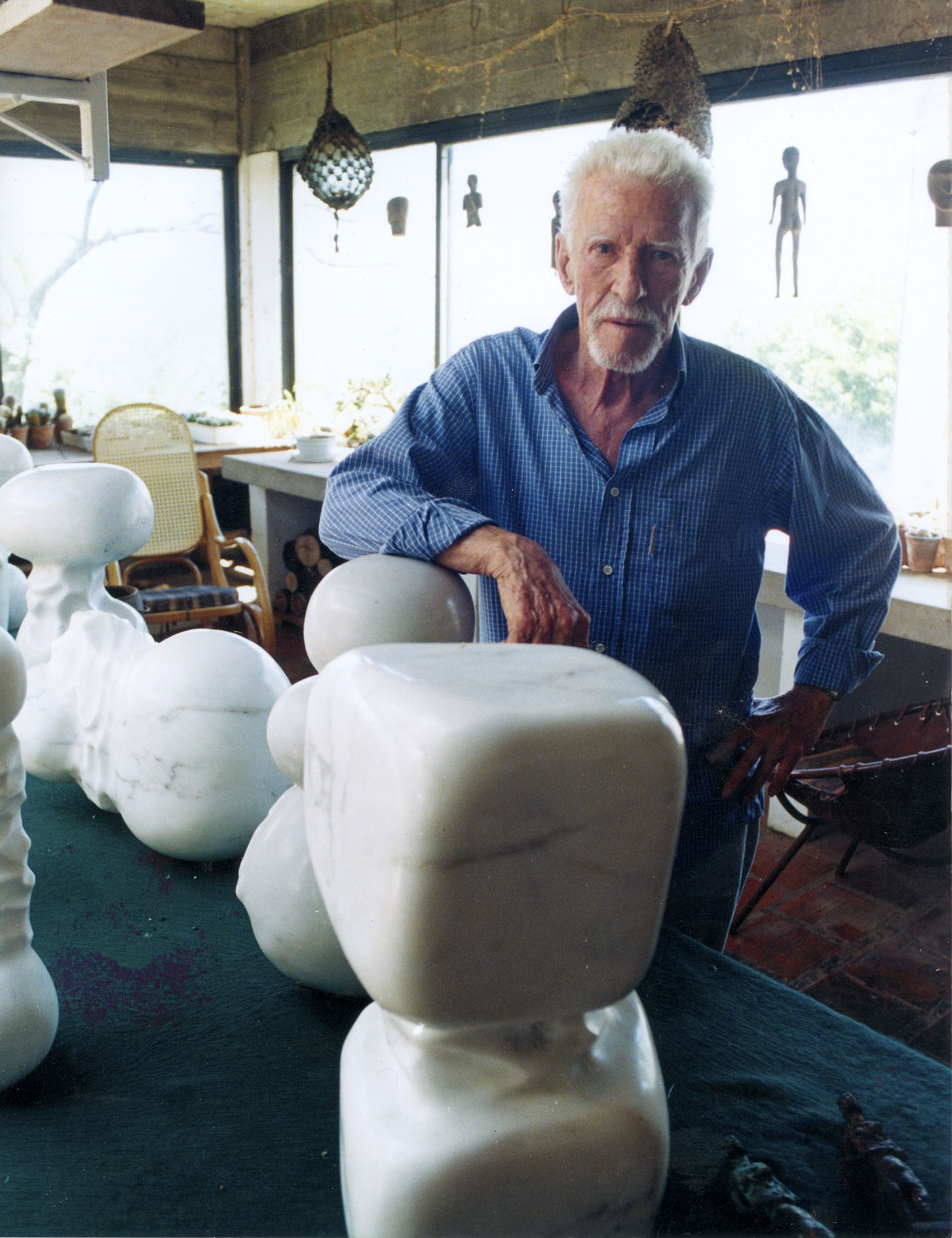
- Stockinger in his studio, 2001
- Born: August 7, 1919; Traun, Austria
- Died: April 12, 2009 (aged 89); Porto Alegre, Brazil
- Known for: Sculpture

Francisco Alexandre Stockinger (August 7, 1919 in Traun, Austria – April 12, 2009 in Porto Alegre, Brazil), also known as Chico Stockinger, was an Austrian artist and naturalized Brazilian. In addition to his sculpture, Stockinger was also an active printmaker, photographer, cartoonist, and graphic artist. Stockinger arrived in Brazil in 1921 and became a resident of São Paulo in 1929. Stockinger was chairman of the Francisco Lisboa Rio Grande do Sul Association for the Visual Arts (Associação Rio-Grandense de Artes Plásticas Francisco Lisboa) from 1957 to 1978.
