= Argenbühl =

- Municipality
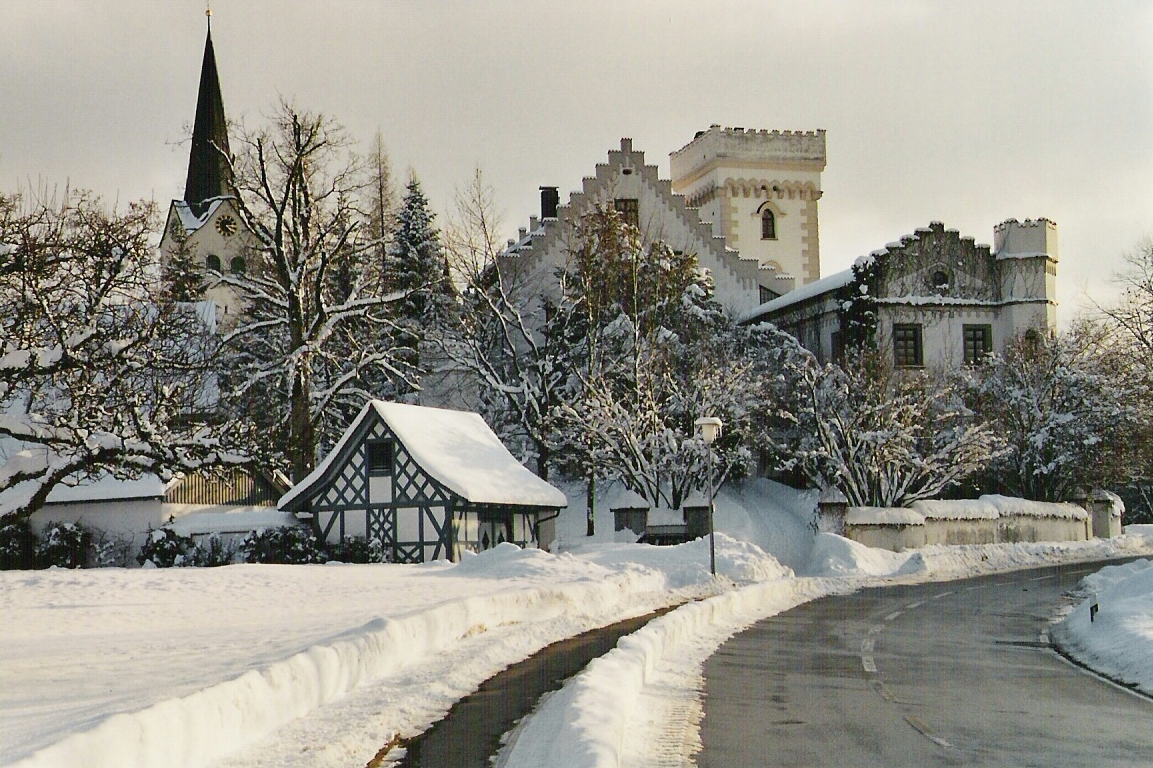
- Ratzenried village in Argenbühl, including the castle of Ratzenried and the tower of the main church

- Coat of arms

- Location of Argenbühl within Ravensburg district
- Interactive map of Argenbühl
- Location within Germany Location within Baden-Württemberg
- Coordinates: 47°41′17″N 09°57′33″E
- Country: Germany
- State: Baden-Württemberg
- Admin. region: Tübingen
- District: Ravensburg

Government
  - Mayor (2023–31): Roland Sauter

Area
  - Total: 76.37 km^{2} (29.49 sq mi)
- Elevation: 681 m (2,234 ft)

Population (2025-12-31)
  - Total: 6,719
  - Density: 87.98/km^{2} (227.9/sq mi)
- Time zone: UTC+01:00 (CET)
  - Summer (DST): UTC+02:00 (CEST)
- Postal codes: 88260
- Dialling codes: 07566
- Vehicle registration: RV
- Website: www.argenbuehl.de

Argenbühl is a municipality in the district of Ravensburg, Baden-Württemberg, Germany.

No actual town or urban settlement is called Argenbühl; rather, the municipality is an administrative amalgamation of several neighbouring villages with different names. The municipal administrative headquarters are located in the village of Eisenharz, with local branch offices also in the villages of Christazhofen, Eglofs, and Ratzenried.

Geographically, it lies in the western part of the Prealpine region of the Allgäu, which in turn is part of the larger geographical region of Swabia in southern Germany. Argenbühl borders the municipalities of Kißlegg and Leutkirch im Allgäu to the north, Wangen im Allgäu to the west, Isny im Allgäu to the east, and the Bavarian municipalities of Hergatz, Heimenkirch, Röthenbach (Allgäu), and Gestratz to the south.

The name comes from the Argen River, whose two main constituent streams delimit part of the municipality's borders, and Bühl, which is a Southern German word for "hill", reflecting the municipality's hilly landscape.

== Geography ==
Argenbühl lies at an altitude from 662 to 761 m (2172 to 2497 ft) AMSL, between the cities of Wangen and Isny.

The municipality includes the following settlements (2006 population data):

- Christazhofen (943 inhabitants, 15.44 km^{2} / 5.96 mi^{2})
- Eglofs (1496 inhabitants, 23.40 km^{2} / 9.03 mi^{2})
- Eisenharz (1446 inhabitants, 13.38 km^{2} / 5.17 mi^{2})
- Göttlishofen (490 inhabitants, 7.22 km^{2} / 2.79 mi^{2})
- Ratzenried (1171 inhabitants, 13.77 km^{2} / 5.32 mi^{2})
- Siggen (171 inhabitants, 3.17 km^{2} / 1.22 mi^{2})

== History ==
The municipality of Argenbühl has existed since 1 January 1972, when the previously independent municipalities of Christazhofen, Eglofs, Eisenharz, Göttlishofen, Ratzenried, and Siggen were merged into the present one. Their history is told in great detail in the Description of the Wangen Administrative District (Beschreibung des Oberamts Wangen), published in 1841. In 1810, all the above-mentioned communities came under the jurisdiction of the Wangen district, which in 1973 became part of the Ravensburg district.

- Christazhofen belonged for centuries to the counts of Trauchburg, and later to the Counts of Waldburg-Zeil und Trauchburg.
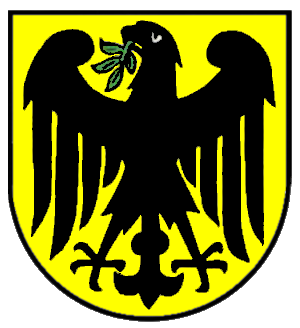
- Eglofs, occasionally mentioned in the historic records also as Meglofs and Megletz, can boast not having been subject to any lord other than the Kaiser for a long time, as it was a reichsfrei territory, the Lordship of Eglofs. In 1661, Eglofs was ceded to the counts of Abensperg and Traun, and in 1804, it was bought by the Princes of Windisch-Grätz. In 1806, Eglofs and its surroundings were mediatised and granted to the Kingdom of Württemberg.
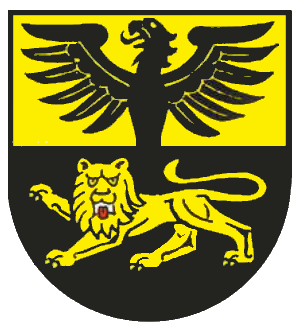
- Eisenharz was bought in 1301 by the stewards of Waldburg and ultimately, like Christazhofen, came to be owned by the lords of Trauchburg.
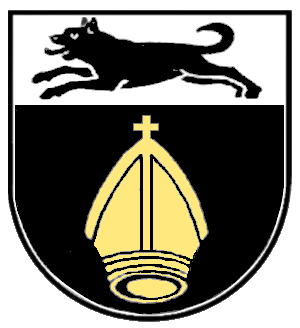
- Göttlishofen came, like Eglofs, to the domain of the House of Windisch-Grätz.
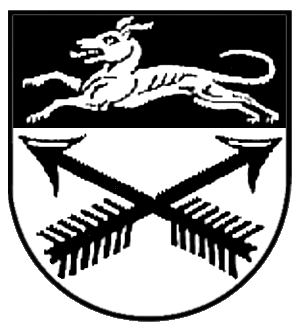
- Siggen was also part of the domain of the House of Windisch-Grätz.
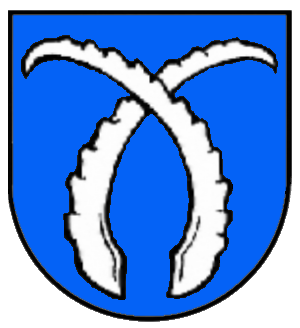
- Ratzenried was once a domain of imperial knights, but the feud became extinct in the 14th century. Afterwards, it had several owners and the settlement was divided for a long time, which is attested by the fact that two castles existed in parallel (one of them, southeast of the village, is today in ruins, while the other, in the centre of the village, as of 2014 hosts the administrative headquarters of the Humboldt-Institut language school organisation). Finally, in 1813, Count Paul Joseph von Beroldingen (1754-1831) inherited Ratzenried. In 1806, the village became part of Bavaria, but only four years later, it was handed over to Württemberg.

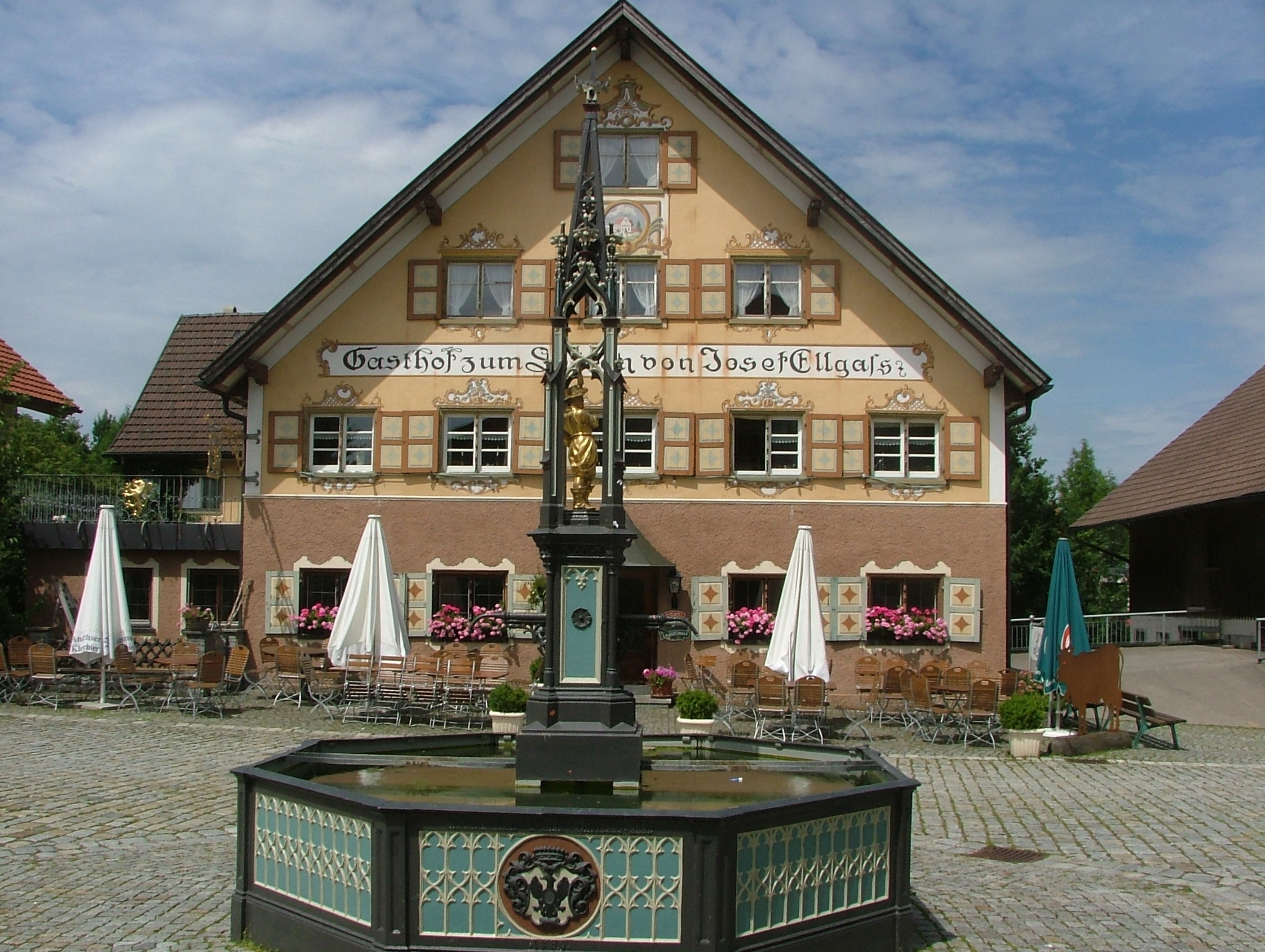
Eglofs

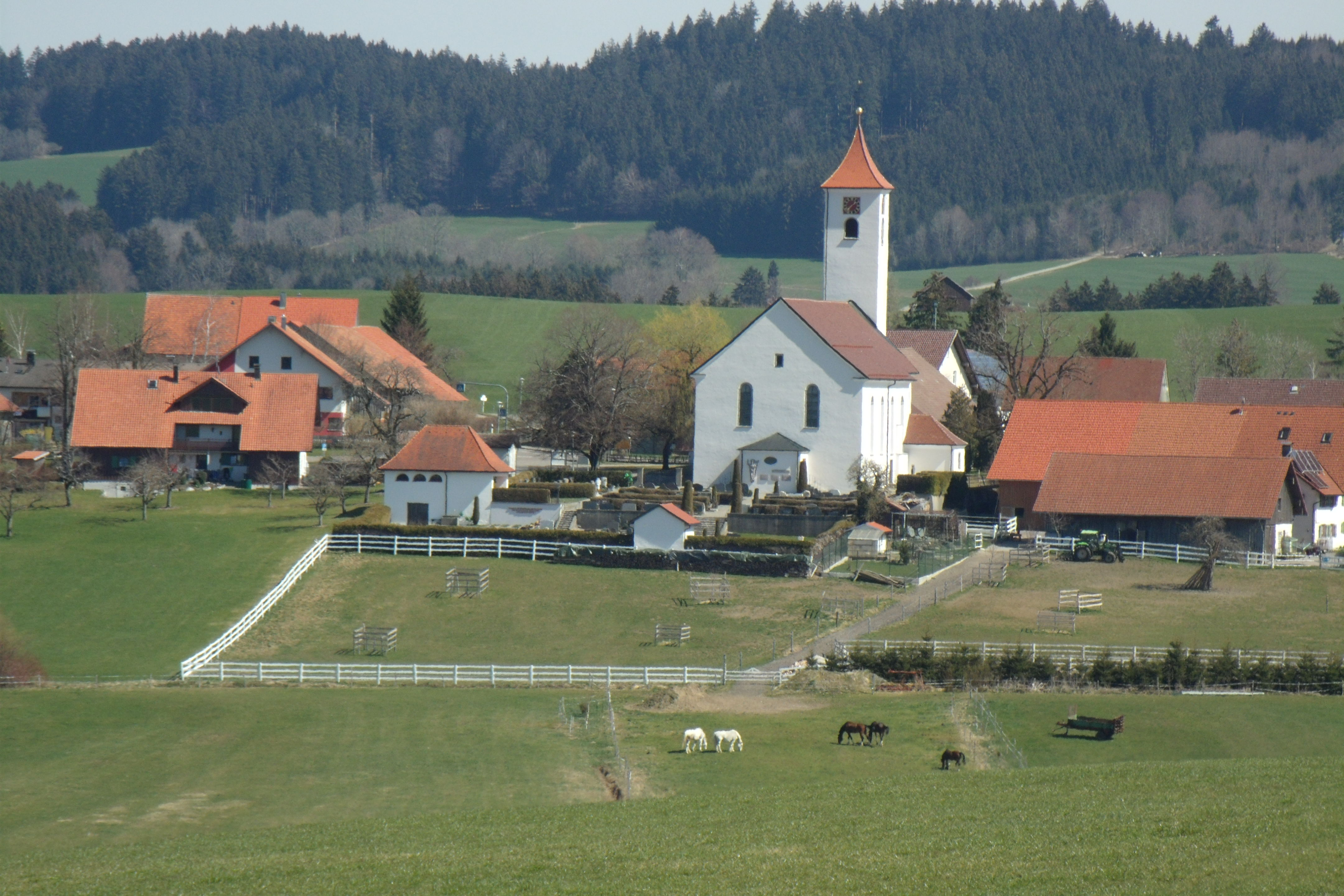
Christazhofen

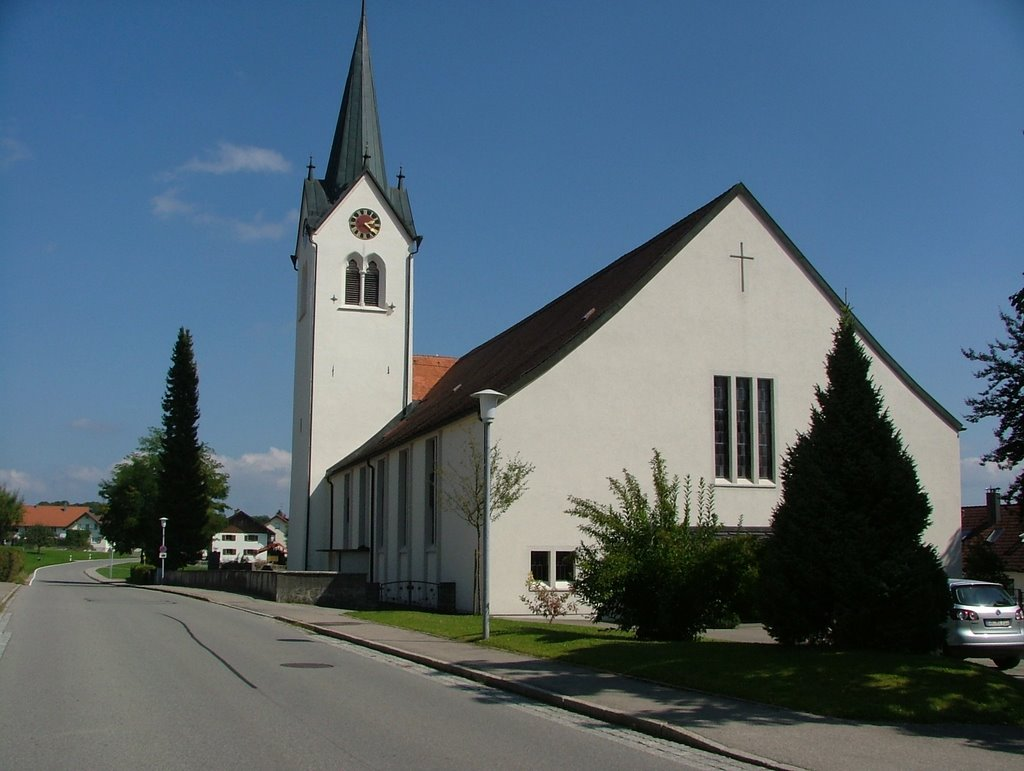
Eisenharz

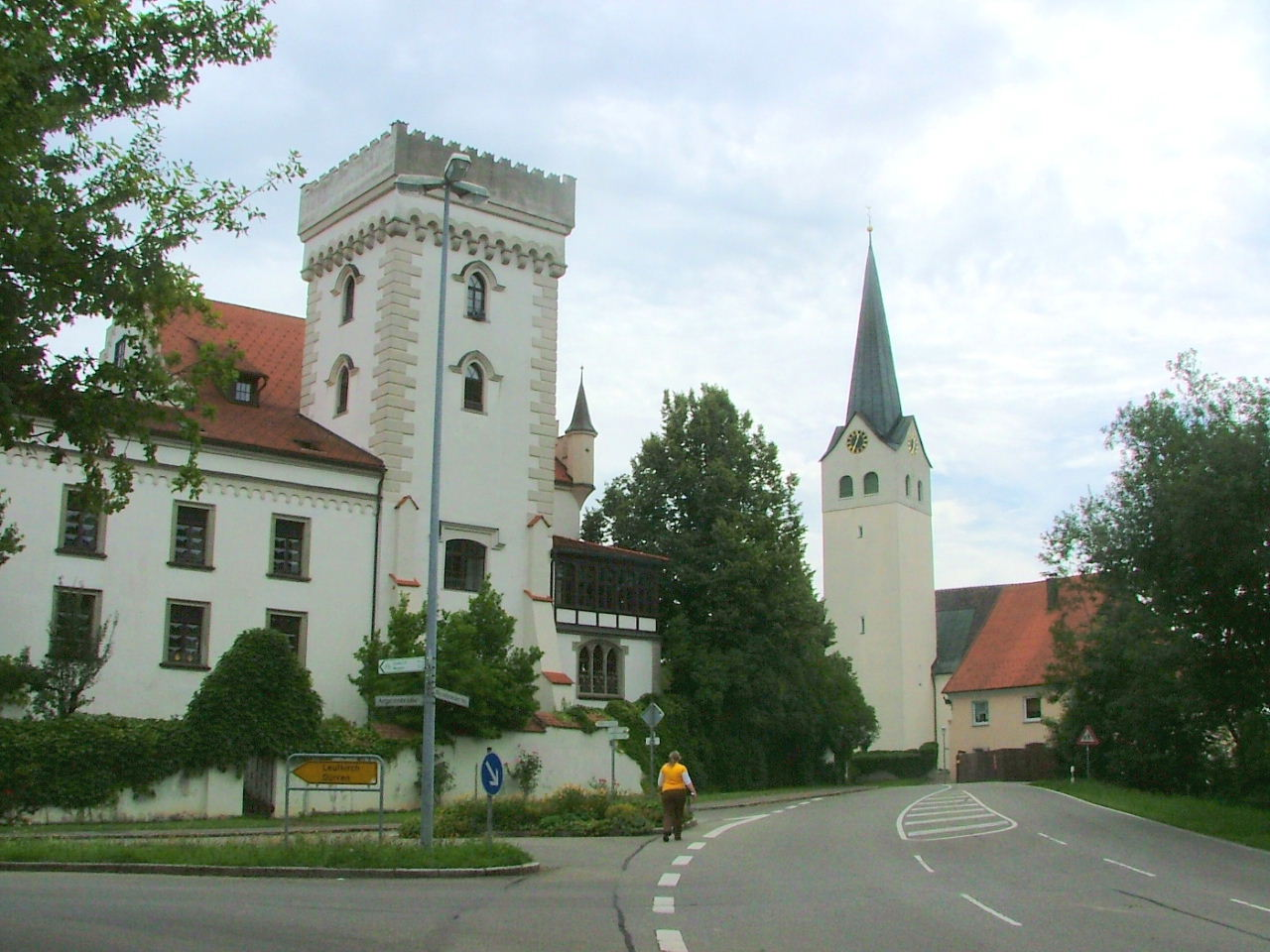
Ratzenried

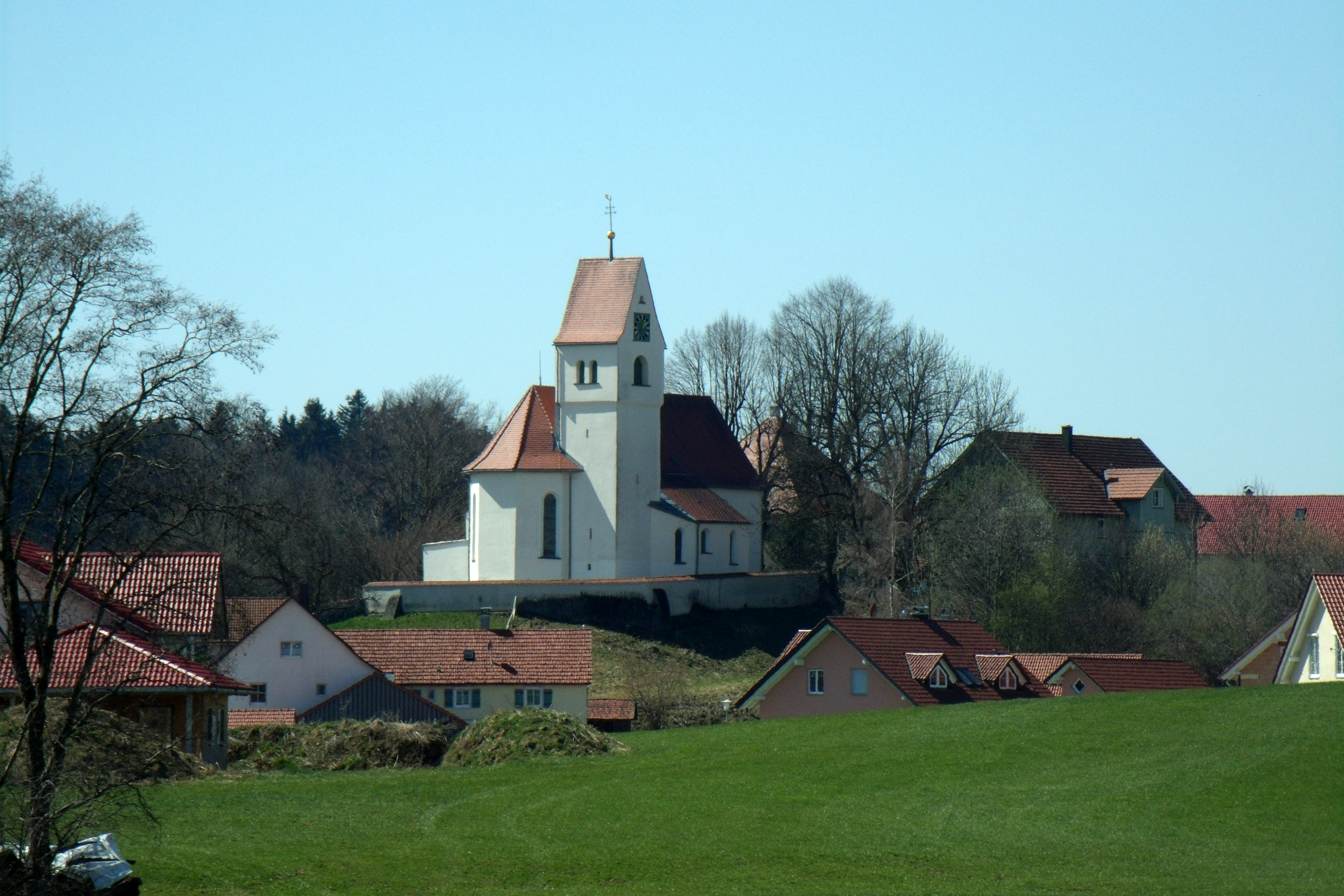
Siggen

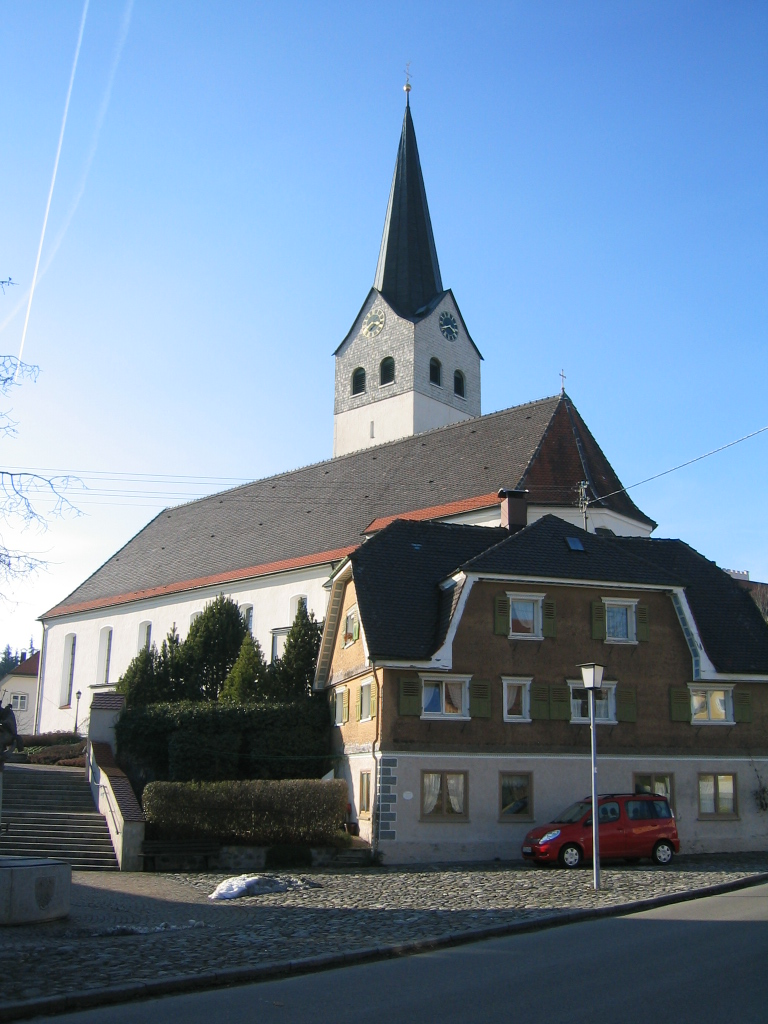
Saint George's church, Ratzenried

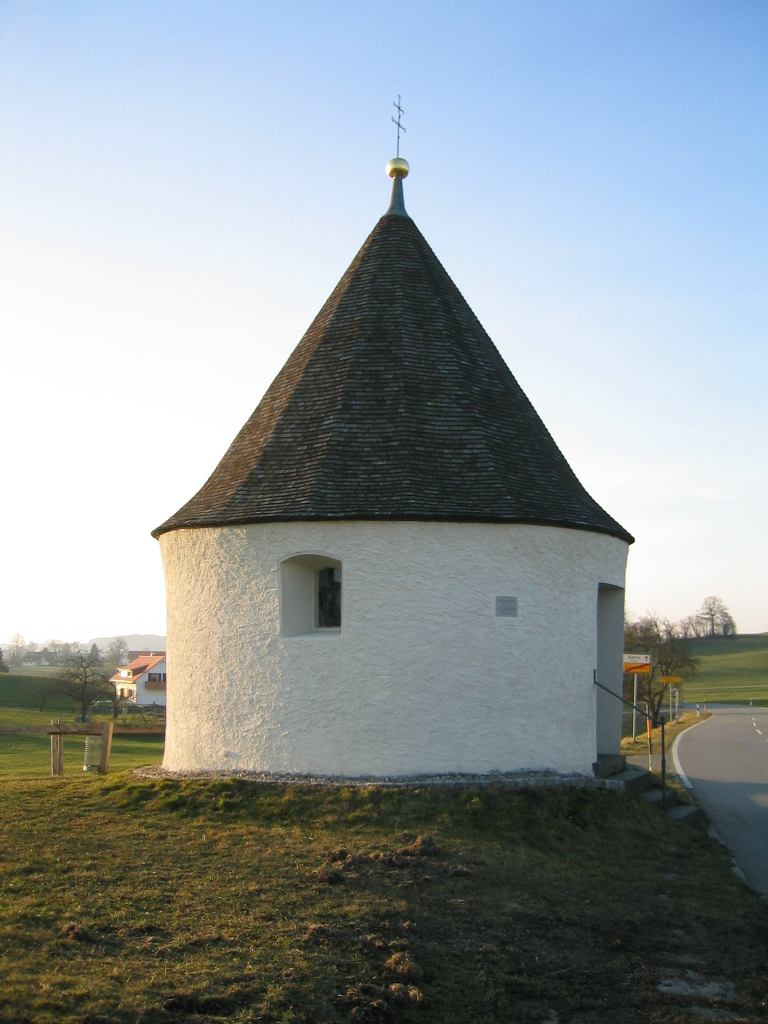
Round Chapel of Eisenharz

== Religion ==
Argenbühl has six Roman Catholic parishes. The region's few Lutheran followers attend their church in nearby Wangen im Allgäu.

== Politics ==
=== Municipal council ===
The election for the municipal council (Gemeinderat) on 7 June 2009 had the following results:

1. CDU 68.6% - 12 seats (-1)
2. Independent 31.4% - 5 seats (+2)

=== Sister towns ===
- Capannoli, Italy
- Cieszanów, Poland
- Berbisdorf (part of Radeburg, Saxony), Germany

== Economy and infrastructure ==
=== Transport ===
The municipality is linked by bus lines to neighbouring cities, such as Leutkirch, Isny, and Wangen. The lines are operated by the Lake Constance-Upper Swabia Local Transport Administration (Bodensee-Oberschwaben Verkehrsverbund), popularly known as bodo. In the past, a stop of the Kißlegg–Hergatz railway branch was in Ratzenried.

=== Education ===
Eglofs and Ratzenried have each an elementary and a general secondary school (Hauptschule) that also works as a Werkrealschule. In Christazhofen and Eisenharz are only elementary schools. Four kindergartens also are in the municipality.

== Culture and sights ==
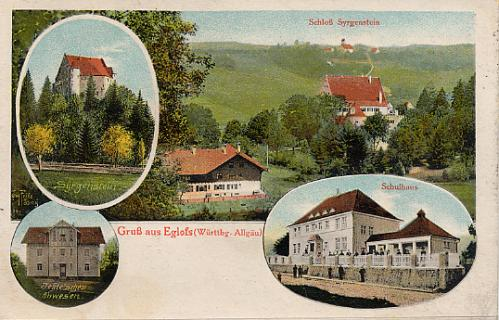
Eglofs around 1900

=== Museums ===
The village of Ratzenried has a local history museum, while Eglofs hosts the Allgäu-Swabian Music Archive (Allgäu-Schwäbische Musikarchiv). In 2009, a museum was also opened in Eisenharz, with exhibits about the history of the place and the local dairy industry of the Wunderlich and Nestlé companies.

=== Notable buildings ===
- The Eglofs Baroque church is part of the Upper Swabian Baroque Route (Oberschwäbische Barockstraße).
- The castle at Ratzenried is the administrative headquarters of the Humboldt-Institut language school conglomerate.
- The Round Chapel of Eisenharz is a medieval chapel that is the destination of a yearly Boxing Day Catholic procession.

== Notable people ==
- Gebhard of Razenried (1583–1652), Jesuit priest, and rector of the Eichstätt Jesuit College from 1621–1631 and 1637 of the Augsburg college
- Konstantin Rösch (1869–1944), theologian
- Anton Kulmus (1900-1989), developer and manufacturer of agricultural vehicles
- Anton Morent (1924–2006), transportation entrepreneur
- Helmut Maucher (1927-2018), former CEO of Nestlé

== See also ==
- Meggen Lawn Cross
