= Burg Rappottenstein =

Castle in Lower Austria

Coordinates: 48°30′43″N 15°05′17″E

- Lower Austria, Austria
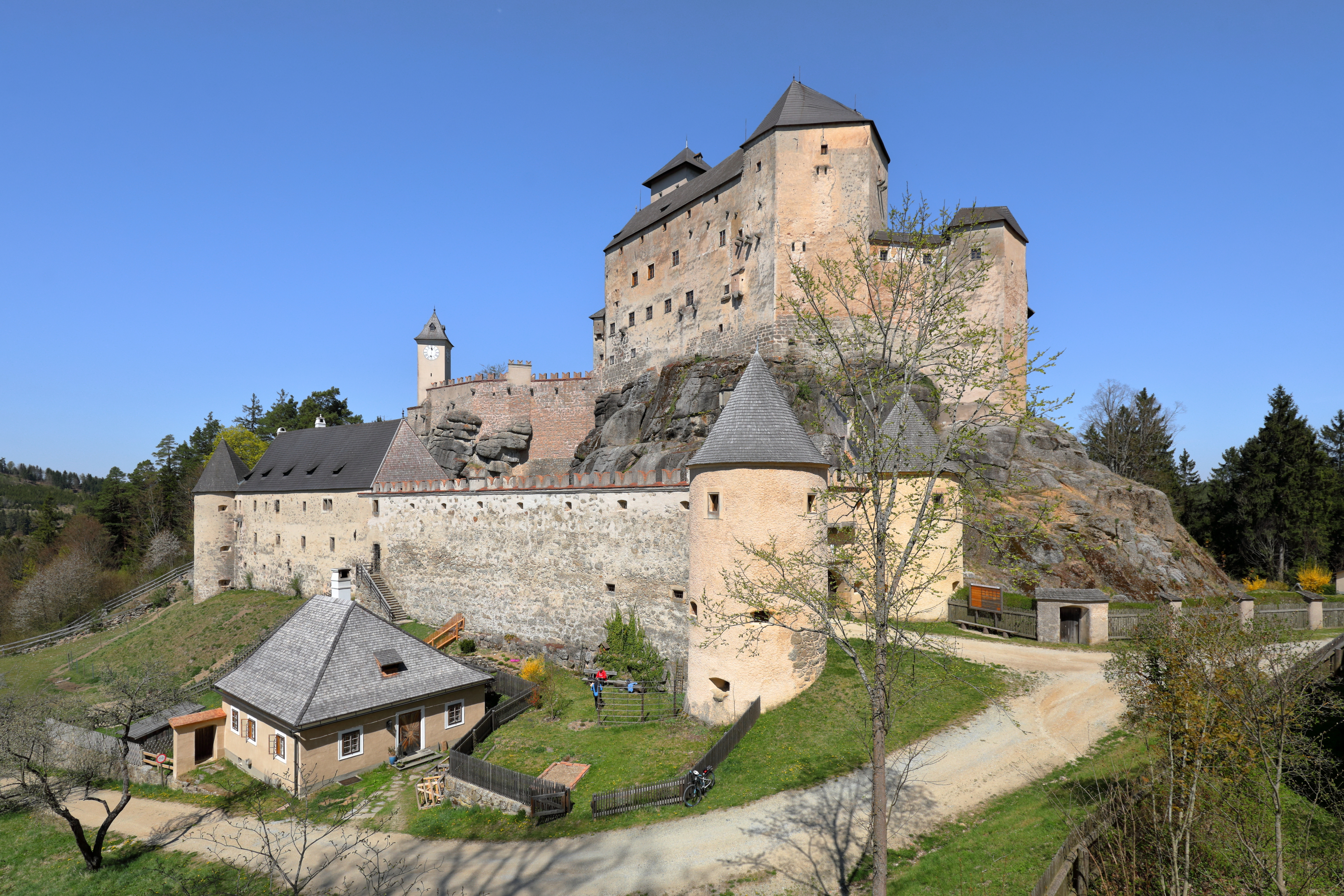

Site information
- Type: Castle

Burg Rappottenstein is a castle in Rappottenstein, Lower Austria, Austria. Burg Rappottenstein is 683 metres (2,241 ft) above sea level.

== See also ==
- List of castles in Austria
