= Oedter See =

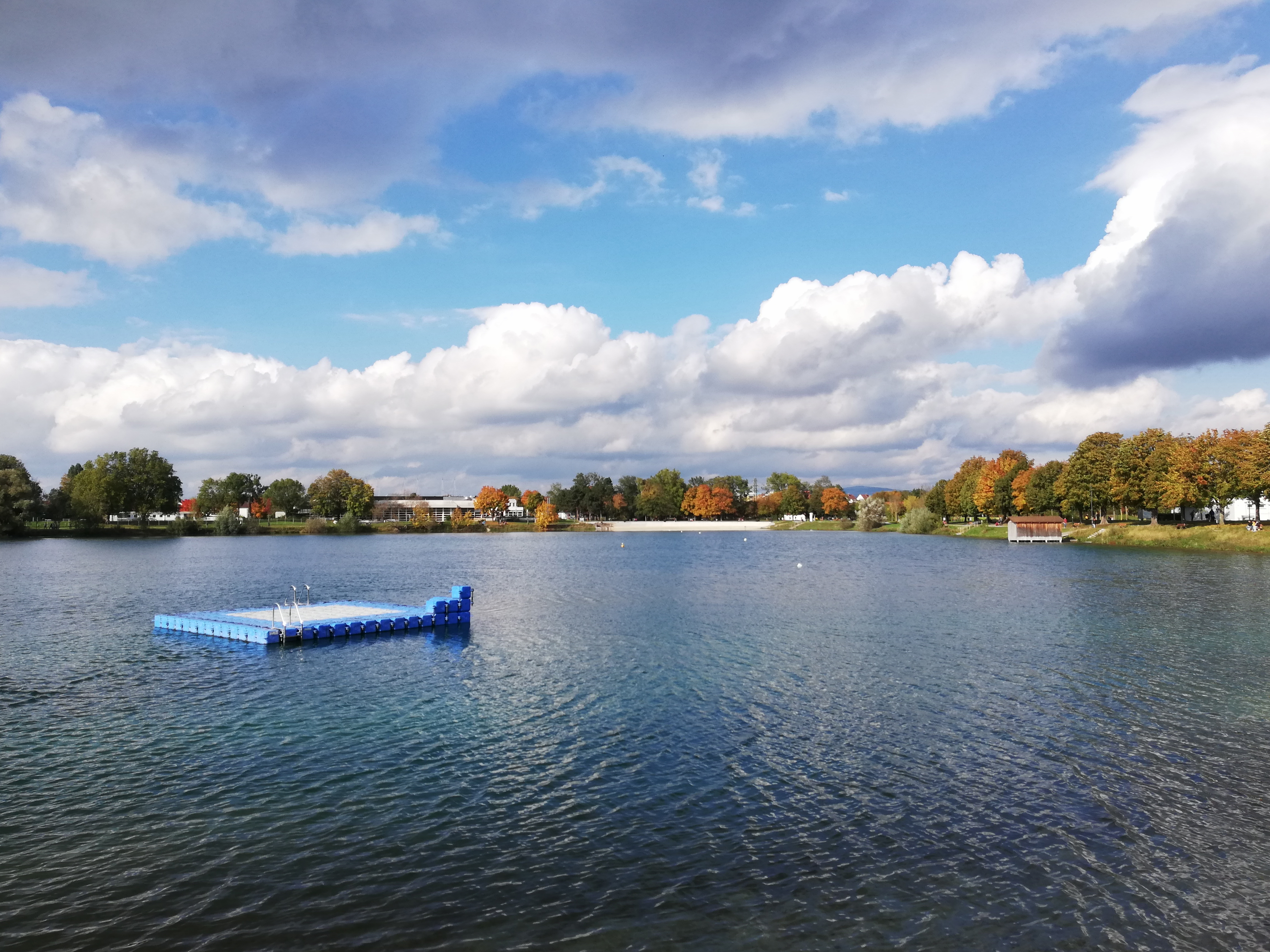

- Location within Austria
- Location: Upper Austria, Austria
- Coordinates: 48°12′44″N 14°13′17″E
- Type: lake

Oedter See is a lake of Upper Austria.
