= Stauff =

Stauff is a German surname. Notable people with the surname include:

- Andreas Stauff (born 1987), German professional road bicycle racer
- Philipp Stauff (1876–1923), German/Austrian journalist and publisher, member of the Thule Society
- Werner Stauff (born 1960), German cyclist
