= Adelegg =

Mountain range in Germany

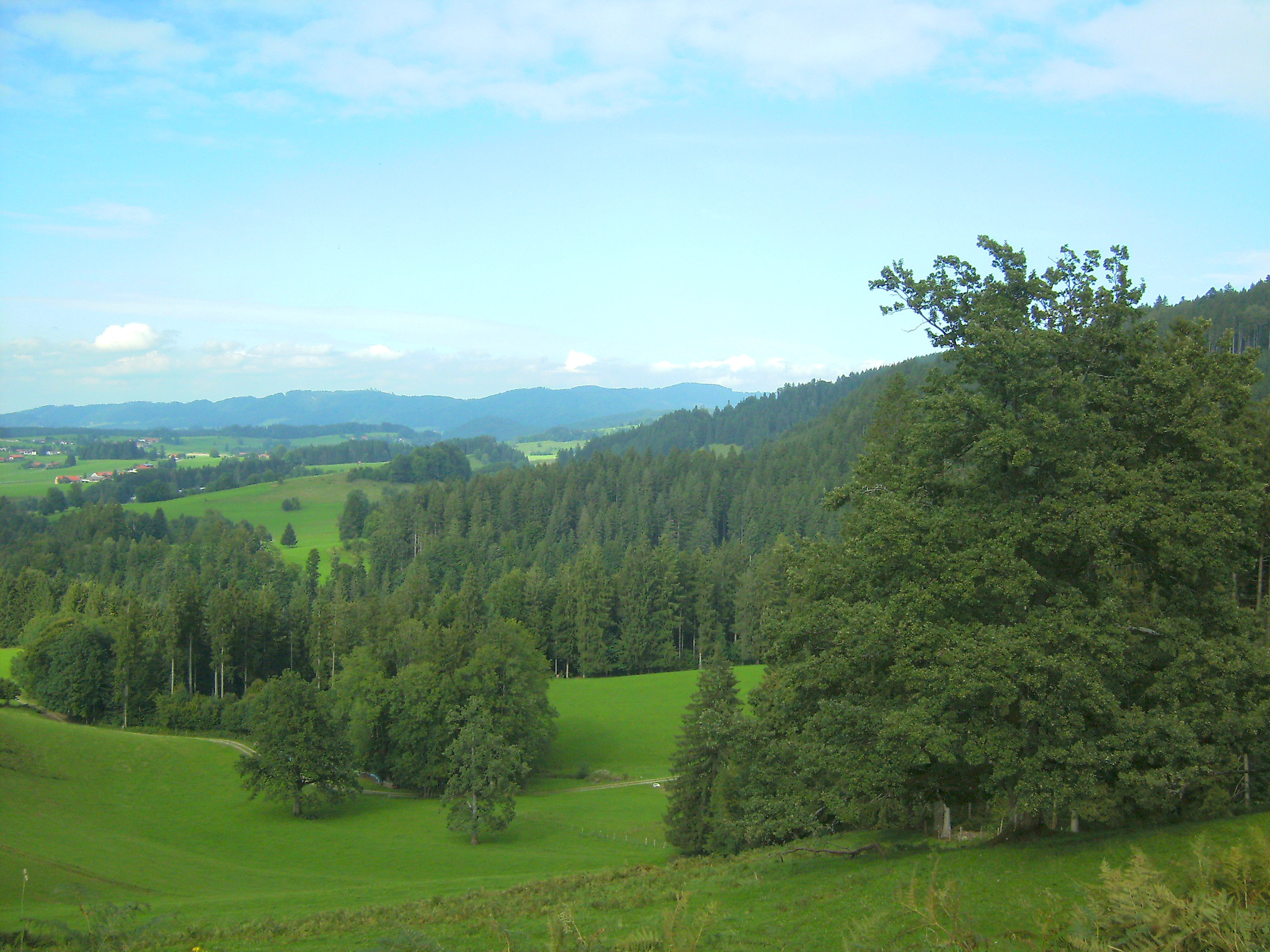
- View from NE slope of the Laubenberg across the Eistobel valley and municipality of Maierhöfen looking NE towards the Adelegg

Highest point
- Peak: Ursersberg
- Elevation: 1,129 m above NN

Dimensions
- Area: 112 km^{2} (43 mi^{2})

Geography
- Location within Baden-Württemberg
- Country: Germany
- States: Baden-Württemberg and Bavaria
- Range coordinates: 47°41′33″N 10°07′32″E
- Parent range: Allgäu Alps

The Adelegg is a forested, mountain range, up to 1,129 m above sea level (NN) and 112 km^{2} in area, which is part of the northern foothills of the Alps, within the Westallgäu in the south German districts of Ravensburg and Oberallgäu.

== Geography ==
=== Location ===
The Adelegg forms the northernmost foothills of the Allgäu Alps in the southeastern part of the Bavarian Alps and extend a long way out into the Alpine Foreland. They lie between the Untere Argen near Isny to the southwest and west, and Leutkirch to the northwest (both in the Baden-Württemberg district of Ravensburg), and between Altusried to the northeast, Wiggensbach to the east, Buchenberg to the southeast and the Wengener Argen near Weitnau to the south (all in the Bavarian district of Oberallgäu).

The name Adelegg is generally only used for that part of the range located in Württemberg, but the landscape unit of the same name also includes the Hohentanne Forest to the north-northeast, the Kürnach Forest to the northeast and the Buchenberg Forest to the east. To the south it is adjoined by the mountain ridge of Sonneck on the far side of the Wengener Argen, which is not however part of the Adelegg landscape unit.

=== Summits ===
The highest mountain of the mountain range Adelegg is Ursersberg which is located in Bavaria. The highest summit of the mountain chain Adelegg is Hohenkapf which is also located in Bavaria. The highest summit of this chain which is located in the federal state of Baden-Württemberg is Schwarzer Grat. It is located only few meters to the northwest of the border with Bavaria and at the same time the highest elevation of the adiminstrative region of Tübingen.

From a topographical point of view, many summits of Adelegg are not to be considered independent peaks. A prominence of only few 10 m and an isolation of only few 100 m is very common. However, neighboring elevations are sometimes separated from one another by one of the numerous, sometimes deeply incised ravines that are characteristic of the Adelegg.

The summits and other elevations, together with their foothills within the Adelegg range, and the landscape unit of Adelegg - which is higher in places - are sorted below by height in metres (m) above sea level (NN); (federal state (FS): BW = Baden-Württemberg; BY = Bavaria):

Summit	Elevation	FS	Subarea	Location	Description/noteworthiness
Ursersberg	1,129.2 m	BY	Kürnacher Wald	1,4 km northwest of Eschach (Buchenberg)	highest mountain of the mountain range Adelegg
Hauptmannsberg	1,129.1 m	BY	Kürnacher Wald	0,8 km west of Ursersberg	subordiante to the slightly higher Ursersberg, with an isolation of only 18 m; location of Große Schwedenschanze
Änger	1,123 m	BY	Kürnacher Wald	3 km east of Kreuzthal	
Hohenkapf	1,121 m	BY	Buchenberger Wald, mountain range Adelegg	2,3 km southwest of Eschach	highest mountain of the mountain range Adelegg
Schwarzer Grat	1,118.5 m	BW	Buchenberger Wald, mountain range Adelegg	2,3 km northwest of Wengen (Weitnau)	highest mountain of the mountain chain Adelegg and highest point of the adiminstrative region of Tübingen; observation tower
Kreuzleshöhe	1,115 m	BY	Kürnacher Wald	0,7 km north of Änger	scenic view point with cross, 300 m west of the summit which is located in a wooded area
Dürrer Bühl	1,077 m	BY		2,3 km southwest of the village of Wiggensbach	highest summit of northern Adelegg
Blender	1,071 m	BY		0,9 km east of Dürrer Bühl	subpeak of Dürrer Bühl; location of communication tower Blender
namless peak	961 m	BY	Hohentanner Wald	2,2 km west-southwest of Walzlings (Kimratshofen)	highest summit of Hohentanner Wald
Rote Fluh	1,090 m	BW	Buchenberger Wald, mountain range Adelegg	1 km northeast of Schwarzer Grat	de facto not a peak, but a commercial forest area
Schönbühl	1,074.8 m	BW	Buchenberger Wald, mountain range Adelegg	400 m north-northwest of Schwarzer Grat	
Raggenhorn	1,056.2 m	BY	Buchenberger Wald, mountain range Adelegg	1,4 km north-northwest of Wengen	scenic view point with summit cross
Hohkopf	1,035.2 m	BW	Buchenberger Wald, mountain range Adelegg	2,3 km east-southeast of Ratzenhofen (Isny im Allgäu)	
Wegmannshöhe	1,031.8 m	BW	Buchenberger Wald, mountain range Adelegg	2,4 km east of Ratzenhofen	
Ochsenkapf	1,011.7 m	BW	Buchenberger Wald, mountain range Adelegg	1,8 km east-southeast of Ratzenhofen	
Steinbergele	1,009.2 m	BW	Buchenberger Wald, mountain range Adelegg	2 km southeast of Rohrdorf	
Schafberg	1,008.9 m	BW	Buchenberger Wald, mountain range Adelegg	900 m south of Eisenbach ((Isny im Allgäu))	
Rudershöhe	999.2 m	BW	Buchenberger Wald, mountain range Adelegg	2,3 km südöstlich von Rohrdorf	
Ölberg	961.8 m	BW	Buchenberger Wald, mountain range Adelegg	1,5 km östlich von Rohrdorf	
Walkenberg	952 m	BY	Hohentanner Wald	0,8 km east of the village of Walkenberg (Altusried)	location of a Schwedenschanze
Herrenberg	931.2 m	BW	Buchenberger Wald, mountain range Adelegg	1,8 km northeast of Rohrdorf	
Bärenbühl	930.5 m	BW	Buchenberger Wald, mountain range Adelegg	1,2 km northeast of Rohrdorf	slight elevation with a prominence of only 4 m
Heidenkapf	918.2 m	BW	Buchenberger Wald, mountain range Adelegg	800 m north-northeast of Rohrdorf	
Kapf	885.7 m	BW	Buchenberger Wald, mountain range Adelegg	1 km west-southwest of Schmidsfelden (Leutkirch im Allgäu)	

=== Waterbodies and watersheds ===
The Eschach rises in the Buchenberg Forest that adjoins the Adelegg range and runs along the northeastern edge of the range in a mainly northwesterly direction before discharging into the Aitrach, whose waters make their way into the Danube via the northwards running Iller. At the southeastern end of the range is the little pond of Eschacher Weiher which, despite the name, is not connected to the Eschach. The Wengener Argen flows past the Adelegg to the south in an east-west direction and empties into the Untere Argen that runs past the southwestern end of the mountains from southeast to northwest, before its waters flow into Lake Constance and thence into the Rhine. The Adelegg is thus on the Rhine-Danube Watershed.

== Nature reserves ==
Small areas of the Adelegg range, totalling 6.4 km^{2} in area, belong to the Adelegg Special Area of Conservation Region (No. 8326-341). Large parts lie in the protected area of Adelegg and Associated Tertiary Hill Foreland (Adelegg und zugehöriges tertiäres Hügelvorland) (LSG No. 319441), which covers 68.14 km^{2} and was founded on 31 March 1994.

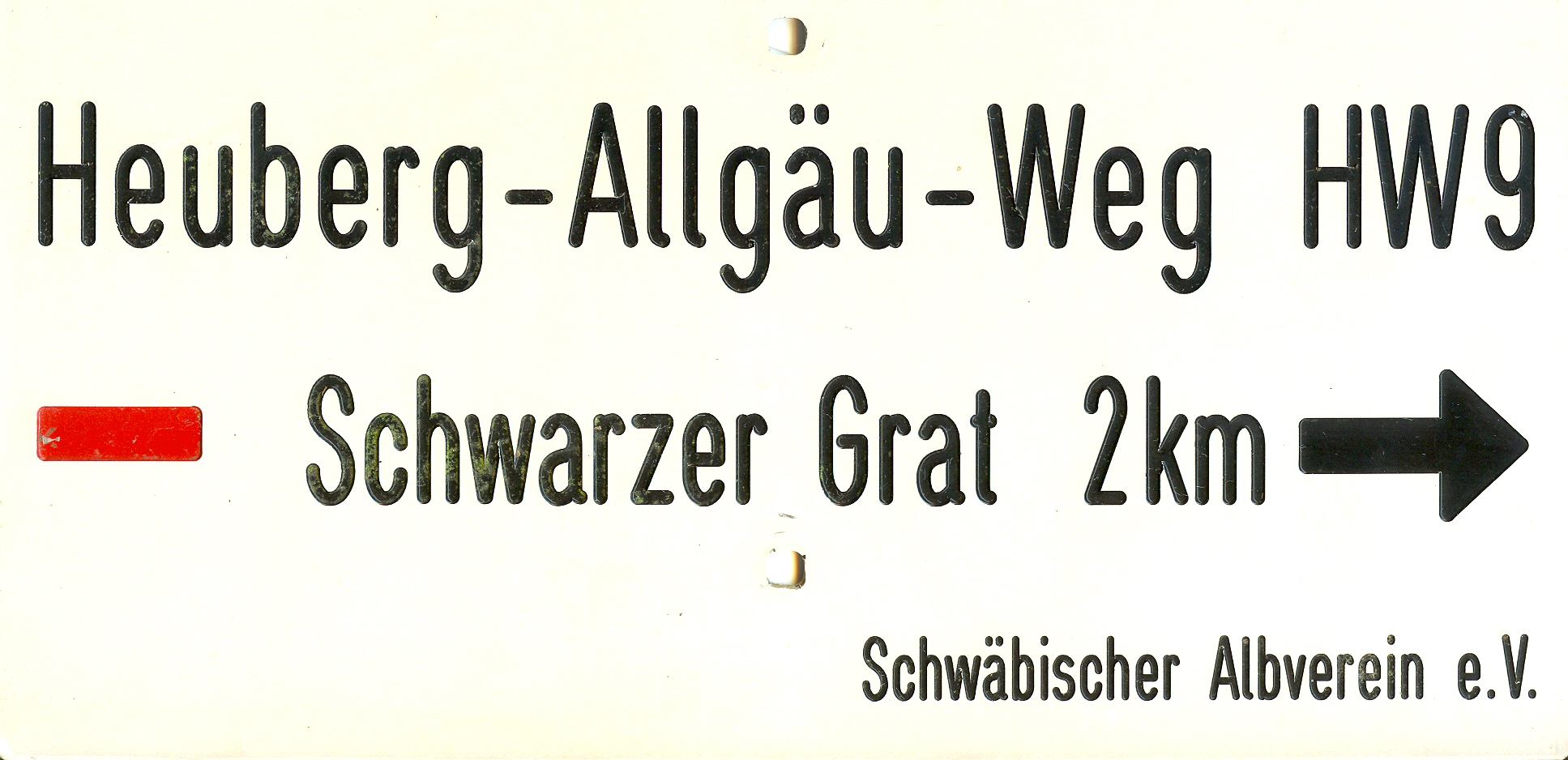
Signpost in the Adelegg

== Economy and tourism ==
The Adelegg is used primarily for forestry and tourism. In the Modern Era, but possibly also in the Late Middle Ages, there were various glassworks here; one that may still be visited in the glassworks in the former glassmaking village of Schmidsfelden.

Hiking across the Adelegg is possible on the 320 km long Black Forest-Swabian Jura-Allgäu Way and the 185 km long Heuberg-Allgäu Way. There are also winter sports facilities, especially in the Buchenberg Forest area.

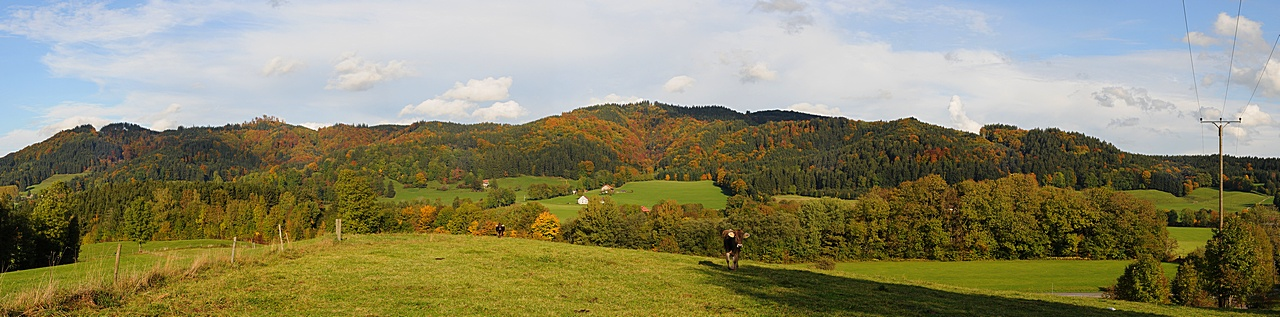
The Adelegg in autumn. View from the west of Isny-Kleinholzleute and the valley of the Untere Argen

== Sources ==
- Rudi Holzberger, Manfred Thierer: Die Adelegg, Das dunkle Herz des Allgäus, Wanderungen und Streifzüge 2009, ISBN 978-3-933614-50-6.
