= Schwarzer Grat =

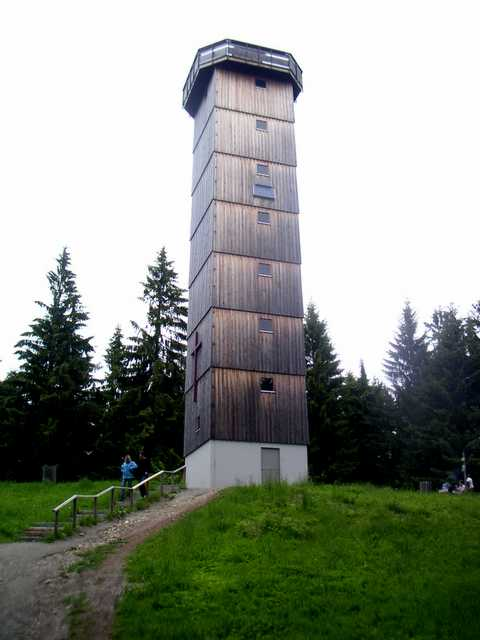
- The Schwarzer Grat Tower, an observation tower on the Schwarzer Grat

Highest point
- Elevation: 1,118 m (3,668 ft)
- Coordinates: 47°42′N 10°7′E

Geography
- Location within Alps
- Location: Baden-Württemberg, Germany

The Schwarze Grat between Eschachthal in the Bavarian county of Oberallgäu and Bolsternang in the Baden-Württemberg county of Ravensburg is 1,118 m above sea level (NHN) and thus the highest mountain in Ravensburg, in the province of Tübingen (Baden-Württemberg) and the Adelegg range, although within the Adelegg region it is topped by the Ursersberg (1,129 m). An observation tower, the Schwarzer Grat Tower stands at the summit.

== Geography ==
=== Location ===
The Schwarzer Grat stands in the southeast of Baden-Württemberg and belongs to the small mountain range of Adelegg, which is roughly north of the Allgäu Alps and extends far into the northern Alpine Foreland. The boundary with Bavaria and the county of Oberallgäu runs just under 300 metres southeast of the top. The summit rises 1.8 km south-southwest of Eschachthal, a village in the Bavarian municipality of Weitnau, and 2.3 km (as the crow flies) north-northeast of Bolsternang, a village in the Württemberg municipality of Isny im Allgäu.

Around 950 metres south-southeast of the top of the Schwarzer Grat on the state border rises the peak of the Raggenhorn (1,056.2 m); beyond that is the Weitnau village of Wengen (Bavaria). Southeast and below the Schwarzer Grat, on the slopes of the Raggenhorns, lies the Wenger Eggalm (also Wengener Egg Alpe or Alpe Wenger Egg), a mountain pasture.

To the east the slopes of the Schwarzer Grat descend to the little stream of Rotenbach, a southwestern tributary of the Eschach, which flows to the north of the mountain. On the southwestern flank is the source of the Eisenbacher Tobel which flows roughly north and empties into the Eisenbach before also joining the Eschach. On the southern flank of the mountain rises the little Scheidach, a northeastern tributary of the Wengener Argen in the catchment area of the Untere Argen.

== Literature ==
- Helber et al.: Isnyer Heimatkunde, Eigenverlag der Stadt Isny im Allgäu, 1st edn., 1990
- Helber: Über die Adelegg – Beiträge zur Geologie, Geschichte, Landwirtschaft und Forstwirtschaft der Adelegg, self-published by the author, 1985
