= Kürnach (Eschach) =

River in Germany

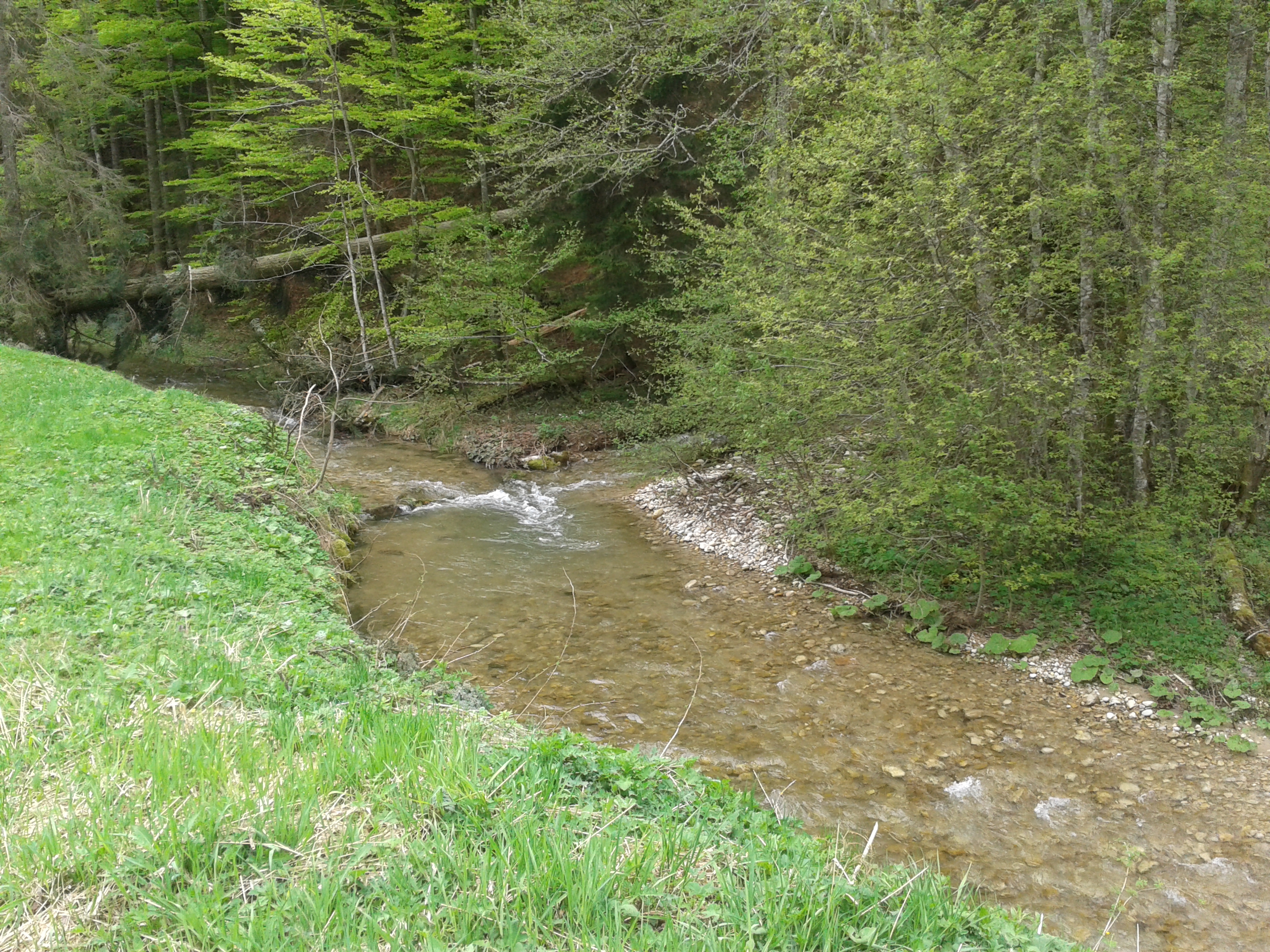
- Confluence of the Große Goldach and the Kürnach at Oberkürnach

Location
- Country: Germany
- State: Bavaria

Physical characteristics
- Mouth
  - location: Eschach
  - coordinates: 47.7525°N 10.1162°E
- Length: 10.9 km (6.8 mi)

Basin features
- Progression: Eschach→ Aitrach→ Iller→ Danube→ Black Sea

Kürnach is a river of Bavaria, Germany. It is a right tributary of the Eschach west of Wiggensbach.

== See also ==
- List of rivers of Bavaria
