= Aregon =

Ancient Greek artist

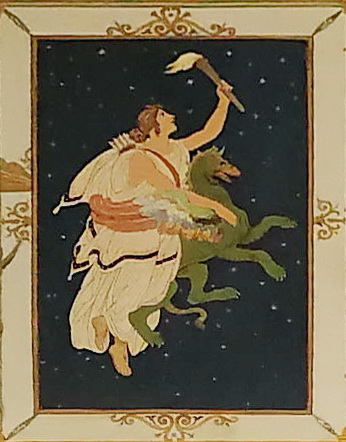
19th-century reconstruction of Aregon's painting of Artemis by Johann Georg Hiltensperger (fresco in Hermitage)

Aregon (Ancient Greek: Ἀρήγων) was a painter from Corinth in ancient Greece, who, in conjunction with a "Cleanthes", ornamented the temple of Artemis Alpheionia at the mouth of the Alpheius river in Elis.

Aregon is known to have painted Artemis riding on a griffin.

If Cleanthes was the same artist who was mentioned by Pliny the Elder, Aregon must be placed at the very earliest period of the rise of art in Greece.
