= Rot (Wurzacher Ach) =

River in Baden-Württemberg, Germany

Location
- Country: Germany
- State: Baden-Württemberg

Physical characteristics
- Mouth
  - location: Wurzacher Ach
  - coordinates: 47.8583°N 9.9293°E
- Length: 12.0 km (7.5 mi)

Basin features
- Progression: Wurzacher Ach→ Aitrach→ Iller→ Danube→ Black Sea

Rot is a river of Baden-Württemberg, Germany. It flows into the Wurzacher Ach west of Leutkirch im Allgäu.

== See also ==
- List of rivers of Baden-Württemberg
