= Waltrams =

Coordinates: 47°38′N 10°10′E

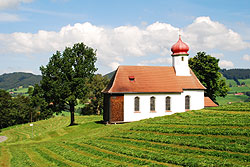

Waltrams is a village located outside the town of Weitnau, in the Oberallgäu district of Bavaria, Germany.
