= Hohenkapf =

Mountain of Bavaria, Germany

Coordinates: 47°41′26″N 10°10′47″E

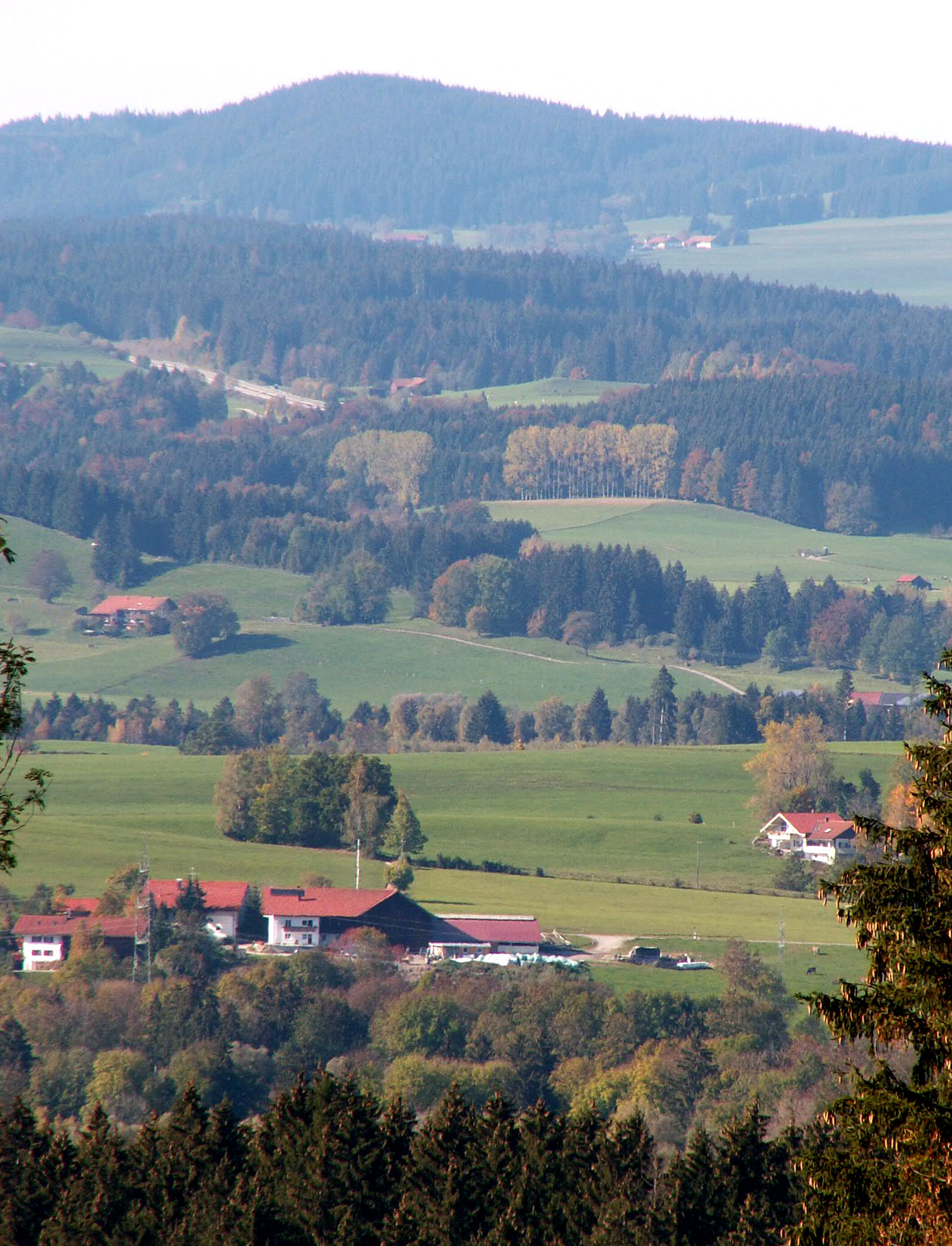

Highest point
- Elevation: 1,121.1 m (3,678 ft)

Geography
- Location: Bavaria, Germany

Hohenkapf is a mountain in the Buchenberg Forest in the Swabian district of Oberallgäu in Bavaria, Germany.
