= Cleanthes (artist) =

Greek painter from Corinth

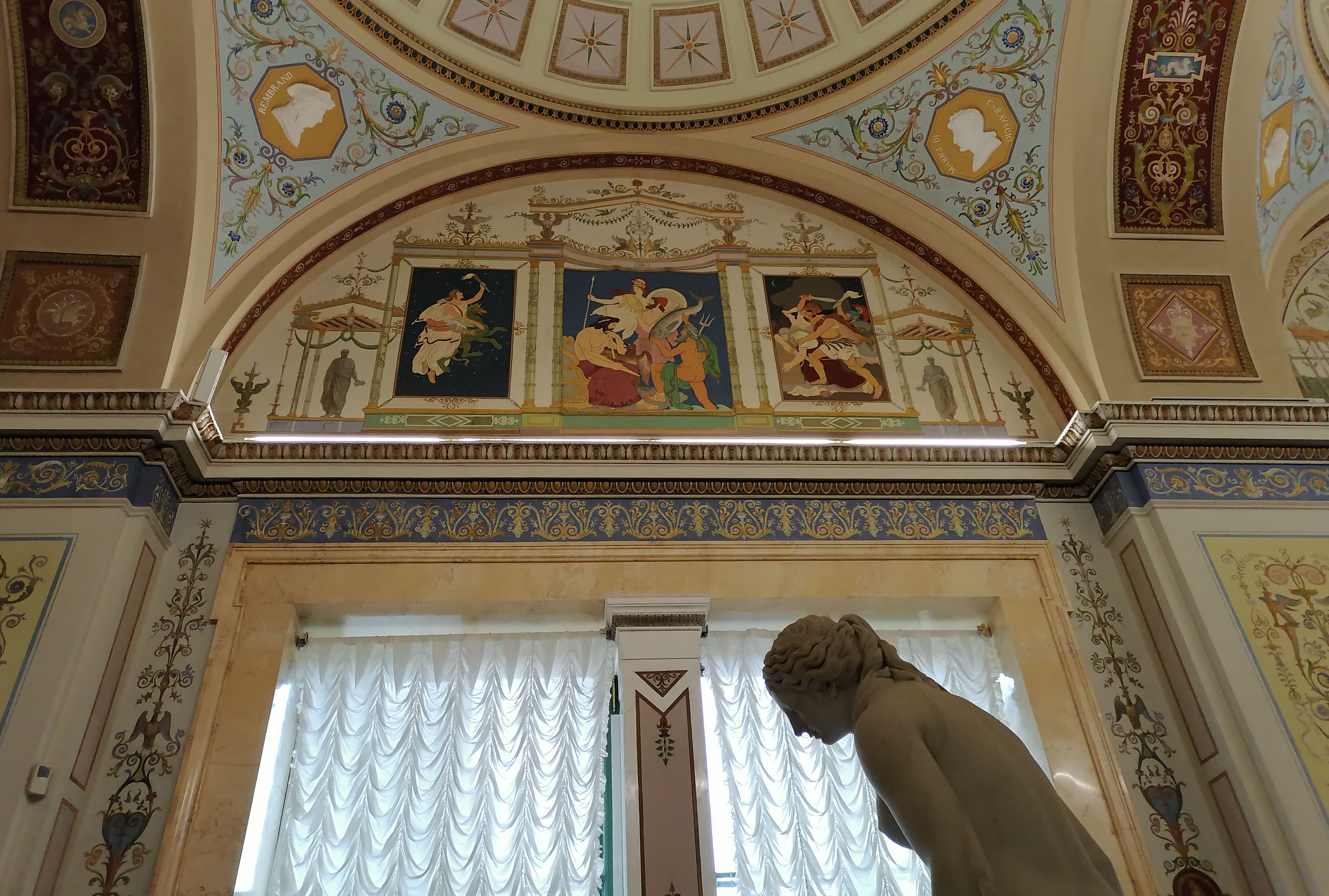

Cleanthes (Ancient Greek: Κλεάνθης) was an ancient painter of Corinth, who was mentioned among the inventors of that art by Pliny the Elder and Athenagoras of Athens.

A picture by him representing the birth of the goddess Minerva was seen in the temple of Diana near the Alpheius River (Artemis Alpheionia). This work was not, as the archaeologist Friedrich Wilhelm Eduard Gerhard once said, in a "ludicrous style", but rather in the severe style of ancient art. Modern scholars now believe Gerhard to be conflating Cleanthes with the artist Ctesilochus.

Two 19th-century frescos in Hermitage are reconstructions of his paintings by Johann Georg Hiltensperger.
