= Lauben (disambiguation) =

Lauben may refer to:

- Lauben, a municipality in the district of Oberallgäu in Bavaria.
- Lauben, Unterallgäu, a municipality in the district of Unterallgäu in Bavaria.
- Lubań (German: Lauban), a town in Lower Silesia.
