= Eschach =

Eschach may refer to:

== Places ==
- Eschach, Germany

== Rivers ==
- Eschach (Aitrach), a river of Baden-Württemberg and of Bavaria, Germany, headwater of the Aitrach
- Eschach (Neckar), a river of Baden-Württemberg, Germany, tributary of the Neckar
