= Ursersberg =

Mountain in the Adelegg range of Bavaria, Germany

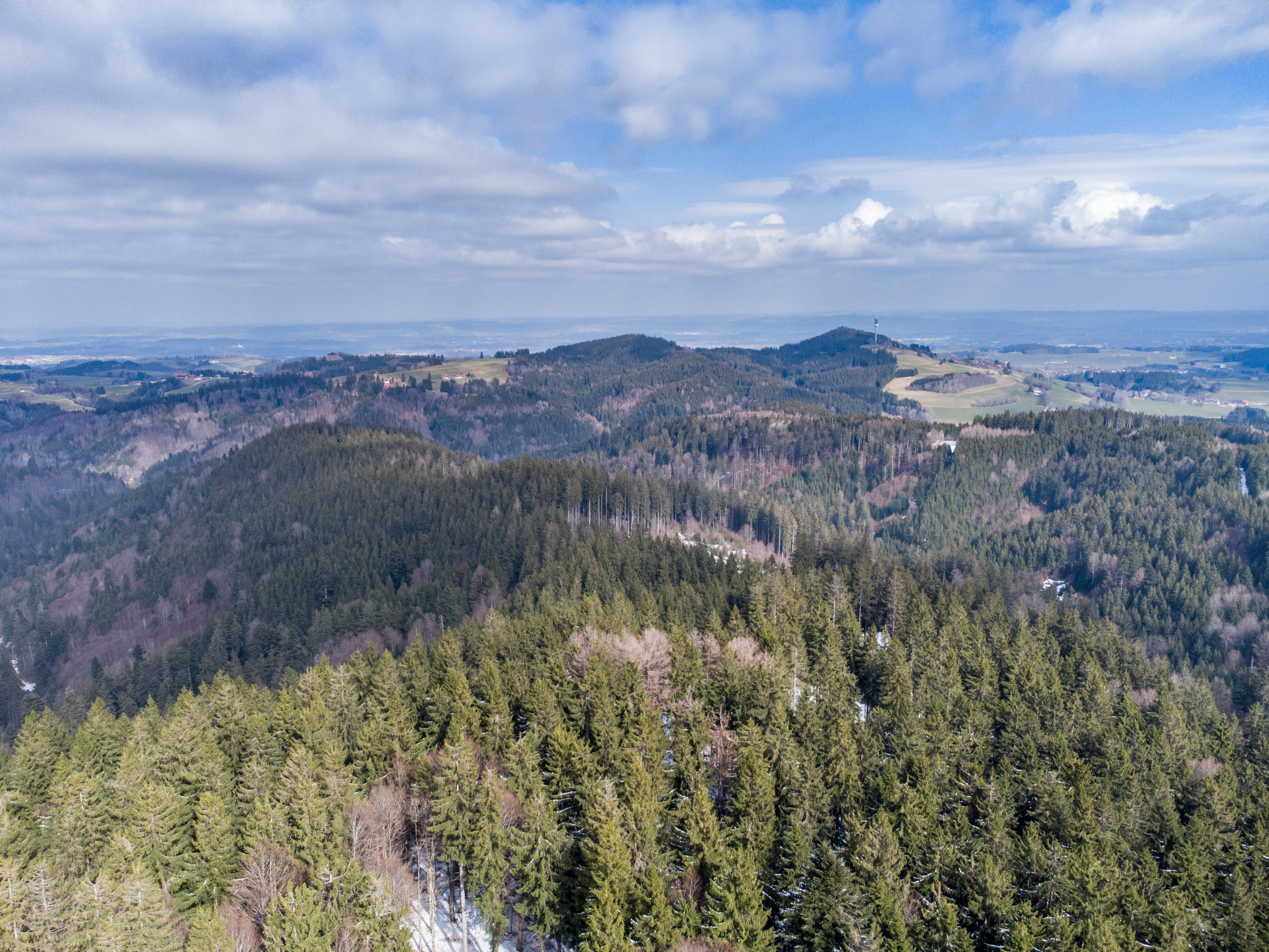
- Ursersberg in the Adelegg range

Highest point
- Elevation: 1,129.2 m (3,705 ft)
- Coordinates: 47°42′45″N 10°10′27″E

Geography
- Location within Bavaria
- Location: Oberallgäu, Bavaria, Germany
- Parent range: Adelegg

The Ursersberg, with an elevation of about 1129.2 m above sea level (NHN), is the highest mountain of the Adelegg range in the Bavarian district of Oberallgäu. It is situated within the Kürnach Forest.

== Geography ==
=== Location ===
The Ursersberg is situated in the southwest of Bavaria and forms part of the Adelegg, a wooded northern outlier of the Allgäu Alps that extends far into the northern Alpine foreland. Within the local Kürnach Forest, it rises about 1.4 km northwest of Eschach, a district of Buchenberg, to whose municipal territory the mountain belongs. Parts of the Fauna-Flora-Habitat area Kürnacher Wald (FFH no. 8227‑373; 27.5961 km²) lie on the mountain.

=== Natural regional classification ===
The Ursersberg belongs, within the Alpine Foreland, to the major natural regional unit group Nagelfluhhöhen und Senken zwischen Bodensee und Isar (no. 02). Within this group, it is part of the major unit Adelegg (023) and, more specifically, of the subunit Hohe (Southern) Adelegg (023.0).

=== Watershed ===
The Ursersberg forms the highest point on the watershed between the Kürnach to the north, the Eschach to the south, and the Kollerbach to the east. The Goldach north of the mountain drains via the Kürnach into the Eschach, while a stream rising on the southern slope also flows into the Eschach, whose waters continue through the Aitrach, the Iller, and the Danube to the Black Sea. The Kollerbach, which rises southeast of the mountain and receives water from the nearby Eschacher Weiher, likewise joins the Iller and ultimately the Danube.

=== Hiking and sports ===
The Ursersberg, which is not served by any roads, can be reached from the surrounding valleys on several forest and hiking trails. It is also part of a longer hiking route connecting Wegscheidel, the Ursersberg, the Hauptmannsberg and the Schwarzer Grat. One of them approaches the summit from the Buchenberg district of Eschach, passing through the Große Schwedenschanze at about 1,126 m before continuing past the Jägerhütte near a trail junction at roughly 1,103 m. On the mountain’s southeastern flank, above the village of Eschach, lies the Schwärzenlifte ski area.

== See also ==
- Adelegg
- Allgäu Alps
- Oberallgäu
- Schwarzer Grat
- List of mountains of Bavaria
