= Weitnau (Verwaltungsgemeinschaft) =

- Verwaltungsgemeinschaft
- Location of Weitnau within Oberallgäu district
- Interactive map of Weitnau
- Location within Germany Location within Bavaria
- Coordinates: 47°38′N 10°08′E
- Country: Germany
- State: Bavaria
- Admin. region: Swabia
- District: Oberallgäu
- Seat: Weitnau
- Subdivisions: 2 municipalities

Area
  - Total: 100.14 km^{2} (38.66 sq mi)

Population (2025-12-31)
  - Total: 6,831
  - Density: 68.21/km^{2} (176.7/sq mi)
- Time zone: UTC+01:00 (CET)
  - Summer (DST): UTC+02:00 (CEST)
- Website: www.weitnau.de

Weitnau is a Verwaltungsgemeinschaft (municipal association) in the district Oberallgäu in Bavaria, Germany. Its seat is in Weitnau.

It consists of the following municipalities:

1. Missen-Wilhams
2. Weitnau
