= Freilichtspiele Altusried =

Open-air theatre in Altusried, Germany

Coordinates: 47°47′42″N 10°12′55″E

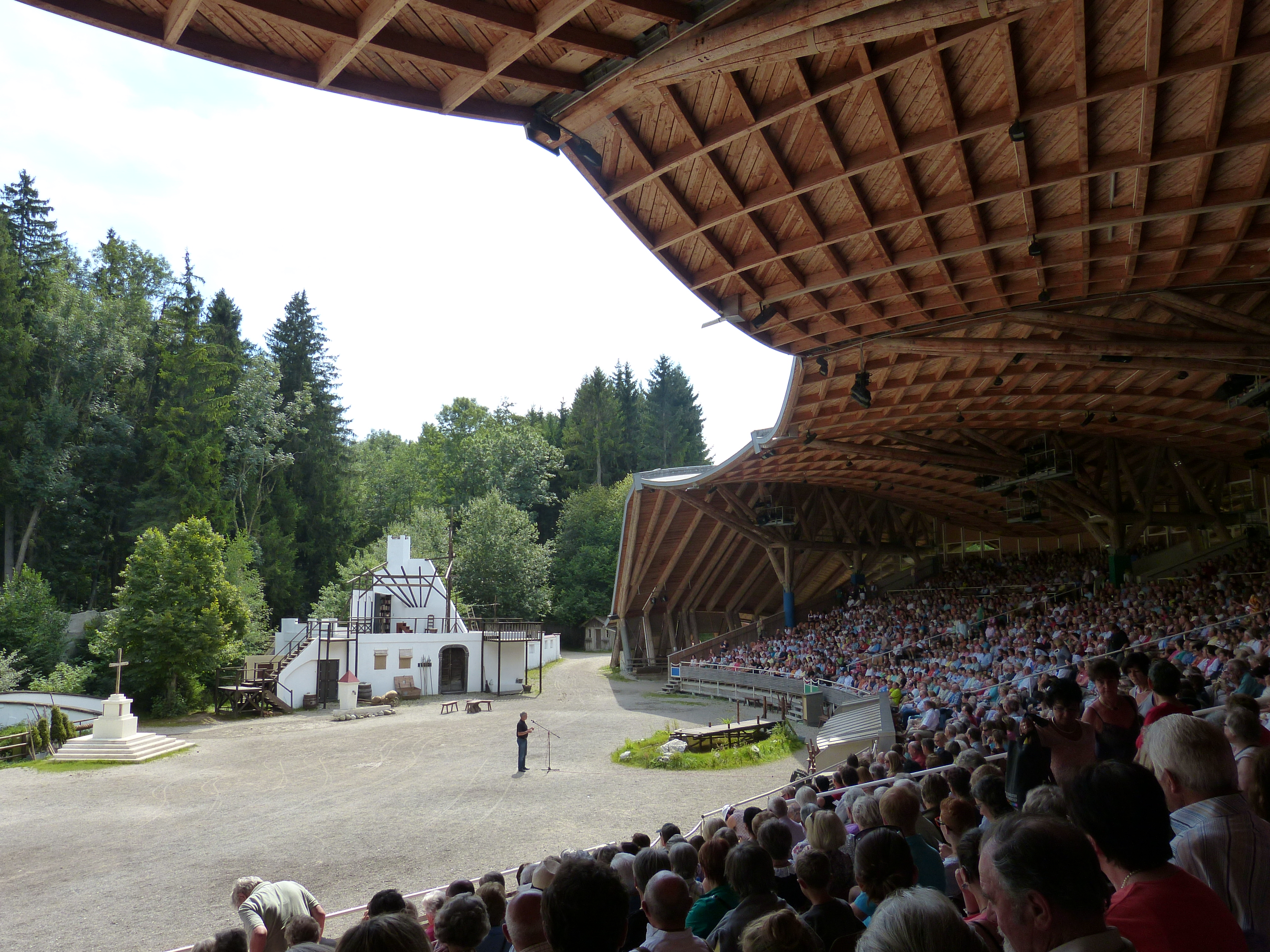
Freilichtbühne Altusried (2013)

Freilichtspiele Altusried is an open-air theatre in Altusried, Bavaria, Germany. Since its foundation in 1879, practically all actors and actresses are lay actors from the village Altusried. In 1999 a professional stage was built for the theatre with an audience capacity of 2500.
