= Wiggensbach =

- Municipality
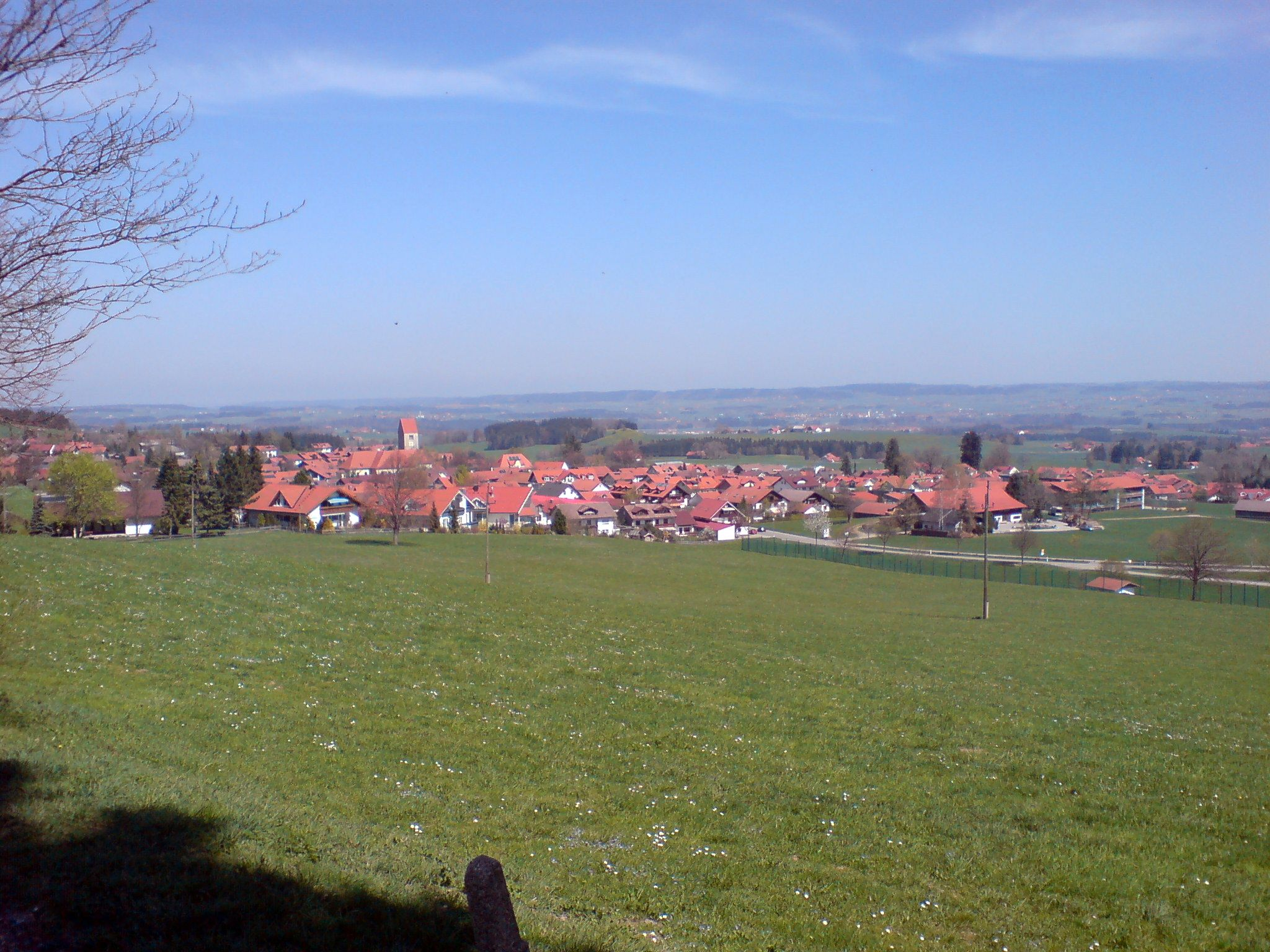
- Wiggensbach

- Coat of arms

- Location of Wiggensbach within Oberallgäu district
- Interactive map of Wiggensbach
- Location within Germany Location within Bavaria
- Coordinates: 47°44′45″N 10°13′55″E
- Country: Germany
- State: Bavaria
- Admin. region: Schwaben
- District: Oberallgäu
- Subdivisions: 3 Ortsteile und 72 Weiler/Einöden

Government
  - Mayor (2022–28): Thomas Eigstler (CSU)

Area
  - Total: 31.81 km^{2} (12.28 sq mi)
- Elevation: 870–1,077 m (2,854–3,533 ft)

Population (2025-12-31)
  - Total: 5,061
  - Density: 159.1/km^{2} (412.1/sq mi)
- Time zone: UTC+01:00 (CET)
  - Summer (DST): UTC+02:00 (CEST)
- Postal codes: 87487
- Dialling codes: 08370
- Vehicle registration: OA
- Website: www.wiggensbach.de

Wiggensbach (German pronunciation: [ˈvɪɡn̩sbax]) is a municipality in Bavaria. It is situated about 7 kilometres west of Kempten, the next greater town.

Neighbour municipalities are Altusried in the north and Buchenberg in the south of the village. The municipality consists of Wiggensbach as the main village and Ermengerst and Westenried as two districts of Wiggensbach. There are furthermore 72 hamlets in the area of the municipality.

The height of the village is between 870 and 1.077 metres above sea level.

Partner township of Wiggensbach is Hattstatt in France, in 2003 the two communes commemorate 20th anniversary of the partnership.

First settlements in the current boundaries of the municipality are documented for the district Ermengerst in 1037, for Wiggensbach itself in 1182. In 1888, the Wiggensbach treasure was found, its coins were dated back to the first to third century A.C. This proves the early settlement of humans in the area.
