= Wurzacher Ach =

River in Germany

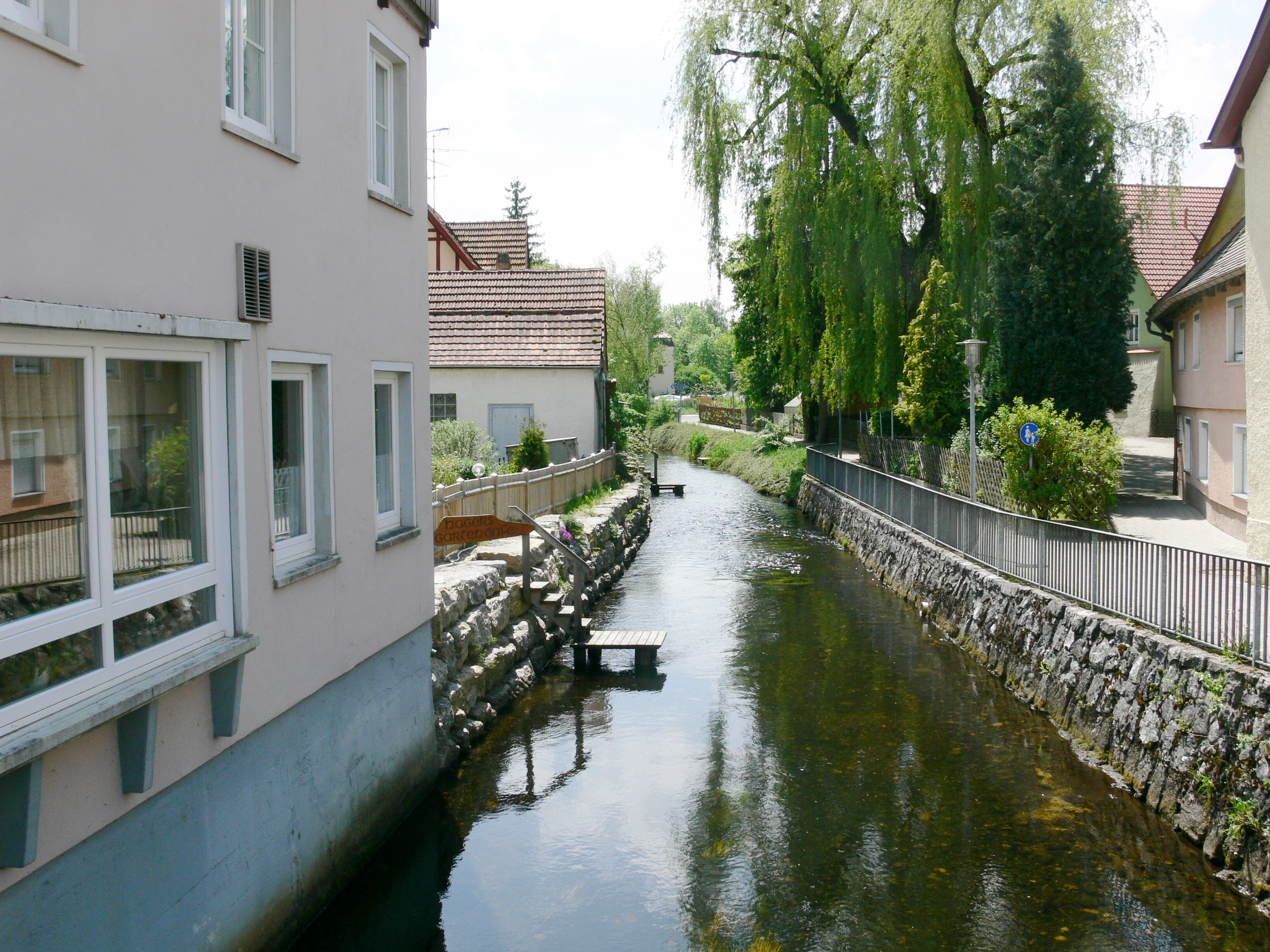

Location
- Country: Germany
- State: Baden-Württemberg

Physical characteristics
- Mouth
  - location: Aitrach
  - coordinates: 47.8710°N 10.0318°E

Basin features
- Progression: Aitrach→ Iller→ Danube→ Black Sea

Wurzacher Ach is a river of Baden-Württemberg, Germany. At its confluence with the Eschach near Leutkirch im Allgäu, the Aitrach is formed.

== See also ==
- List of rivers of Baden-Württemberg
