= Burgberg im Allgäu =

- Municipality
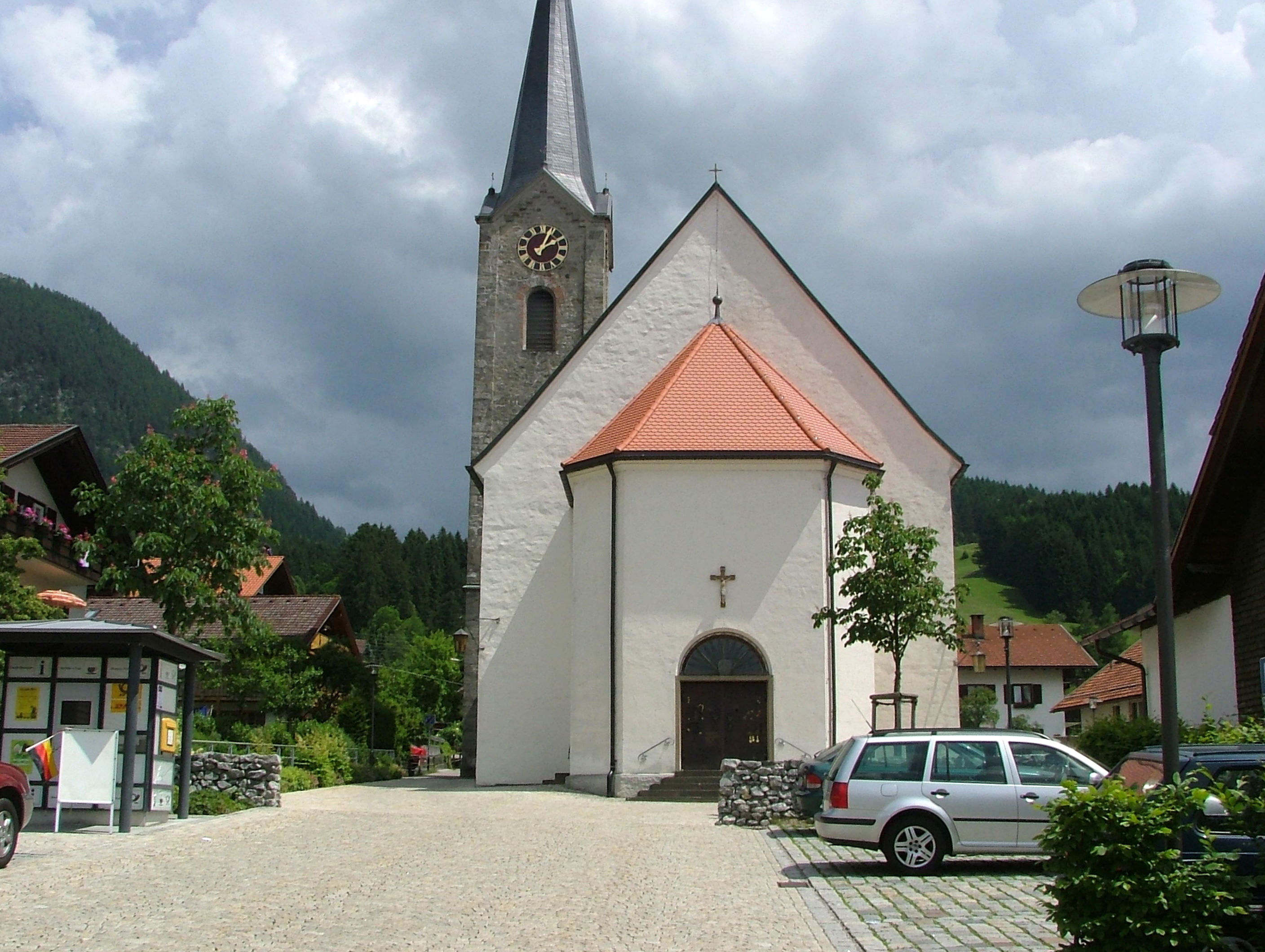
- Church square

- Coat of arms

- Location of Burgberg im Allgäu within Oberallgäu district
- Interactive map of Burgberg im Allgäu
- Location within Germany Location within Bavaria
- Coordinates: 47°32′N 10°17′E
- Country: Germany
- State: Bavaria
- Admin. region: Schwaben
- District: Oberallgäu

Government
  - Mayor (2020–26): André Eckhardt (CSU)

Area
  - Total: 15.95 km^{2} (6.16 sq mi)
- Elevation: 751 m (2,464 ft)

Population (2025-12-31)
  - Total: 3,117
  - Density: 195.4/km^{2} (506.1/sq mi)
- Time zone: UTC+01:00 (CET)
  - Summer (DST): UTC+02:00 (CEST)
- Postal codes: 87545
- Dialling codes: 08321
- Vehicle registration: OA
- Website: www.burgberg.de

Burgberg (German pronunciation: [ˈbʊʁkbɛʁk ʔɪm ˈʔalɡɔʏ], lit. 'Burgberg in the Allgäu') is a municipality in the district of Oberallgäu in Bavaria in Germany.
