= Ctesilochus =

Ctesilochus (fl. 4th century BCE) was a painter of ancient Greece. He was the pupil and perhaps brother of the much more renowned painter Apelles.

Ctesilochus was known primarily by a ludicrous, parodical picture representing the birth of Bacchus. This stood out even to the ancients as a somewhat unusual choice of subject.
