= Haldenwang, Oberallgäu =

Haldenwang
- Municipality
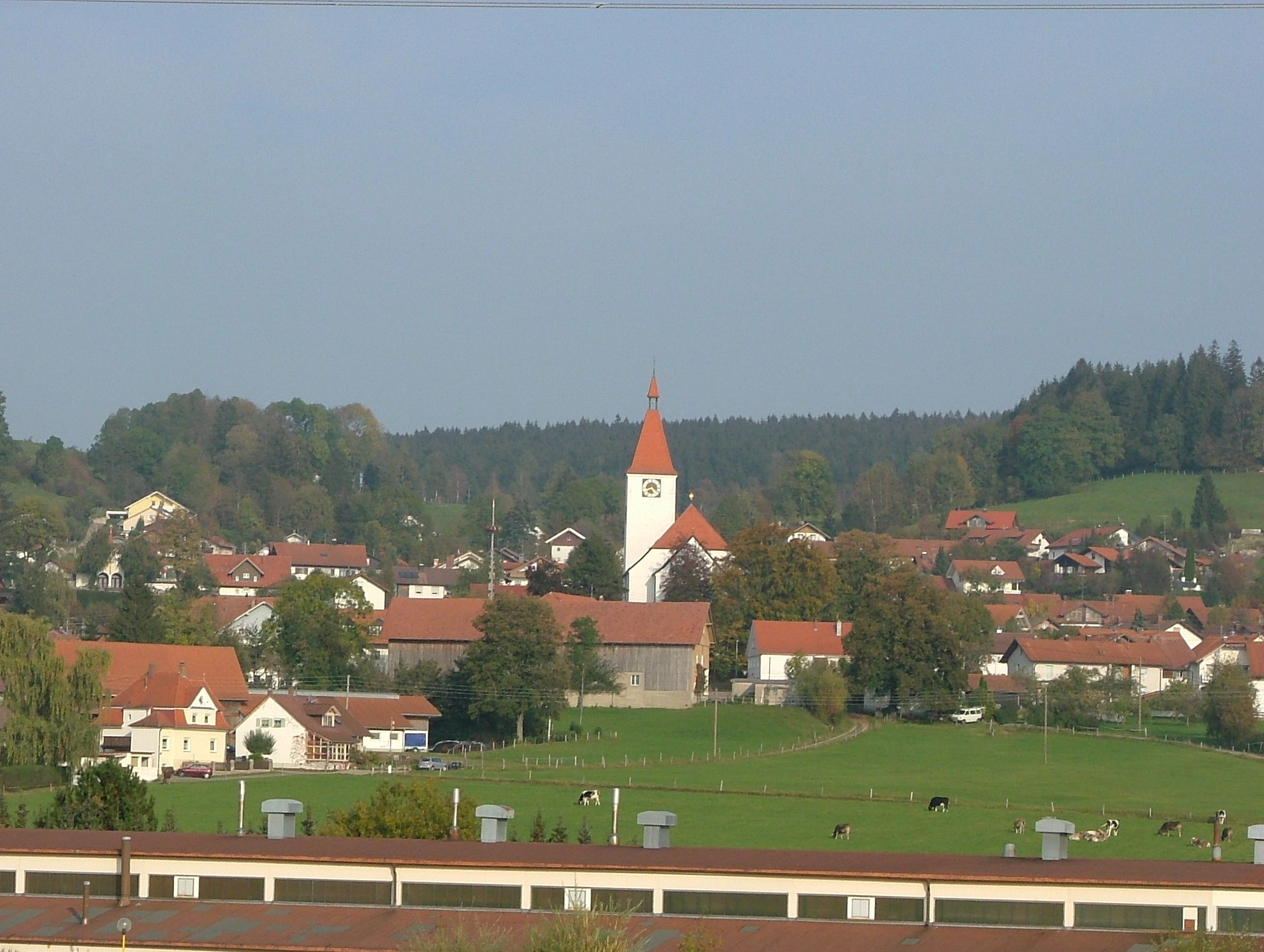
- Haldenwang

- Coat of arms

- Location of Haldenwang within Oberallgäu district
- Interactive map of Haldenwang
- Location within Germany Location within Bavaria
- Coordinates: 47°48′N 10°21′E
- Country: Germany
- State: Bavaria
- Admin. region: Schwaben
- District: Oberallgäu

Government
  - Mayor (2020–26): Josef Wölfle

Area
  - Total: 26.69 km^{2} (10.31 sq mi)
- Elevation: 757 m (2,484 ft)

Population (2025-12-31)
  - Total: 3,789
  - Density: 142.0/km^{2} (367.7/sq mi)
- Time zone: UTC+01:00 (CET)
  - Summer (DST): UTC+02:00 (CEST)
- Postal codes: 87490
- Dialling codes: 08374
- Vehicle registration: OA
- Website: www.haldenwang.de

Haldenwang (German pronunciation: [ˈhaldn̩vaŋ]) is a place in the district of Oberallgäu in Bavaria in Germany.
