= Blender (Adelegg) =

Mountain peak in Bavaria, Germany

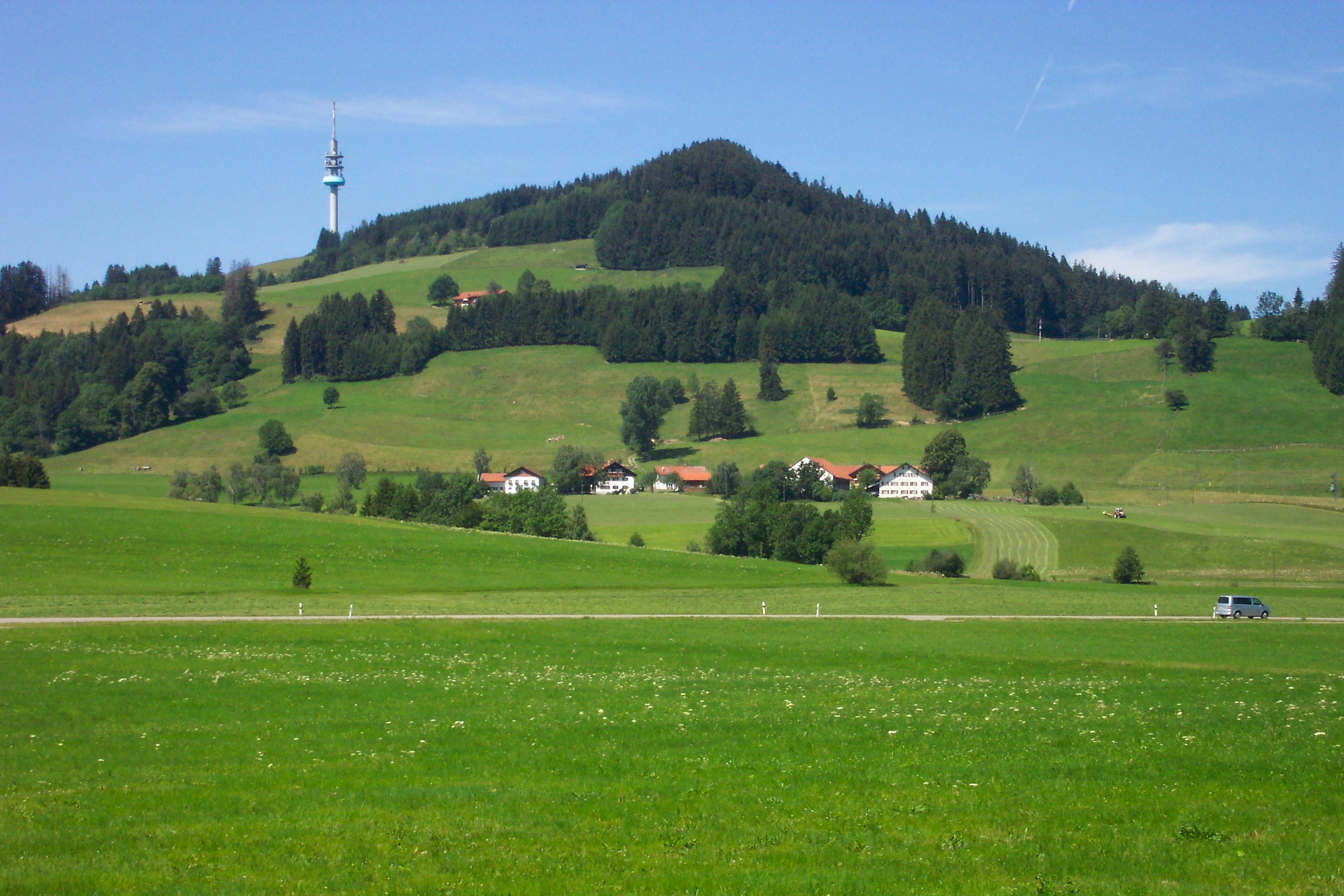

Highest point
- Elevation: 1,072.3 m (3,518 ft)
- Prominence: 57 m (187 ft)
- Coordinates: 47°43′49″N 10°13′29″E

Geography
- Location: Bavaria, Germany

Blender (German pronunciation: [ˈblɛndɐ]) is a subpeak of Dürrer Bühl in the mountain range of Adelegg in Bavaria, Germany.
