= Weitnau =

- Municipality
- View of Weitnau from the Sonneck, Hauchenberg in the background

- Coat of arms

- Location of Weitnau within Oberallgäu district
- Interactive map of Weitnau
- Location within Germany Location within Bavaria
- Coordinates: 47°39′N 10°8′E
- Country: Germany
- State: Bavaria
- Admin. region: Schwaben
- District: Oberallgäu
- Municipal assoc.: Weitnau

Government
  - Mayor (2020–26): Florian Schmid

Area
  - Total: 65.19 km^{2} (25.17 sq mi)
- Elevation: 798–1,243 m (2,618–4,078 ft)

Population (2025-12-31)
  - Total: 5,270
  - Density: 80.8/km^{2} (209/sq mi)
- Time zone: UTC+01:00 (CET)
  - Summer (DST): UTC+02:00 (CEST)
- Postal codes: 87480
- Dialling codes: 08375
- Vehicle registration: OA
- Website: www.weitnau.de

Weitnau (German pronunciation: [ˈvaɪtnaʊ]; Low Alemannic: Witne) is a municipality in the rural district Oberallgäu in Bavaria/Germany. Together with the neighboring municipality of Missen-Wilhams, Weitnau shares an administrative unit.

== Geography ==
Weitnau is situated in the Allgäu region in the foothills of the Bavarian Alps. The municipality consists of the town Weitnau and the villages of Seltmans, Sibratshofen, Kleinweiler, Hellengerst, Rechtis and Wengen; in addition to that there are several small hamlets, most notably Waltrams, Gerholz, Engelhirsch, Eisenbolz, Ettensberg, Klausenmühle and Weilerle. The town Weitnau lies in a valley bordered to the north by the Sonneck mountain (elev. 1109 m.) and to the south by the Hauchenberg mountain (elev. 1243 m.). The stream Weitnauer Bach has its source in the east of the municipality's area and flows into the 49 miles long river Argen in Seltmans. The Argen river itself flows into Lake Constance and thus is a tributary to the river Rhine, one of Germany's major rivers.

== Etymology ==
The name Weitnau is derived from the earliest names given to settlements in the valley. Such names can be traced back to the 8th century A.D. when a settlement in the Weitnau valley was referred to as "Witunavia", possibly an Old High German name. The prefix "witun" might be traced back to Old High German "wittan" meaning "to widen" or "make wider"; the suffix "avia" might be traced back to the Old High German "awia" meaning "land by the water". Thus Witunavia can roughly be translated to "broad pastures by a stream", a term which certainly does justice to a small stream settlement in a wide valley. Over the centuries the term was shortened and the suffix changed first to "Witenowe" - possibly Middle High German as the new suffix "owe" suggests - in the 12th century. Then to Weitnaw by the 16th century and Weüttnau by the 18th century. Around 1834 Weitnau was finally referred to as "Weidnau".

== History ==
Around 1200–800 BCE, Illyrians from the east and Veneti from the west started settling in the Allgäu. Argen is an Illyrian name and probably means "forest stream". In 90 CE, the Roman road from Cambodunum (Kempten) to Brigantium (Bregenz) led through the Wengen valley, where a Roman milestone was found in 1500. It is believed that Weitnau was mentioned for the first time in 726 as "Witunavia". It is certain that in 1250 Weitnau was mentioned as "Witenove".

Until 1805 Weitnau belonged to the Austrian House of Bregenz-Hohenegg. As early as the 13th century, Weitnau was an administrative center, the legal domicile of the House of Bregenz-Hohenegg and enjoyed the right to hold a market. In 1760, the last execution took place when a certain Lukas Bentele a "petty thief and idler" was decapitated by executioner Jakob Räß.

In 1805 it was ceded to Bavaria under the peace treaties of Brünn and Pressburg.

World War II took a heavy toll of lives, several dozen young men from the municipality fell on the frontlines in the West and particularly the East. Towards the end of the war, in April 1945, Weitnau was occupied first by French then by Moroccan troops, the French/Moroccans left in July of the same year, and American troops took over occupation duties in Weitnau.

Rechtis-Hellengerst, then only a rural community, voluntarily joined the municipality of Weitnau in 1963, in 1973 the municipality of Wengen was incorporated into the municipality of Weitnau when a regional reorganization of municipalities in Bavaria took place. Weitnau has been recognized as a climatic health resort since December 2005.

== Population Development ==
Weitnau's population has increased considerably since it reached a low in 1987 when only 3.873 citizens were counted. In 2005, 5.209 citizens were registered. Sustainable development of attractive new building grounds should guarantee a moderate increase of the population.

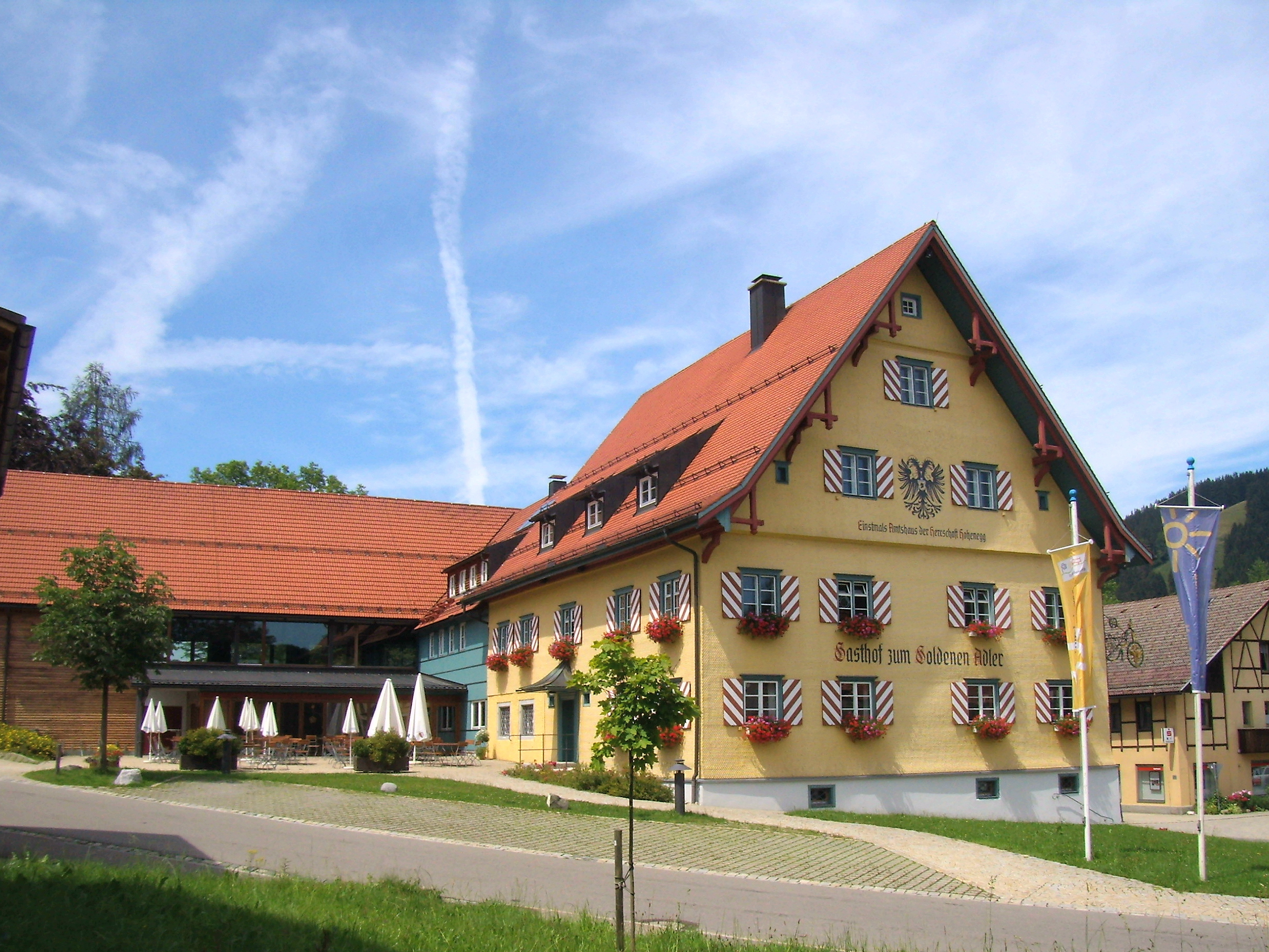
Gasthaus Adler in the town centre

== Economy ==
A number of small and medium-sized companies are located within the community area. Metal- and plastics-processing companies are to be found as well as a larger number of trades. According to the community's website, 373 companies are registered currently; there are 49 workshops, 18 companies in the catering trade, a number of retailers and 17 industrial companies.

A new industrial estate is currently being developed to the west of Weitnau offering opportunities for a number of new businesses. Furthermore, there are 145 farms cultivating some 34 square kilometres of agricultural land and 28 square kilometres of woodland in the municipality.

== Education ==
The Volksschule (elementary and secondary school) Weitnau serves a large catchment area. Apart from pupils of the municipality of Weitnau, recently also pupils from the neighboring community of Missen have been taught in Weitnau. The Volksschule consists of the main building in Weitnau, which was extended and refurbished in the mid-1990s, and a small branch in the village Kleinweiler.
In school year 2006/2007, some 420 pupils in 18 classes are taught by 29 teachers and tutors.
Two nursery schools, also in Weitnau and Kleinweiler, with 14 attendants serve the needs of young families.

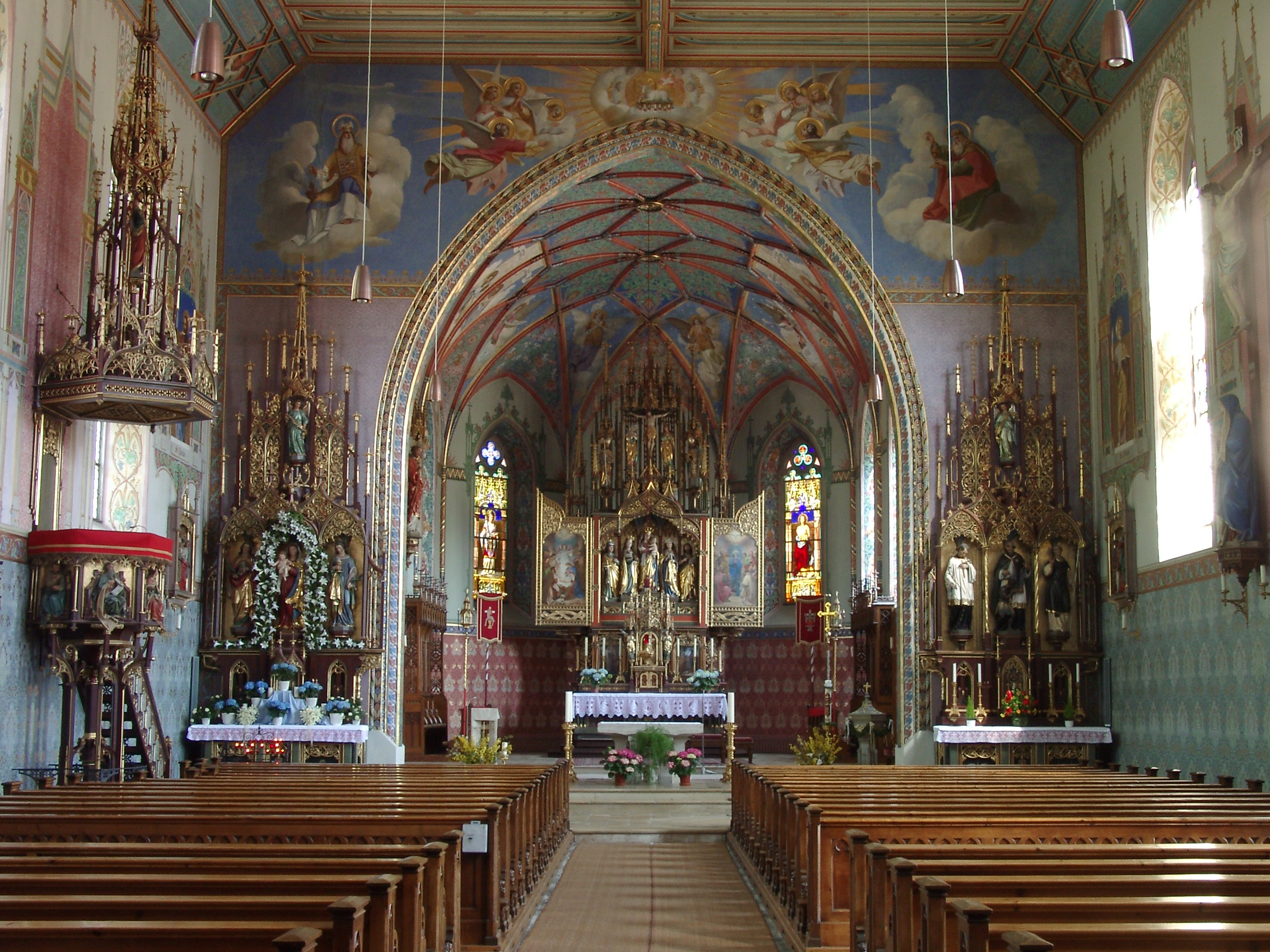
Interior of St. Pelagius Church

== Sights and Places of Interest ==
• Carl-Hirnbein-Erlebnisweg; an adventure hiking trail between Weitnau and Missen featuring attractions, playgrounds and sheltered places for rest. Numerous displays provide detailed information about the flora and fauna in the surrounding forest and invite hikers to participate in games and to solve educative riddles and anagrams.

Spider playground - one of the playgrounds of the Carl-Hirnbein hiking trail

Sefele's Ruh - Station no.16 of the Carl-Hirnbein hiking trail

• Hauchenberg and "Alpkönigblick"; on top of the Hauchenberg mountain a lookout tower was constructed in 2007 with the help of helicopter airlifts. At a height of 1240 m., the "Alpkönigblick", which was officially opened on 21 October 2007 by the Bavarian State Minister of Agriculture and Forestry Josef Miller, offers scenic views of the Weitnau valley and surrounding landscape to the north, and the German, Austrian and Swiss Alps to the south. A short stroll away Kling's Alpe, a licensed mountain hut offering food and service to hikers at weekends, opened in September 2007.

• St. Pelagius Church; the neo-Gothic church of the town of Weitnau. Reconstructed in part 1862-72. In all probability only the nave was reconstructed, the choir, which was built in 1739-1740, was very likely retained. Parts of the spire date back to the 14th century. The church is considered a neo-Gothic sacred building, it features numerous elaborate stencil drawings and colourful embellishments. The statues of the high altar originate from the Multscher School and date back to around 1490. Station of the Jakobus Pilgrimage Trail

• Alttrauchburg Castle Ruins; extensively reconstructed castle ruins with inn and beer garden overlooking the village Kleinweiler. The Alttrauchburg can be reached via signposted hiking trails in approximately an hour from Weitnau.

• Adler Guesthouse; guesthouse in the town of Weitnau which used to house the official chambers of the House of Bregenz-Hohenegg. Probably built in 1753. Today a restaurant and guesthouse which also houses the public library, the tourism office and a small museum.

• 18-Hole Golf Course in Hellengerst which offers panoramic views of the Alps.

• Argental Skilifte; Two ski lifts offer well-prepared pistes for beginners and seasoned skiers and snowboarders. The 500-metre-long family lift, a modern T-bar lift with a difference in altitude of 120 metres, was completely rebuilt in the early 2000s. In addition, there is a 100-metre beginners lift with a difference in altitude of 20 metres. Right next to the beginners lift, a short run is usually prepared for sledges and toboggans. Weitnau's cross-country skiing network has its starting point here and is regularly tracked from here.

== Town twinning ==
Weitnau has been twinned with Magné, a municipality in the north-west of France near the Atlantic Coast, since 1986.
