= Missen-Wilhams =

- Municipality
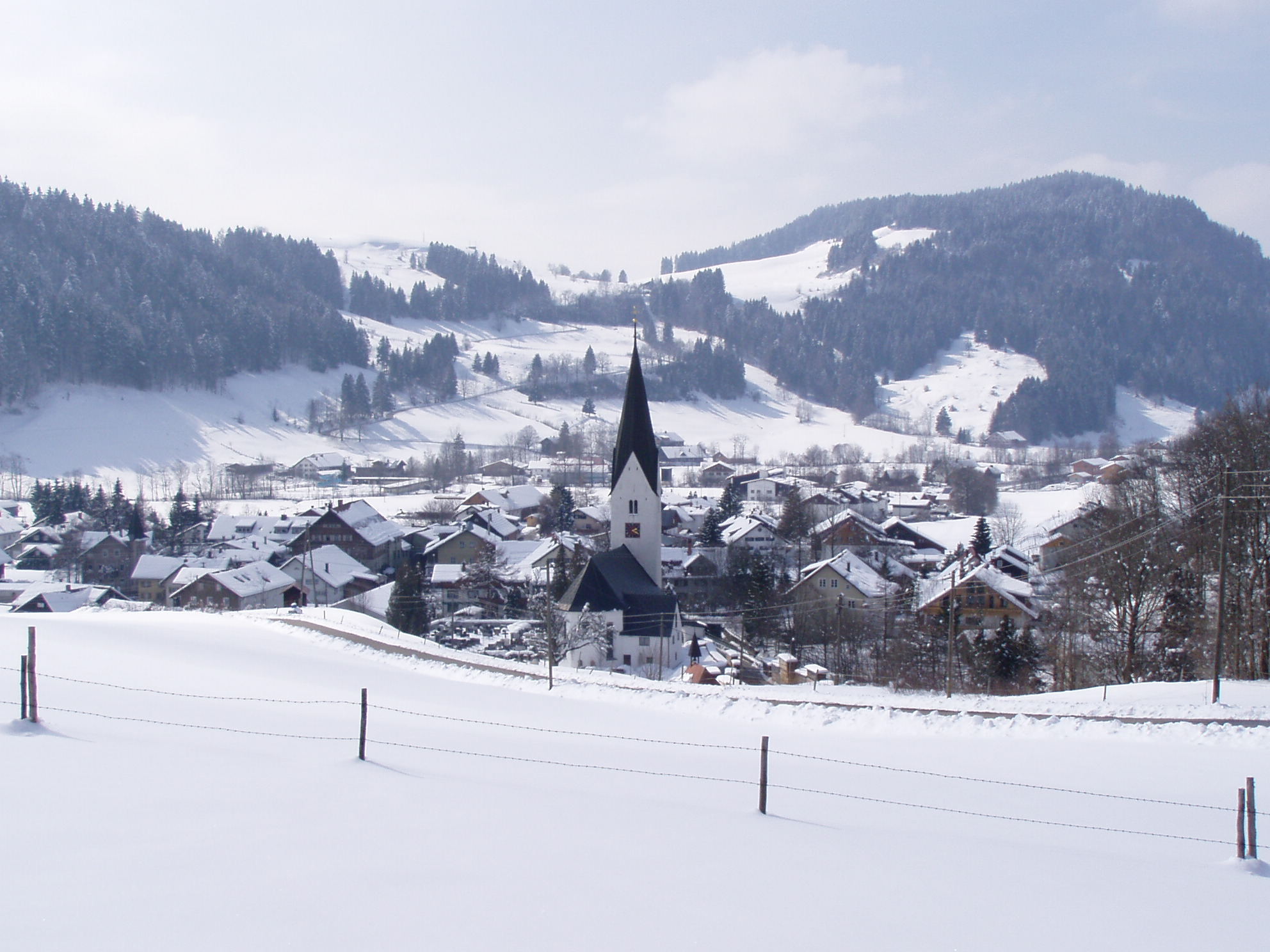
- Missen in winter

- Coat of arms

- Location of Missen-Wilhams within Oberallgäu district
- Interactive map of Missen-Wilhams
- Location within Germany Location within Bavaria
- Coordinates: 47°36′N 10°7′E
- Country: Germany
- State: Bavaria
- Admin. region: Schwaben
- District: Oberallgäu
- Municipal assoc.: Weitnau

Government
  - Mayor (2020–26): Martina Wilhelm

Area
  - Total: 34.96 km^{2} (13.50 sq mi)
- Elevation: 860 m (2,820 ft)

Population (2025-12-31)
  - Total: 1,561
  - Density: 44.65/km^{2} (115.6/sq mi)
- Time zone: UTC+01:00 (CET)
  - Summer (DST): UTC+02:00 (CEST)
- Postal codes: 87547
- Dialling codes: 08320
- Vehicle registration: OA
- Website: www.missen-wilhams.de

Missen-Wilhams is a municipality in the district of Oberallgäu in Bavaria, Germany.

== Gallery ==
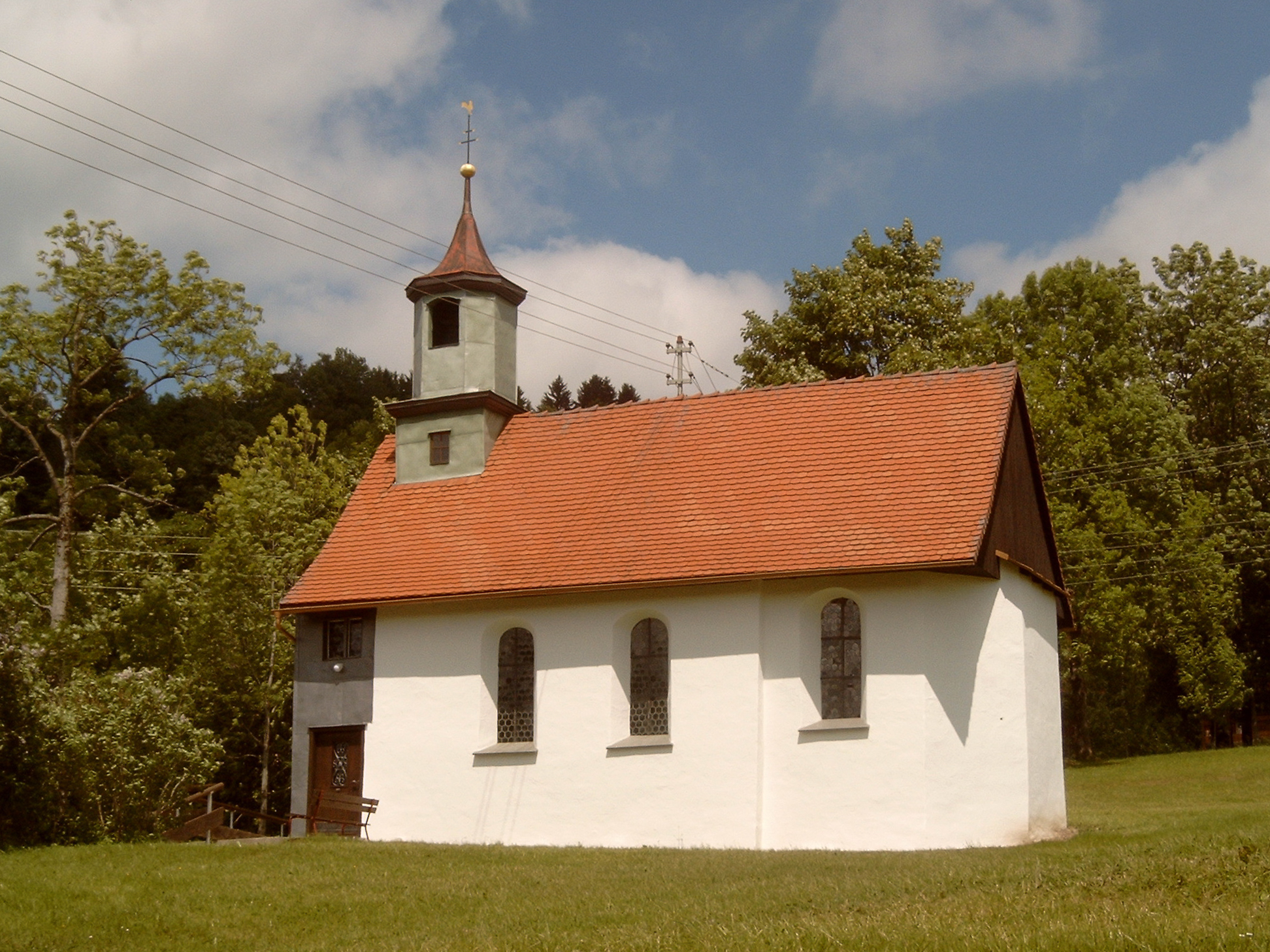
Börlas, chapel

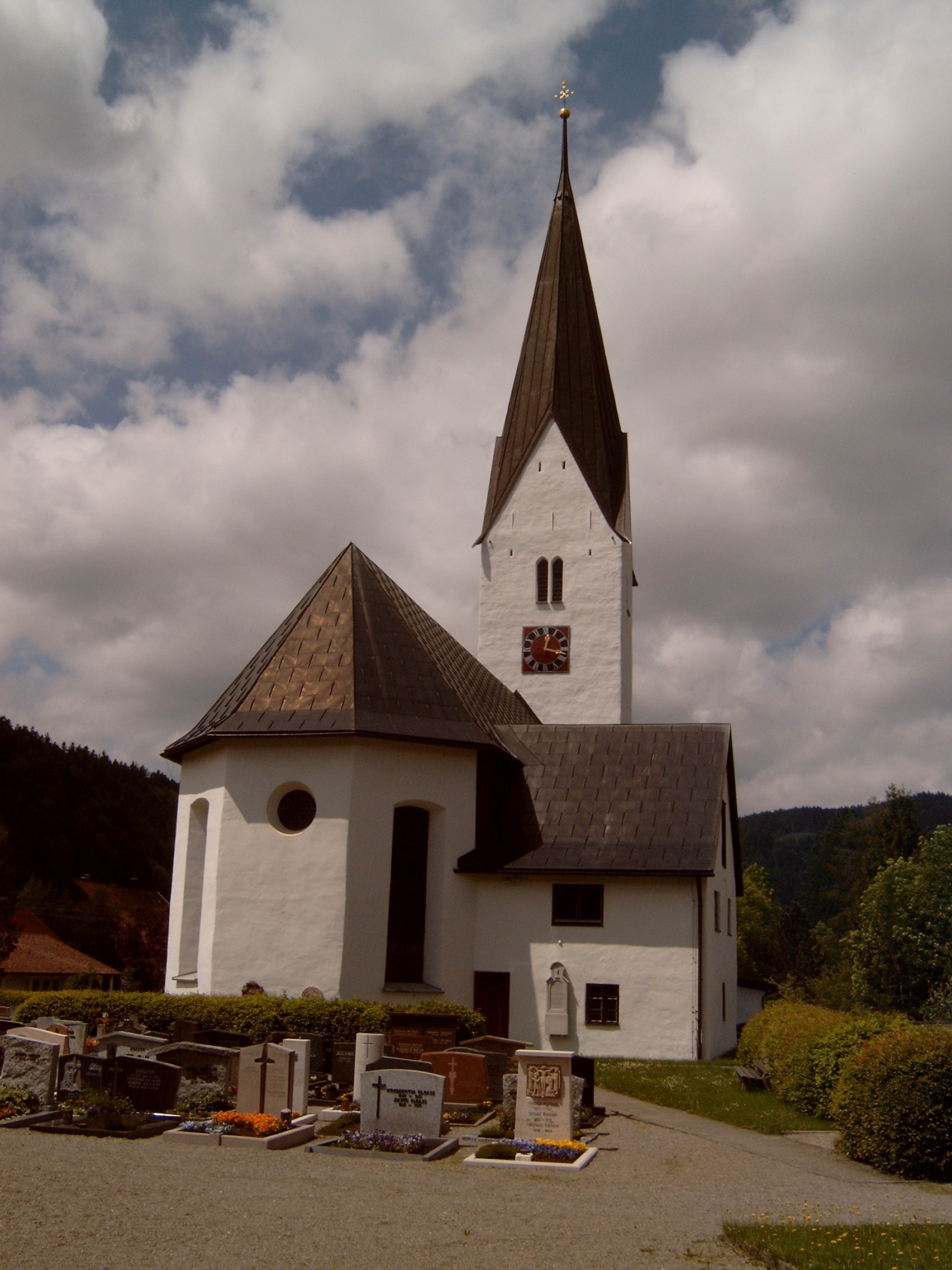
Missen, church

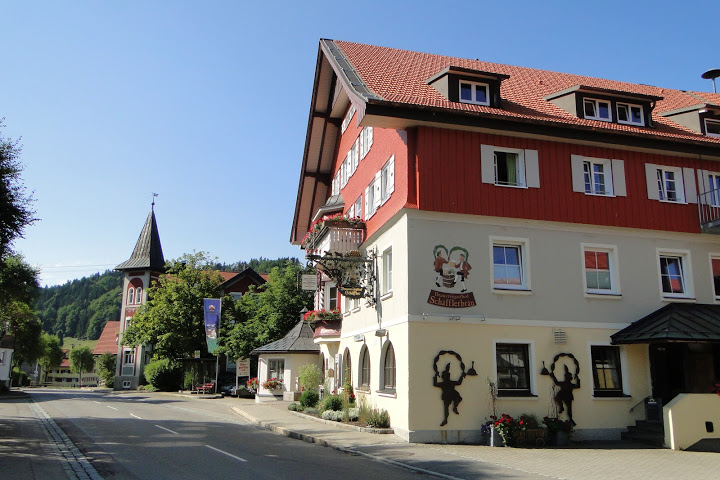
Missen, hotel in traditional style
