= Johann Georg Hiltensperger =

German painter

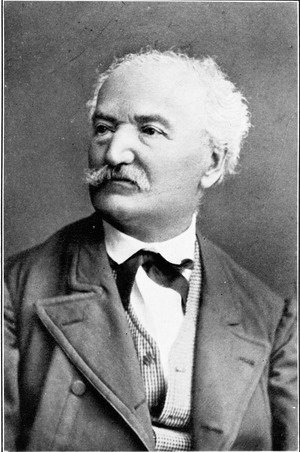
Johann Georg Hiltensperger

Johann Georg Hiltensperger (21 February 1806 – 13 June 1890) was a German history painter and a professor at the Royal Academy of Fine Arts.

== Biography ==
Born in Haldenwang, Oberallgäu, he was trained in drawing by L. Weiß before studying under Johann Peter von Langer at the Royal Art Academy and under Peter von Cornelius at the Kunstakademie Düsseldorf. Returning to Munich in 1825, he there received commissions for frescoes and oil paintings from Ludwig I of Bavaria and Maximilian II Joseph of Bavaria. For example, between 1838 and 1865 he produced the Odyssey Cycle in festal hall of the Munich Residenz to designs by Ludwig Schwanthaler. He also became a member of Munich's Vereins für Christliche Kunst (Association for Christian Art)

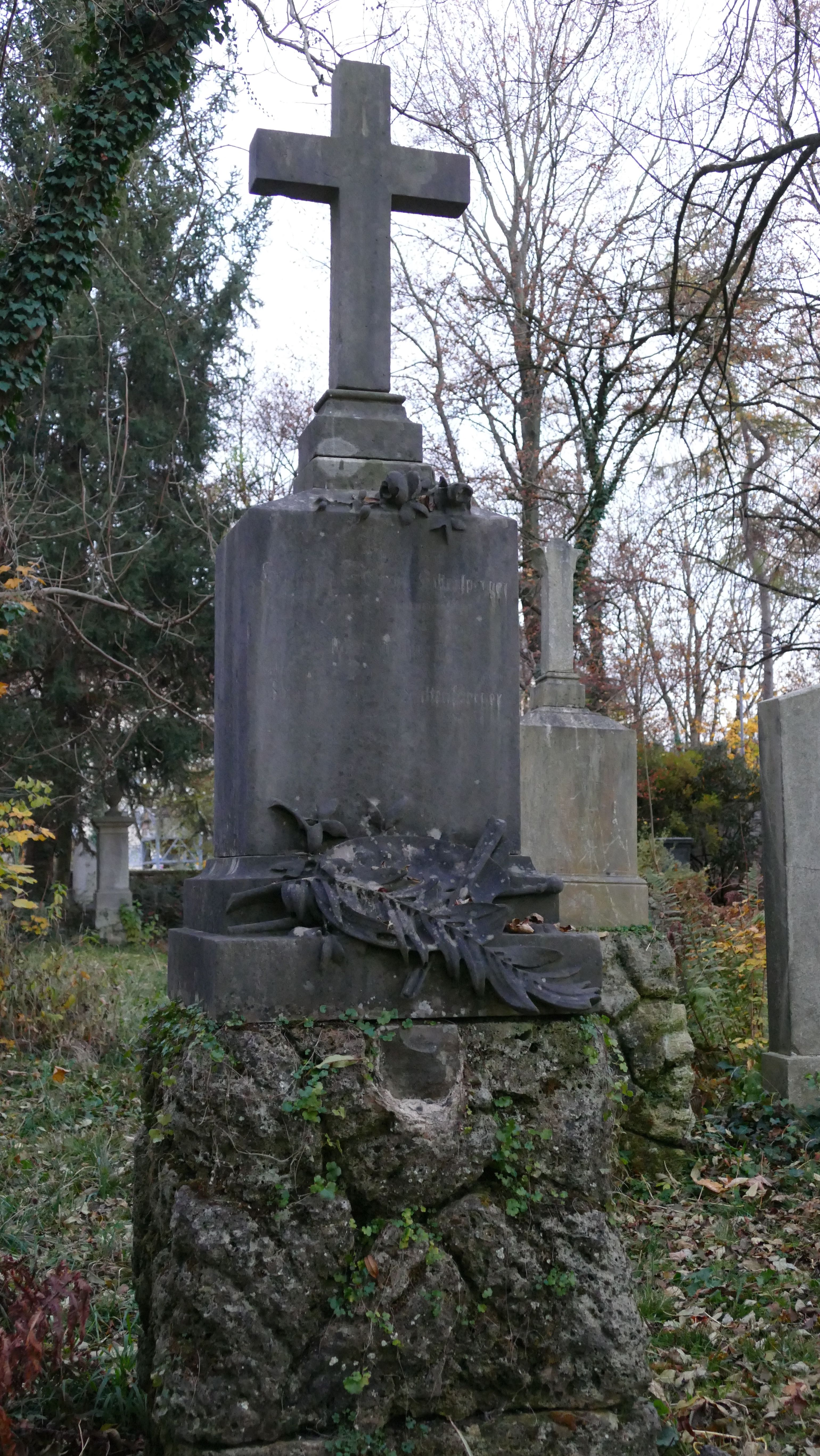
His grave

His first marriage was in Unterbruck to Anna Theresia von Paur (1806–1831), daughter of a member of the landed gentry. Anna was the sister to Carl von Paur, a member of parliament. Otto Hiltensperger, a son by his second marriage, also became a painter. Johann died in Munich and is buried in Gräberfeld 15 – Reihe 13 – Platz 17 of the city's Alter Südfriedhof.

== Selected works ==
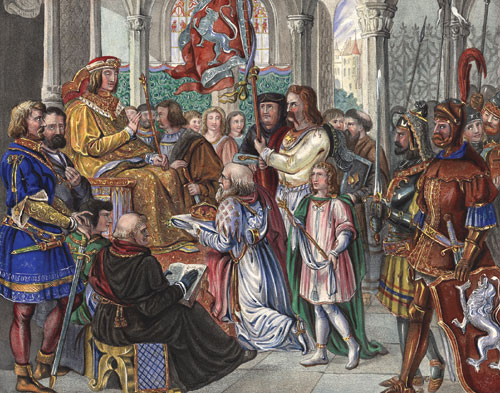
Albert III, Duke of Bavaria refusing the kingly crown

== Bibliography ==
- Hiltensperger, Johann Georg. In: John Rosén, Theodor Westrin, B. F. Olsson (Hrsg.): Nordisk familjebok konversationslexikon och realencyklopedi. 1. Auflage. Band 6: Grimsby–Hufvudskatt. Gernandts boktryckeri, Stockholm 1883, Sp. 1240 (schwedisch, runeberg.org).
- Hiltensperger, Johann Georg. In: Theodor Westrin (Hrsg.): Nordisk familjebok konversationslexikon och realencyklopedi. 2. Auflage. Band 11: Harrisburg–Hypereides. Nordisk familjeboks förlag, Stockholm 1909, Sp. 704 (schwedisch, runeberg.org).
- Hiltensperger, Johann Georg. In: Hans Vollmer (ed.): Allgemeines Lexikon der Bildenden Künstler von der Antike bis zur Gegenwart. Begründet von Ulrich Thieme und Felix Becker. Band 17: Heubel–Hubard. E. A. Seemann, Leipzig 1924, S. 106.
