= Lauben =

- Municipality
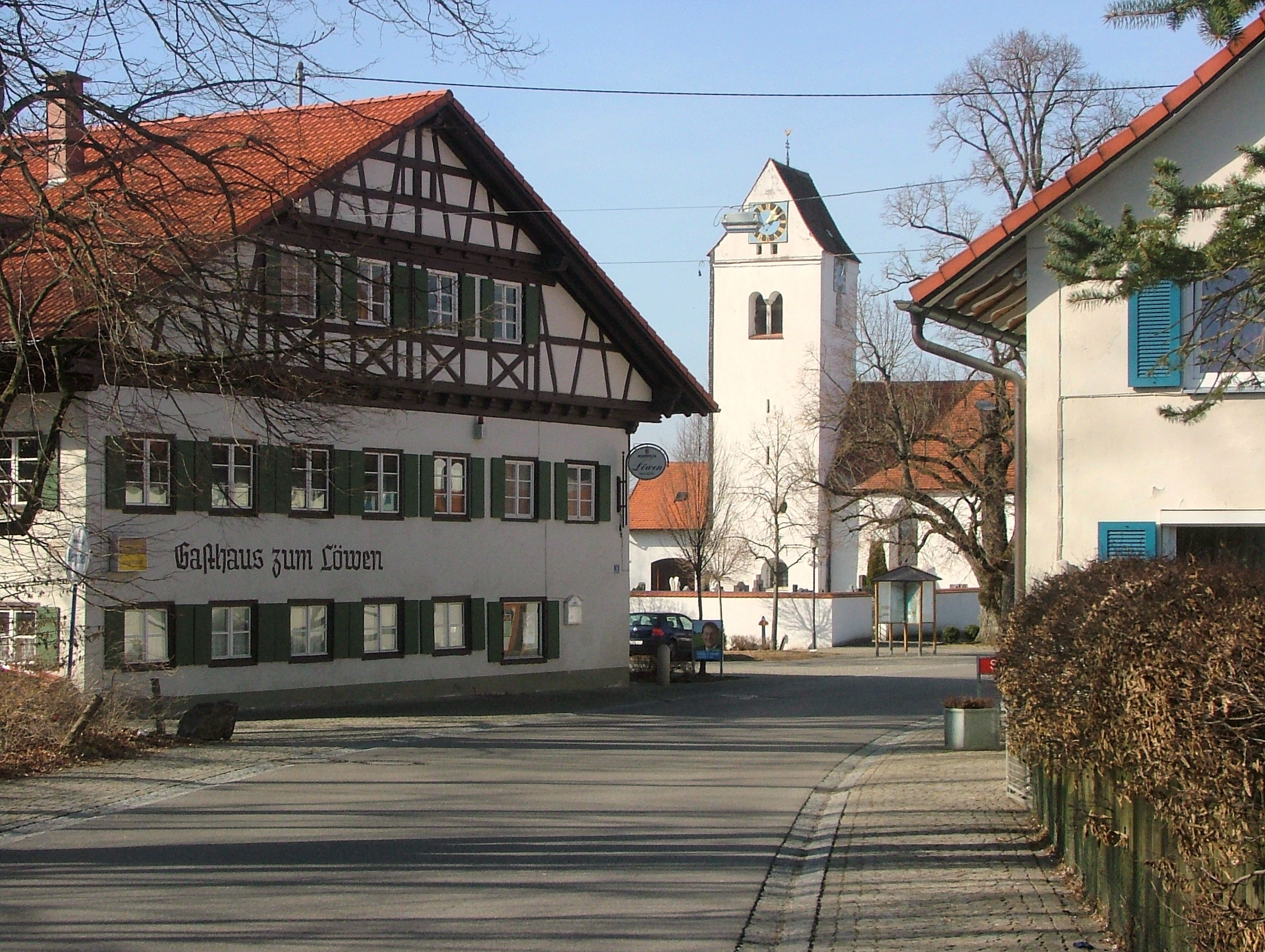
- Lauben

- Coat of arms

- Location of Lauben within Oberallgäu district
- Interactive map of Lauben
- Location within Germany Location within Bavaria
- Coordinates: 47°47′N 10°18′E
- Country: Germany
- State: Bavaria
- Admin. region: Schwaben
- District: Oberallgäu

Government
  - Mayor (2023–29): Mathias Pfuhl

Area
  - Total: 8.41 km^{2} (3.25 sq mi)
- Elevation: 647–708 m (2,123–2,323 ft)

Population (2025-12-31)
  - Total: 3,464
  - Density: 412/km^{2} (1,070/sq mi)
- Time zone: UTC+01:00 (CET)
  - Summer (DST): UTC+02:00 (CEST)
- Postal codes: 87493
- Dialling codes: 08374
- Vehicle registration: OA
- Website: www.lauben.de

Lauben (German pronunciation: [ˈlaʊbn̩]) is a municipality in the district of Oberallgäu in Bavaria in Germany.
