= Raggenhorn =

Mountain in Baden-Württemberg, Germany

Coordinates: 47°41′07″N 10°08′00″E

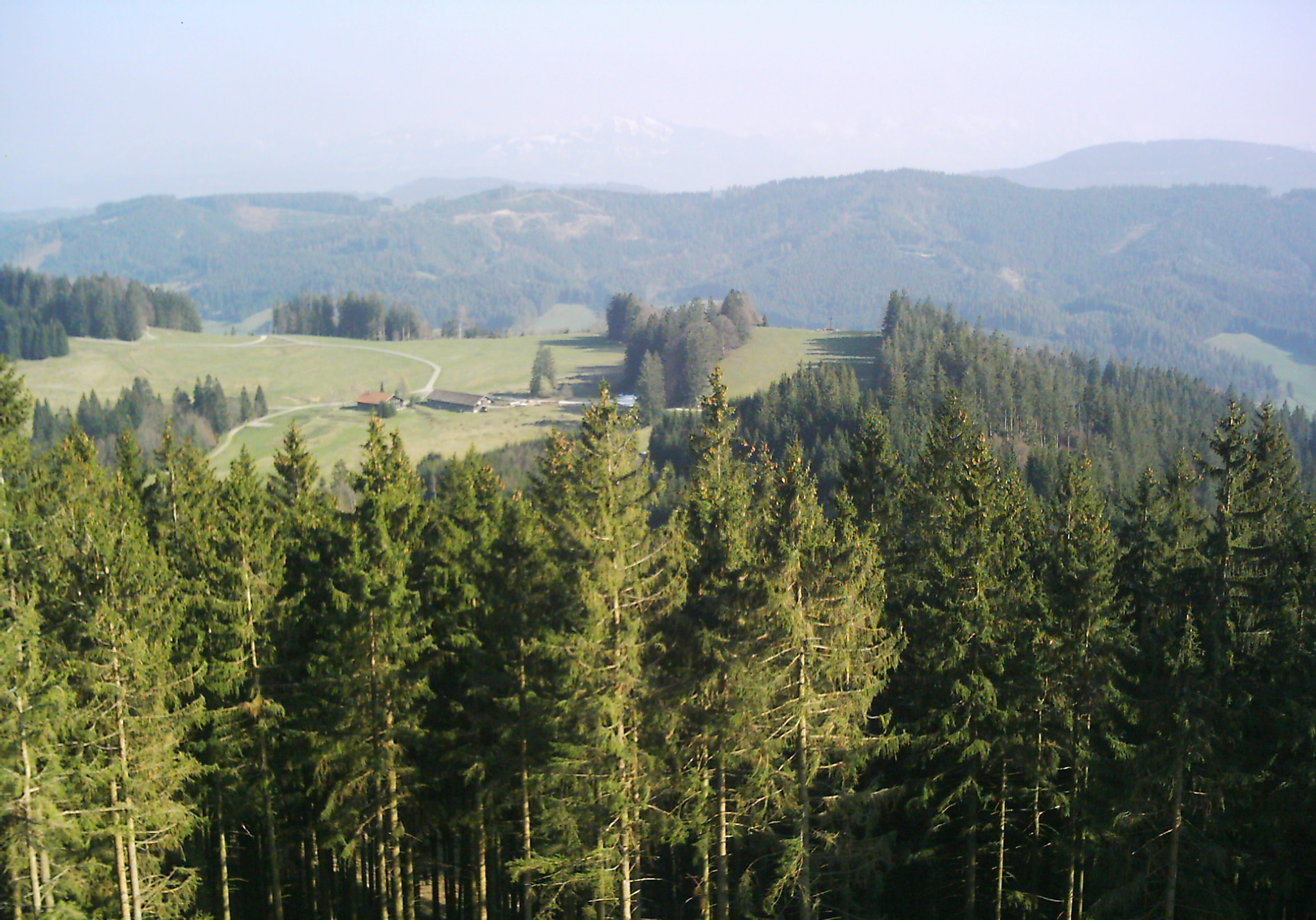
- View from the Black Ridge to the Raggenhorn (center right with the summit cross and buildings of the Wenger Eggalm).

Highest point
- Elevation: 1,056.2 m (3,465 ft)

Geography
- Location: Baden-Württemberg, Germany

Raggenhorn is a mountain of Baden-Württemberg, Germany.
