= Altusried =

- Municipality
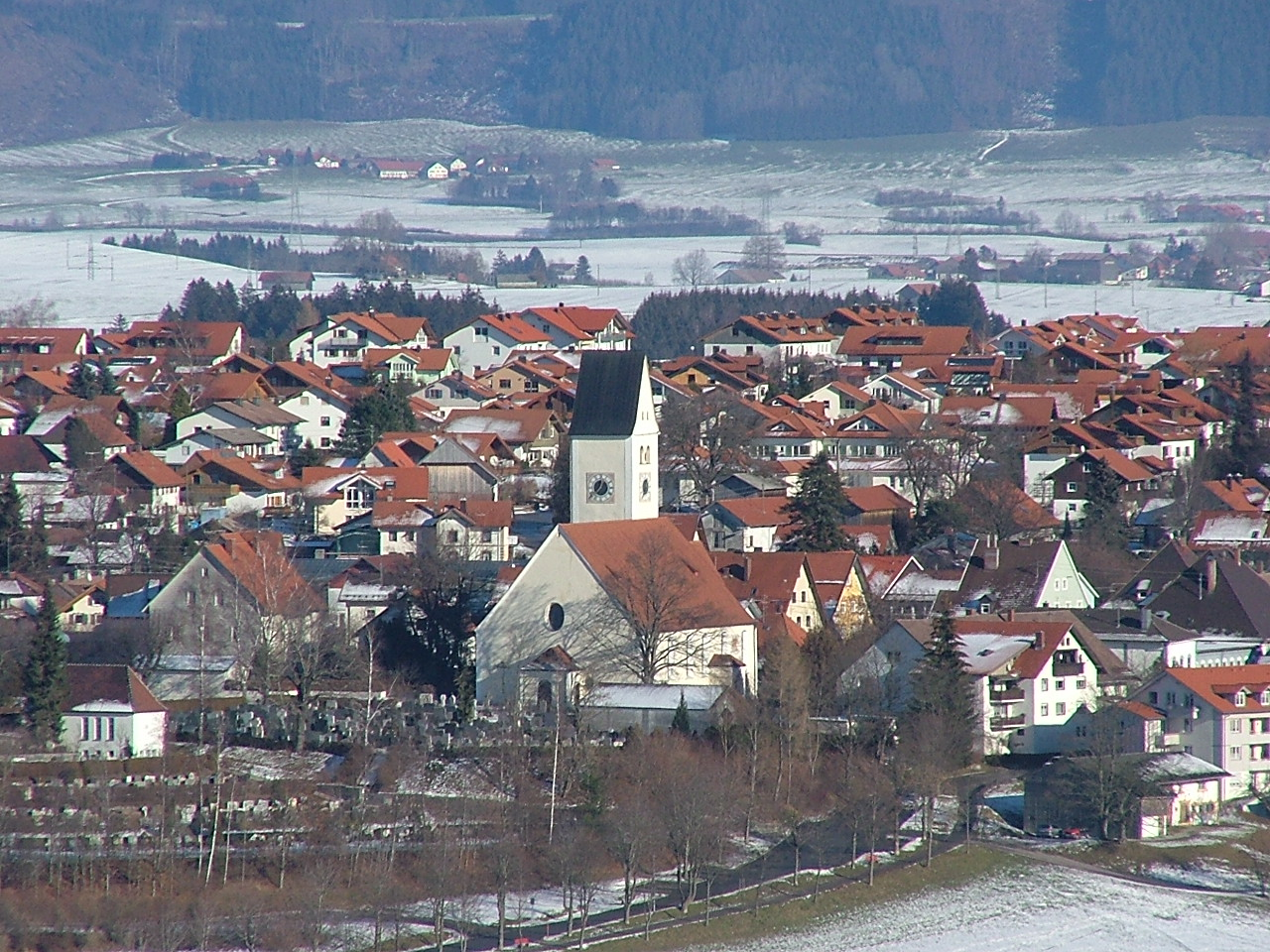
- Altusried

- Coat of arms

- Location of Altusried within Oberallgäu district
- Interactive map of Altusried
- Location within Germany Location within Bavaria
- Coordinates: 47°48′N 10°13′E
- Country: Germany
- State: Bavaria
- Admin. region: Schwaben
- District: Oberallgäu

Government
  - Mayor (2024–30): Max Boneberger

Area
  - Total: 91.68 km^{2} (35.40 sq mi)
- Elevation: 723 m (2,372 ft)

Population (2025-12-31)
  - Total: 10,426
  - Density: 113.7/km^{2} (294.5/sq mi)
- Time zone: UTC+01:00 (CET)
  - Summer (DST): UTC+02:00 (CEST)
- Postal codes: 87452
- Dialling codes: 08373
- Vehicle registration: OA
- Website: www.altusried.de

Altusried (German pronunciation: [ˈaltʊsʁiːt]) is a municipality in the district of Oberallgäu in Bavaria in Germany. It is host to the open-air theatre Freilichtspiele Altusried.
