= Oberallgäu =

Coordinates: 47°35′N 10°15′E

- District
- Flag Coat of arms
- Country: Germany
- State: Bavaria
- Adm. region: Swabia
- Capital: Sonthofen

Government
  - District admin.: Indra Baier-Müller (FW)

Area
  - Total: 1,528 km^{2} (590 sq mi)

Population (31 December 2025)
  - Total: 155,421
  - Density: 101.7/km^{2} (263.4/sq mi)
- Time zone: UTC+01:00 (CET)
  - Summer (DST): UTC+02:00 (CEST)
- Vehicle registration: OA
- Website: www.oberallgaeu.org

Oberallgäu (German pronunciation: [ˈoːbɐˌʔalɡɔʏ]; Alemannic German: Landchrais Oberallgai) is a Landkreis (district) in Swabia, Bavaria, Germany. It is bounded by (from the north and clockwise) the districts of Unterallgäu and Ostallgäu, the Austrian states Tyrol and Vorarlberg, the district of Lindau, and the state of Baden-Württemberg (district Ravensburg). The city of Kempten is enclosed by but does not belong to the district. The district includes natural features such as the Ursersberg.

== History ==
Human settlement dates back to the Bronze Age, when Celtic peoples inhabited the region. The Romans established a military camp which grew to become the city of Cambodunum, the present Kempten; it is consequently sometimes claimed that Kempten is the oldest town in Germany.

In medieval times Kempten was a free imperial city, and the surrounding lands became subordinate to the lords of Staufen and the counts of Rothenfels. Both ceased to exist in the beginning of the 19th century, when Napoleon handed these territories over to Bavaria.

The district of Oberallgäu was established in 1972 by merging the former districts of Sonthofen and Kempten.

== Geography ==
Oberallgäu is the southernmost district of Germany. "Oberallgäu" literally means "Upper Allgäu". The term Allgäu is applied to the part of the Alps located in Swabia and their northern foothills.

In the very south of the district are some of the highest mountains of the Allgäu, culminating in the Hochfrottspitze (2,649 m). Blender, which rises to 1,072 m, is located between the municipalities of Buchenberg and Wiggensbach. The Iller River (a tributary of the Danube) runs through the district from south to north.

== Coat of arms ==
The coat of arms displays a mountain symbolising the Allgäu, and three lions from the arms of the Staufen dynasty.

== Towns and municipalities ==
Clickable map of towns and municipalities in the district

Towns
1. Immenstadt
2. Sonthofen
Märkte
1. Altusried
2. Bad Hindelang
3. Buchenberg
4. Dietmannsried
5. Oberstaufen
6. Oberstdorf
7. Sulzberg
8. Wertach
9. Wiggensbach
Municipalities
1. Betzigau
2. Blaichach
3. Burgberg im Allgäu
4. Durach
5. Haldenwang
6. Lauben
7. Oy-Mittelberg
8. Rettenberg
9. Waltenhofen
10. Wildpoldsried

Verwaltungsgemeinschaften
1. Hörnergruppe; 1. Balderschwang; 2. Bolsterlang; 3. Fischen^{1}; 4. Obermaiselstein; 5. Ofterschwang	2. Weitnau; 1. Missen-Wilhams; 2. Weitnau^{1,2}
^{1}seat of the Verwaltungsgemeinschaft; ^{2}Markt

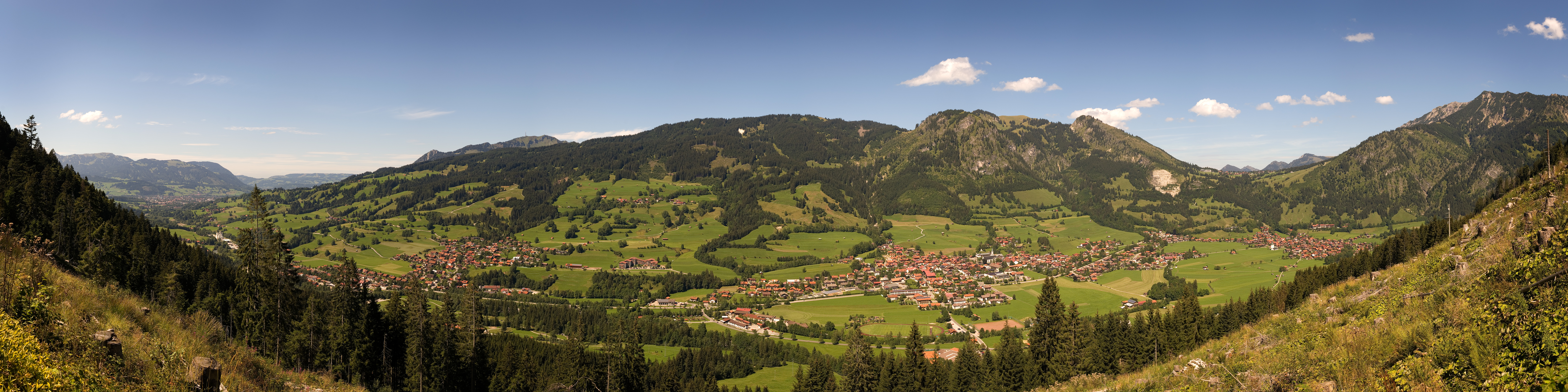
Panoramic of the municipality of Bad Hindelang
