= Aitrach (Iller) =

River in Baden-Württemberg, Germany

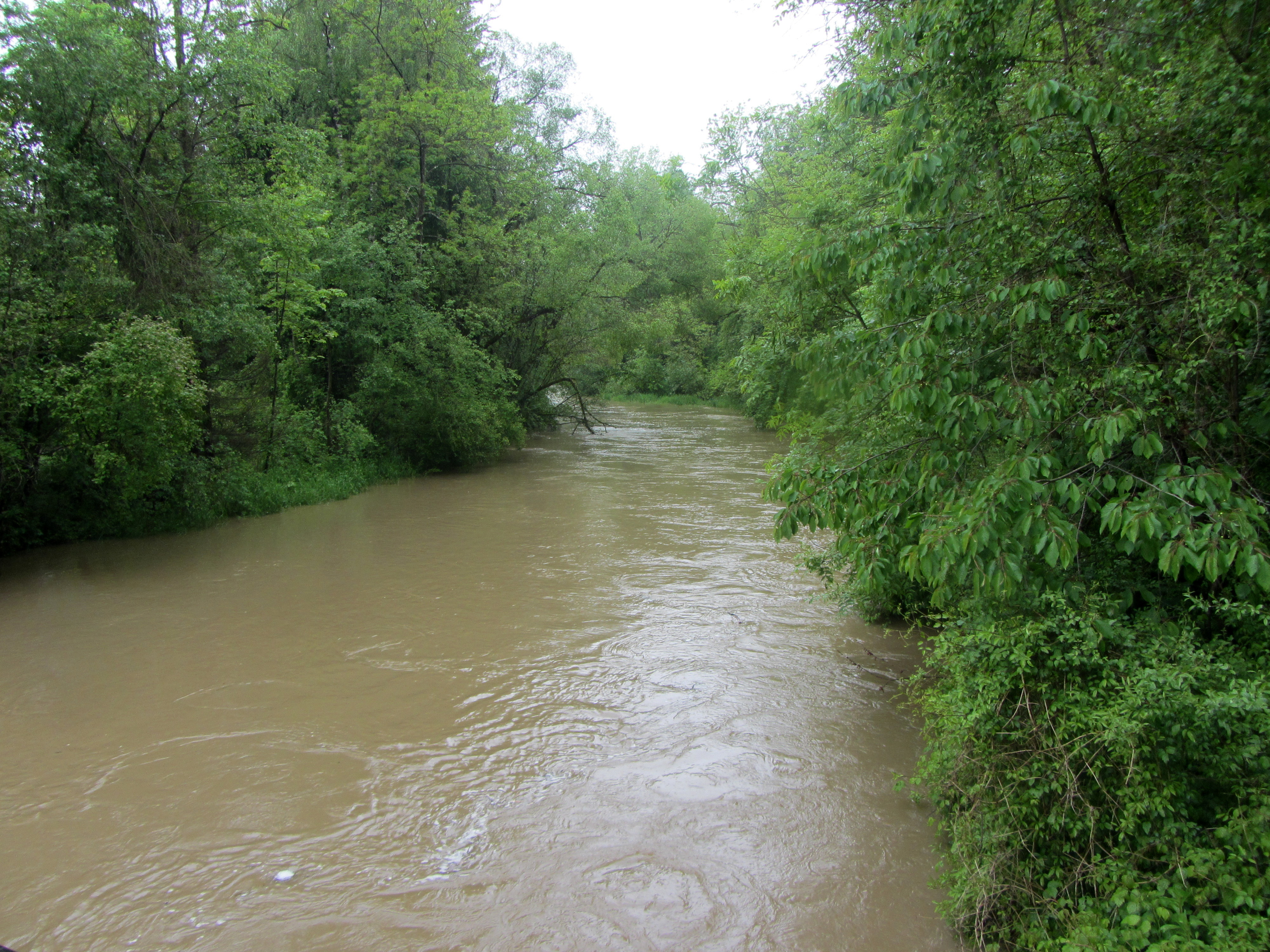
- The Aitrach during a flood

- Location of mouth

Location
- Country: Germany
- State: Baden-Württemberg

Physical characteristics
- Mouth
  - location: Iller
  - coordinates: 47.9622°N 10.0847°E
- Length: 39.6 km (24.6 mi)
- Basin size: 357 km^{2} (138 sq mi)

Basin features
- Progression: Iller→ Danube→ Black Sea

Aitrach is a river of Baden-Württemberg, Germany. It is formed at the confluence of the Wurzacher Ach and the Eschach near Leutkirch im Allgäu. It is a left tributary of the Iller, which it joins near the village Aitrach. Including the Wurzacher Ach, it is 39.6 km long.

== See also ==
- List of rivers of Baden-Württemberg
