= Buchenberg =

- Municipality
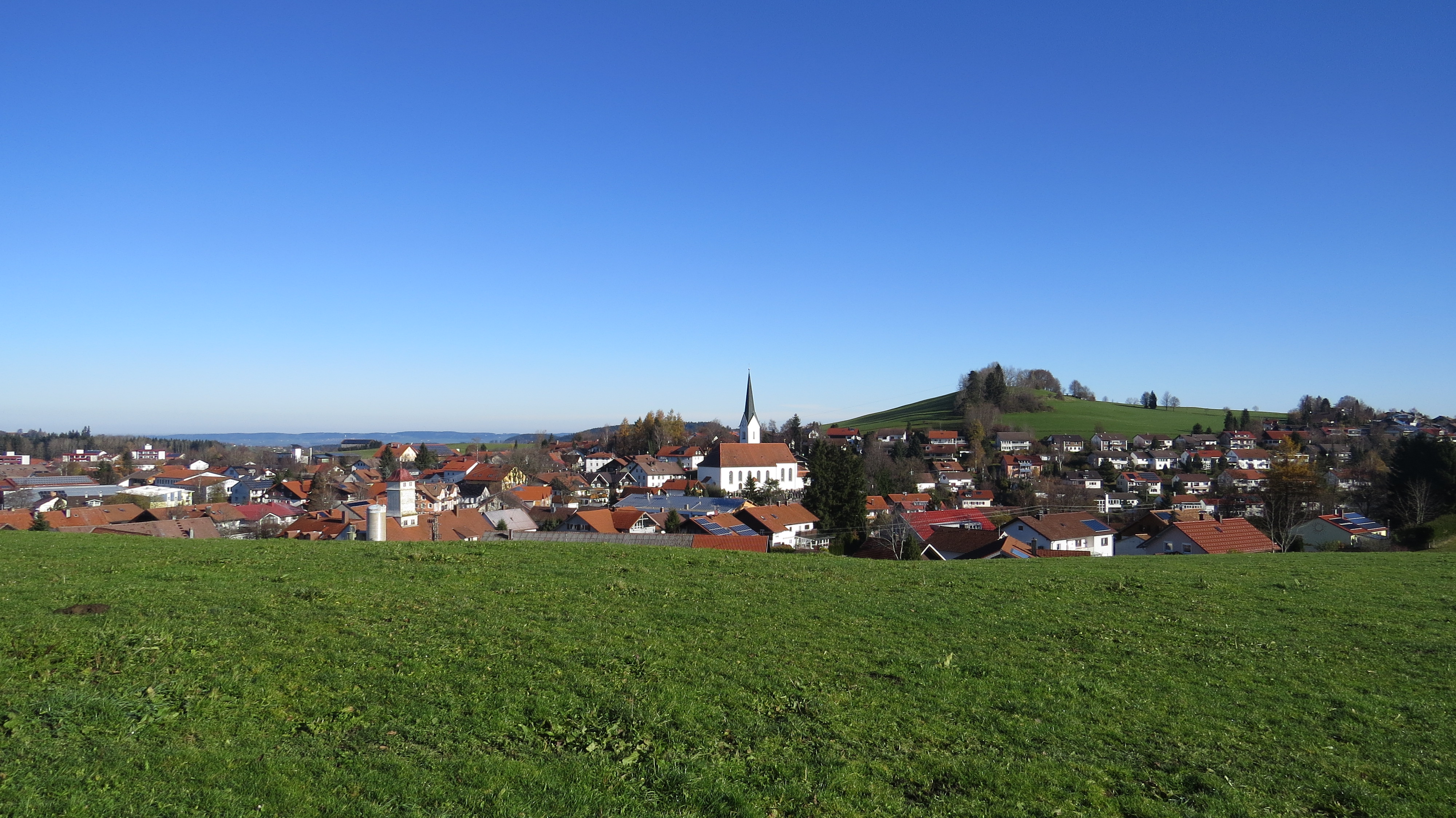
- Buchenberg seen from southwest

- Coat of arms

- Location of Buchenberg within Oberallgäu district
- Interactive map of Buchenberg
- Location within Germany Location within Bavaria
- Coordinates: 47°42′N 10°13′E
- Country: Germany
- State: Bavaria
- Admin. region: Schwaben
- District: Oberallgäu

Government
  - Mayor (2022–28): Toni Barth (CSU)

Area
  - Total: 58.17 km^{2} (22.46 sq mi)
- Elevation: 895 m (2,936 ft)

Population (2025-12-31)
  - Total: 4,126
  - Density: 70.93/km^{2} (183.7/sq mi)
- Time zone: UTC+01:00 (CET)
  - Summer (DST): UTC+02:00 (CEST)
- Postal codes: 87474
- Dialling codes: 08378, 17569, 18370
- Vehicle registration: OA
- Website: www.buchenberg.de

Buchenberg (German pronunciation: [ˈbuːxn̩bɛʁk]) is a municipality in the district of Oberallgäu in Bavaria in Germany.
