= Eschach (Aitrach) =

River in Germany

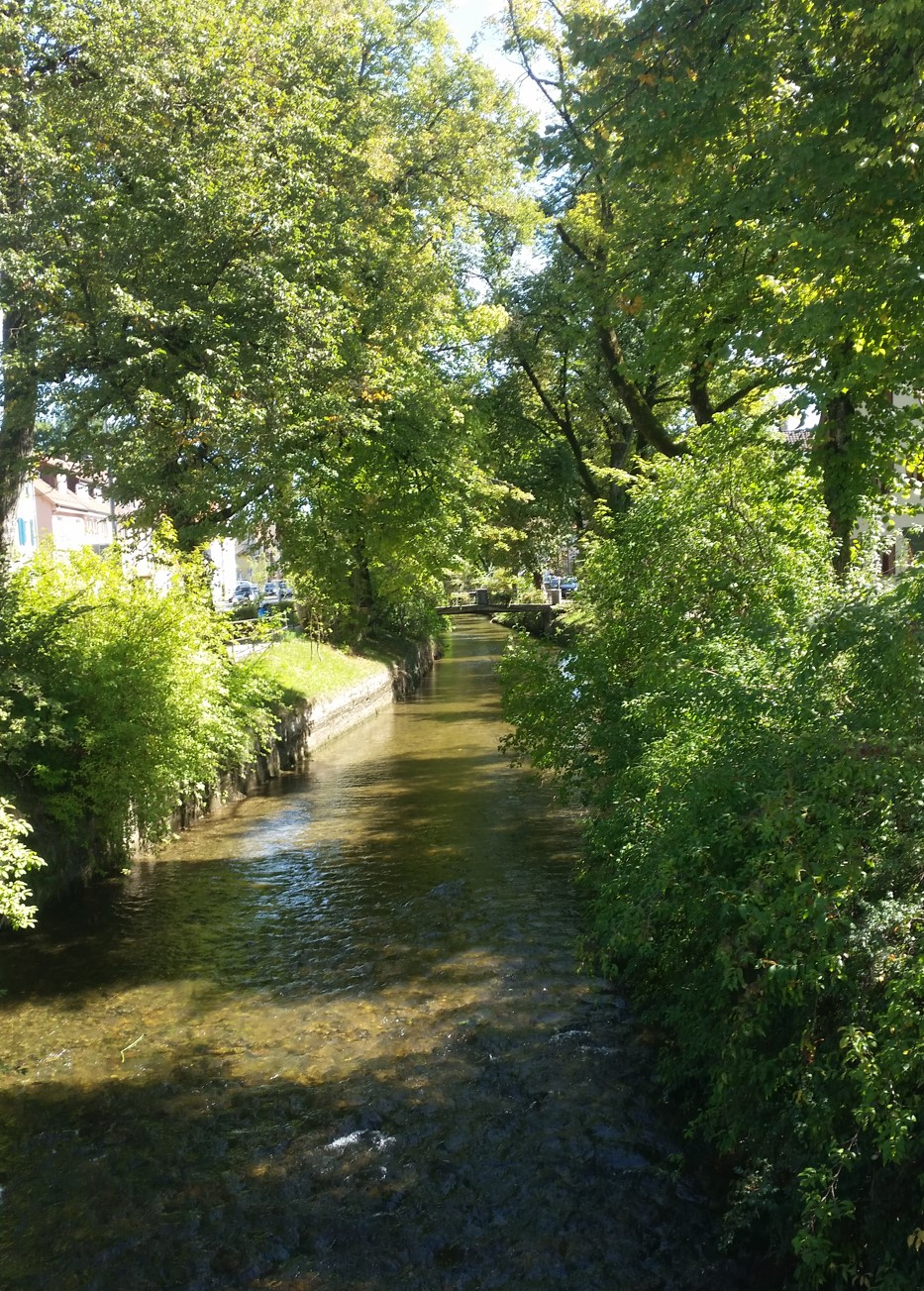
- The Eschach in Leutkirch

Location
- Country: Germany
- States: Baden-Württemberg and Bavaria

Physical characteristics
- Mouth
  - location: Aitrach
  - coordinates: 47.8710°N 10.0318°E
- Length: 34.7 km (21.6 mi)
- Basin size: 133 km^{2} (51 sq mi)

Basin features
- Progression: Aitrach→ Iller→ Danube→ Black Sea

Eschach (German pronunciation: [ˈɛʃax]) is a river of Baden-Württemberg and of Bavaria, Germany. It is a right headwater of the Aitrach near Leutkirch im Allgäu.

== See also ==
- List of rivers of Baden-Württemberg
