= Biberach (Landtag electoral district) =

State electoral district of Germany

66: Biberach
- Electoral district for the Landtag of Baden-Württemberg
- Biberach in 2026
- District: Biberach
- Electorate: 134,636 (2026)
- Major settlements: Achstetten, Alleshausen, Allmannsweiler, Altheim, Attenweiler, Bad Buchau, Bad Schussenried, Betzenweiler, Biberach an der Riß, Burgrieden, Dürmentingen, Dürnau, Eberhardzell, Erlenmoos, Ertingen, Gutenzell-Hürbel, Hochdorf, Ingoldingen, Kanzach, Langenenslingen, Laupheim, Maselheim, Mietingen, Mittelbiberach, Moosburg, Ochsenhausen, Oggelshausen, Riedlingen, Schemmerhofen, Schwendi, Seekirch, Steinhausen an der Rottum, Tiefenbach, Ummendorf, Unlingen, Uttenweiler, Wain, and Warthausen

Current electoral district
- Party: CDU
- Member: Thomas Dörflinger

Biberach is an electoral constituency (German: Wahlkreis) represented in the Landtag of Baden-Württemberg.

Since 2026, it has elected one member via first-past-the-post voting. Voters cast a second vote under which additional seats are allocated proportionally state-wide. Under the constituency numbering system, it is designated as constituency 66.

It is wholly within the district of Biberach.

== Geography ==
The constituency includes the municipalities of Achstetten, Alleshausen, Allmannsweiler, Altheim, Attenweiler, Bad Buchau, Bad Schussenried, Betzenweiler, Biberach an der Riß, Burgrieden, Dürmentingen, Dürnau, Eberhardzell, Erlenmoos, Ertingen, Gutenzell-Hürbel, Hochdorf, Ingoldingen, Kanzach, Langenenslingen, Laupheim, Maselheim, Mietingen, Mittelbiberach, Moosburg, Ochsenhausen, Oggelshausen, Riedlingen, Schemmerhofen, Schwendi, Seekirch, Steinhausen an der Rottum, Tiefenbach, Ummendorf, Unlingen, Uttenweiler, Wain, and Warthausen within the district of Biberach.

There were 134,636 eligible voters in 2026.

== Members ==
=== First mandate ===
Both prior to and since the electoral reforms for the 2026 election, the winner of the plurality of the vote (first-past-the-post) in every constituency won the first mandate.

Election	Member	Party	%
1976	Wilfried Steuer	CDU	
1980	Wilfried Steuer	CDU	
1984	Wilfried Steuer	CDU	
1988	Wilfried Steuer	CDU	
1992	Gerd Scheffold	CDU	
1996	Gerd Scheffold	CDU	
2001	Peter Schneider	CDU	
2006	Peter Schneider	CDU	50.6
2011	Peter Schneider	CDU	50.7
2016	Thomas Dörflinger	CDU	35.9
2021	Thomas Dörflinger	CDU	34.1
2026	Thomas Dörflinger	CDU	46.4

=== Second mandate ===
Prior to the electoral reforms for the 2026 election, the seats in the state parliament were allocated proportionately amongst parties which received more than 5% of valid votes across the state. The seats that were won proportionally for parties that did not win as many first mandates as seats they were entitled to, were allocated to their candidates which received the highest proportion of the vote in their respective constituencies. This meant that following some elections, a constituency would have one or more members elected under a second mandate.

Prior to 2011, these second mandates were allocated to the party candidates who got the greatest number of votes, whilst from 2011-2021, these were allocated according to percentage share of the vote.

As the CDU won overhang seats in 1976, 1980, and 1984 within the Tübingen administrative district, this constituency returned members for both the first mandates and second mandates - the later of which were awarded to the substitute candidates.

Election	Member	Party
1976	Franz Baum	SPD
1980	Franz Baum	SPD
1984	Franz Baum	SPD
1988		
1992
1996	Josef Huchler	REP
2001		
2006	Oswald Metzger	Grüne
Nov 2007	Oswald Metzger	Ind
Feb 2008	Eugen Schlachter	Grüne
2011		
2016
2021

== Election results ==
=== 2026 election ===
State election (2026): Biberach
Notes:	Blue background denotes the winner of the electorate vote. Pink background denotes a candidate elected from their party list. Yellow background denotes an electorate win by a list member, or other incumbent. A ✓ or ✗ denotes status of any incumbent, win or lose respectively.						
Party	Candidate	Votes	%	±%	Party votes	%	±%
CDU	✓ Thomas Dörflinger	45,133	46.4	▲12.3	38,074	39.1	▲5.0
AfD	Paula Gulde	20,317	20.9	▲10.9	20,896	21.5	▲11.5
Greens	Berat Gürbüz	15,940	16.4	▼12.5	22,394	23.0	▼5.9
SPD	Simon Özkeleş	5,546	5.7	▼0.1	3,463	3.6	▼2.3
FW	Reinhold Bopp	3,288	3.4	Steady	2,203	2.3	▼1.1
FDP	Oliver Lukner	2,983	3.1	▼5.1	3,494	3.6	▼4.5
Left	Jasmin Weber	2,639	2.7	▲0.6	2,395	2.5	▲0.3
BSW					1,109	1.1	
APT					878	0.9	
Volt	Karolin Werkmann	1,014	1.0	▲0.5	633	0.7	▲0.1
Pirates	Samuel Schmid	338	0.3	▼0.2			
PARTEI					331	0.3	▼1.3
ÖDP					287	0.3	▼2.0
dieBasis					278	0.3	▼1.1
Pensioners					167	0.2	
Values					167	0.2	
Bündnis C					166	0.2	
Team Todenhöfer					83	0.1	
Verjüngungsforschung					79	0.1	
PdF					72	0.1	
KlimalisteBW					49	0.1	▼0.5
Humanists					43	0.0	
Informal votes		690			627		
Total valid votes		97,198			97,261		
Turnout		97,888	72.7	▲7.6			
CDU hold	Majority	24,816	25.5				

== See also ==
- Politics of Baden-Württemberg
- Landtag of Baden-Württemberg
