= Bad Buchau =

- Town
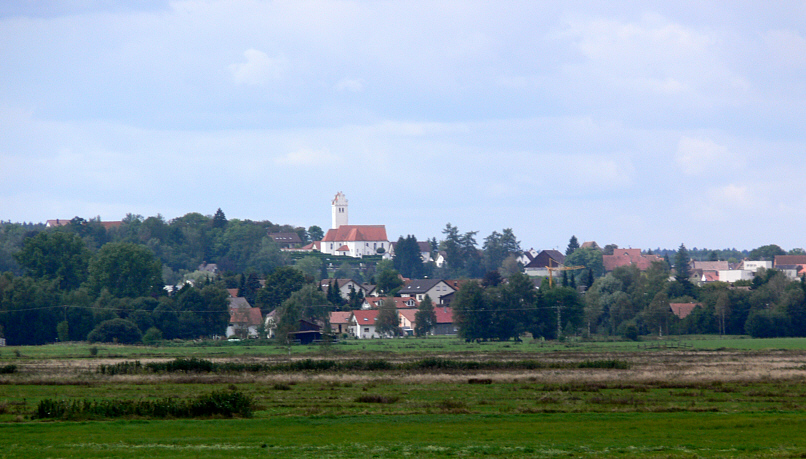

- Coat of arms

- Location of Bad Buchau within Biberach district
- Interactive map of Bad Buchau
- Location within Germany Location within Baden-Württemberg
- Coordinates: 48°3′58″N 9°36′36″E
- Country: Germany
- State: Baden-Württemberg
- Admin. region: Tübingen
- District: Biberach

Government
  - Mayor (2018–26): Peter Diesch

Area
  - Total: 23.75 km^{2} (9.17 sq mi)
- Elevation: 592 m (1,942 ft)

Population (2025-12-31)
  - Total: 4,622
  - Density: 194.6/km^{2} (504.0/sq mi)
- Time zone: UTC+01:00 (CET)
  - Summer (DST): UTC+02:00 (CEST)
- Postal codes: 88422
- Dialling codes: 07582
- Vehicle registration: BC
- Website: www.badbuchau.de

Bad Buchau (German pronunciation: [ˌbaːt ˈbʊːxaʊ]; formerly Buchau; Swabian: Buacha) is a small town in the district of Biberach, Baden-Württemberg, Germany with about 4,000 inhabitants. It is situated near Lake Federsee, which is separated from the town by a wide reed belt.

Bad Buchau incorporates the nine villages of Allmannsweiler, Dürnau, Kanzach, Betzenweiler, Moosburg, Alleshausen, Seekirch, Tiefenbach, and Oggelshausen, as well as the outlying farm settlements of Ottobeurer Hof, Bruckhof, and Henauhof. Also part of Bad Buchau is the formerly independent district of Kappel.

The official language is German, with day-to-day conversations by the majority of its inhabitants in the Swabian dialect.

From the 13th century to the mediatisation of 1803, Buchau had the particularity of being the seat of both an Imperial Abbey and a Free Imperial City, independent of each other. In terms of area, it was one of the smallest such self-ruling cities and its island situation eliminated the necessity to erect city walls and towers. Buchau, however, lost its insular benefits after the water level of Lake Federsee had been lowered on two occasions.

== History ==
- AD 770 – Buchau Abbey was founded in by the Frankish Count Warin and his wife Adelindis von Buchau, from whom the present "Adelindisfest" takes its name. The church still serves as the parish church.
- 819 and 857 – Grants for the Abbey are received from the Frankish Kings Louis the Pious and Louis the German respectively.
- 902 – The three sons of countess Adelindis, Gerhard, Beringer and Reginolf, are killed when attempting to abduct their sister, the Abbess Adelindis, from Buchau's Abbey in order to get her married. Countess Adelindis joins the Abbey in order to atone for her sons' deed and is to this day admired as a great Benefactrix and Saint of the people. She rests together with her slain sons in the crypt of the collegiate church.
- 1014 or 1022 – A mint and market is mentioned by the Abbey. Buchau appears for the first time as a "Freie Reichsstadt" (Free imperial city).
- 1417 – The Abbey is declared a secular convent and accepts daughters of the Swabian nobility.

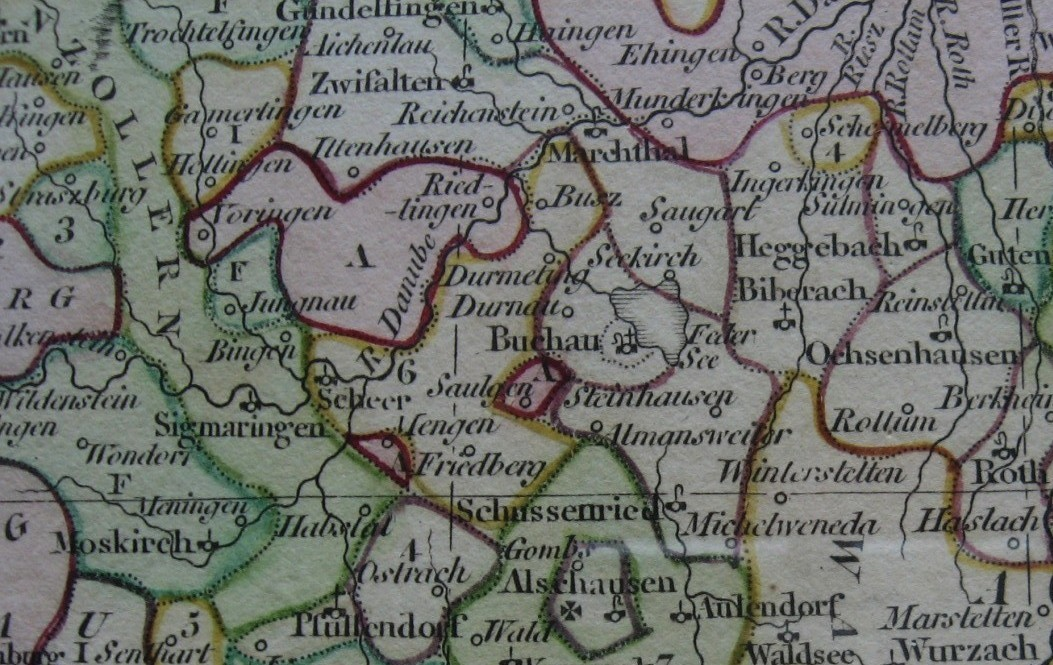
Location of the Imperial Abbey and the Free Imperial City of Buchau

- 1577 – The Free Imperial City hosts a Jewish Community, which quickly gains prominence under the protection of the city.
- 1650 – A Jewish cemetery is constructed.
- 1730 and 1837 – Erection of a synagogue for the growing Jewish community.
- 1774–1776 – The style of the collegiate church is transformed from Gothic to French classicism.
- 1787 and 1808 – Lake Federsee's level is lowered, yet hopes to gain farm land in this manner are dashed, though roads can now be constructed.
- 1802/1803 – Both the Imperial Abbey and the Free Imperial City lose their independence during the course of the German mediatisation. They become the property of the Prince of Thurn and Taxis by decree of the Regensburg parliament "Reichstag von Regensburg".
- 1806 – Buchau becomes a township of the kingdom of Württemberg.
- 1807 – The Jewish community acquires the right to acquire goods.
- 1828 – The Jewish community acquires their civil liberties.
- 1847 – Hermann Einstein, father of Albert Einstein, is born.
- 1896–1917 – The narrow-gauge railway Schussenried – Buchau – Riedlingen is being built as a feeder line to and from the main railroad line.

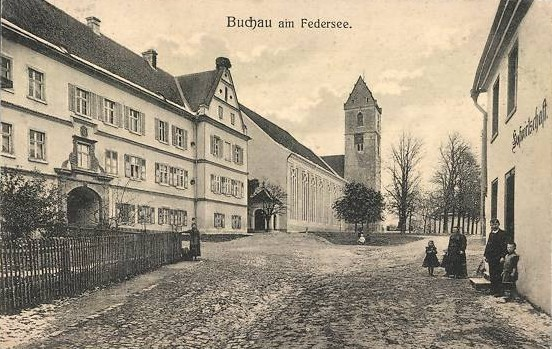
The convent and abbey church in the late 19th century

- 1911 – The boardwalk is installed, which leads to Lake Federsee by intersecting a wide reed belt. Buchau and the Lake Federsee area are quickly becoming well known through archaeological digs in the moor. Noteworthy is the unearthing of the Waterfortress Buchau "Wasserburg Buchau", a settlement from the late Bronze Age (1100-800 BC). Establishment of the Wildlife Preserve Federsee, which today presents the largest turf moor wildlife preserve in Baden-Wuerttemberg.
- 1935 – Saulgau-Earthquake damages 200 buildings and collapses the pediment of St. Peter and Paul church in Kappel
- 1938 – During the Kristallnacht Pogrom, the synagogue is set on fire, the mayor ordered the fire department to extinguish the burning synagogue. The next night, however, the arson was repeated. The synagogue's stone blocks were sold and used for road construction.
- 1941–45 – The Jewish people of Buchau, who had made up a substantial part of the population, were deported to Nazi extermination camps. Only 4 returned after the Second World War.
- 1949 – Opening of the civic spa.
- 1963 – Buchau receives the title of "Bad" ("Spa") and is henceforth known as Bad Buchau
- 1968 – The new Federseemuseum opened, with extraordinary exhibits relating to the Stone Age and Bronze Age. The area is rich in archaeological artifacts from this era.

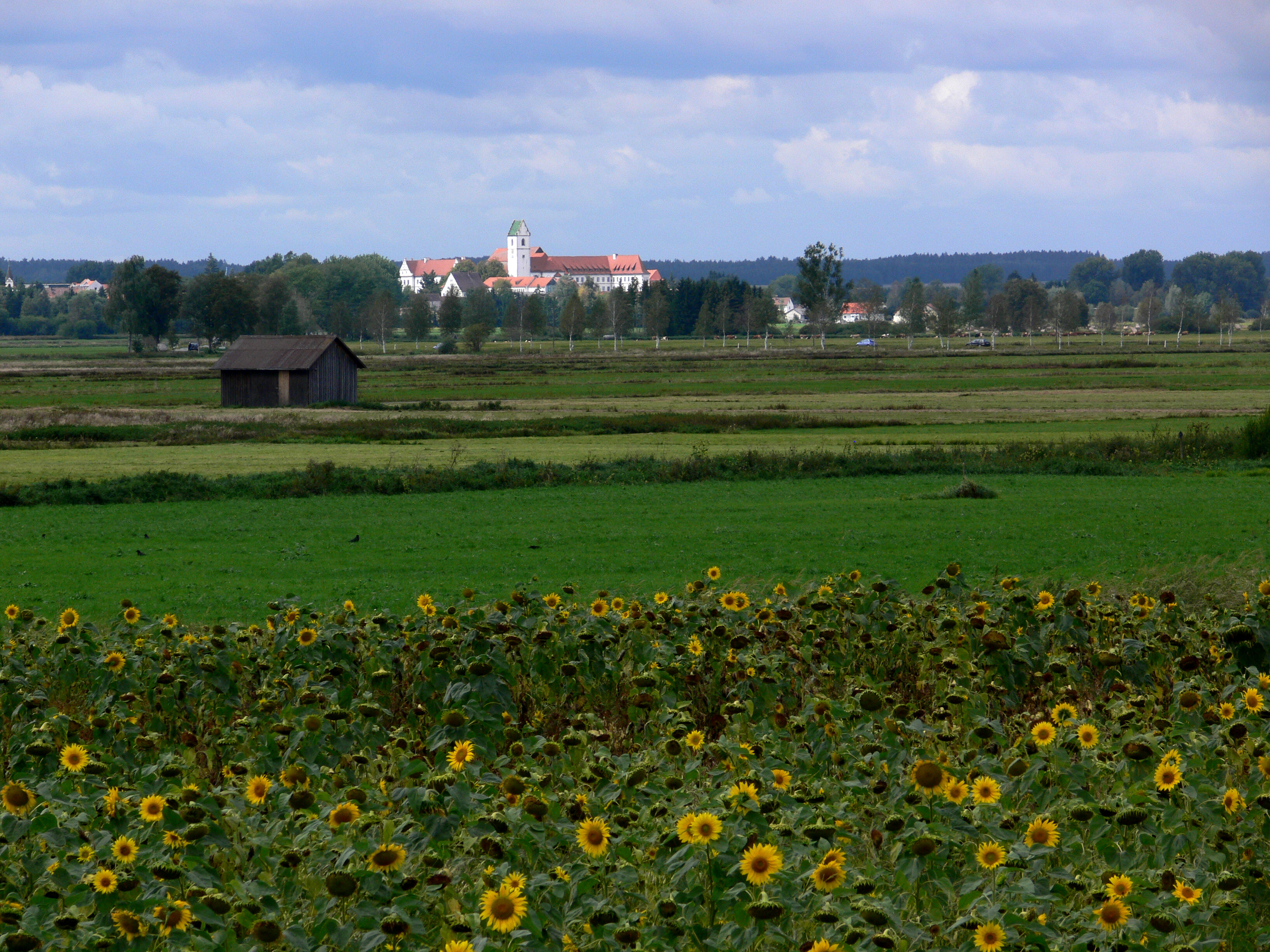
View of the abbey complex

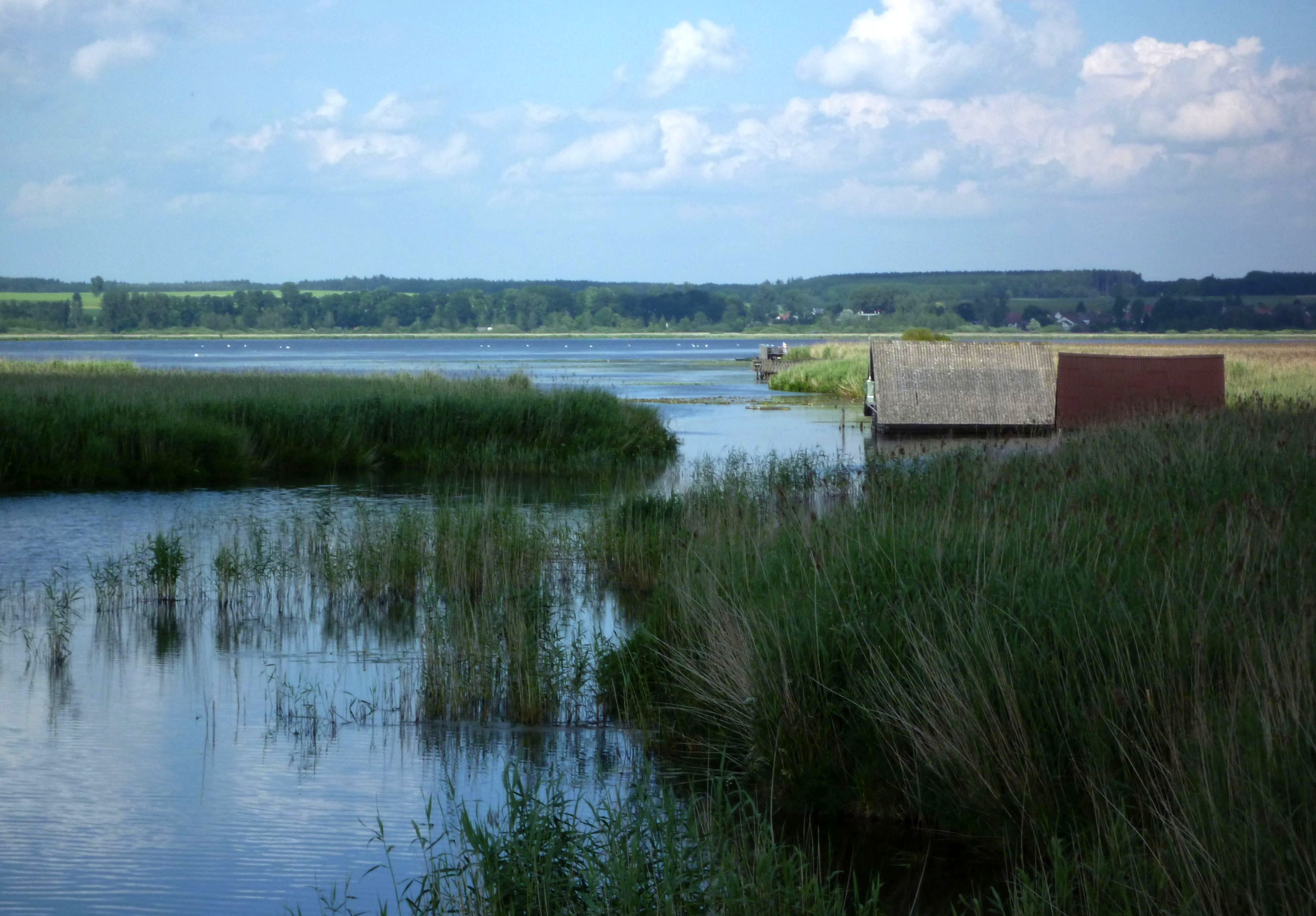
View of the Federsee from Bad Buchau

- 1969 – The narrow-gauge railroad line is ultimately retired.
- 1963–1998 – Expansion of Bad Buchau's Spa with a thermal spring and large spa gardens.

== Mayors ==
- 1948–1978: Hans Knittel
- 1979–2003: Harald Müller
- 1 February 2003 – present: Peter Diesch

== World Heritage Site ==
The prehistoric settlement at Siedlung Forschner is part of the Prehistoric Pile dwellings around the Alps a UNESCO World Heritage Site.

== Other ==
The most prominent company is Franz Kessler GmbH, based in Bad Buchau's light industrial area of Kappel.

== Notable residents ==
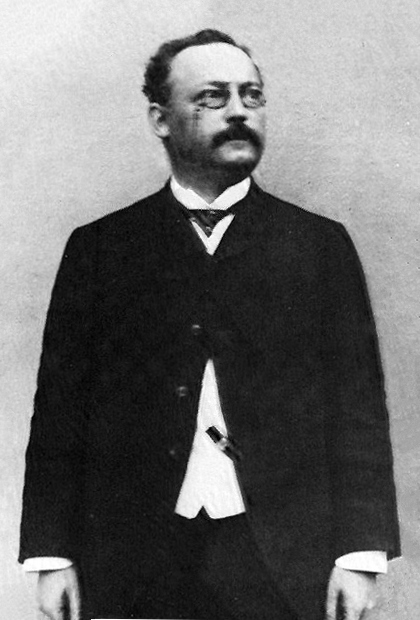
Hermann Einstein

- Karoline Kaulla (1739–1809), court Jew, working at the Württemberg court
- Hermann Einstein (1847–1902), entrepreneur and father of Albert Einstein
- Hans Kayser (1891–1964), composer and music theorist
