= Xaver Hohenleiter =

German criminal (1778-1819)

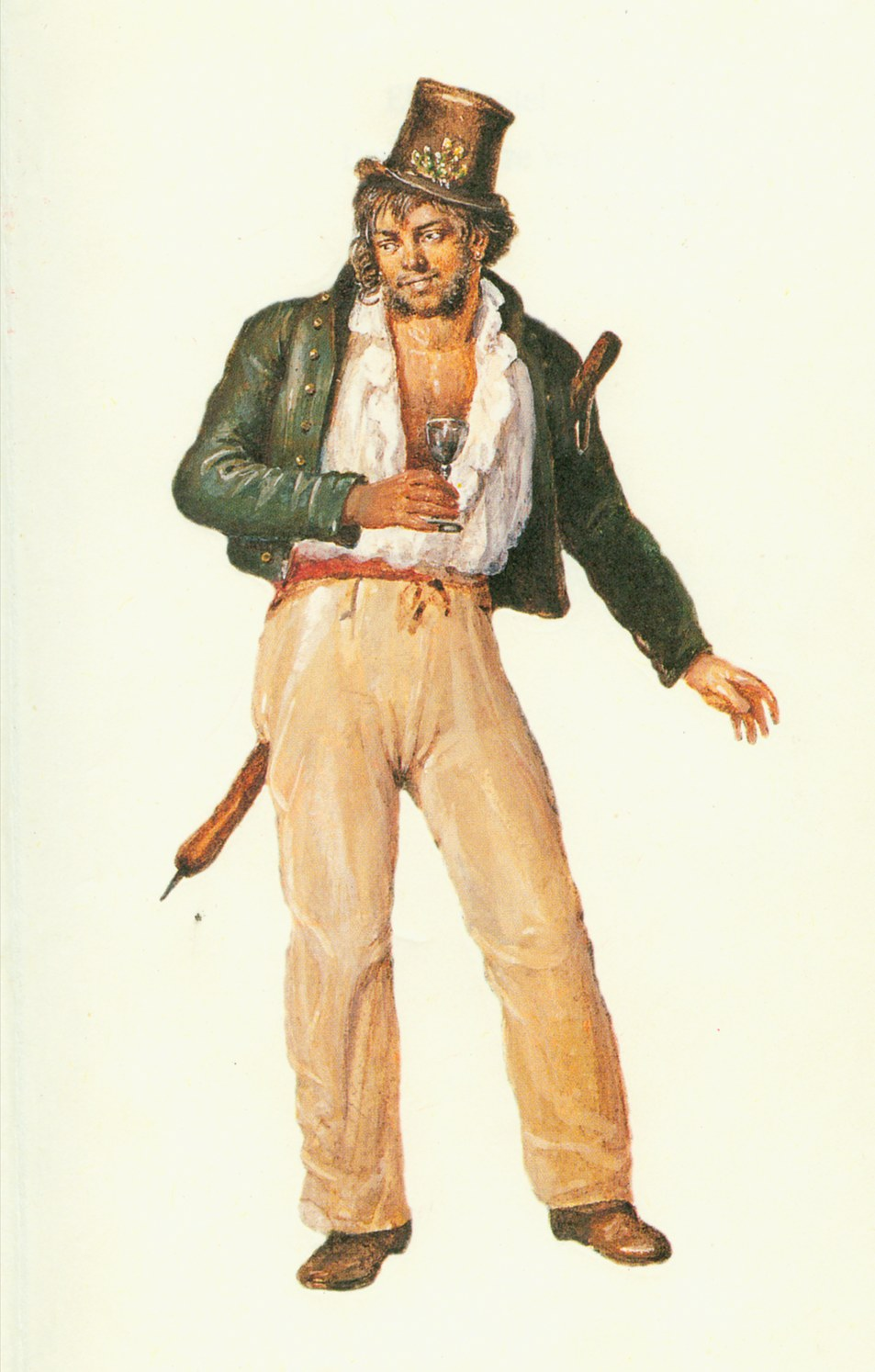
- Born: 1788; Rommelsried
- Died: 20 July 1819 (aged 30–31); Biberach an der Riss
- Cause of death: Lightning strike
- Other names: Schwarze Veri, Schwarzen-Veere, Schwarzer Vere, Schwarze Vere, Schwaaz Vere, Schwarz Vere, Vere

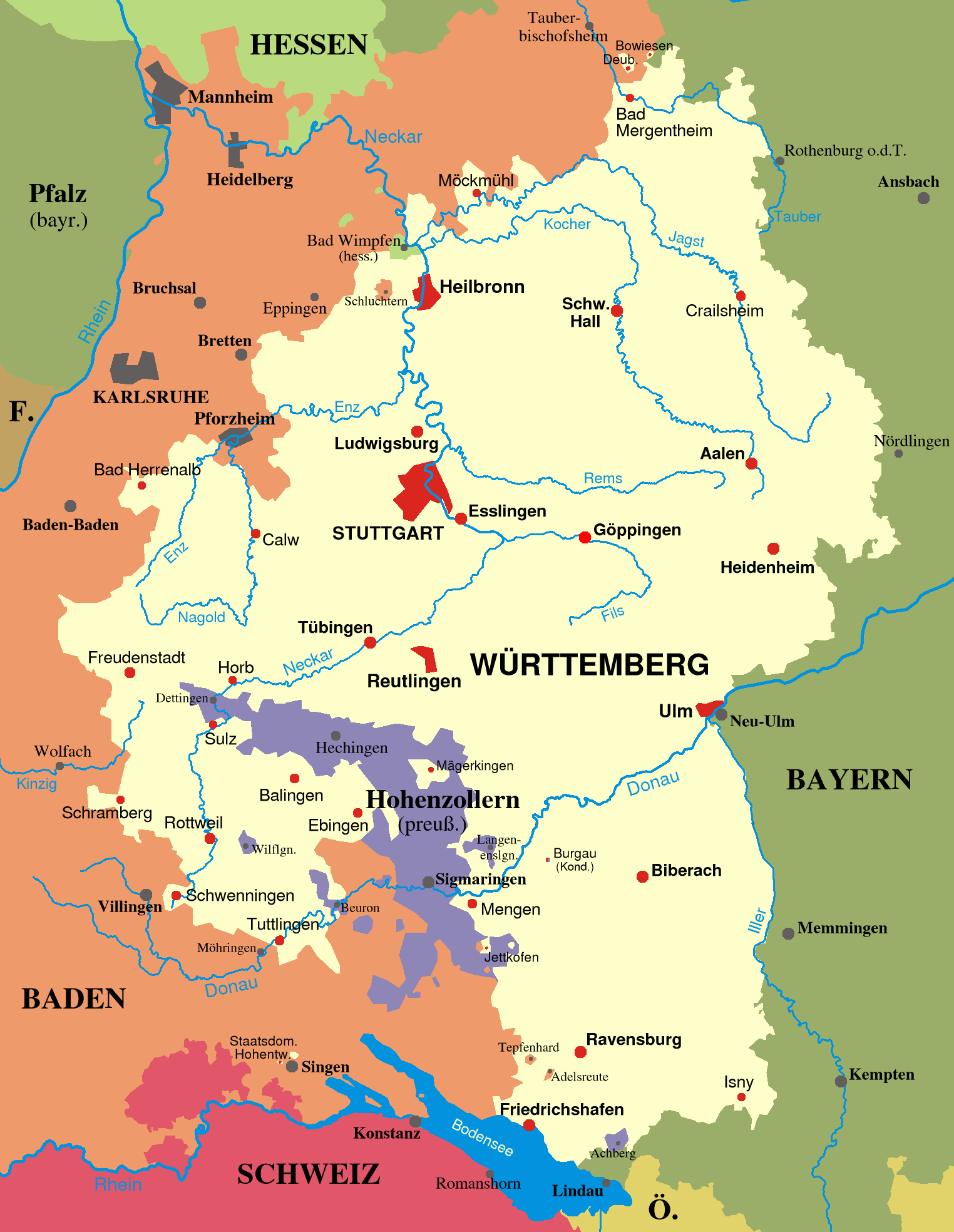
Kingdom of Württemberg, Hohenzollern Province and part of the Grand Duchy of Baden in the 19th century

Franz Xaver Hohenleiter (also known as Schwarze Veri, Schwarzen-Veere, Schwarzer Vere, Schwarze Vere or in Swabian dialect as Schwaaz Vere, Schwarz Vere or Vere; 1788 – 20 July 1819) was a German criminal. As a leader of a band of robbers, he was active between 1817 and 1819 in the border regions of the Kingdom of Württemberg, the Grand Duchy of Baden and the Principality of Hohenzollern-Sigmaringen.

== Background ==
The period towards the end of and immediately after the Napoleonic Wars resulted in the uprooting of a large number of people, mostly peasants. Combined with the reorganisation of Southern Germany's political map, the mediatisation of smaller formerly independent territories, which in some cases changed hands several times before being incorporated into larger entities (the Kingdom of Württemberg, the Grand Duchy of Baden, the Kingdom of Bavaria, the Principality of Hohenzollern-Sigmaringen and the Principality of Hohenzollern-Hechingen), led to a period of unstable administration of these territories. Furthermore, the Year Without a Summer in 1816 caused famine and an increase in unrest, vagrancy, begging, robbery and the first wave of large scale German emigration to the United States.

== Early life ==
Franz Xaver Hohenleiter was born to impoverished herders in Rommelsried, now part of the municipality of Kutzenhausen in the district of Augsburg, Bavaria. His father had been a soldier and became a herder after getting married. The family had a bad reputation and had been convicted of theft. As a child Franz Xaver Hohenleiter worked as a shepherd boy but managed to get one winter of schooling where he learned to read printed texts, although with difficulties, and write his own name. In 1813, he signed up with the Bavarian Army in Augsburg only to desert after eight days, when he moved into territory controlled by the Austrian Empire, knowing that Austria would not extradite deserters. During the following years he led a restless life. He wandered about in Austria, Switzerland, Bavaria, Baden, Sigmaringen and Württemberg, begging or finding casual work as a farm hand.

== Appearance ==
Xaver Hohenleiter is reported to have been over six feet tall. His body was muscular, and his posture and gait revealed the former soldier. His face was sun-tanned and he had very white teeth. His face was engulfed by thick sideburns and a goatee. His hair was pitch black, dangling down in braids, hence his nickname Schwaaz Vere (Black Xaver). He also wore finely engraved earrings.

== The gang ==
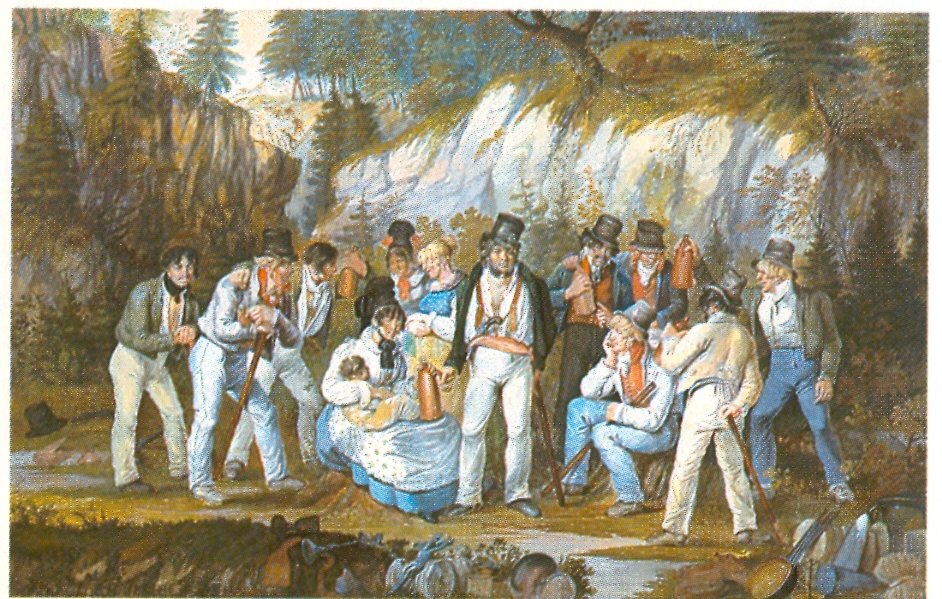
Schwaaz Vere and his robber band by Johann Baptist Pflug

Xaver Hohenleiter was the leader of a gang of outlaws whose number fluctuated over time. Its core, however, consisted of a number of persons, both male and female: Maria Josepha Tochtermann, called Die Günzburger Sephe (Günzburg Sephe), born at Eppishofen, now part of the municipality of Altenmünster, was the common-law wife of Xaver Hohenleiter. Together they had a son. Xaver Hohenleiter's brother Ulrich, called Der Urle, 17 years old at the time of his arrest, had previously been a member of the Rosenberg-Gang, also active in Upper Swabia during the same period, and was partner to Agatha Gebhard, whose nickname was Schwarze Agath (Black Agatha). She was part of a trio of women called Dreckete Partie (Dirty Party). Michael Friedrich Ludwig Klump, Der schöne Fritz (Handsome Fritz), was born in 1790 in Besenfeld and was associated with Theresia Jeppler, born in the Austrian coastal city of Trieste in 1788. Joseph Anton Jung, called Der Condeer (The Pedlar), due to his parents having been travelling merchants from what was to become the Rhine Province, and Creszentia Tochtermann, called Die Günzburger Creszenz (Günzburg Creszenz), sister of Maria Josepha Tochtermann, formed another couple within the gang. She was also part of the Dreckete Partie (Dirty Party) as was Crescentia Gebhard, nicknamed Dreckete Crescens (Dirty Crescentia) and Agnes Gebhard, called Dreckete Agnes (Dirty Agnes), the first girl-friend of Ulrich Hohenleiter, as well as Katharina Gebhard, called Die dreckete Mutter (The Dirty Mother), mother of Agatha, Agnes and Crescentia Gebhard. Other members of the gang were Fidelis Sohm, Der Einäugige Fidele (One-eyed Fidele), Franz Merkle, Weberen Franz (Weaver Franz), born in 1797 in Bellershausen, now part of the municipality of Diebach in Middle Franconia, Sebastian Kellermann, called Baste who was from Burgau, Christian Maucher, a tailor from Bußmannshausen (now part of the municipality of Schwendi, and hence nicknamed Bometshauser Schneiderle (Bußmannshausen Tailor), Ottila Hunsinger, Vetters Ottl from Seekirch, and Fidelis Gindele, Dicker Roter Metzger (Fat Red Butcher), born in 1788 in Ergetsweiler, now part of the municipality of Fronreute.

Various other vagrants were part of the gang, each for a short period of time before relocating, getting arrested or joining other criminal gangs.

== Crimes ==
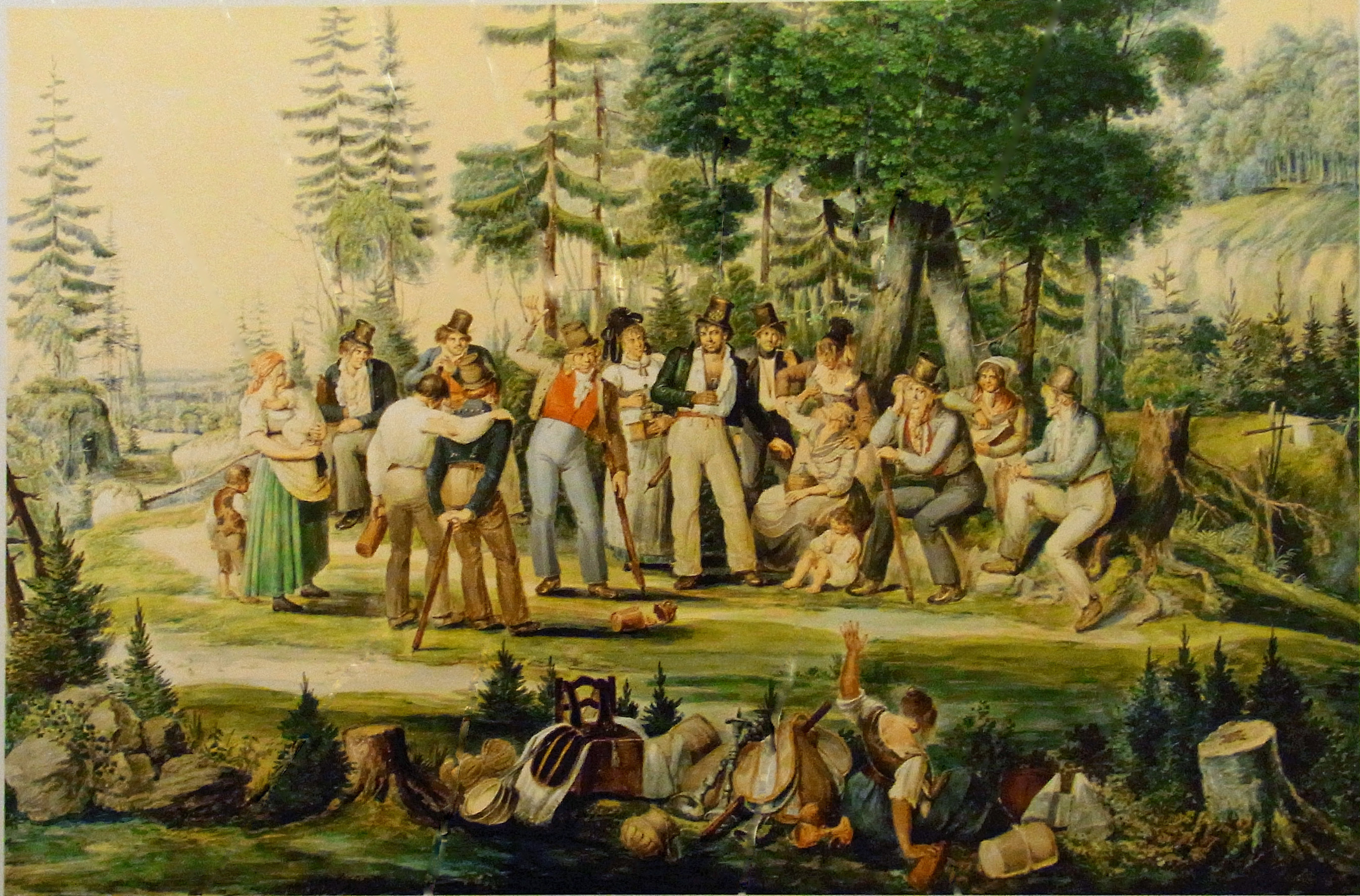
Hohenleiter and his gang by Johann Baptist Pflug

The crimes perpetrated by Hohenleiter and his gang were mostly arson, burglary, robbery, extortion and theft. They predominantly targeted isolated farms, smallholdings, hamlets and mills, their loot mostly consisting of food, animals, money and clothes. After committing crimes, Hohenleiter and his companions retreated into the dense woods where they had a base near Ostrach, and occasionally resurfaced at disreputable country inns.

The first reported incident attributed to Hohenleiter and his gang was the torching of a mill close to the village of Betzenweiler on 18 December 1817. The same night they also attempted to burgle the mayor of Neufra's house. However, they were disturbed and left without any loot. During 1818 they committed several burglaries in the hamlets of Unterweiler and Waldbeuren, both in the vicinity of Ostrach, as well as in Bellamont, robbing the meat of a whole pig, clothes to the value of 10 guldens, more than 10 litres of brandy, 70 pounds of lard and bread worth 39 guldens. In 1818 the gang also stole a pig, weighing three hundredweight, from an isolated farmstead near Offingen. During this robbery firearms were used to scare off the farmer who wanted to intervene and prevent the loss of his pig. A few days later the gang raided an isolated farm, Argenhardter Hof, in the vicinity of Tettnang in order to steal money from an old widow who was rumoured to be in the possession of 500 guldens. They threatened the woman to shoot her if she would not surrender the money. This having no effect they began to torture the victim by cutting first her clothes with a knife and then beating her up whereupon the woman fainted. The gang then proceeded to clear the house of all moveable and easily to carry items, mostly food, brandy, beddings and linen, worth more than 400 guldens. Of actual money they only found three Reichsthaler and two guldens. The victim was then bound and shoved through a trapdoor into the cellar. On hearing that the robbers were departing the woman managed to escape only to be caught by two members of the gang who had stayed behind to guard the retreat of the others, and was once more assaulted, bound and locked up in the cellar. Even though the victim freed herself again and managed to alert neighbours of the robbery, the ordeal seemed to have been too much for her so that she died three months later. In the autumn of 1818 the gang perpetrated a robbery which was later called the "Theft of the Ox in Boots". A farmer had harnessed an ox and a horse to his cart and left them at the edge of a forest whilst trying to retrieve wood from the forest. Hohenleiter and Merkle, noticing the unguarded team, untied the ox and, after having led it away some distance, pulled boots over the hooves of the animal not to leave any traces behind. In 1819 the gang committed several more burglaries at Hüttenreute, where the booty was 4 hundredweights of meat worth 53 guldens, and at Wendenreute, where they managed to steal goods to the value of 140 guldens: five hundredweights of meat, flour, lard and a tin plate. During a burglary in Illwangen the gang's booty was 15 pounds of cheese, bread, brandy, a tablecloth and a pair of boots. This summary is not exhaustive and only exemplary of the criminal acts perpetrated by Schwaaz Vere and his partners in crime.

== Arrest and death ==
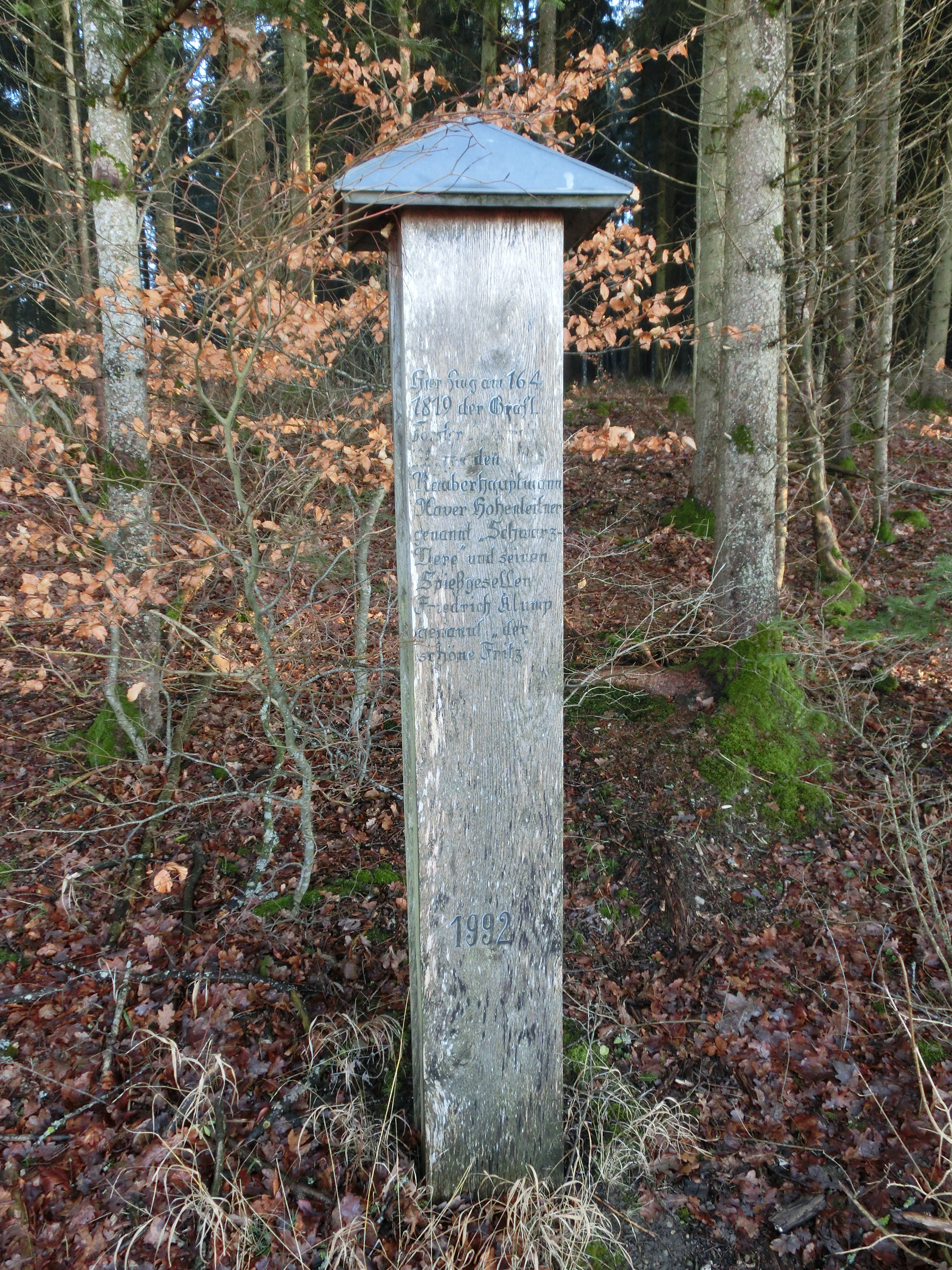
Commemorative pole near Ostrach at the place where Hohenleiter and his gang were arrested

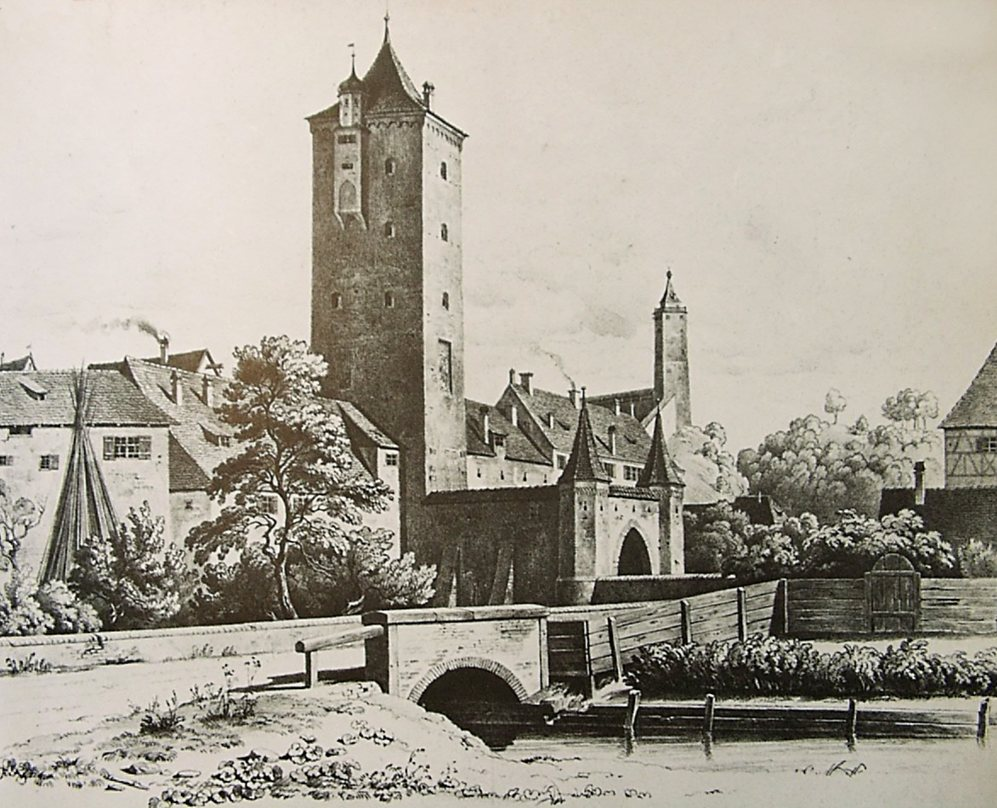
Tower of the Ehingen Gate in Biberach; place where Hohenleiter was held captive

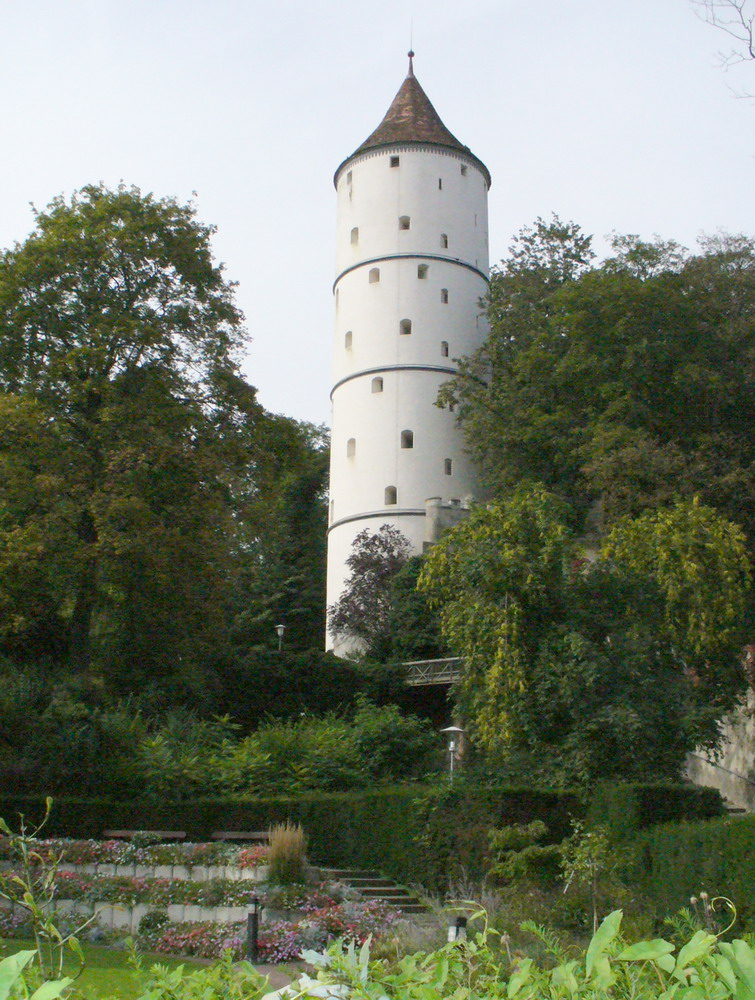
White Tower in Biberach

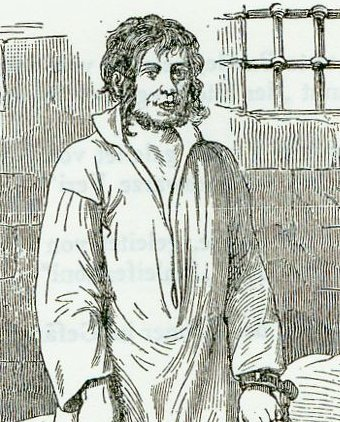
Xaver Hohenleiter in custody

In the early months of 1819, the Laubbach Mühle, a mill near Ostrach, had been plagued six times by Hohenleiter and his gang. Each time they were trying a break-in in order to get provisioned with food. After unsuccessfully trying to prevent burglaries by patrolling the area, foresters from Königseggwald changed tactics and laid an ambush at the mill in order to catch Hohenleiter and his gang. On 16 April 1819, Veri and his gang attempted another robbery at the mill during which they were caught in the act by the foresters. The criminals first escaped into the woods but were pursued by the foresters. Later on, the foresters surprised the gang, who were having a meal in the forest, and, after some shots were fired, arrested most of them whilst some managed to flee, only to be arrested by a Baden patrol three days later who incarcerated the lot of them. Only Joseph Anton Jung (The Pedlar) managed to escape and joined the "Rosenberger-Gang".

The arrested persons were taken to Biberach and imprisoned at various locations within the city. Some were held at the White Tower, whereas others were taken to the so-called Seelhaus ( an old building, originally owned by Beguines, then in the possession of the city), which had iron-barred windows on the ground floor. Xaver Hohenleiter, however, was incarcerated in the Ehingen Tower (Ehinger Turm), together with some of the women of his gang. Hohenleiter was locked up in a cell with a suspect from another band of robbers. Both were bound up in heavy chains. The chains led through a hole in the wall to a chimney upon which they were securely fastened. Four of Hohenleiter's companions managed to escape from captivity only to be caught after four weeks on the run near Kißlegg in the Allgäu. Franz Merkle remained a fugitive from the law for some considerable time and was only arrested in 1823 in Baden.

Investigations by the authorities commenced in May 1819 and lasted until 1821. Xaver Hohenleiter, however, never stood trial.

On the evening of 20 July 1819 a huge thunderstorm moved over Biberach. Lightning struck the Ehingen Tower and when the doors of the prison were opened, thick smoke billowed out of the cell where Hohenleiter was held and Xaver Hohenleiter was found lying dead on his pallet, having been struck by lightning. When his body was carried outside, his clothes caught fire. Any attempts to revive him proved futile as his injuries were too severe. The right side of his chest down to his loins was entirely burnt. The inner side of his right upper arm was torn up and the skin from his elbow down to his hand had completely disappeared. An investigation, consequently carried out to determine the cause of death of the arrestant, concluded that lightning first struck the weathervane, smashed the roof trusses, toppled the chimney and went down the chimney chase, shattering the fireplaces on the top and third floor without harming any of the inmates imprisoned there. However, it struck Hohenleiter with full force, the iron chain functioning as a conductor. The body of Xaver Hohenleiter was buried in the cemetery of the poorhouse on 21 July 1819. The grave has since been levelled.

== Fate of other members of the gang ==
Xaver Hohenleiter's brother Ulrich (Der Urle) died of tuberculosis in custody in 1820, being 19 years of age. On 8 May 1821 Fidele Gindele (The Red Butcher) also died of tuberculosis, whilst awaiting trial. He had been transferred to Gotteszell jail, formerly a nunnery, due to his illness. The remaining accused were sentenced in March 1824. Joseph Anton Jung (The Pedlar) and Fidelis Sohm (One-eyed Fidele) both received a life sentence. Joseph Anton Jung received a royal pardon in 1842 and died in Ellwangen (now part of Rot an der Rot) in 1878. Michael Friedrich Ludwig Klump (Handsome Fritz) was sent to jail for 18 years. He died in prison in 1827. Sebastian Kellerman (Baste) was also sentenced to 18 years. Christian Maucher (the Bußmannshausen Tailor) went down for four years. Ottilia Hunsinger (Vetters Ottl) was sentenced to six months imprisonment, whereas the other women of the gang received jail sentences between two and three and a half years. Franz Merkle (Weaver Franz) was not apprehended until 1823 and in 1825 he was sentenced to three and a half years imprisonment, which he was to spend in a workhouse. After his release, he seemed to have been unable to stay out of trouble since court records from Constance show that the court there asked for the assistance of the Württemberg court in Ulm on the matter of an investigation against Merkle who stood accused of criminal acts at the court in Constance.

== Legacy ==
Xaver Hohenleiter and his gang were the last representatives of banditry in Upper Swabia, so widespread and common during the Ancient Regime.

=== Literature ===
In his volume "Poems" (Gedichte), published in 1828, Swabian poet Gustav Schwab wrote a poem titled Psalm 104,4 (Angeklopft das Wetter unter Sturm, zu Biberach am Sünderturm) about the death of Hohenleiter.

A children's book titled Der schwarze Veri. Eine wahre Räubergeschichte aus napoleonischer Zeit ("The Black Xaver. A True Robber's Story from Napoleonic Times") was published in 1995 by Elke Knittel. The book retells the legends surrounding the robber, utilising the original files of the investigation as well as surviving court records.

=== Music ===
Ravensburg band Gsälzbär released a song in which the life of the Schwarze Vere is portrayed.

Grachmusikoff, a band from Bad Schussenried, dedicated a song to Schwaaz Vere on their 1994 CD Quasi lebt.

=== Other ===
Soon after his death legends about Schwaaz Veri began to evolve. These legends were akin to other legends about notorious criminals by using similar topoi, and as late as the beginning of the twentieth century the figure of Schwaaz Vere was still used as a bogeyman figure in Upper Swabian folklore.

In 1970 a carnival association in Ravensburg decided to name itself after the famous robber: Ravensburger Schwarze Veri Zunft. Today it is one of the largest of its kind in Upper Swabia.

== See also ==
- Upper Swabia
