= Möhringen =

Möhringen may refer to several places in south-western Germany:

- Möhringen (Stuttgart), part of Stuttgart
- Möhringen an der Donau, a village on the River Danube in the district of Tuttlingen
- Möhringen (Unlingen), part of Unlingen
