= Moosburg (disambiguation) =

Moosburg may refer to:

- Moosburg an der Isar, a town in Bavaria, Germany
- Moosburg, Baden-Württemberg, a municipality in Baden-Württemberg, Germany
- Moosburg, Austria, a market town in Carinthia, Austria
- Przedecz, a town in Greater Poland Voivodeship, Poland
- Zalavár, a municipality in Zala County, Hungary

People:

- Berthold of Moosburg (died after 1361), Dominican theologian

Castles:

- Mosburg (Biebrich) in Wiesbaden, Hesse, Germany
