= Metallwerk Oscar Weil =

- Website: www.oscarweil.de/

Metallwerk Oscar Weil is a company with a long tradition from Lahr/Black Forest, known among other things for the brand name abrazo.

== History ==
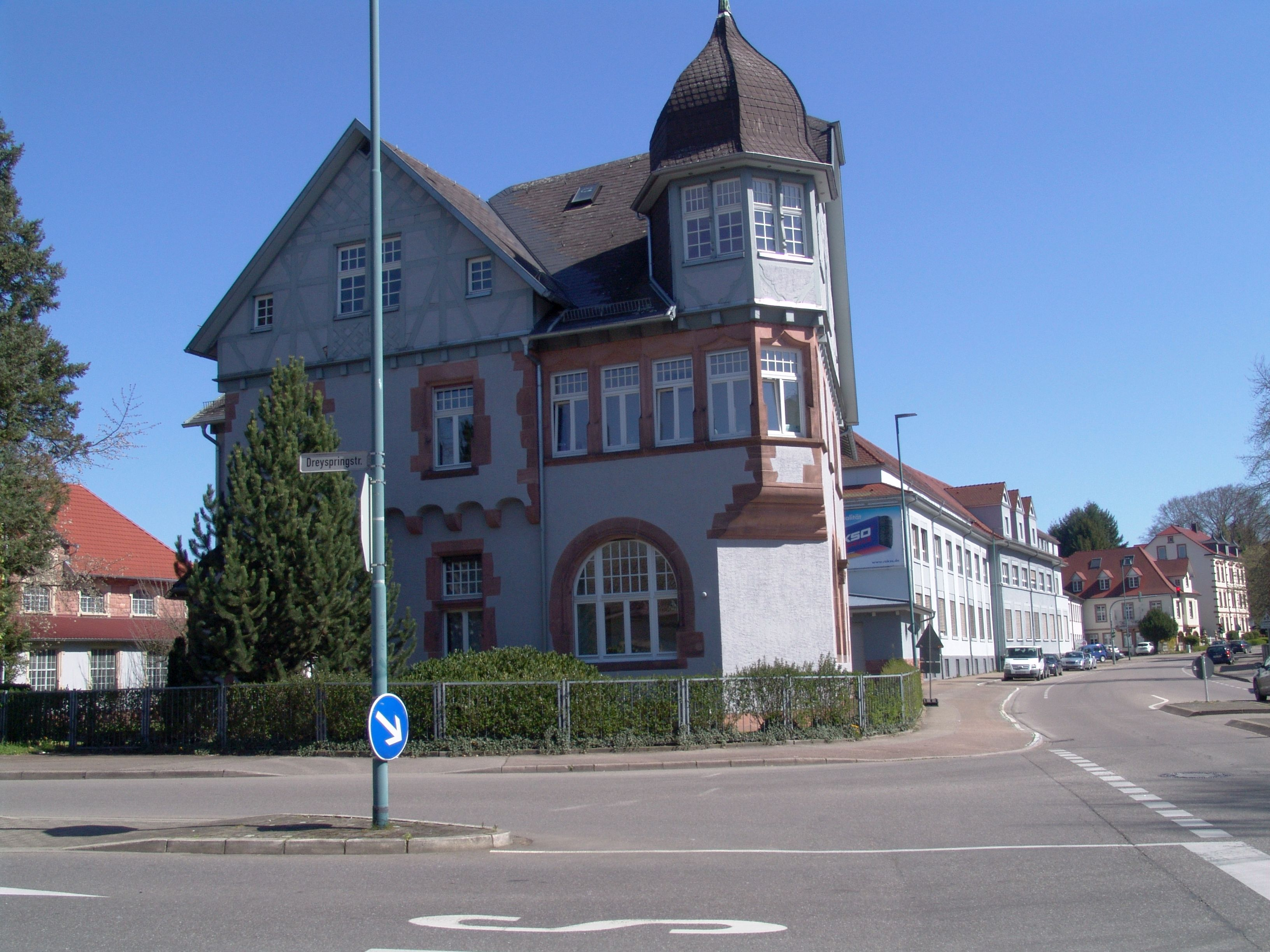
Oscar Weil GmbH

The beginnings of the business go back to a hardware and leather goods store founded by two brothers of the Jewish Weil family in Allmannsweier. In 1884, a branch office was established in Lahr. After one of the brothers, Oscar Weil (1860-1926), had recognized the importance of steel shavings, especially for the maintenance of wooden floors, on his travels through Europe, he started the production of this product in 1899 with five workers. By 1901, there were already 12 employees, and by 1914, 30. In 1910, the company also moved into a new factory building in Tramplerstraße. In 1926, the company was taken over by Hugo Weil (1893-1945), Oscar Weil's son, who also produced steel wool from 1931 and built an extension in 1937.

In 1938, the "Aryanization" of the company, which had 150 employees at the time, was initiated and it changed hands at the end of 1939. The new owner was the Baden NSDAP Gauwirtschaftsberater Clemens Kentrup, director at the Tscheulin aluminum plant in Teningen. Kentrup was married to the daughter of Emil Tscheulin. As Nazi economic advisor for Baden, Kentrup was instrumental in promoting the Aryanization of small and medium-sized businesses, which then had to be confirmed by the president of the Chamber of Industry and Commerce. At that time, Kentrup's father-in-law Emil Tscheulin was the president of the responsible Chamber of Industry and Commerce, who presumably also financed Kentrup's takeover of the Oscar Weil metal works.

Hugo Weil emigrated to England and died there in January 1945. In the same year, Iselore Prinz (* 1919-2014), Hugo Weil's daughter, took over the management of the company, which had returned to family ownership, initially with 25 employees, and managed it until 1970. The company continued to innovate, filing patents.

In 1955, the company already had 100 employees. The metal plant is still family-owned and is one of the leading companies in the field of steel chips, steel wool and similar products.

== Literature ==
- Hildegard Kattermann: Geschichte und Schicksale der Lahrer Juden. Eine Dokumentation. Hg. Stadt Lahr, 1976.
- Roland Peter: Die Kammern unterm Hakenkreuz. In: Bernd Boll und Ursula Huggle (Hrsg.): Die Industrie- und Handelskammer Südlicher Oberrhein. Hrsg. i. A. IHK Oberrhein - IHK Südlicher Oberrhein, Freiburg 1998, S. 145–174, ISBN 3-00-002797-1.
