= Bussen =

Mountain in Germany

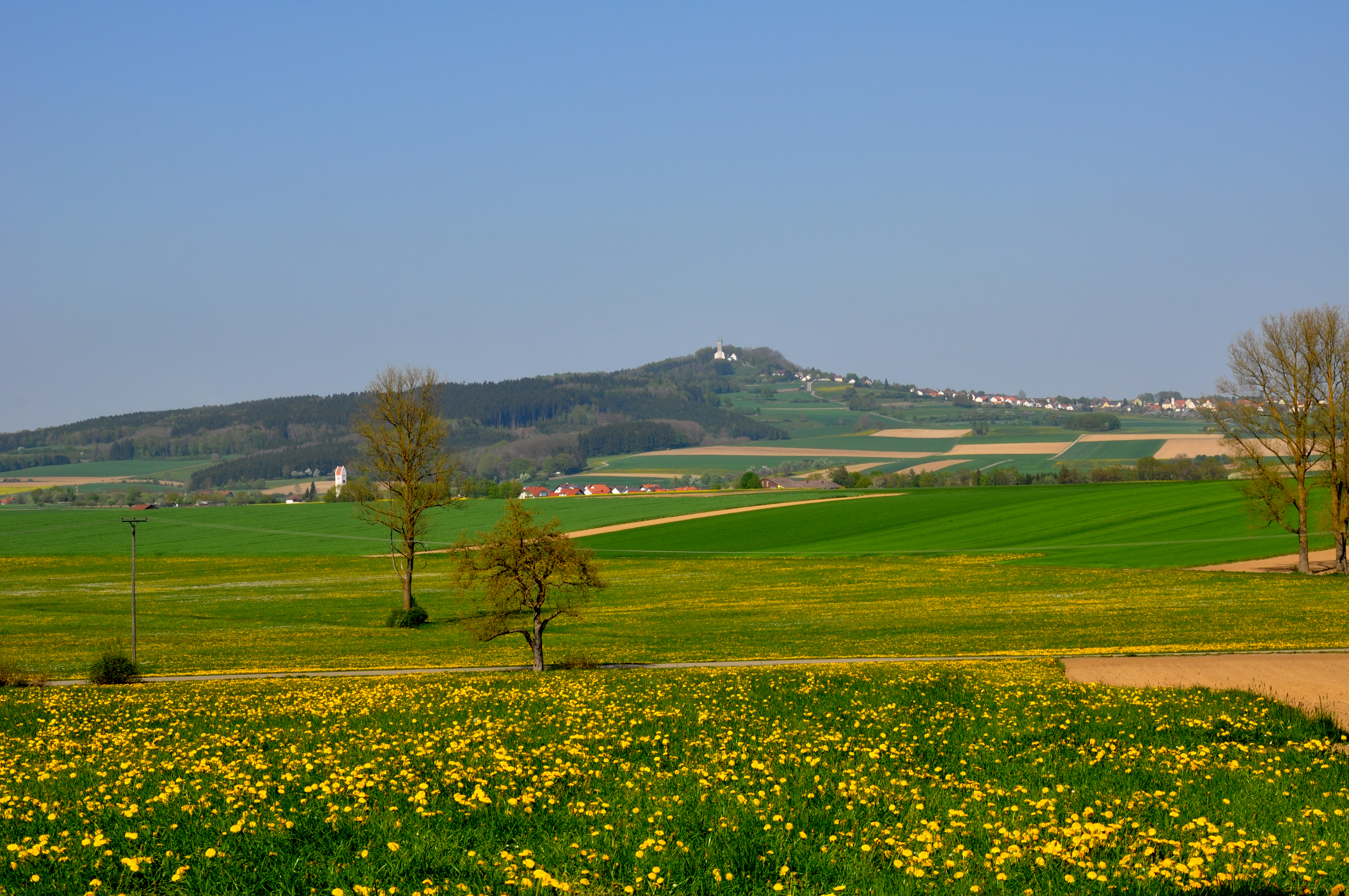
- View from Heudorf

Highest point
- Elevation: 767 m (2,516 ft)
- Coordinates: 48°9′43″N 9°33′19″E

Geography
- Location within Baden-Württemberg Location within Germany
- Location: Baden-Württemberg, Germany
- Parent range: Swabian Jura

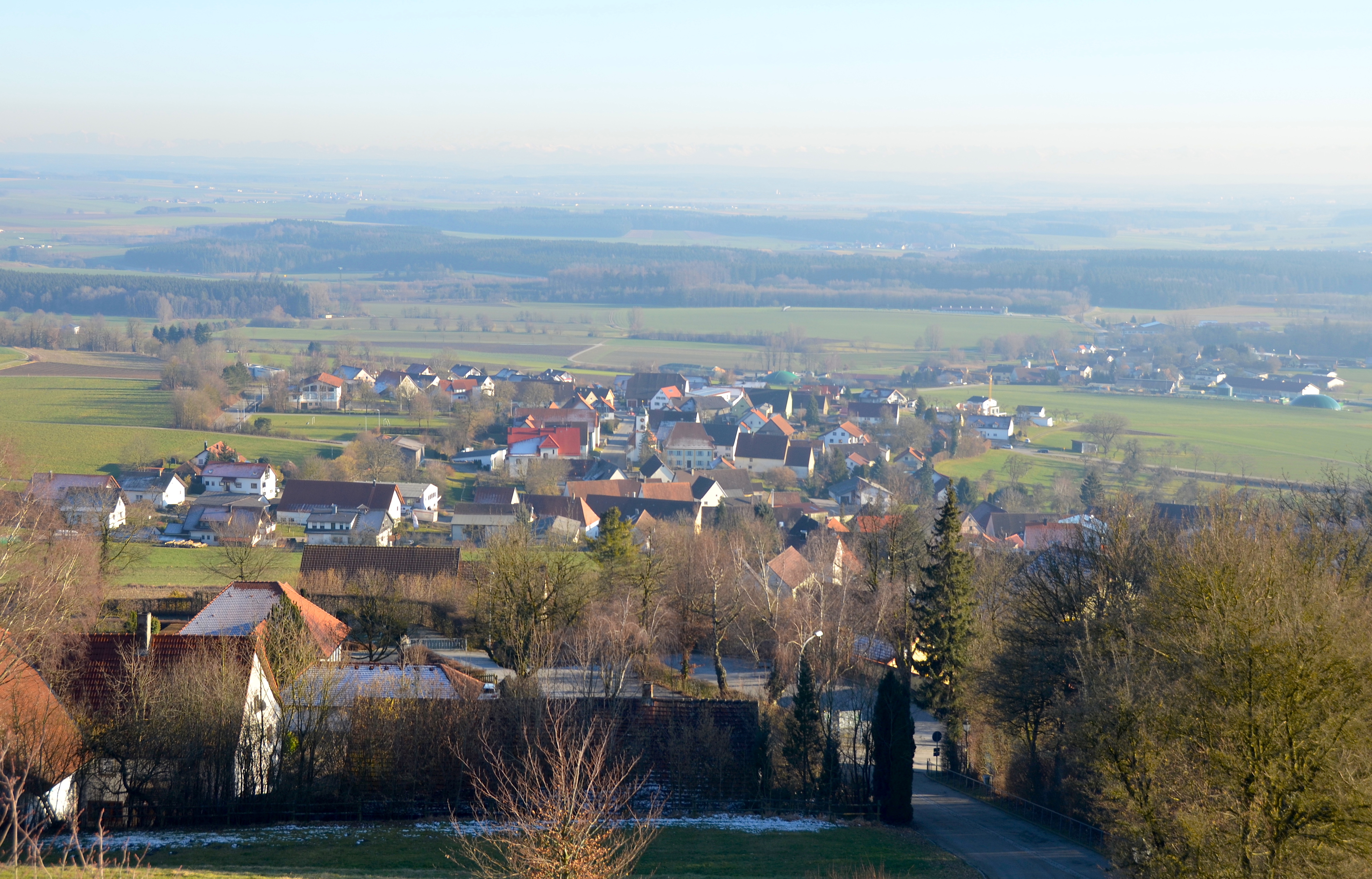
Offingen seen from the Bussen

The Bussen is a mountain in southern Germany, in the region of Upper Swabia, with an elevation of 767 metres (approximately 2516 ft). It is also known as the Holy Mountain of Upper Swabia. It is situated on the border between the Swabian Alb and Upper Swabia proper. Being one of the most visited places of pilgrimage in Upper Swabia, it also has views as far as the Alps more than 100 kilometres (62 mi) to the south.

== Geography ==
The Bussen is in the west of the district of Biberach in the state of Baden-Württemberg between Lake Federsee and the town of Riedlingen. It is one of the highest mountains in Upper Swabia. In clear weather conditions, it is possible to see the Münster in Ulm as well as the chain of mountains stretching from Füssen in southern Bavaria to the Säntis in Switzerland. The village of Offingen, part of the municipality of Uttenweiler, is situated on the southern slopes of the Bussen.

== Geology ==
When the mountain range of the Alps was formed during the tertiary period, the Bussen was part of the folding up process. The mountain is protected from erosion by a layer of limestone, which is up to 8 metres (26 ft) thick. The mountain glaciers of the ice ages were not able to surmount it as a result of which the mountain was not levelled and still exists today.

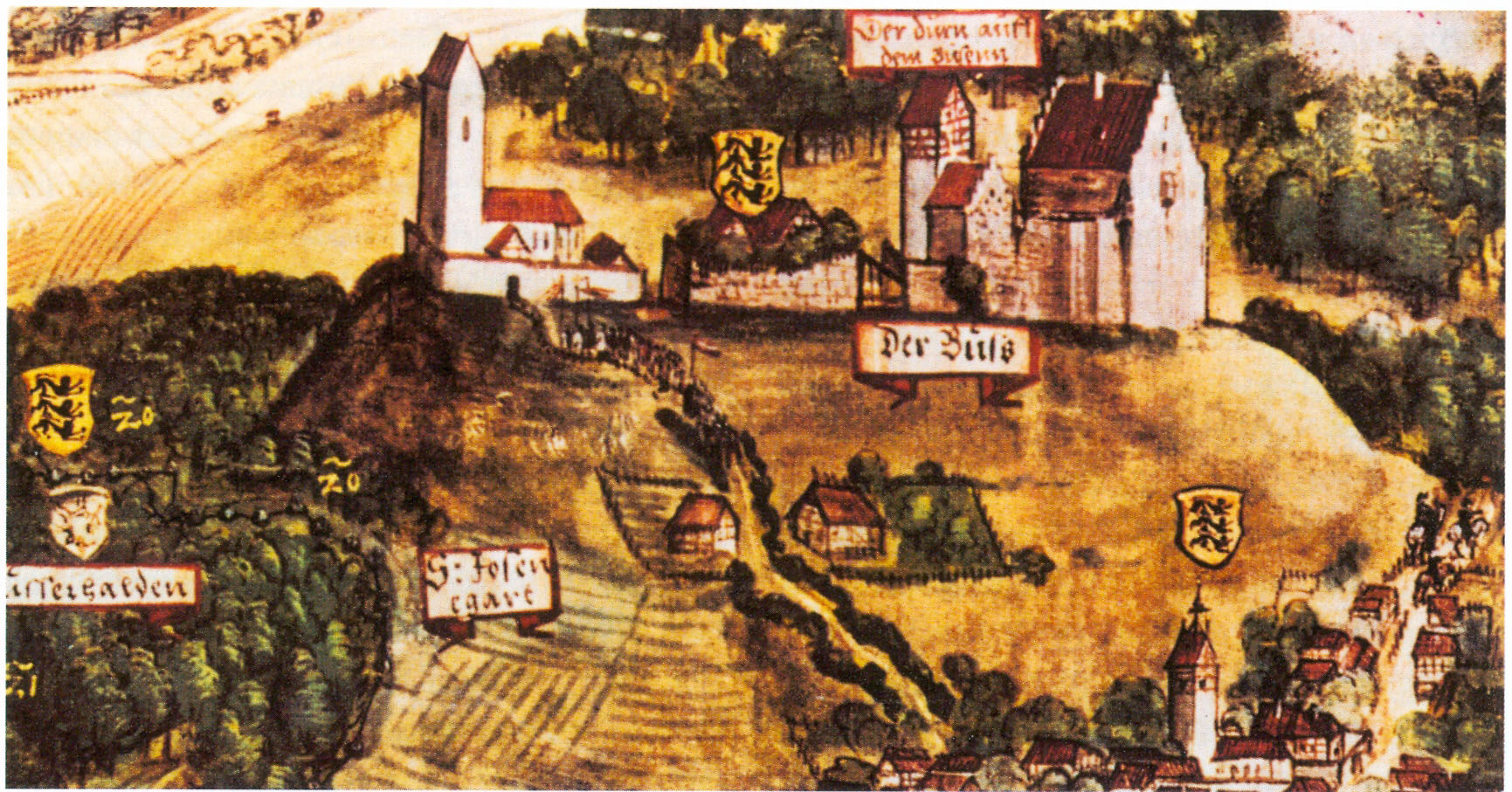
Bussen, ca. 1589

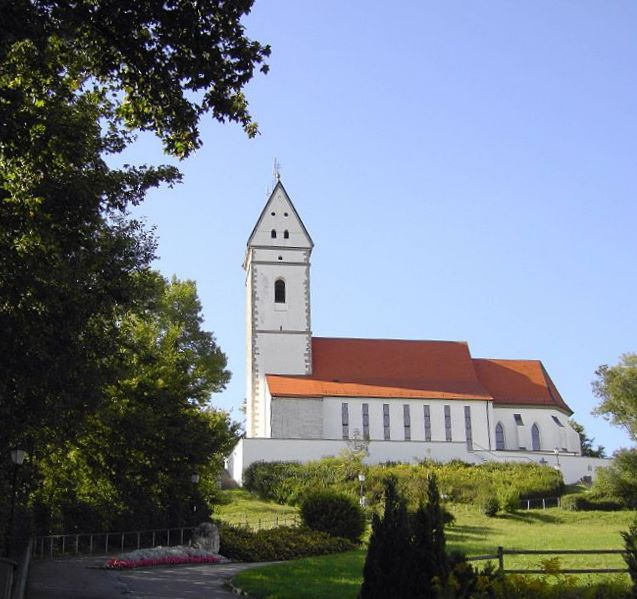
Pilgrimage church St John the Baptist

== History ==
Due to its exposed location, the Bussen has been visited and revered since prehistoric times. The Celts used the mountain for sacrifices during their fertility rites. A church on top of the mountain was first mentioned in a charter dating from the reign of Charlemagne in 805, when the church was transferred to the monastery of St. Gallen. From this time on, the Bussen has been known as a place of pilgrimage.

During the 13th century, an imperial castle owned by the Hohenstaufen was mentioned. After the fall of the Hohenstaufen dynasty, the castle first passed into the possession of the Counts of Veringen, subsequently falling to the house of Habsburg. In 1387, the mountain was mortgaged to the Truchsess of Waldburg. The military and political function of the Bussen came to an end in 1633, when the castle was destroyed by Swedish troops during the Thirty Years' War.

In 1786, the Waldburg dynasty sold the Lordship Bussen to Karl Anselm, 4th Prince of Thurn and Taxis. Following the Reichsdeputationshauptschluss, the mediatisation and secularisation of numerous secular and ecclesiastical principalities within the former Holy Roman Empire, the Lordship was annexed by the newly formed Kingdom of Württemberg in 1806.

== Pilgrimage church St John the Baptist ==
A pilgrimage church was first mentioned in 805. The existing church originally was built in 1516 and is dedicated to St John the Baptist. The choir and the spire date from this period. The nave, however, was pulled down and rebuilt in a larger dimension during restoration and renovation works carried out between 1960 and 1963.

Pilgrimages to the church in order to venerate the Virgin Mary, represented by a 16th-century Pietà, have been recorded since 1521. Beginning in the 1950s, the Bussen became the destination of a large pilgrimage procession during Pentecost.

== See also ==
- Baden-Württemberg
- Upper Swabia
- Upper Swabian Baroque Route
