= Adelindis von Buchau =

Countess Adelinde of Spoleto

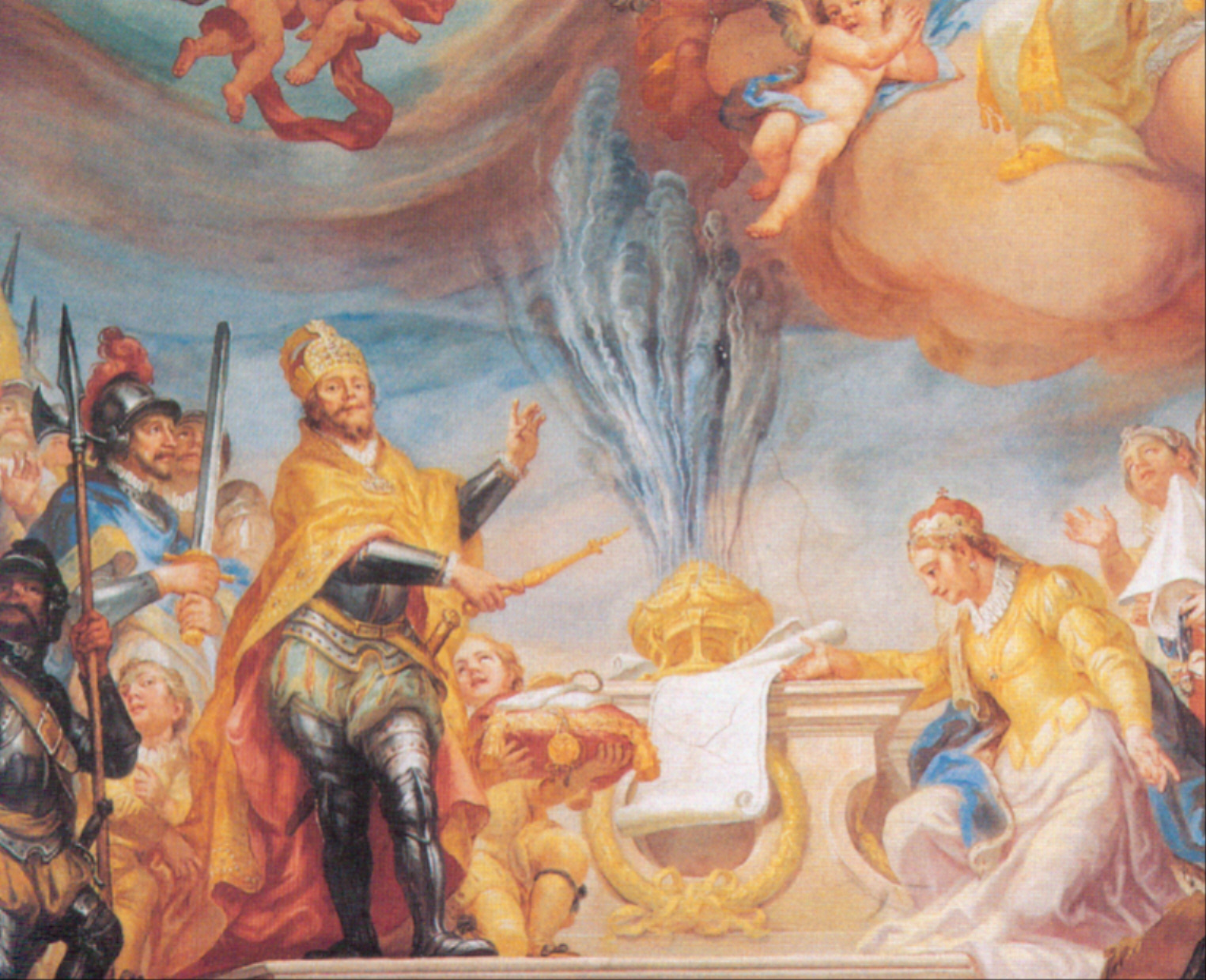
Adelindis kneels at right at the founding of the Abbey, 18th-century

Adelindis von Buchau (c. 729 – after 787), also known as Adelinde (sometimes spelled "Haddellind"), was the founder of the Buchau Ladies' Convent, in today's Bad Buchau near the Federsee lake in Swabia, Francia. She is not to be confused with Adelindis, the 2nd abbess of the monastery (died c. 914).

== Life ==
Adelindis was born c. 729, the daughter of Duke Hildeprand of Spoleto, a member of the Lombard nobility, later under the protection of Charlemagne. Her mother Regarde was the daughter of Gotfrid and came from Bavaria. She married the Frankish Count Warin II around 750. In 770 she and her husband founded the Buchau Abbey.

Nothing further is known about the grave of the founder. She was probably in Bad Buchau herself once in her life, but this has not been proven by documents to this day. Even the day of death on August 28 of an unknown year cannot be verified.

== Regional culture ==
In her memory, the Adelindis Festival, a homeland and children's festival, is celebrated in Bad Buchau every two years on August 28.

The Bad Buchau thermal baths Adelindis-Therme were named after her. The spring from which the water containing hydrogen sulfide is pumped up from a depth of 800 meters and feeds the Adelindis thermal baths at 47 degrees is called the Adelindis Spring. The mineral water is bottled and sold under the name Adelindis-Quelle. Adelindis II is a second thermal spring developed in December 2004 next to the Adelindis Spring in Bad Buchau.

== Adelindis II Spring ==
In Bad Buchau, there is special thermal water used for healing. The original well required repairs so, to ensure a sufficient supply, a second well was drilled. The new well, deep underground, provides warm water for various important locations, such as clinics and the city.

To protect the nature reserve, the new well was located across the street. However, a pipeline still needed to be installed through the reserve to connect the wells.

Although the water is valuable, selling it as a drink was not originally planned due to cost. It was only going to be used for healing in the spa and for heating buildings in Bad Buchau. Today, the mineral water is bottled and sold under the name Adelindis-Quelle.

== Sources ==
- Arno Borst (1998), "Adelinde, Nonne in Buchau", Mönche am Bodensee, Berlin: Ullstein Verlag, pp. 86–109, ISBN 3-548-26535-9
- Bernhard Theil (1994), Max-Planck-Institut für Geschichte (ed.), Das freiweltliche Damenstift Buchau am Federsee, Berlin; New York: Walter de Gruyter, p. 422, ISBN 3-11-014214-7
- Landesbeschreibungen des Staatsarchives Sigmaringen (1987), Landesarchivdirektion Baden-Württemberg in Verbindung mit dem Landkreis Biberach (ed.), Der Landkreis Biberach Band I, Sigmaringen: Jan Thorbecke Verlag Sigmaringen, pp. 502 f, ISBN 3-7995-6185-4
