= Dürnau =

Dürnau may refer to two towns in Baden-Württemberg, Germany:

- Dürnau, Biberach, in the district of Biberach
- Dürnau, Göppingen, in the district of Göppingen
