= Ingoldingen =

- Municipality
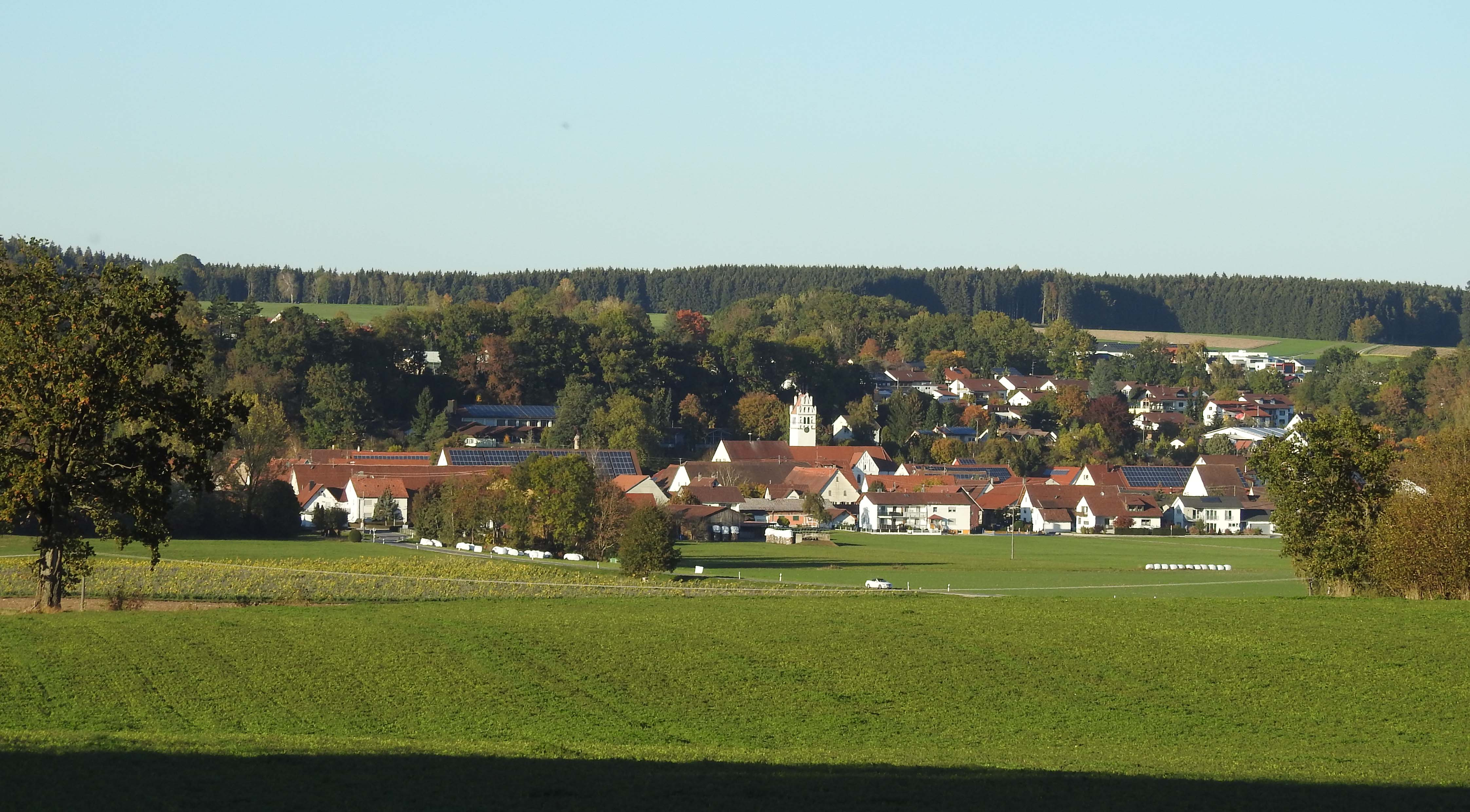

- Coat of arms

- Location of Ingoldingen within Biberach district
- Interactive map of Ingoldingen
- Location within Germany Location within Baden-Württemberg
- Coordinates: 48°1′33″N 9°44′31″E
- Country: Germany
- State: Baden-Württemberg
- Admin. region: Tübingen
- District: Biberach

Government
  - Mayor (2019–27): Jürgen Schnell

Area
  - Total: 44.24 km^{2} (17.08 sq mi)
- Elevation: 551 m (1,808 ft)

Population (2025-12-31)
  - Total: 3,199
  - Density: 72.31/km^{2} (187.3/sq mi)
- Time zone: UTC+01:00 (CET)
  - Summer (DST): UTC+02:00 (CEST)
- Postal codes: 88456
- Dialling codes: 07355
- Vehicle registration: BC
- Website: www.ingoldingen.de

Ingoldingen (German pronunciation: [ˈɪngɔldɪŋən]) is a town in the district of Biberach in Baden-Württemberg in Germany. It is located about 9 km southwest of Biberach an der Riß.
