= Unlingen =

- Municipality
- Coat of arms

- Location of Unlingen within Biberach district
- Interactive map of Unlingen
- Location within Germany Location within Baden-Württemberg
- Coordinates: 48°10′3″N 9°31′16″E
- Country: Germany
- State: Baden-Württemberg
- Admin. region: Tübingen
- District: Biberach

Government
  - Mayor (2021–29): Gerhard Hinz

Area
  - Total: 26.87 km^{2} (10.37 sq mi)
- Elevation: 535 m (1,755 ft)

Population (2025-12-31)
  - Total: 2,432
  - Density: 90.51/km^{2} (234.4/sq mi)
- Time zone: UTC+01:00 (CET)
  - Summer (DST): UTC+02:00 (CEST)
- Postal codes: 88527
- Dialling codes: 07371
- Vehicle registration: BC
- Website: www.unlingen.de

Unlingen (German pronunciation: [ˈʊnlɪŋən]) is a municipality in the district of Biberach in Baden-Württemberg in Germany.

== Geography ==
Unlingen lies in southwestern Germany, between the Upper Swabian mountain known as the Bussen and the river Danube.

Unlingen contains the districts of Dietelhofen, Göffingen, Möhringen and Uigendorf.

== Political history ==
The first recorded mention of Unlingen occurred in 1163. In 1291 Unlingen fell to the House of Habsburg, and eventually became a part of Further Austria. At the end of the 14th century, the Steward of Waldburg held large portions of the town. In 1525, 2,000 farmers gathered in Unlingen as it became one of the starting points of the German Peasants' War. During the Thirty Years' War, Unlingen was destroyed by both Imperial and Swedish troops. In 1635, plague killed a large part of the population.

In 1806, during the Napoleonic Wars, Unlingen became a part of the Kingdom of Württemberg and was assigned to the jurisdiction of Riedlingen. With the district reform of 1938, the town became part of the county of Saulgau, then in 1973 was added to the district of Biberach.

== Religious history ==
By 1269 a church stood in Unlingen. In 1414 the Franciscan monastery Maria Heimsuchung was founded.

== Notable residents ==
German striker Mario Gomez grew up in Unlingen.
