= Erlenmoos =

- Municipality
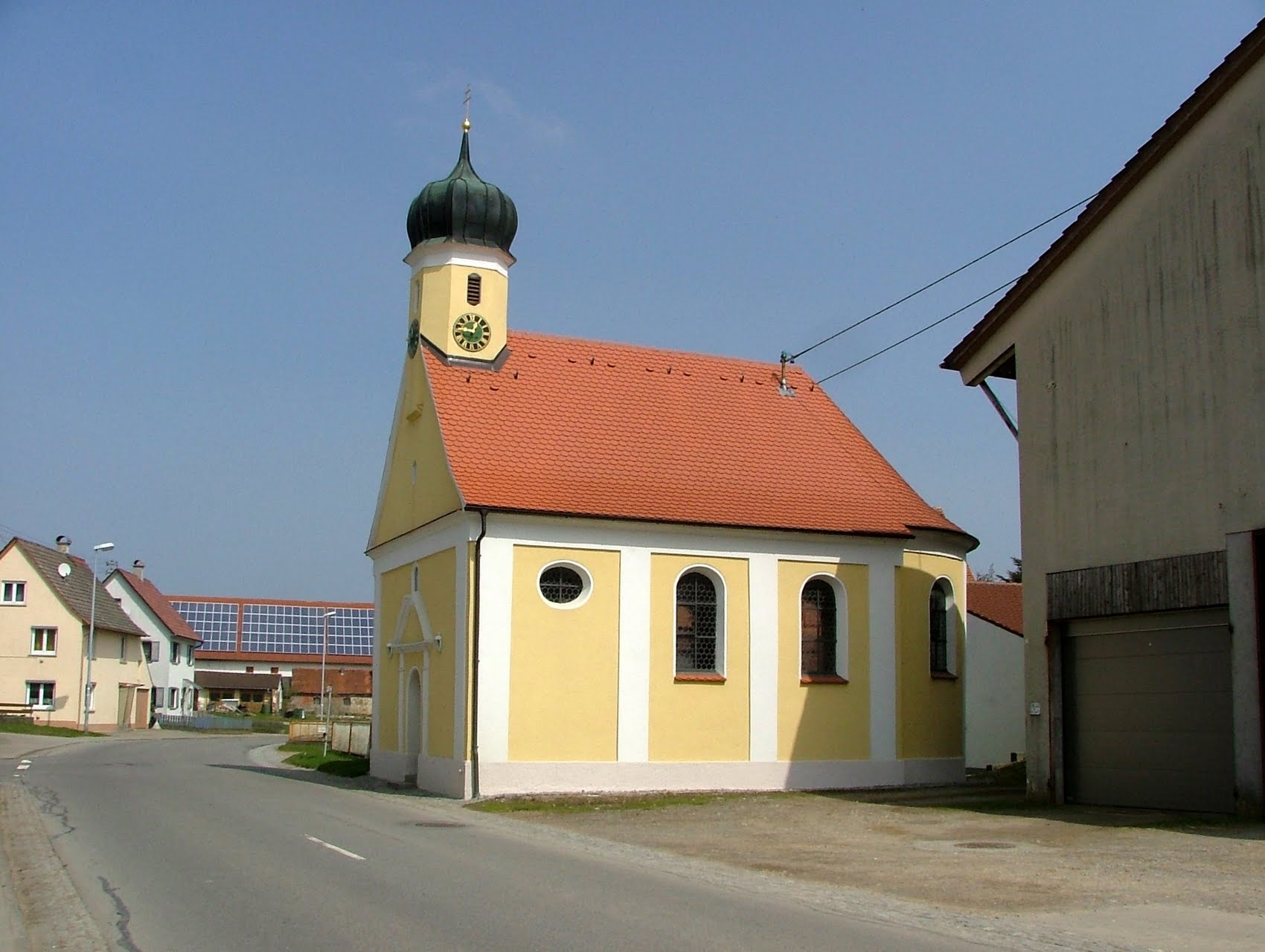
- Chapel of the Virgin Mary

- Coat of arms

- Location of Erlenmoos within Biberach district
- Interactive map of Erlenmoos
- Location within Germany Location within Baden-Württemberg
- Coordinates: 48°3′47″N 9°58′30″E
- Country: Germany
- State: Baden-Württemberg
- Admin. region: Tübingen
- District: Biberach

Government
  - Mayor (2022–30): Marcus Schmid

Area
  - Total: 24.26 km^{2} (9.37 sq mi)
- Elevation: 639 m (2,096 ft)

Population (2025-12-31)
  - Total: 1,821
  - Density: 75.06/km^{2} (194.4/sq mi)
- Time zone: UTC+01:00 (CET)
  - Summer (DST): UTC+02:00 (CEST)
- Postal codes: 88416
- Dialling codes: 07352
- Vehicle registration: BC

Erlenmoos (German pronunciation: [ˈɛʁlənmoːs]) is a municipality in the district Biberach, Baden-Württemberg, Germany. It is near Ochsenhausen. Its mayor is Mr. Marcus Schmid. Erlenmoos has about 1000 inhabitants. The villages of Edenbachen, Eichbühl and Oberstetten belong to Erlenmoos. Erlenmoos used to belong to Ochsenhausen Abbey.

== Notable people ==
- Gerhard Hess (1731–1802), Benediktiner monk and Historian, born in Oberstetten
