= Betzenweiler =

- Municipality
- Coat of arms

- Location of Betzenweiler within Biberach district
- Interactive map of Betzenweiler
- Location within Germany Location within Baden-Württemberg
- Coordinates: 48°7′2″N 9°34′28″E
- Country: Germany
- State: Baden-Württemberg
- Admin. region: Tübingen
- District: Biberach

Government
  - Mayor (2018–26): Tobias Wäscher

Area
  - Total: 9.68 km^{2} (3.74 sq mi)
- Elevation: 579 m (1,900 ft)

Population (2025-12-31)
  - Total: 736
  - Density: 76.0/km^{2} (197/sq mi)
- Time zone: UTC+01:00 (CET)
  - Summer (DST): UTC+02:00 (CEST)
- Postal codes: 88422
- Dialling codes: 07374
- Vehicle registration: BC
- Website: www.betzenweiler.de

Betzenweiler (German pronunciation: [ˈbɛtsn̩vaɪlɐ]) is a municipality in the Biberach district of Baden-Württemberg, in southwestern Germany.

The 9.7-square-kilometre (3.7 sq mi) area is between the basin of Federsee and the Bussen, the largest mountain in central Swabia.

The official language is German, but day-to-day conversations by almost all of its inhabitants are in Swabian dialect.

Relative to its size of ca. 713 Betzenweiler has a big industry and more in-commuters than out-commuters.

There are about 15 bigger companies, some with more than 200 employees, and a lot of small ones.
