= Federsee =

Lake in Baden-Württemberg, Germany

Lake Federsee
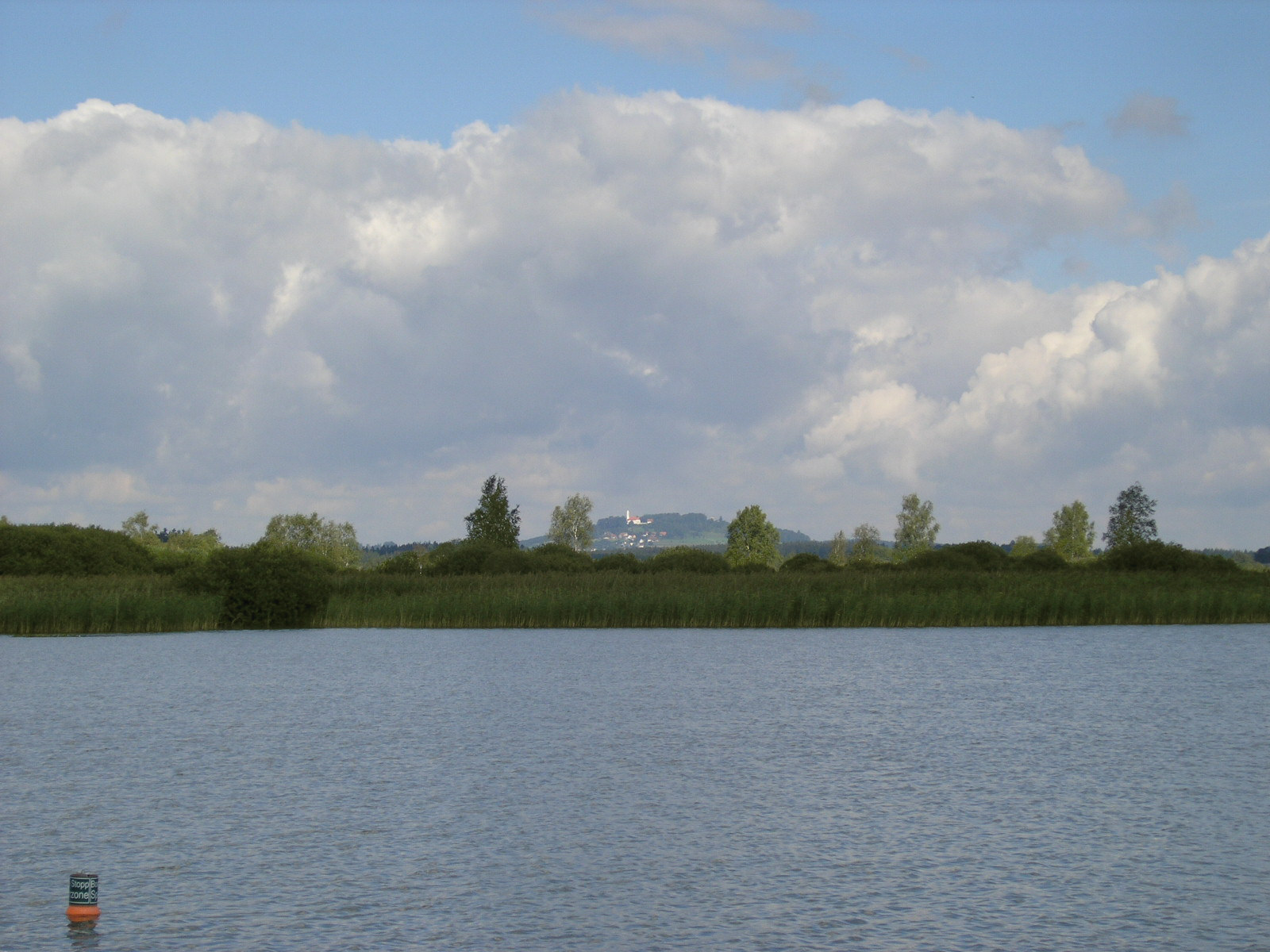

- Location within Germany
- Location: Upper Swabia
- Coordinates: 48°05′N 9°38′E
- Primary inflows: groundwater
- Basin countries: Germany
- Max. depth: 2 m (6 ft 7 in)
- Surface elevation: 592 m (1,942 ft)
- Settlements: Bad Buchau, Moosburg, Alleshausen, Seekirch, Tiefenbach, Oggelshausen

Federsee is a lake located just north of Bad Buchau in the region of Upper Swabia in Southern Germany. It is surrounded by moorland, partially overgrown with reeds. With a size of 33 km^{2} (8,155 acres), the area is one of the largest, groundwater fed, connected moorlands in Southern Germany. At its deepest point, Lake Federsee has a depth of 2 metres (6.5 feet). Federsee translates to 'feather lake' and its shape resembles that of a feather. However, the origin of its name is locally debated, with one camp defending the shape theory, and another championing the idea that the amount of feathers found on the lake's surface gave rise to its name. The most probable explanation for the origin of the name is, however, the Celtic word "pheder" which means marsh. Therefore, the name refers to the origin of the lake itself and the surrounding landscape. The lake is encircled by the town of Bad Buchau, and the villages of Moosburg, Alleshausen, Seekirch, Tiefenbach, and Oggelshausen.

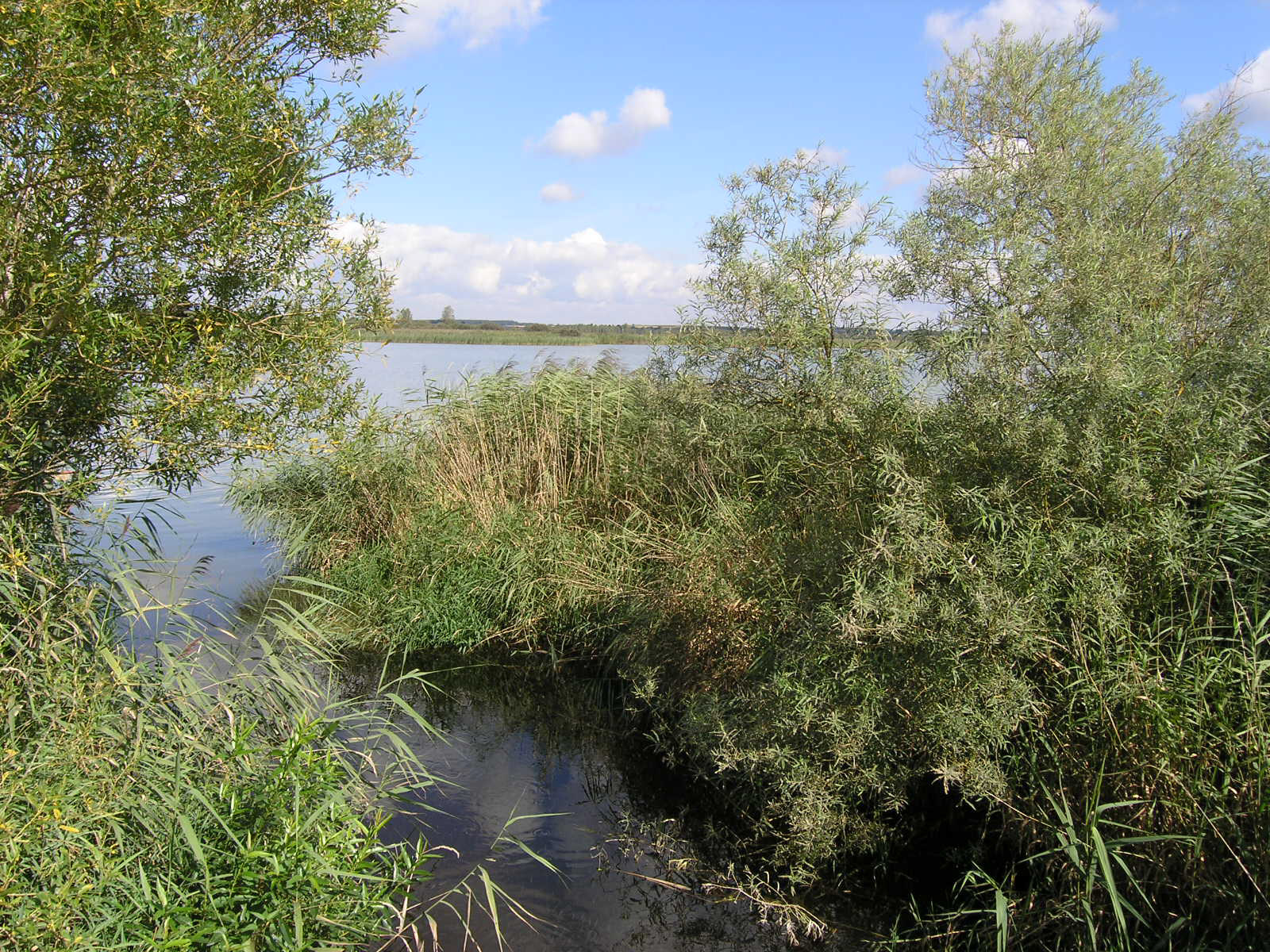
Reed beds at Lake Federsee

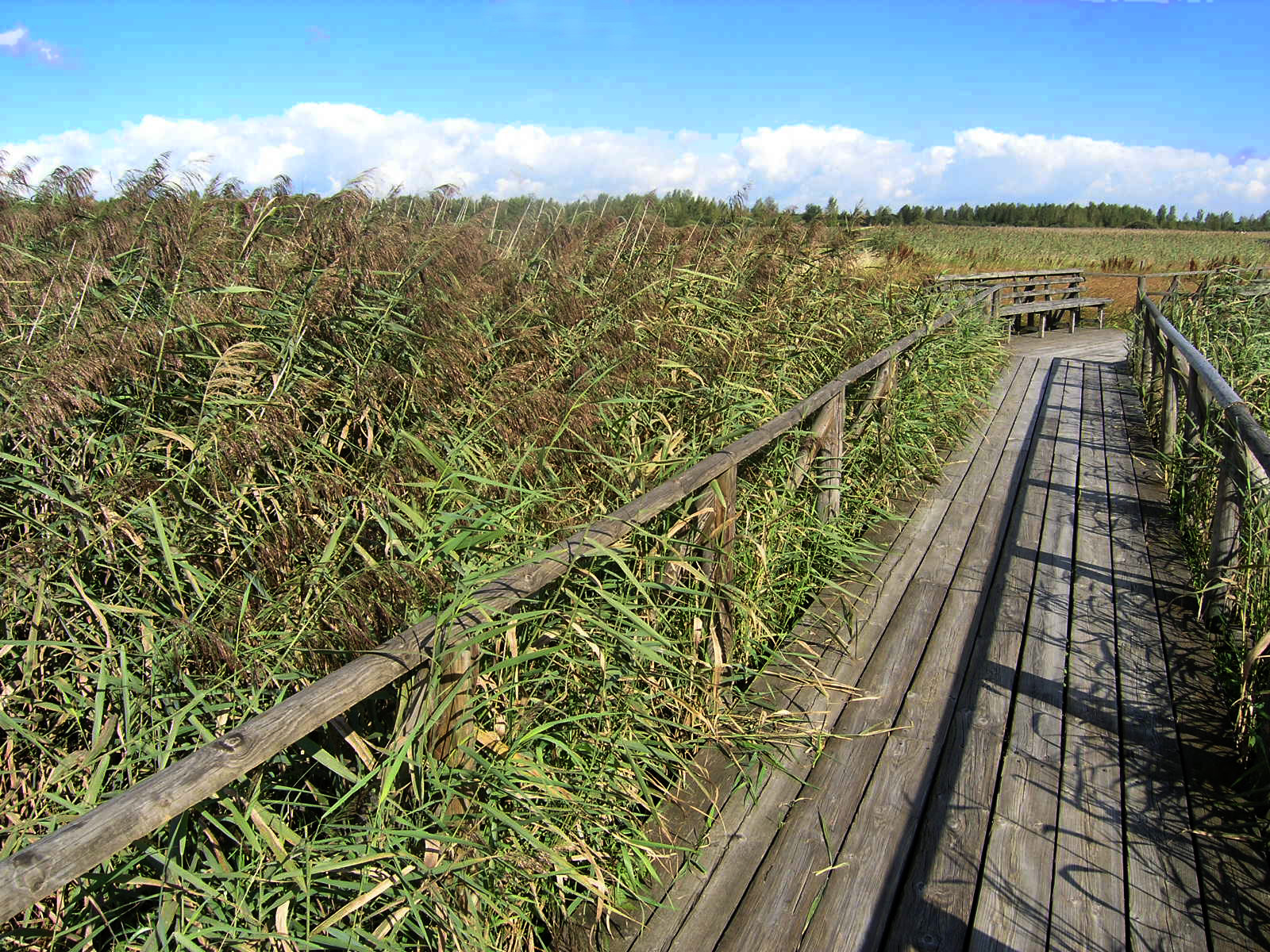
Lake Federsee boardwalk

The lake and its immediate surroundings are a designated Special Protection Area for the conservation of wild birds. Around 265 bird species live in the vicinity of the lake, 107 of which are breeding here. The lake is also populated by 200 breeding pairs of whinchats and 18 breeding pairs of marsh harriers. Both are endangered species.

The Lake Federsee area has been declared a Special Protection Area under the European Union Directive on the Conservation of Wild Birds and the Habitats Directive. Furthermore, the area is part of the European ecology network Natura 2000.

The basin of Lake Federsee is famous for its excavations of Stone Age and Bronze Age artifacts, which are prominently displayed at the Federsee Museum.

Since the lake is completely surrounded by belts of reed and bogs, it is impossible to access the lake directly. Therefore, a narrow wooden boardwalk approx 1.5 km (0.93 mi) in length was constructed. Starting near the parking area at the Federsee Museum, it leads through the reed belt until open water is reached. Here one finds an observation platform and boat rental facility. There are a variety of piers leading to different parts of the protected area, which otherwise would be inaccessible by foot.

The village of Tiefenbach is located closest to the water. When Lake Federsee's surface is frozen during the winter months it is possible to walk from Tiefenbach to Bad Buchau across the frozen lake.
