= Hochdorf, Biberach =

Hochdorf
- Municipality
- Coat of arms

- Location of Hochdorf within Biberach district
- Interactive map of Hochdorf
- Location within Germany Location within Baden-Württemberg
- Coordinates: 48°1′31″N 9°47′12″E
- Country: Germany
- State: Baden-Württemberg
- Admin. region: Tübingen
- District: Biberach

Government
  - Mayor (2020–28): Stefan Jäckle

Area
  - Total: 23.77 km^{2} (9.18 sq mi)
- Elevation: 574 m (1,883 ft)

Population (2025-12-31)
  - Total: 2,416
  - Density: 101.6/km^{2} (263.2/sq mi)
- Time zone: UTC+01:00 (CET)
  - Summer (DST): UTC+02:00 (CEST)
- Postal codes: 88454
- Dialling codes: 07355
- Vehicle registration: BC
- Website: www.gemeinde-hochdorf.de

Hochdorf (German pronunciation: [ˈhoːxdɔʁf]) is a municipality in the district of Biberach in Baden-Württemberg in Germany.
