= Gutenzell-Hürbel =

- Municipality
- Coat of arms

- Location of Gutenzell-Hürbel within Biberach district
- Interactive map of Gutenzell-Hürbel
- Location within Germany Location within Baden-Württemberg
- Coordinates: 48°6′48″N 9°59′51″E
- Country: Germany
- State: Baden-Württemberg
- Admin. region: Tübingen
- District: Biberach
- Subdivisions: 2

Government
  - Mayor (2023–31): Thomas Jerg

Area
  - Total: 37.86 km^{2} (14.62 sq mi)
- Elevation: 588 m (1,929 ft)

Population (2025-12-31)
  - Total: 1,808
  - Density: 47.75/km^{2} (123.7/sq mi)
- Time zone: UTC+01:00 (CET)
  - Summer (DST): UTC+02:00 (CEST)
- Postal codes: 88484
- Dialling codes: 07352
- Vehicle registration: BC
- Website: www.gutenzell-huerbel.de

Gutenzell-Hürbel (German pronunciation: [ˈɡuːtn̩tsɛl ˈhʏʁbl̩]) is a town in the district of Biberach in Baden-Württemberg in Germany.

Gutenzell developed out of Gutenzell Abbey, a Cistercian nunnery founded in 1237.
