= Wain (Württemberg) =

- Municipality
- Coat of arms

- Location of Wain within Biberach district
- Interactive map of Wain
- Location within Germany Location within Baden-Württemberg
- Coordinates: 48°11′17″N 10°1′13″E
- Country: Germany
- State: Baden-Württemberg
- District: Biberach

Government
  - Mayor (2022–30): Stephan Mantz

Area
  - Total: 20.14 km^{2} (7.78 sq mi)
- Elevation: 530 m (1,740 ft)

Population (2025-12-31)
  - Total: 1,664
  - Density: 82.62/km^{2} (214.0/sq mi)
- Time zone: UTC+01:00 (CET)
  - Summer (DST): UTC+02:00 (CEST)
- Postal codes: 88489
- Dialling codes: 07353
- Vehicle registration: BC
- Website: wain.de

Wain (German pronunciation: [ˈvaɪn]) is a village and municipality in the district of Biberach in Baden-Württemberg in Germany.
