= Burgrieden =

German municipality

- Municipality
- Coat of arms

- Location of Burgrieden within Biberach district
- Interactive map of Burgrieden
- Location within Germany Location within Baden-Württemberg
- Coordinates: 48°14′25″N 9°56′9″E
- Country: Germany
- State: Baden-Württemberg
- Admin. region: Tübingen
- District: Biberach

Government
  - Mayor (2022–30): Frank Högerle

Area
  - Total: 21.87 km^{2} (8.44 sq mi)
- Elevation: 541 m (1,775 ft)

Population (2025-12-31)
  - Total: 4,295
  - Density: 196.4/km^{2} (508.6/sq mi)
- Time zone: UTC+01:00 (CET)
  - Summer (DST): UTC+02:00 (CEST)
- Postal codes: 88483
- Dialling codes: 07392
- Vehicle registration: BC
- Website: www.burgrieden.de

Burgrieden (German pronunciation: [ˈbʊɐ̯kʁiːdn̩]) is a municipality in the district of Biberach in Baden-Württemberg, Germany. It is located in the Central European Time Zone, and its population according to the latest data is roughly 3,600 people.
