= Attenweiler =

- Municipality
- Coat of arms

- Location of Attenweiler within Biberach district
- Interactive map of Attenweiler
- Location within Germany Location within Baden-Württemberg
- Coordinates: 48°8′5″N 9°41′52″E
- Country: Germany
- State: Baden-Württemberg
- Admin. region: Tübingen
- District: Biberach

Government
  - Mayor (2020–28): Roland Grootherder

Area
  - Total: 27.2 km^{2} (10.5 sq mi)
- Elevation: 596 m (1,955 ft)

Population (2025-12-31)
  - Total: 1,961
  - Density: 72.1/km^{2} (187/sq mi)
- Time zone: UTC+01:00 (CET)
  - Summer (DST): UTC+02:00 (CEST)
- Postal codes: 88448
- Dialling codes: 07357
- Vehicle registration: BC
- Website: www.attenweiler.de

Attenweiler (German pronunciation: [ˈatn̩vaɪlɐ]) is a municipality in the district of Biberach in Baden-Württemberg in Germany.
