= Maselheim =

- Municipality
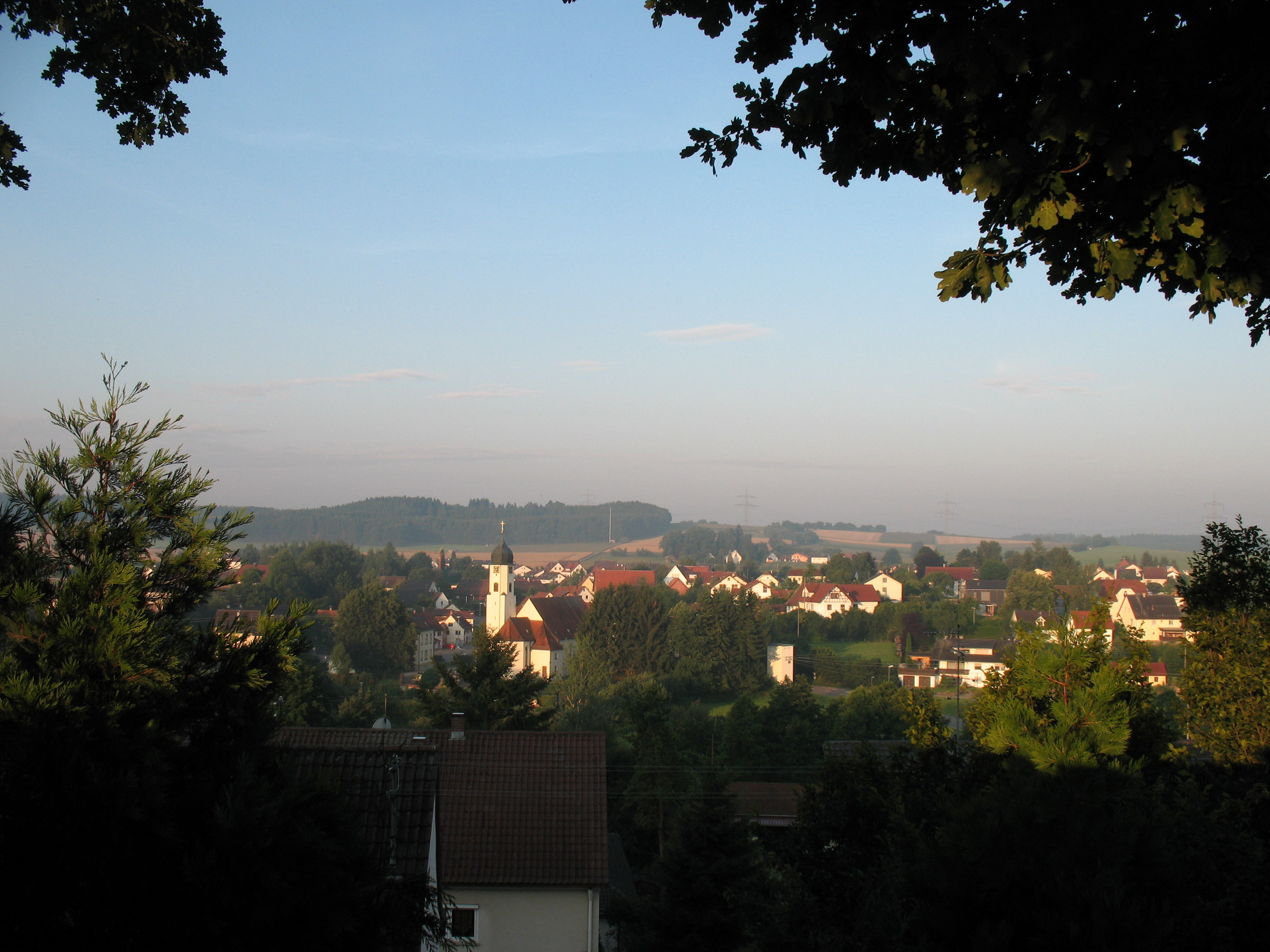

- Coat of arms

- Location of Maselheim within Biberach district
- Interactive map of Maselheim
- Location within Germany Location within Baden-Württemberg
- Coordinates: 48°8′3″N 9°53′2″E
- Country: Germany
- State: Baden-Württemberg
- Admin. region: Tübingen
- District: Biberach
- Subdivisions: 4

Government
  - Mayor (2023–31): Marc Hoffmann

Area
  - Total: 47.03 km^{2} (18.16 sq mi)
- Elevation: 544 m (1,785 ft)

Population (2025-12-31)
  - Total: 4,702
  - Density: 99.98/km^{2} (258.9/sq mi)
- Time zone: UTC+01:00 (CET)
  - Summer (DST): UTC+02:00 (CEST)
- Postal codes: 88437
- Dialling codes: 07351
- Vehicle registration: BC
- Website: www.maselheim.de

Maselheim (German pronunciation: [ˈmaːzl̩haɪm]) is a municipality in the district of Biberach in Baden-Württemberg in Germany.

== Mayors ==
- 1946–1954: Johann G. Härle
- 1954–1963: Josef Buck
- 1963–1991: Roland Schmid
- 1991–2023: Elmar Braun (born 1956), first Green mayor in the Federal Republic of Germany
- since 2023: Marc Hoffmann
