= Ummendorf, Baden-Württemberg =

Ummendorf
- Municipality
- Coat of arms

- Location of Ummendorf within Biberach district
- Interactive map of Ummendorf
- Location within Germany Location within Baden-Württemberg
- Coordinates: 48°3′52″N 9°49′38″E
- Country: Germany
- State: Baden-Württemberg
- Admin. region: Tübingen
- District: Biberach
- Subdivisions: 2

Government
  - Mayor (2022–30): Heiko Graf

Area
  - Total: 20.65 km^{2} (7.97 sq mi)
- Elevation: 545 m (1,788 ft)

Population (2025-12-31)
  - Total: 4,457
  - Density: 215.8/km^{2} (559.0/sq mi)
- Time zone: UTC+01:00 (CET)
  - Summer (DST): UTC+02:00 (CEST)
- Postal codes: 88444
- Dialling codes: 07351
- Vehicle registration: BC
- Website: www.ummendorf.de

Ummendorf (German pronunciation: [ˈʊməndɔʁf]) is a town in the district of Biberach in Baden-Württemberg in Germany.

== Attractions ==
Ummendorf is located on the main route of the Upper Swabian Baroque Route.

=== Buildings ===
- Catholic church Johanneskirche, 1805
- Castle Ummendorfer Schloss, 1560
- Castle Schloss Horn at Fischbach

== Climate ==
Climate data for Ummendorf (1991–2020 normals)
Month	Jan	Feb	Mar	Apr	May	Jun	Jul	Aug	Sep	Oct	Nov	Dec	Year
Mean daily maximum °C (°F)	3.5 (38.3)	4.5 (40.1)	8.9 (48.0)	14.4 (57.9)	18.1 (64.6)	21.4 (70.5)	24.5 (76.1)	24.2 (75.6)	19.7 (67.5)	13.7 (56.7)	7.8 (46.0)	4.7 (40.5)	13.9 (57.0)
Daily mean °C (°F)	1.0 (33.8)	1.5 (34.7)	4.7 (40.5)	9.1 (48.4)	13.0 (55.4)	16.2 (61.2)	18.4 (65.1)	18.6 (65.5)	14.6 (58.3)	9.9 (49.8)	5.4 (41.7)	2.6 (36.7)	9.7 (49.5)
Mean daily minimum °C (°F)	−1.3 (29.7)	−1.2 (29.8)	1.2 (34.2)	4.2 (39.6)	7.8 (46.0)	10.8 (51.4)	13.2 (55.8)	13.2 (55.8)	10.0 (50.0)	6.2 (43.2)	2.6 (36.7)	0.1 (32.2)	5.6 (42.1)
Average precipitation mm (inches)	39.2 (1.54)	25.5 (1.00)	34.3 (1.35)	28.7 (1.13)	58.4 (2.30)	63.9 (2.52)	67.3 (2.65)	59.8 (2.35)	43.0 (1.69)	42.3 (1.67)	39.8 (1.57)	40.0 (1.57)	557.2 (21.94)
Average precipitation days (≥ 1.0 mm)	17.0	13.5	13.9	11.3	13.4	13.6	14.5	13.8	11.6	14.6	15.8	18.5	175.3
Average relative humidity (%)	87.4	83.0	77.6	70.8	72.6	74.2	70.5	69.2	75.3	83.0	88.0	87.8	78.3
Mean monthly sunshine hours	51.6	76.6	134.3	198.9	223.3	237.2	227.3	215.3	159.9	117.6	55.9	47.5	1,825.6
Source: World Meteorological Organization
