= Dürmentingen =

- Municipality
- Coat of arms

- Location of Dürmentingen within Biberach district
- Interactive map of Dürmentingen
- Location within Germany Location within Baden-Württemberg
- Coordinates: 48°6′51″N 9°32′6″E
- Country: Germany
- State: Baden-Württemberg
- Admin. region: Tübingen
- District: Biberach

Government
  - Mayor (2024–32): Dietmar Holstein

Area
  - Total: 24.09 km^{2} (9.30 sq mi)
- Elevation: 575 m (1,886 ft)

Population (2025-12-31)
  - Total: 2,661
  - Density: 110.5/km^{2} (286.1/sq mi)
- Time zone: UTC+01:00 (CET)
  - Summer (DST): UTC+02:00 (CEST)
- Postal codes: 88525
- Dialling codes: 07371
- Vehicle registration: BC
- Website: www.duermentingen.de

Dürmentingen (German pronunciation: [dʏʁˈmɛntɪŋən]) is a town in the district of Biberach in Baden-Württemberg in Germany.
