= Allmannsweiler =

German municipality

- Municipality
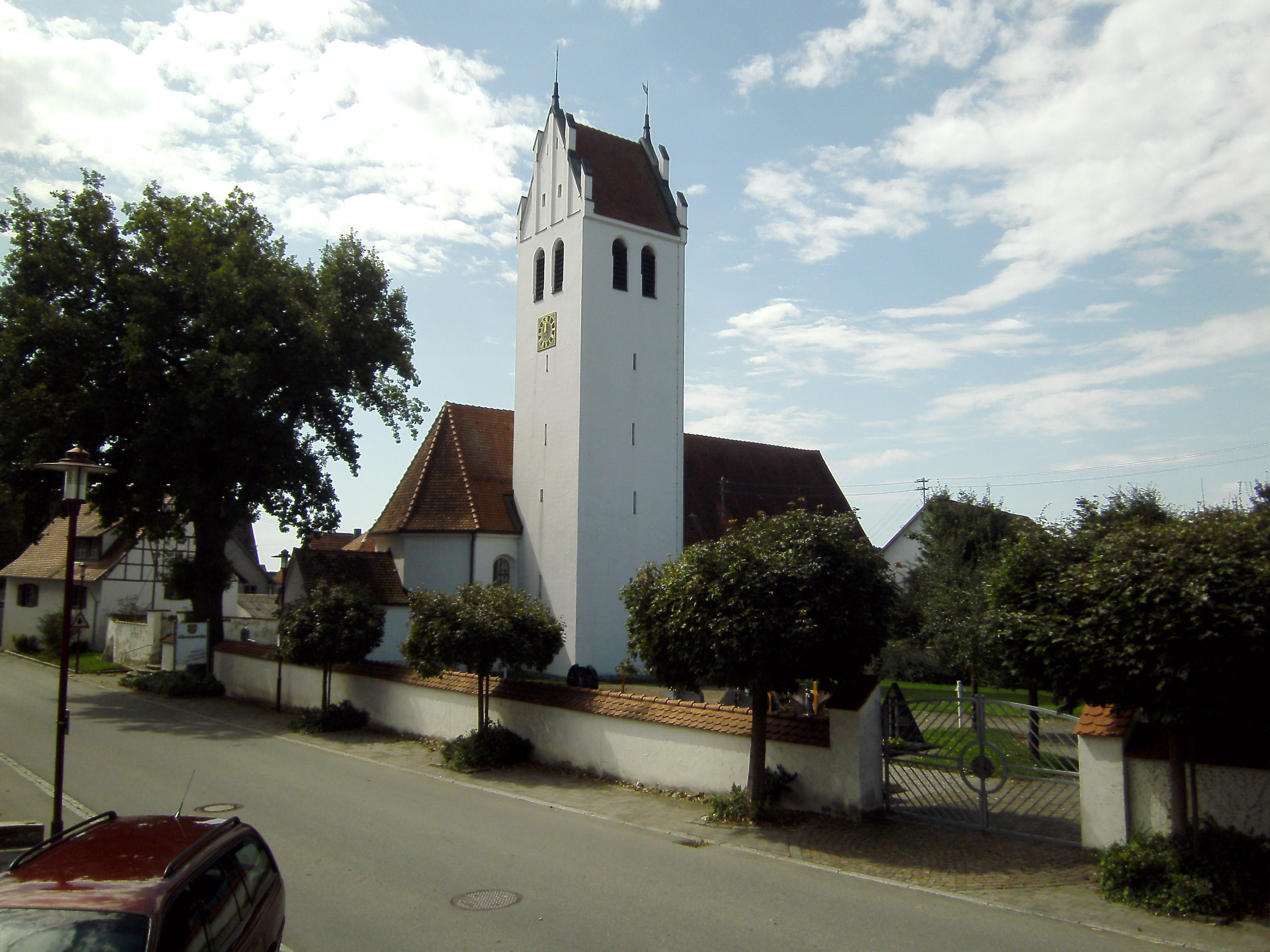
- Church of the Holy Cross, Allmannsweiler

- Coat of arms

- Location of Allmannsweiler within Biberach district
- Interactive map of Allmannsweiler
- Location within Germany Location within Baden-Württemberg
- Coordinates: 48°1′42″N 9°35′37″E
- Country: Germany
- State: Baden-Württemberg
- Admin. region: Tübingen
- District: Biberach

Government
  - Mayor: Stefan Koch

Area
  - Total: 4.10 km^{2} (1.58 sq mi)
- Elevation: 625 m (2,051 ft)

Population (2025-12-31)
  - Total: 324
  - Density: 79.0/km^{2} (205/sq mi)
- Time zone: UTC+01:00 (CET)
  - Summer (DST): UTC+02:00 (CEST)
- Postal codes: 88348
- Dialling codes: 07582
- Vehicle registration: BC
- Website: www.allmannsweiler-bc.de

Allmannsweiler (German pronunciation: [ˈalmansˌvaɪlɐ̯]) is a municipality in the district of Biberach in Baden-Württemberg in Germany.

== History ==
In 1803, Schussenried Abbey was secularized and its holdings mediatized to the County of Sternberg-Manderscheid. It was re-mediatized in 1806 to the Kingdom of Württemberg. As one of Schussenried Abbey's possessions, Allmannsweiler thus came under the sovereignty of Württemberg and was assigned to Oberamt Saulgau. In 1938, the Oberamt was reorganized into Landkreis Saulgau, which was dissolved by the 1973 Baden-Württemberg district reform. Allmannsweiler was subsequently assigned to a new district, that of Biberach an der Riss.

== Geography ==
The municipality (Gemeinde) of Allmannsweiler covers 410 hectares (1,000 acres) of the district of Biberach an der Riss, making it the second smallest municipality in that district. It is located at the southern edge of the district's area, along the border with the district of Sigmaringen. Allmannsweiler is physically located in the basin of the Federsee. Elevation above sea level in the municipal area ranges from a high of 646 meters (2,119 ft) Normalnull (NN) to a low of 589 meters (1,932 ft) NN.

== Culture ==
The architecture of Allmannsweiler is primarily made up of Baroque farmhouses and half-timber buildings. A notable edifice is the Gothic, 14th century Church of the Holy Cross, the local Roman Catholic parish church.

== Politics ==
Allmannsweiler has one borough (Ortsteil): Allmannsweiler.

=== Coat of arms ===
Allmannsweiler's coat of arms depicts a raised, golden cross upon a field of green. The cross is an image of the crucifix in the Church of the Holy Cross, and the green field references the agricultural character of the municipality's economy. This coat of arms was awarded along with a municipal flag by the Biberach district office on 23 March 1982.

== Transportation ==
Allmannsweiler is only connected to Germany's network of roadways by its local Kreisstraßen. Local bus lines provide for public transportation.
