= Steinhausen an der Rottum =

- Municipality
- Coat of arms

- Location of Steinhausen an der Rottum within Biberach district
- Interactive map of Steinhausen an der Rottum
- Location within Germany Location within Baden-Württemberg
- Coordinates: 48°1′27″N 9°57′21″E
- Country: Germany
- State: Baden-Württemberg
- Admin. region: Tübingen
- District: Biberach
- Subdivisions: 3

Government
  - Mayor (2019–27): Hans-Peter Reck

Area
  - Total: 29.88 km^{2} (11.54 sq mi)
- Elevation: 650 m (2,130 ft)

Population (2025-12-31)
  - Total: 2,216
  - Density: 74.16/km^{2} (192.1/sq mi)
- Time zone: UTC+01:00 (CET)
  - Summer (DST): UTC+02:00 (CEST)
- Postal codes: 88416
- Dialling codes: 07352
- Vehicle registration: BC
- Website: www.steinhausen-rottum.de

Steinhausen, officially Steinhausen an der Rottum (German pronunciation: [ˈʃtaɪnˌhaʊzn̩ ʔan deːɐ̯ ˈʁɔtʊm]), is a town 4 kilometres (2.5 mi) from Ochsenhausen, in the Biberach district of Baden-Württemberg, Germany.

== Population development ==
Year	1871	1910	1939	1950	1961	1970	1975	1991	1995	2005	2010	2015	2016
Population	1309	1729	1589	1660	1603	1639	1624	1719	1755	1925	1921	2003	2035

== Buildings ==
- Baroque pilgrimage church Kirche Mariä Himmelfahrt, 1672/73
- Chapel St.-Anna-Kapelle, 1592
