= Biberach (district) =

Coordinates: 48°05′N 9°50′E

- District
- Flag Coat of arms
- Country: Germany
- State: Baden-Württemberg
- Adm. region: Tübingen
- Capital: Biberach an der Riß

Government
  - District admin.: Mario Glaser

Area
  - Total: 1,409.82 km^{2} (544.33 sq mi)

Population (31 December 2022)
  - Total: 206,513
  - Density: 150/km^{2} (380/sq mi)
- Time zone: UTC+01:00 (CET)
  - Summer (DST): UTC+02:00 (CEST)
- Vehicle registration: BC
- Website: biberach.de

Biberach (German pronunciation: [ˈbiːbəʁax]) is a Landkreis (district) in Baden-Württemberg, Germany. It is bounded by (from the south and clockwise) the districts of Ravensburg, Sigmaringen, Reutlingen and Alb-Donau, and the Bavarian districts Neu-Ulm, Unterallgäu and the district-free city Memmingen. The major towns in the district of Biberach are Biberach an der Riß, Riedlingen, Ochsenhausen and Laupheim.

== Geography ==
The district consists of hilly countryside between the rivers of the Danube and the Iller. The Danube crosses the district in its westernmost part from south to north. The Iller forms the eastern border of the district. Another river is the Riss (Riß), an affluent of the Danube crossing the district from south to north.

The Federsee is a small lake in the southwest of the district. Its area is only 1.4 km^{2}, but it is famous for Neolithic findings and rare birds.

== Media ==
The local newspaper is the Schwäbische Zeitung ("Swabian Newspaper"). Biberach has also a film festival for German films which celebrated its 31st anniversary in 2009.

== Coat of arms ==
The imperial eagle symbolizes the imperial city of Biberach. Originally the coat of arms of the city showed an eagle as well as a beaver as a canting symbol. In 1488 the coat of arms of the city was changed to show only the beaver. The crosier symbolises the monasteries of the region.

== Cities and towns ==
Clickable map of municipalities in the district

Cities
Towns
1. Bad Buchau
2. Bad Schussenried
3. Biberach an der Riß
4. Laupheim
5. Ochsenhausen
6. Riedlingen
1. Achstetten
2. Alleshausen
3. Allmannsweiler
4. Altheim
5. Attenweiler
6. Berkheim
7. Betzenweiler
8. Burgrieden
9. Dettingen
10. Dürmentingen
11. Dürnau
12. Eberhardzell
13. Erlenmoos
14. Erolzheim
15. Ertingen
16. Gutenzell-Hürbel
17. Hochdorf
18. Ingoldingen
19. Kanzach
20. Kirchberg an der Iller
21. Kirchdorf an der Iller
22. Langenenslingen
23. Maselheim
24. Mietingen
25. Mittelbiberach
26. Moosburg
27. Oggelshausen
28. Rot
29. Schemmerhofen
30. Schwendi
31. Seekirch
32. Steinhausen
33. Tannheim
34. Tiefenbach
35. Ummendorf
36. Unlingen
37. Uttenweiler
38. Wain
39. Warthausen
