= Kanzach =

- Municipality
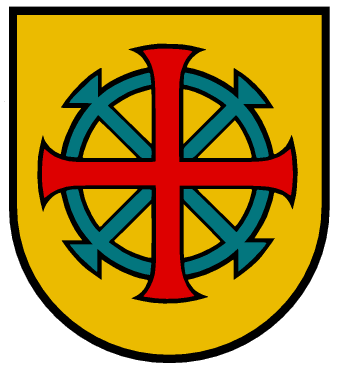
- Coat of arms

- Location of Kanzach within Biberach district
- Interactive map of Kanzach
- Location within Germany Location within Baden-Württemberg
- Coordinates: 48°4′36″N 9°33′32″E
- Country: Germany
- State: Baden-Württemberg
- Admin. region: Tübingen
- District: Biberach

Government
  - Mayor (2019–27): Klaus Schultheiß

Area
  - Total: 11.20 km^{2} (4.32 sq mi)
- Elevation: 585 m (1,919 ft)

Population (2025-12-31)
  - Total: 509
  - Density: 45.4/km^{2} (118/sq mi)
- Time zone: UTC+01:00 (CET)
  - Summer (DST): UTC+02:00 (CEST)
- Postal codes: 88422
- Dialling codes: 07582
- Vehicle registration: BC
- Website: www.gemeinde-kanzach.de

Kanzach (German pronunciation: [ˈkant͡sax]) is a town in the district of Biberach in Baden-Württemberg in Germany.

== Demographics ==
Population development:

Year	Inhabitants
1990	470
2001	515
2011	490
2021	515
