= Uttenweiler =

- Municipality
- Coat of arms

- Location of Uttenweiler within Biberach district
- Interactive map of Uttenweiler
- Location within Germany Location within Baden-Württemberg
- Coordinates: 48°8′54″N 9°36′47″E
- Country: Germany
- State: Baden-Württemberg
- Admin. region: Tübingen
- District: Biberach

Government
  - Mayor (2022–30): Werner Binder

Area
  - Total: 49.76 km^{2} (19.21 sq mi)
- Elevation: 595 m (1,952 ft)

Population (2025-12-31)
  - Total: 3,749
  - Density: 75.34/km^{2} (195.1/sq mi)
- Time zone: UTC+01:00 (CET)
  - Summer (DST): UTC+02:00 (CEST)
- Postal codes: 88524
- Dialling codes: 07374
- Vehicle registration: BC
- Website: www.uttenweiler.de

Uttenweiler (German pronunciation: [ˈʊtn̩vaɪlɐ]) is a municipality in the district of Biberach in Baden-Württemberg in Germany.

== History ==
Uttenweiler was first mentioned in 1173. The name allegedly goes back to Blessed Uta, who is said to have died in the area. For a short period of time Uttenweiler came under Austrian rule. In 1449 an Augustinian Monastery was established in Uttenweiler. As a result of the Reichsdeputationshauptschlusses Uttenweiler came under rule of the princes of Thurn und Taxis in 1803, but fell in 1806 to the kingdom of Württemberg. There it was assigned to the Oberamt Riedlingen and in 1938 to the Landkreis Saulgau. The district reform of 1973 led to the affiliation to the district of Biberach.

On 1 January 1973 the previously independent communities of Ahlen and Sauggart were incorporated into Uttenweiler. The present community of Uttenweiler was formed on 1 October 1974 by the merger of the communities of Uttenweiler, Dietershausen, Dieterskirch, Oberwachingen, and Offingen.

== Politics ==
In 2014 Werner Binder was elected as the new Mayor of Uttenweiler. He was re-elected in 2022.

=== The Village Council ===
The village council in Uttenweiler has 16 members. At the local elections on 26 May 2019, the council was elected by a majority vote. Majority elections are held if no or only one nomination has been submitted. The candidates with the highest number of votes are then elected. The municipal council consists of the honorary municipal councils and the mayor as chairman. The mayor is entitled to vote in the municipal council. The turnout was 69.5% in 2019.

=== Partner Cities ===
Uttenweiler has two partner cities:

- Oetweil am See, Switzerland
- Penig, Germany
