= Moosburg, Baden-Württemberg =

Moosburg
- Municipality
- Coat of arms

- Location of Moosburg within Biberach district
- Interactive map of Moosburg
- Location within Germany Location within Baden-Württemberg
- Coordinates: 48°5′20″N 9°35′49″E
- Country: Germany
- State: Baden-Württemberg
- Admin. region: Tübingen
- District: Biberach

Government
  - Mayor (2018–26): Klaus Gaiser

Area
  - Total: 1.85 km^{2} (0.71 sq mi)
- Elevation: 590 m (1,940 ft)

Population (2025-12-31)
  - Total: 224
  - Density: 121/km^{2} (314/sq mi)
- Time zone: UTC+01:00 (CET)
  - Summer (DST): UTC+02:00 (CEST)
- Postal codes: 88422
- Dialling codes: 07582
- Vehicle registration: BC
- Website: www.moosburg-am-federsee.de

Moosburg (German pronunciation: [ˈmoːsbʊʁk]) is a municipality in the district of Biberach in Baden-Württemberg in Germany.

== Demographics ==
Population development:

Year	Inhabitants
1990	205
2001	208
2011	228
2021	214
