= Oggelshausen =

- Municipality
- Coat of arms

- Location of Oggelshausen within Biberach district
- Interactive map of Oggelshausen
- Location within Germany Location within Baden-Württemberg
- Coordinates: 48°4′17″N 9°39′0″E
- Country: Germany
- State: Baden-Württemberg
- Admin. region: Tübingen
- District: Biberach

Government
  - Mayor (2021–29): Michael Kara

Area
  - Total: 13.12 km^{2} (5.07 sq mi)
- Elevation: 594 m (1,949 ft)

Population (2025-12-31)
  - Total: 924
  - Density: 70.4/km^{2} (182/sq mi)
- Time zone: UTC+01:00 (CET)
  - Summer (DST): UTC+02:00 (CEST)
- Postal codes: 88422
- Dialling codes: 07582
- Vehicle registration: BC
- Website: www.oggelshausen.de

Oggelshausen (German pronunciation: [ˈɔgl̩shaʊ̯zn̩]) is a municipality in the district of Biberach in Baden-Württemberg in Germany.

== Mayors ==
- 1984–2005: Alois Dangel
- 2005–2021: Ralf Kriz
- 2021– : Michael Kara
