= Dürnau, Biberach =

Dürnau
- Municipality
- Coat of arms

- Location of Dürnau within Biberach district
- Interactive map of Dürnau
- Location within Germany Location within Baden-Württemberg
- Coordinates: 48°3′37″N 9°33′17″E
- Country: Germany
- State: Baden-Württemberg
- Admin. region: Tübingen
- District: Biberach

Government
  - Mayor (2024–32): Markus Wagner

Area
  - Total: 7.28 km^{2} (2.81 sq mi)
- Elevation: 597 m (1,959 ft)

Population (2025-12-31)
  - Total: 486
  - Density: 66.8/km^{2} (173/sq mi)
- Time zone: UTC+01:00 (CET)
  - Summer (DST): UTC+02:00 (CEST)
- Postal codes: 88422
- Dialling codes: 07582
- Vehicle registration: BC

Dürnau (German pronunciation: [ˈdʏʁnaʊ]) is a municipality in the district of Biberach in Baden-Württemberg in Germany.
