= Alleshausen =

- Municipality
- Coat of arms

- Location of Alleshausen within Biberach district
- Interactive map of Alleshausen
- Location within Germany Location within Baden-Württemberg
- Coordinates: 48°6′12″N 9°37′21″E
- Country: Germany
- State: Baden-Württemberg
- Admin. region: Tübingen
- District: Biberach

Government
  - Mayor (2021–29): Patrick Walter Hepp

Area
  - Total: 11.31 km^{2} (4.37 sq mi)
- Elevation: 585 m (1,919 ft)

Population (2025-12-31)
  - Total: 538
  - Density: 47.6/km^{2} (123/sq mi)
- Time zone: UTC+01:00 (CET)
  - Summer (DST): UTC+02:00 (CEST)
- Postal codes: 88422
- Dialling codes: 07582
- Vehicle registration: BC
- Website: www.alleshausen.de

Alleshausen (German pronunciation: [ˈaləsˌhaʊ̯zn̩]) is a municipality in the district of Biberach in Baden-Württemberg in Germany.

== World Heritage Site ==
It is home to one or more prehistoric pile-dwelling (or stilt house) settlements that are part of the Prehistoric pile dwellings around the Alps, a UNESCO World Heritage Site.
