= Tiefenbach, Biberach =

Tiefenbach
- Municipality
- Coat of arms

- Location of Tiefenbach within Biberach district
- Interactive map of Tiefenbach
- Location within Germany Location within Baden-Württemberg
- Coordinates: 48°0′16″N 9°39′7″E
- Country: Germany
- State: Baden-Württemberg
- Admin. region: Tübingen
- District: Biberach

Government
  - Mayor (2017–25): Helmut Müller

Area
  - Total: 6.95 km^{2} (2.68 sq mi)
- Elevation: 588 m (1,929 ft)

Population (2025-12-31)
  - Total: 544
  - Density: 78.3/km^{2} (203/sq mi)
- Time zone: UTC+01:00 (CET)
  - Summer (DST): UTC+02:00 (CEST)
- Postal codes: 88422
- Dialling codes: 07582
- Vehicle registration: BC
- Website: www.tiefenbach-federsee.de

Tiefenbach (German pronunciation: [ˈtiːfn̩bax]) is a town in the district of Biberach in Baden-Württemberg in Germany.
