= Seekirch =

- Municipality
- Coat of arms

- Location of Seekirch within Biberach district
- Interactive map of Seekirch
- Location within Germany Location within Baden-Württemberg
- Coordinates: 48°6′21″N 9°38′30″E
- Country: Germany
- State: Baden-Württemberg
- Admin. region: Tübingen
- District: Biberach

Government
  - Mayor (2019–27): Stefan Koch

Area
  - Total: 5.77 km^{2} (2.23 sq mi)
- Elevation: 595 m (1,952 ft)

Population (2025-12-31)
  - Total: 288
  - Density: 49.9/km^{2} (129/sq mi)
- Time zone: UTC+01:00 (CET)
  - Summer (DST): UTC+02:00 (CEST)
- Postal codes: 88422
- Dialling codes: 07582
- Vehicle registration: BC
- Website: www.seekirch.de

Seekirch (German pronunciation: [ˈzeːkɪʁç]) is a municipality in the district of Biberach in Baden-Württemberg in Germany.
