= Tübingen (region) =

Coordinates: 48°10′N 9°30′E

- Regierungsbezirk
- Map of Baden-Württemberg highlighting Tübingen
- Country: Germany
- State: Baden-Württemberg
- Region seat: Tübingen

Government
  - District President: Klaus Tappeser (CDU)

Area
  - Total: 8,917.82 km^{2} (3,443.19 sq mi)

Population (31 December 2025)
  - Total: 1,904,744
  - Density: 213.589/km^{2} (553.192/sq mi)

GDP
  - Total: €103.529 billion (2024)
  - Per capita: €54,374 (2024)
- Website: https://rp.baden-wuerttemberg.de/rpt/Seiten/default.aspx

Tübingen is one of the four Administrative Regions (Regierungsbezirke) of Baden-Württemberg, Germany, located in the south-east of the state. It covers most of the German shore of Lake Constance (Bodensee), and also the beginning of the Danube River valley. It is sub-divided into the three regions (Regionalverband): Neckar-Alb, Donau-Iller and Bodensee-Oberschwaben. Donau-Iller also includes three districts and one city of Bavaria.

Kreise
(districts)
1. Alb Donau
2. Biberach
3. Bodensee
4. Ravensburg
5. Reutlingen
6. Sigmaringen
7. Tübingen
8. Zollernalbkreis
Kreisfreie Städte
(district-free towns)
1. Ulm

== Economy ==
The gross domestic product (GDP) of the region was €80.8 billion in 2018, accounting for 2.4% of German economic output. GDP per capita adjusted for purchasing power was €40,100 or 133% of the EU27 average in the same year. The GDP per employee was 108% of the EU average. This makes it one of the wealthiest regions in Germany and Europe.
