= Ravensburg (Landtag electoral district) =

State electoral district of Germany

69: Ravensburg
- Electoral district for the Landtag of Baden-Württemberg
- Ravensburg in 2026
- District: Ravensburg and Bodenseekreis
- Electorate: 127,950 (2026)
- Major settlements: Altshausen, Baienfurt, Baindt, Berg, Bodnegg, Boms, Ebenweiler, Ebersbach-Musbach, Eichstegen, Fleischwangen, Fronreute, Grünkraut, Guggenhausen, Horgenzell, Hoßkirch, Königseggwald, Ravensburg, Riedhausen, Schlier, Unterwaldhausen, Waldburg, Weingarten, Wilhelmsdorf, Wolpertswende, Meckenbeuren, Neukirch, and Tettnang

Current electoral district
- Party: CDU
- Member: Antje Rommelspacher

Ravensburg is an electoral constituency (German: Wahlkreis) represented in the Landtag of Baden-Württemberg. Since 2026, it has elected one member via first-past-the-post voting. Voters cast a second vote under which additional seats are allocated proportionally state-wide. Under the constituency numbering system, it is designated as constituency 69. It is split between the districts of Ravensburg and Bodenseekreis.

== Geography ==
The constituency includes –

- The municipalities of Altshausen, Baienfurt, Baindt, Berg, Bodnegg, Boms, Ebenweiler, Ebersbach-Musbach, Eichstegen, Fleischwangen, Fronreute, Grünkraut, Guggenhausen, Horgenzell, Hoßkirch, Königseggwald, Ravensburg, Riedhausen, Schlier, Unterwaldhausen, Waldburg, Weingarten, Wilhelmsdorf, and Wolpertswende, within the district of Ravensburg.
- The municipalities of Meckenbeuren, Neukirch, Tettnang, within the district of Bodenseekreis.

There were 127,950 eligible voters in 2026.

== Members ==
=== First mandate ===
Both prior to and since the electoral reforms for the 2026 election, the winner of the plurality of the vote (first-past-the-post) in every constituency won the first mandate.

Election	Member	Party	%
1976	Alfons Maurer	CDU	
1980	Alfons Maurer	CDU	
1984	Alfons Maurer	CDU	
1988	Alfons Maurer	CDU	
Feb 1990	Rudolf Köberle	CDU	
1992	Rudolf Köberle	CDU	
1996	Rudolf Köberle	CDU	
2001	Rudolf Köberle	CDU	
2006	Rudolf Köberle	CDU	49.4
2011	Rudolf Köberle	CDU	43.5
2016	Manfred Lucha	Grüne	33.1
2021	Manfred Lucha	Grüne	33.1
2026	Antje Rommelspacher	CDU	38.4

=== Second mandate ===
Prior to the electoral reforms for the 2026 election, the seats in the state parliament were allocated proportionately amongst parties which received more than 5% of valid votes across the state. The seats that were won proportionally for parties that did not win as many first mandates as seats they were entitled to, were allocated to their candidates which received the highest proportion of the vote in their respective constituencies. This meant that following some elections, a constituency would have one or more members elected under a second mandate.

Prior to 2011, these second mandates were allocated to the party candidates who got the greatest number of votes, whilst from 2011-2021, these were allocated according to percentage share of the vote.

Prior to 2011, this constituency did not elect any members on a second mandate.

Election	Member	Party
2011	Manfred Lucha	Grüne
2016	August Schuler	CDU
2021	August Schuler	CDU

== Election results ==
=== 2026 election ===
State election (2026): Ravensburg
Notes:	Blue background denotes the winner of the electorate vote. Pink background denotes a candidate elected from their party list. Yellow background denotes an electorate win by a list member, or other incumbent. A ✓ or ✗ denotes status of any incumbent, win or lose respectively.						
Party	Candidate	Votes	%	±%	Party votes	%	±%
CDU	Antje Rommelspacher	34,145	38.4	▲14.8	29,820	33.4	▲9.8
Greens	Anna Wiech	22,338	25.1	▼8.0	26,633	29.8	▼3.3
AfD	Hans-Peter Baur	15,730	17.7	▲9.0	15,454	17.3	▲8.6
SPD	Paul Frank	5,846	6.6	▼1.7	3,687	4.1	▼4.1
FDP	Anja Widenmann	4,913	5.5	▼5.9	3,923	4.4	▼7.1
Left	Tim Wetzel	4,213	4.7	▲1.3	3,528	4.0	▲0.6
FW					1,908	2.1	▼1.7
BSW					1,227	1.4	
Volt	Mario Zitterich	1,663	1.9	▲1.3	841	0.9	▲0.4
APT					627	0.7	
PARTEI					347	0.4	▼1.3
ÖDP					284	0.3	▼1.3
dieBasis					244	0.3	▼1.0
Bündnis C					149	0.2	
Pensioners					142	0.2	
Values					126	0.1	
Team Todenhöfer					98	0.1	
PdF					71	0.1	
Verjüngungsforschung					50	0.1	
KlimalisteBW					46	0.1	▼1.2
Humanists					33	0.0	
Informal votes		912			522		
Total valid votes		88,848			89,238		
Turnout		89,760	70.2	▲4.8			
CDU gain from Greens	Majority	11,807	13.3				

== See also ==
- Politics of Baden-Württemberg
- Landtag of Baden-Württemberg
