= Zollernalb – Sigmaringen =

Federal electoral district of Germany

295 Zollernalb – Sigmaringen
- Electoral district for the Bundestag
- Zollernalb – Sigmaringen in 2025
- State: Baden-Württemberg
- Population: 248,800 (2019)
- Electorate: 182,648 (2021)
- Major settlements: Albstadt; Balingen; Bad Saulgau
- Area: 1,656.3 km^{2}

Current electoral district
- Created: 1949
- Party: CDU
- Member: Thomas Bareiß
- Elected: 2005, 2009, 2013, 2017, 2021, 2025

Zollernalb – Sigmaringen is an electoral constituency (German: Wahlkreis) represented in the Bundestag. It elects one member via first-past-the-post voting. Under the current constituency numbering system, it is designated as constituency 295. It is located in southern Baden-Württemberg, comprising most of the district of Sigmaringen and Zollernalbkreis districts.

Zollernalb – Sigmaringen was created for the inaugural 1949 federal election. Since 2005, it has been represented by Thomas Bareiß of the Christian Democratic Union (CDU).

== Geography ==
Zollernalb – Sigmaringen is located in southern Baden-Württemberg. As of the 2021 federal election, it comprises the district of Sigmaringen excluding the municipalities of Herdwangen-Schönach, Illmensee, Pfullendorf, and Wald as well as the district of Zollernalbkreis excluding the municipalities of Bisingen, Burladingen, Grosselfingen, Hechingen, Jungingen, and Rangendingen.

== History ==
Zollernalb – Sigmaringen was created in 1949, then known as Balingen. It acquired its current name in the 1980 election. In the 1949 election, it was Württemberg-Hohenzollern constituency 4 in the numbering system. In the 1953 through 1961 elections, it was number 193. In the 1965 through 1976 elections, it was number 197. In the 1980 through 1998 elections, it was number 198. Since the 2002 election, it has been number 295.

Originally, the constituency comprised the districts of Balingen, Sigmaringen, Hechingen, and Münsingen. In the 1965 through 1976 elections, it comprised the districts of Balingen, Münsingen, Sigmaringen excluding the municipalities of Igelswies, Thalheim, Bärenthal, Beuron, Billafingen, Burgau, Langenenslingen and Achberg, and Hechingen excluding the municipality of Wilflingen, as well as the municipalities of St. Johann, Dettingen an der Erms, Grabenstetten, Hülben, and Bad Urach from the Reutlingen district and the municipality of Wangen from the Überlingen district.

In the 1980 through 1998 elections, it acquired a configuration similar to its current borders, but including the entirety of the Sigmaringen district. In the 2002 election, it also contained the municipalities of Altshausen, Boms, Ebenweiler, Ebersbach-Musbach, Eichstegen, Fleischwangen, Guggenhausen, Hoßkirch, Königseggwald, Riedhausen, and Unterwaldhausen from the Ravensburg district. In the 2009 election, it lost its area in the Ravensburg district as well as the municipalities of Herdwangen-Schönach, Illmensee, Pfullendorf, and Wald from the Sigmaringen district.

Election	No.	Name	Borders
1949	4	Balingen	Balingen district; Sigmaringen district; Hechingen district; Münsingen district
1953	193	Balingen	Balingen district; Sigmaringen district; Hechingen district; Münsingen district
1957	193	Balingen	Balingen district; Sigmaringen district; Hechingen district; Münsingen district
1961	193	Balingen	Balingen district; Sigmaringen district; Hechingen district; Münsingen district
1965	197	Balingen	Balingen district; Sigmaringen district (excluding Igelswies, Thalheim, Bärenthal, Beuron, Billafingen, Burgau, Langenenslingen and Achberg municipalities); Hechingen district (excluding Wilflingen municipality); Münsingen district; Reutlingen district (only St. Johann, Dettingen an der Erms, Grabenstetten, Hülben, and Bad Urach municipalities); Überlingen district (only Wangen municipality)
1969	197	Balingen	Balingen district; Sigmaringen district (excluding Igelswies, Thalheim, Bärenthal, Beuron, Billafingen, Burgau, Langenenslingen and Achberg municipalities); Hechingen district (excluding Wilflingen municipality); Münsingen district; Reutlingen district (only St. Johann, Dettingen an der Erms, Grabenstetten, Hülben, and Bad Urach municipalities); Überlingen district (only Wangen municipality)
1972	197	Balingen	Balingen district; Sigmaringen district (excluding Igelswies, Thalheim, Bärenthal, Beuron, Billafingen, Burgau, Langenenslingen and Achberg municipalities); Hechingen district (excluding Wilflingen municipality); Münsingen district; Reutlingen district (only St. Johann, Dettingen an der Erms, Grabenstetten, Hülben, and Bad Urach municipalities); Überlingen district (only Wangen municipality)
1976	197	Balingen	Balingen district; Sigmaringen district (excluding Igelswies, Thalheim, Bärenthal, Beuron, Billafingen, Burgau, Langenenslingen and Achberg municipalities); Hechingen district (excluding Wilflingen municipality); Münsingen district; Reutlingen district (only St. Johann, Dettingen an der Erms, Grabenstetten, Hülben, and Bad Urach municipalities); Überlingen district (only Wangen municipality)
1980	198	Zollernalb – Sigmaringen	Sigmaringen district; Zollernalbkreis district (excluding Bisingen, Burladingen, Grosselfingen, Hechingen, Jungingen, and Rangendingen municipalities)
1983	198	Zollernalb – Sigmaringen	Sigmaringen district; Zollernalbkreis district (excluding Bisingen, Burladingen, Grosselfingen, Hechingen, Jungingen, and Rangendingen municipalities)
1987	198	Zollernalb – Sigmaringen	Sigmaringen district; Zollernalbkreis district (excluding Bisingen, Burladingen, Grosselfingen, Hechingen, Jungingen, and Rangendingen municipalities)
1990	198	Zollernalb – Sigmaringen	Sigmaringen district; Zollernalbkreis district (excluding Bisingen, Burladingen, Grosselfingen, Hechingen, Jungingen, and Rangendingen municipalities)
1994	198	Zollernalb – Sigmaringen	Sigmaringen district; Zollernalbkreis district (excluding Bisingen, Burladingen, Grosselfingen, Hechingen, Jungingen, and Rangendingen municipalities)
1998	198	Zollernalb – Sigmaringen	Sigmaringen district; Zollernalbkreis district (excluding Bisingen, Burladingen, Grosselfingen, Hechingen, Jungingen, and Rangendingen municipalities)
2002	295	Zollernalb – Sigmaringen	Sigmaringen district; Zollernalbkreis district (excluding Bisingen, Burladingen, Grosselfingen, Hechingen, Jungingen, and Rangendingen municipalities); Ravensburg district (only Altshausen, Boms, Ebenweiler, Ebersbach-Musbach, Eichstegen, Fleischwangen, Guggenhausen, Hoßkirch, Königseggwald, Riedhausen, and Unterwaldhausen municipalities)
2005	295	Zollernalb – Sigmaringen	Sigmaringen district; Zollernalbkreis district (excluding Bisingen, Burladingen, Grosselfingen, Hechingen, Jungingen, and Rangendingen municipalities); Ravensburg district (only Altshausen, Boms, Ebenweiler, Ebersbach-Musbach, Eichstegen, Fleischwangen, Guggenhausen, Hoßkirch, Königseggwald, Riedhausen, and Unterwaldhausen municipalities)
2009	295	Zollernalb – Sigmaringen	Sigmaringen district (excluding Herdwangen-Schönach, Illmensee, Pfullendorf, and Wald municipalities); Zollernalbkreis district (excluding Bisingen, Burladingen, Grosselfingen, Hechingen, Jungingen, and Rangendingen municipalities)
2013	295	Zollernalb – Sigmaringen	Sigmaringen district (excluding Herdwangen-Schönach, Illmensee, Pfullendorf, and Wald municipalities); Zollernalbkreis district (excluding Bisingen, Burladingen, Grosselfingen, Hechingen, Jungingen, and Rangendingen municipalities)
2017	295	Zollernalb – Sigmaringen	Sigmaringen district (excluding Herdwangen-Schönach, Illmensee, Pfullendorf, and Wald municipalities); Zollernalbkreis district (excluding Bisingen, Burladingen, Grosselfingen, Hechingen, Jungingen, and Rangendingen municipalities)
2021	295	Zollernalb – Sigmaringen	Sigmaringen district (excluding Herdwangen-Schönach, Illmensee, Pfullendorf, and Wald municipalities); Zollernalbkreis district (excluding Bisingen, Burladingen, Grosselfingen, Hechingen, Jungingen, and Rangendingen municipalities)
2025	295	Zollernalb – Sigmaringen	Sigmaringen district (excluding Herdwangen-Schönach, Illmensee, Pfullendorf, and Wald municipalities); Zollernalbkreis district (excluding Bisingen, Burladingen, Grosselfingen, Hechingen, Jungingen, and Rangendingen municipalities)

== Members ==
The constituency has been held continuously by the Christian Democratic Union (CDU) since its creation. It was first represented by Franz Weiß from 1949 to 1953, followed by Gebhard Müller from 1953 to 1957 and Walter Gaßmann from 1957 to 1965. Hermann Schwörer was representative from 1965 to 1994, a total of eight consecutive terms. Dietmar Schlee served from 1994 to 2002, followed by Tanja Gönner from 2002 to 2005. Thomas Bareiß has been representative since 2005.

Election	Member	Party	%
1949	Franz Weiß	CDU	59.3
1953	Gebhard Müller	CDU	61.2
1957	Walter Gaßmann	CDU	59.5
1961	Walter Gaßmann	CDU	53.6
1965	Hermann Schwörer	CDU	59.9
1969	Hermann Schwörer	CDU	63.0
1972	Hermann Schwörer	CDU	62.1
1976	Hermann Schwörer	CDU	64.1
1980	Hermann Schwörer	CDU	63.6
1983	Hermann Schwörer	CDU	69.8
1987	Hermann Schwörer	CDU	62.7
1990	Hermann Schwörer	CDU	59.6
1994	Dietmar Schlee	CDU	56.5
1998	Dietmar Schlee	CDU	49.8
2002	Tanja Gönner	CDU	54.9
2005	Thomas Bareiß	CDU	55.3
2009	Thomas Bareiß	CDU	49.4
2013	Thomas Bareiß	CDU	60.7
2017	Thomas Bareiß	CDU	45.0
2021	Thomas Bareiß	CDU	30.1
2025	Thomas Bareiß	CDU	37.1

== Election results ==
=== 2025 election ===
Federal election (2025): Zollernalb – Sigmaringen
Notes:	Blue background denotes the winner of the electorate vote. Pink background denotes a candidate elected from their party list. Yellow background denotes an electorate win by a list member, or other incumbent. A ✓ or ✗ denotes status of any incumbent, win or lose respectively.						
Party	Candidate	Votes	%	±%	Party votes	%	±%
CDU	✓ Thomas Bareiß	54,652	37.1	▲7.0	54,043	36.5	▲7.7
AfD	Lukas von Berg	38,498	26.2	▲14.8	38,788	26.2	▲14.2
SPD	Robin Mesarosch	28,895	19.6	▲1.3	16,343	11.0	▼8.5
Greens	Simon Schutz	7,836	5.3	▼11.6	11,151	7.5	▼3.8
BSW					6,193	4.2	
FDP	Boris Kraft	6,169	4.2	▼9.5	8,083	5.5	▼11.5
Left	Elena Krein	5,850	4.0	▲1.9	7,256	4.9	▲2.3
FW	Thomas Weber	3,849	2.6	▲0.2	2,053	1.4	▼0.5
Tierschutzpartei					1,305	0.9	▼0.5
BD	Jan Schumacher	1,094	0.7		366	0.2	
Volt					654	0.4	▲0.3
PARTEI				▼1.4	613	0.4	▼0.6
dieBasis				▼2.9	455	0.3	▼1.9
MLPD	Renate Schmidt	318	0.2	▲0.1	101	0.1	0.0
ÖDP				▼0.6	285	0.2	▼0.1
Bündnis C					232	0.2	0.0
Team Todenhöfer							▼0.4
Pirates							▼0.4
Gesundheitsforschung							▼0.1
Humanists							▼0.1
Informal votes		1,625			865		
Total valid votes		147,161			147,921		
Turnout		148,786	8203	▲6.7			
CDU hold	Majority	16,154	10.9				

=== 2021 election ===
Federal election (2021): Zollernalb – Sigmaringen
Notes:	Blue background denotes the winner of the electorate vote. Pink background denotes a candidate elected from their party list. Yellow background denotes an electorate win by a list member, or other incumbent. A ✓ or ✗ denotes status of any incumbent, win or lose respectively.						
Party	Candidate	Votes	%	±%	Party votes	%	±%
CDU	✓ Thomas Bareiß	41,106	30.1	▼14.8	39,332	28.8	▼9.2
SPD	Robin Mesarosch	24,970	18.3	▲3.9	26,716	19.6	▲5.4
Greens	Johannes Kretschmann	23,118	16.9	▲4.2	15,503	11.4	▼0.1
FDP	Stephan Link	18,678	13.7	▲4.4	23,200	17.0	▲3.6
AfD	Nicolas Gregg	15,554	11.4	▼2.2	16,477	12.1	▼1.6
dieBasis	Volker Beil	3,906	2.9		2,980	2.2	
FW	Jürgen Schiller	3,359	2.5		2,617	1.9	▲1.2
Left	Marco Hausner	2,848	2.1	▼2.6	3,540	2.6	▼2.5
Tierschutzpartei					1,883	1.4	▲0.5
PARTEI	Dominik Ochs	1,887	1.4		1,335	1.0	▲0.5
Team Todenhöfer					545	0.4	
Pirates					510	0.4	▼0.1
ÖDP	Christine Koch-Kuhring	758	0.6		429	0.3	0.0
Bündnis C					258	0.2	
Volt					258	0.2	
NPD					206	0.2	▼0.2
Gesundheitsforschung					182	0.1	
Bürgerbewegung					167	0.1	
MLPD	Renate Schmidt	212	0.2	▼0.2	114	0.1	0.0
Humanists					111	0.1	
DiB					83	0.1	0.0
Bündnis 21					47	0.0	
LKR					30	0.0	
DKP					17	0.0	0.0
Informal votes		1,688			1,544		
Total valid votes		136,396			136,540		
Turnout		138,084	75.6	▼0.4			
CDU hold	Majority	16,136	11.8	▼18.7			

=== 2017 election ===
Federal election (2017): Zollernalb – Sigmaringen
Notes:	Blue background denotes the winner of the electorate vote. Pink background denotes a candidate elected from their party list. Yellow background denotes an electorate win by a list member, or other incumbent. A ✓ or ✗ denotes status of any incumbent, win or lose respectively.						
Party	Candidate	Votes	%	±%	Party votes	%	±%
CDU	✓ Thomas Bareiß	61,694	45.0	▼15.7	52,284	38.0	▼14.8
SPD	Stiliani Kirgiane-Efremidou	19,716	14.4	▼3.8	19,446	14.1	▼3.0
AfD	Hans-Peter Hörner	18,609	13.6		18,814	13.7	▲9.0
Greens	Erwin Feucht	17,489	12.7	▲4.5	15,798	11.5	▲3.1
FDP	Dirk Mrotzek	12,695	9.3	▲6.9	18,394	13.4	▲7.7
Left	Claudio Wellington	6,450	4.7	▲0.5	7,061	5.1	▲1.0
Tierschutzpartei					1,182	0.9	▲0.1
FW					1,018	0.7	▼0.2
PARTEI					722	0.5	
Pirates					590	0.4	▼1.7
NPD					519	0.4	▼1.0
ÖDP					378	0.3	▼0.1
Tierschutzallianz					326	0.2	
DM					245	0.2	
BGE					222	0.2	
Menschliche Welt					206	0.1	
V-Partei³					176	0.1	
MLPD	Renate Schmidt	541	0.4	0.0	173	0.1	0.0
DiB					118	0.1	
DIE RECHTE					41	0.0	
DKP					14	0.0	
Informal votes		2,354			1,821		
Total valid votes		137,194			137,727		
Turnout		139,548	76.0	▲3.9			
CDU hold	Majority	41,978	30.6	▼11.9			

=== 2013 election ===
Federal election (2013): Zollernalb – Sigmaringen
Notes:	Blue background denotes the winner of the electorate vote. Pink background denotes a candidate elected from their party list. Yellow background denotes an electorate win by a list member, or other incumbent. A ✓ or ✗ denotes status of any incumbent, win or lose respectively.						
Party	Candidate	Votes	%	±%	Party votes	%	±%
CDU	✓ Thomas Bareiß	78,966	60.7	▲11.2	69,176	52.8	▲13.8
SPD	Stella Kirgiane-Efremidis	23,684	18.2	▲1.1	22,447	17.1	▲1.5
Greens	Roman-Hartmut Wauer	10,802	8.3	▼1.0	11,008	8.4	▼1.4
Left	Daniel Morteza Ghazvini	5,460	4.2	▼2.3	5,359	4.1	▼2.8
FW	Günther Schunder	3,716	2.9		1,222	0.9	
FDP	Dirk Mrotzeck	3,069	2.4	▼11.2	7,393	5.6	▼15.8
AfD					6,161	4.7	
Pirates					2,746	2.1	▲0.2
NPD	Hans Schmidt	2,756	2.1	▼0.2	1,854	1.4	▼0.2
Tierschutzpartei					1,012	0.8	0.0
REP					668	0.5	▼0.7
ÖDP	Hubert Rothfeld	1,194	0.9		543	0.4	0.0
RENTNER					328	0.3	
PBC					289	0.2	▼0.2
Volksabstimmung					282	0.2	▼0.2
MLPD	Renate Schmidt	544	0.4		198	0.2	0.0
Party of Reason					161	0.1	
PRO					132	0.1	
BIG					45	0.0	
BüSo					37	0.0	0.0
Informal votes		2,714			1,844		
Total valid votes		130,191			131,061		
Turnout		132,905	72.1	▲1.9			
CDU hold	Majority	55,282	42.5	▲10.2			

=== 2009 election ===
Federal election (2009): Zollernalb – Sigmaringen
Notes:	Blue background denotes the winner of the electorate vote. Pink background denotes a candidate elected from their party list. Yellow background denotes an electorate win by a list member, or other incumbent. A ✓ or ✗ denotes status of any incumbent, win or lose respectively.						
Party	Candidate	Votes	%	±%	Party votes	%	±%
CDU	✓ Thomas Bareiß	62,858	49.4	▼5.9	49,774	38.9	▼8.3
SPD	Angela Godawa	21,695	17.1	▼9.2	20,001	15.6	▼9.5
FDP	Wolfgang Dobler	17,220	13.5	▲8.0	27,454	21.5	▲9.6
Greens	Susanne Kieckbusch	11,802	9.3	▲3.6	12,571	9.8	▲3.0
Left	Antje Claaßen	8,292	6.5	▲3.6	8,763	6.9	▲3.6
Pirates					2,477	1.9	
NPD	Hans Schmidt	2,895	2.3	▲0.2	2,036	1.6	▲0.2
Independent	Oskar Löffler	2,431	1.9				
REP					1,527	1.2	▼0.5
Tierschutzpartei					956	0.7	
PBC					600	0.5	▼0.2
ÖDP					572	0.4	
Volksabstimmung					385	0.3	
DIE VIOLETTEN					297	0.2	
MLPD					137	0.1	▼0.1
DVU					114	0.1	
ADM					86	0.1	
BüSo					65	0.1	0.0
Informal votes		3,243			2,621		
Total valid votes		127,193			127,815		
Turnout		130,436	70.2	▼6.4			
CDU hold	Majority	41,163	32.3	▲3.3			

=== 2005 election ===
Federal election (2005):Zollernalb – Sigmaringen
Notes:	Blue background denotes the winner of the electorate vote. Pink background denotes a candidate elected from their party list. Yellow background denotes an electorate win by a list member, or other incumbent. A ✓ or ✗ denotes status of any incumbent, win or lose respectively.						
Party	Candidate	Votes	%	±%	Party votes	%	±%
CDU	Thomas Bareiß	86,282	55.5	▲0.6	74,266	47.6	▼5.2
SPD	Matthias Seitz	40,184	25.8	▼3.2	38,518	24.7	▼3.0
Greens	Susanne Kieckbusch	9,091	5.8	▲0.4	11,096	7.1	▼0.3
FDP	Wolfgang Dobler	8,706	5.6	▼0.6	18,563	11.9	▲4.6
Left	Andrea Kunz	4,583	2.9	▲2.3	4,981	3.2	▲2.5
Familie	Martin Egerer	3,553	2.3		1,981	1.3	
NPD	Hans Schmidt	3,100	2.0		2,073	1.3	▲1.0
REP					2,531	1.6	▼0.1
PBC					1,000	0.6	0.0
GRAUEN					769	0.5	▲0.3
MLPD					25	0.2	
BüSo					120	0.1	▲0.1
Informal votes		3,942			3,298		
Total valid votes		155,499			156,143		
Turnout		159,441	76.5	▼3.2			
CDU hold	Majority	46,098	29.7				
