= Bad Saulgau =

- Town
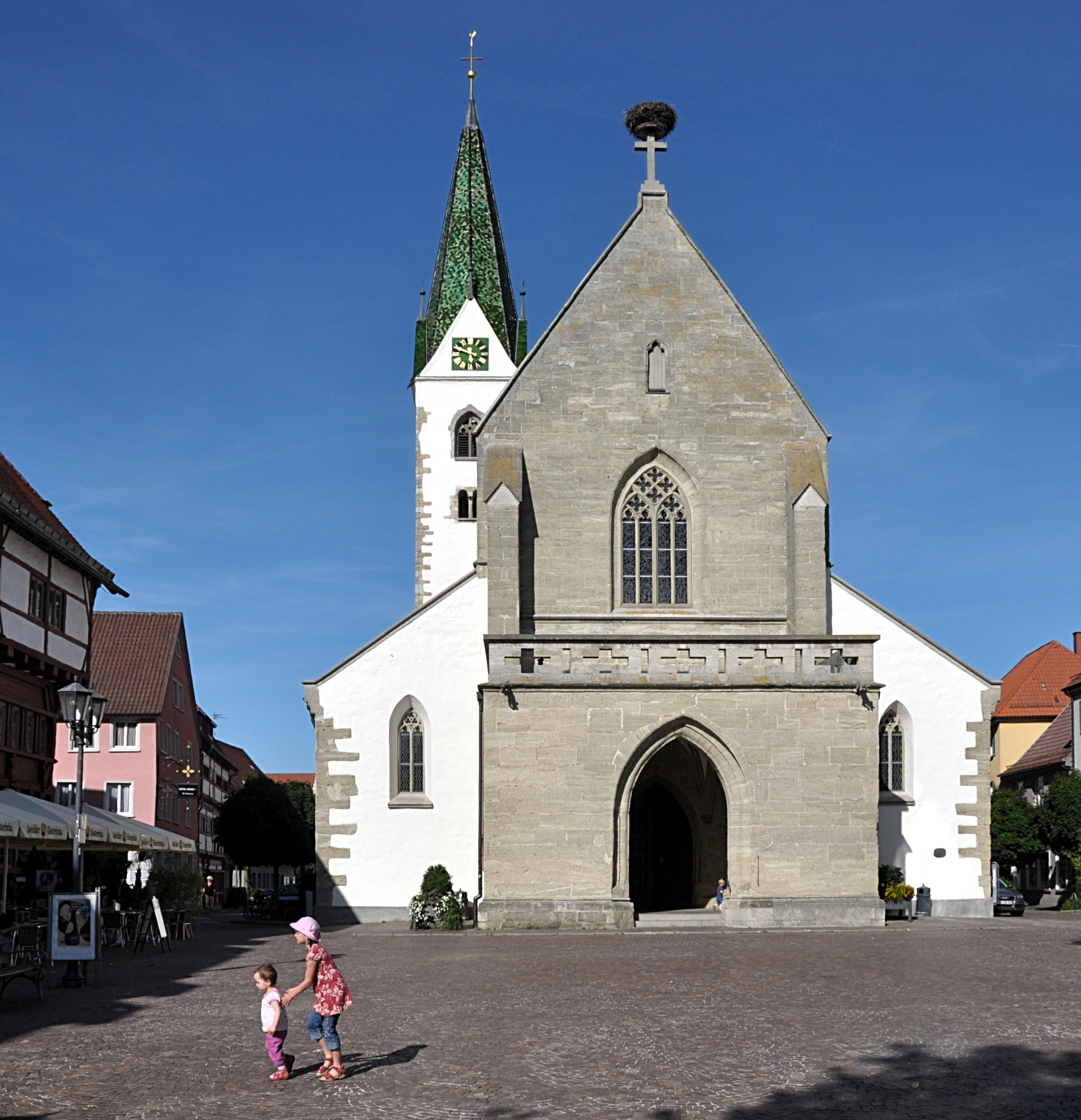
- Saint John the Baptist Church

- Coat of arms

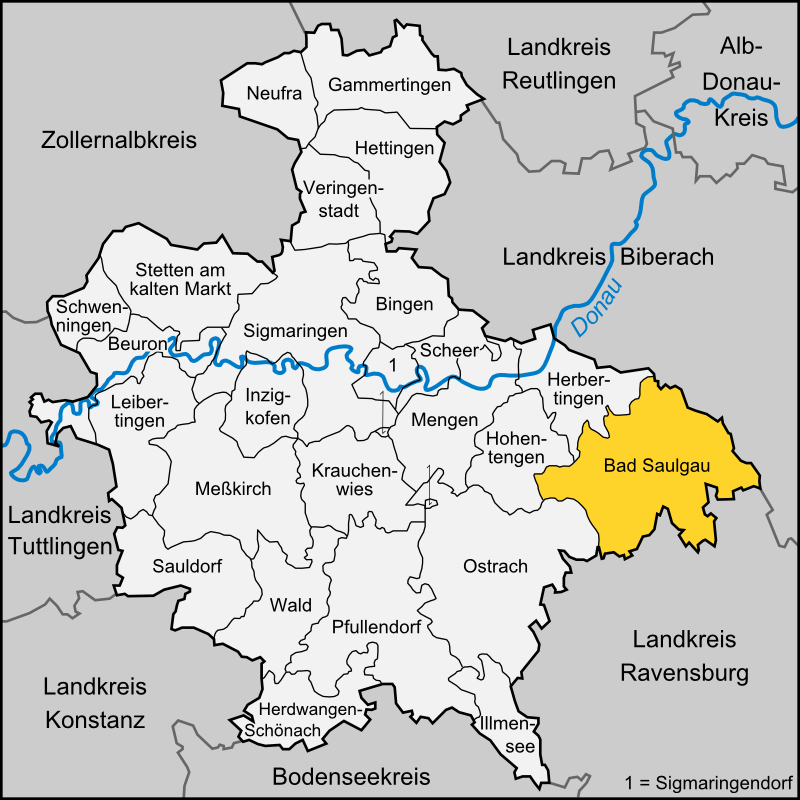
- Location of Bad Saulgau within Sigmaringen district
- Interactive map of Bad Saulgau
- Location within Germany Location within Baden-Württemberg
- Coordinates: 48°1′3″N 9°30′1″E
- Country: Germany
- State: Baden-Württemberg
- Admin. region: Tübingen
- District: Sigmaringen
- Subdivisions: 14

Government
  - Mayor (2023–31): Raphael Osmakowski-Miller

Area
  - Total: 97.33 km^{2} (37.58 sq mi)
- Elevation: 587 m (1,926 ft)

Population (2025-12-31)
  - Total: 17,824
  - Density: 183.1/km^{2} (474.3/sq mi)
- Time zone: UTC+01:00 (CET)
  - Summer (DST): UTC+02:00 (CEST)
- Postal codes: 88348
- Dialling codes: 07581
- Vehicle registration: SIG or SLG
- Website: www.bad-saulgau.de

Bad Saulgau (German pronunciation: [baːt ˈzaʊlɡaʊ]) is a town in the district of Sigmaringen, in Baden-Württemberg, Germany. It is situated 23 km east of Sigmaringen, and 27 km north of Ravensburg between the Danube and Lake Constance.

== Geography ==
Bad Saulgau is located north of the wooded hills Wagenhart and a few kilometers west-northwest of the hill Atzenberger Höhe. It is located between the Danube and Lake Constance, on the Danube tributary Schwarzach. The European watershed, which separates the catchment areas of the Rhine and the Danube, runs through the municipal district Lampertsweiler. The waters flowing southward eventually join the Rhine, the northbound ones the Danube.

=== Neighboring communities ===
Bad Saulgau borders the following municipalities, clockwise starting from the North: Ertingen, Riedlingen, Allmannsweiler, Bad Buchau, Dürnau, Bad Schussenried, Ebersbach-Musbach, Boms, Eichstegen, Hoßkirch, Ostrach, Hohentengen and Herbertingen.

=== Subdivisions ===
Bad Saulgau consists of the main town (with Bernhausen, Enge Weiler, Schwarzach and Wilfertsweiler) and 13 Ortsteile.

Coat of arms	District	Inhabitants	Area
Bad Saulgau	Bad Saulgau (main locality)	11,673	5690 ha
Bierstetten	Bierstetten and Steinbronnen	591	615 ha
Bolstern	Bolstern and Heratskirch	417	1206 ha
Bondorf	Bondorf	333	278 ha
Braunenweiler	Braunenweiler/Untereggartsweiler	553	1005 ha
Friedberg	Friedberg	406	541 ha
Fulgenstadt	Fulgenstadt	672	673 ha
Großtissen	Großtissen and Kleintissen	374	669 ha
Haid	Haid-Sießen-Bogenweiler	874	1320 ha
Hochberg	Hochberg and Luditsweiler	579	664 ha
Lampertsweiler	Lampertsweiler	302	252 ha
Moosheim	Moosheim	337	443 ha
Renhardsweiler	Renhardsweiler	273	170 ha
Wolfartsweiler	Wolfartsweiler	275	351 ha

== History ==
The first historical reference to the settlement dates back to 819. In 1239, it received town privileges from Frederick II, Holy Roman Emperor. The town became a possession of the House of Habsburg in 1299, and thus part of Further Austria. In Napoleonic times, it was incorporated into the Kingdom of Württemberg.

During World War II, a subcamp of the Dachau concentration camp was located in the town. In 2005, a memorial commemorating the camp and the victims was inaugurated at the camp's former location.

After World War II, Saulgau was part of the French occupation zone in 1945 and became part of the newly founded state of Württemberg-Hohenzollern in 1947, which was incorporated into the state of Baden-Württemberg in 1952.

In 2000, the name of the town was officially changed from Saulgau to Bad Saulgau, where the German Bad refers to its spa facilities and important natural thermal source.

== Education ==
Apart from nursery schools, Bad Saulgau has several public schools from primary to secondary level, for vocational training as well as a centre for secondary schools specialised in economics or technical training. (Technisches Gymnasium, Wirtschaftsgymnasium)

The Toin Gakuen Schule Deutschland, a Japanese international boarding secondary school, was previously located in Bad Saulgau, but closed in 2012.

== Notable people ==
- Sebastian Rentz (born 1799), a German-American winemaker in Cincinnati, Ohio, who produced sparkling Catawba wine
- Erik E. Lehmann (born 1963), economist

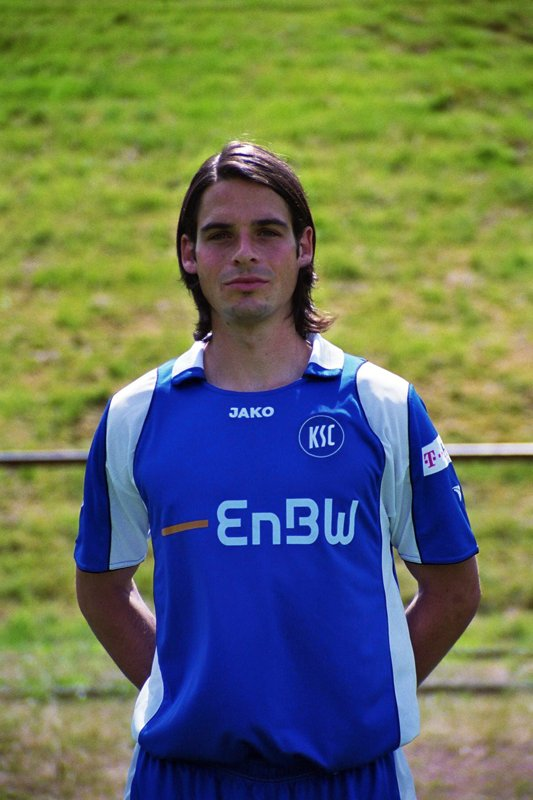
Stefan Buck, 2007

=== Sport ===
- Franz Michelberger (born 1955), retired football player, played 306 games
- Stefan Buck (born 1980), retired football player, played 359 games
- Fabian Gerster (born 1986), football player, plated 151 games
- Tatjana Maria (born 1987), tennis player
- Christian Sauter (born 1988), footballer who has played over 250 games
- Isabelle Harle (born 1988), swimmer and multiple German champion, world and European champion
- Armend Kabashi (born 1995), a Finnish footballer who has played over 250 games
