= Königsegg-Aulendorf =

Former county of southeastern Baden-Württemberg, Germany

Coordinates: 47°57′15″N 9°38′20″E

Barony (County) of Königsegg-Aulendorf Freiherrschaft (Grafschaft) Königsegg-Aulendorf
- 1622–1806
- Coat of arms
- Status: County
- Capital: Aulendorf
- Historical era: Early modern period
  - Partitioned from Königsegg: 1622
  - Raised to county: 1629
  - Inherited Königsegg: 1663
  - Mediatised to Württemberg: 1806
Preceded by	Succeeded by
Königsegg	Kingdom of Württemberg

Königsegg-Aulendorf was a county of southeastern Baden-Württemberg, Germany. It was created in 1622 as a baronial partition of the Barony of Königsegg, and it was raised to a county in 1629.

By 1806, the territories of Königsegg-Aulendorf were four separate exclaves, centred on Königsegg in the west, Aulendorf in the east, and two smaller territories (north and south) of the Teutonic Knights' territory at Altshausen. Königsegg-Aulendorf was mediatised to the Kingdom of Württemberg in 1806.

== Baron of Königsegg-Aulendorf (1622–29) ==
- John George (1622–1629)

== Counts of Königsegg-Aulendorf (1629–1806) ==
- John George (1629–1666)
- Anthony Eusebius (1666–1692)
- Francis Maximilian (1692–1710)
- Charles Siegfried (1710–1765)
- Herman Frederick (1765–1786)
- Ernest (1786–1803)
- Francis (1803–1806)

== Mediatized Counts of Königsegg-Aulendorf (1806–present) ==
- Francis, 7th Count 1803-1863 (1787–1863)
  - Gustav, 8th Count 1863-1882 (1813–1882)
  - Alfred, 9th Count 1882-1898 (1817–1898)
    - Xaver, 10th Count 1898-1927 (1858–1927)
      - Joseph Erwin, 11th Count 1927-1951 (1891–1951)
        - Johannes, 12th Count 1951–2020 (1925–2020)
          - Maximilian, 13th Count 2020-present (b. 1958)
            - Count Philipp, Hereditary Count of Königsegg-Aulendorf (b. 1988)
            - Count Nikolaus (b. 1990)
          - Count Markus (b. 1963)
            - Count Constantin (b. 1993)
            - Count Géza (b. 1998)
