= Königsegg =

State in Germany, 1192 to 1806

Coordinates: 47°57′15″N 9°38′20″E

Lordship (Barony) of Königsegg Herrschaft (Freiherrschaft) Königsegg
- 1192–1622
- Coat of arms
- Status: Lordship
- Capital: Aulendorf
- Historical era: Middle Ages; Early modern period
  - Lordship: 1192
  - Raised to barony: 1470
  - Partitioned to create Aulendorf and Rothenfels: 1622
  - Raised to imperial estate: 1629
  - Inherited by Aulendorf: 1663
  - Rothenfels sold to Austria: 1804 1622
  - Mediatised to Württemberg: 1806
Preceded by	Succeeded by
Duchy of Swabia	Kingdom of Württemberg

Königsegg was a state in the southeastern part of what is now Baden-Württemberg, Germany. It emerged in 1192 as a lordship and was raised to a barony in 1470. In 1622 it was subdivided into Königsegg-Aulendorf and Königsegg-Rothenfels.

In 1629, Königsegg was raised to an imperial estate and became a member of the College of the Counts of Swabia at the Reichstag. With the extinction of its male line in 1663, it was inherited by Königsegg-Aulendorf.

In 1804, Königsegg sold Rothenfels to Austria. In 1806, the Rheinbundakte mediatised Königsegg to the Kingdom of Württemberg. Today, the Counts of Königsegg still reside at Königseggwald Castle in Swabia and at Halbturn Castle in Austria.

== Geography ==
Königsegg was named after Königsegg Castle, which was located in Königsegg, today part of Guggenhausen. As of 1806, it consisted of two isolated parts, one around Königsegg and one around Aulendorf.

The state had no cities; its capital was Aulendorf. It was bordered by the County of Scheer, the Mainau Commandry of the Teutonic Order, the Abbacy of Weingarten, the Principality of Fürstenberg, the Abbacy of Schussenried, the County of Waldburg and Austria.

In 1806, Königsegg had an area of about 160 km^{2} (62 sq mi) and a population of about 3000.

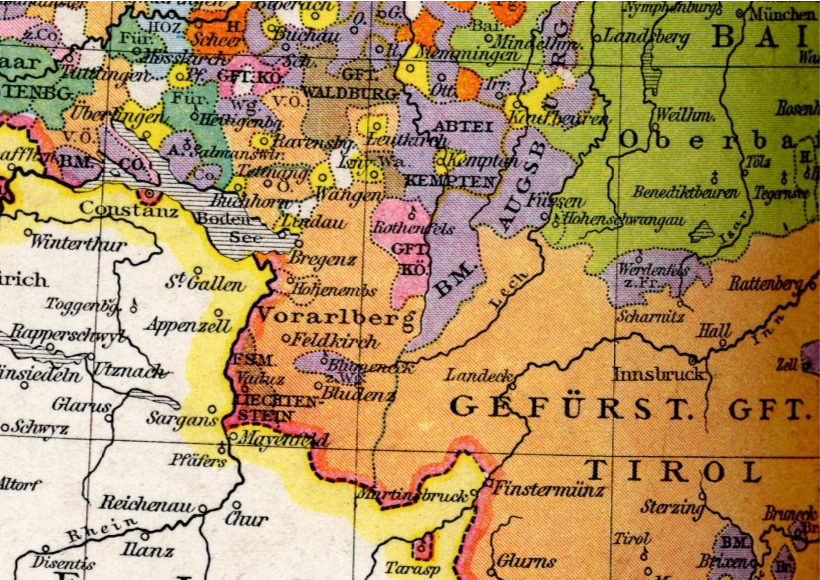
Location of Königsegg (GFT.KÖ., centre of image, with exclave to north-west, in pink) from Droysens Allgemeiner Historischer Handatlas, 1886

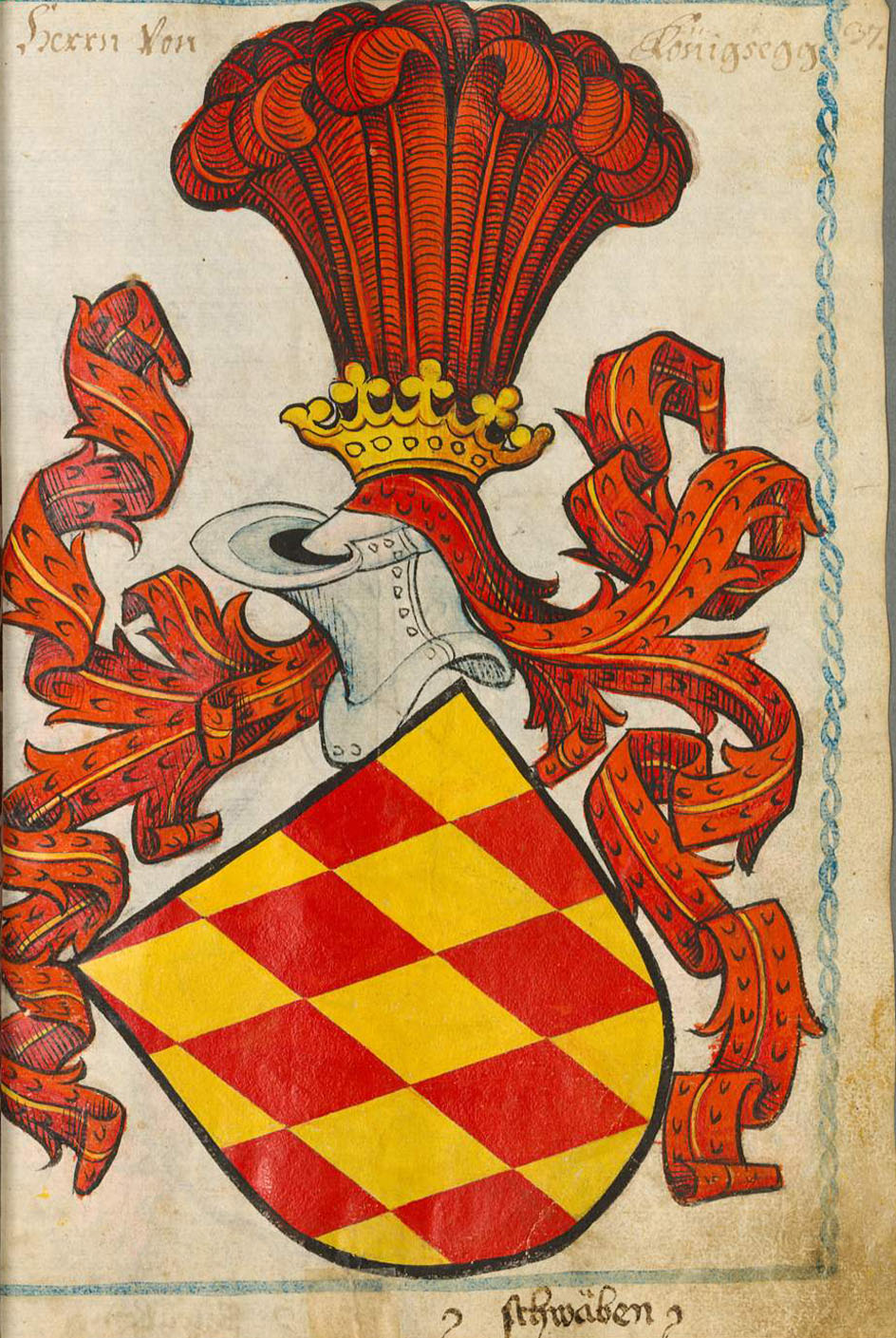
Coat of arms of Königsegg, Scheibler Wappenbuch, 1450–80

== Lords of Königsegg (1192–1470) ==
- Berthold I of Fronhofen (1192–1209)
- Eberhard I (1209–1228)
- Unknown
- Eberhard II (1239–1268) with...
  - Berthold II (1239–1251)
- Eberhard III (? – 1296)
- Ulrich I (? – 1300)
- John I (1300 – ?)
- Ulrich II (? – 1375) with...
  - Henry with...
  - Berthold III (? – 1370) with...
  - Ulrich III
- Ulrich IV (? – 1444)
- John II
- John III
- Marquard (? – 1470)

== Barons of Königsegg (1470–1663) ==
- Marquard (1470–1500)
- John IV (1500–1544)
- John Marquard (1544–1553) with...
  - John James (1544–1567)
- Marquard IV (1567–1626) with...
  - George II (1567–1622)
- John William (1626–1663)

== Gallery ==
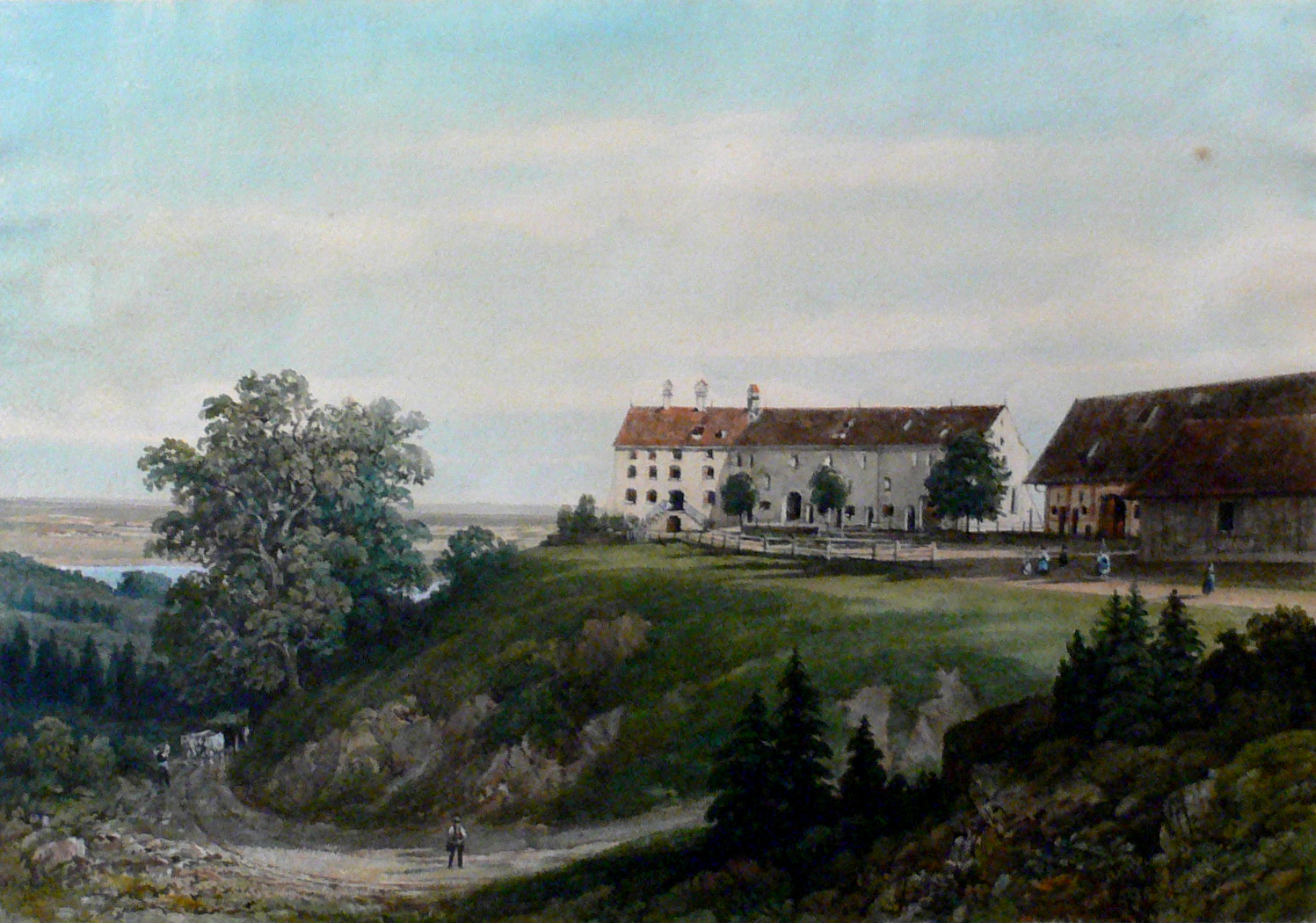
Königsegg Castle near Guggenhausen

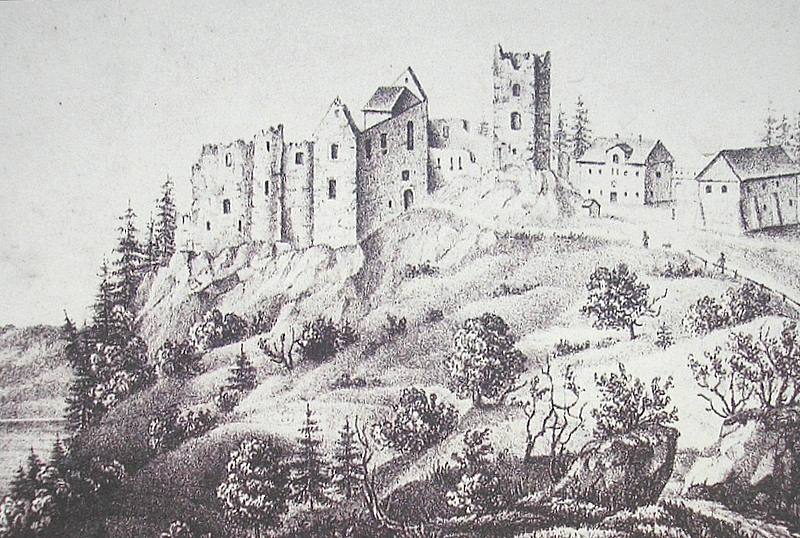
Rothenfels Castle near Immenstadt

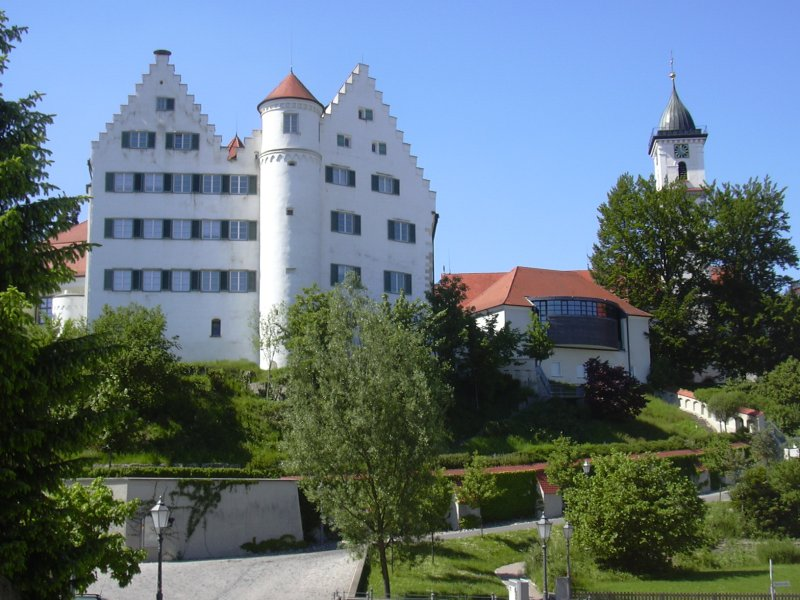
Aulendorf Castle

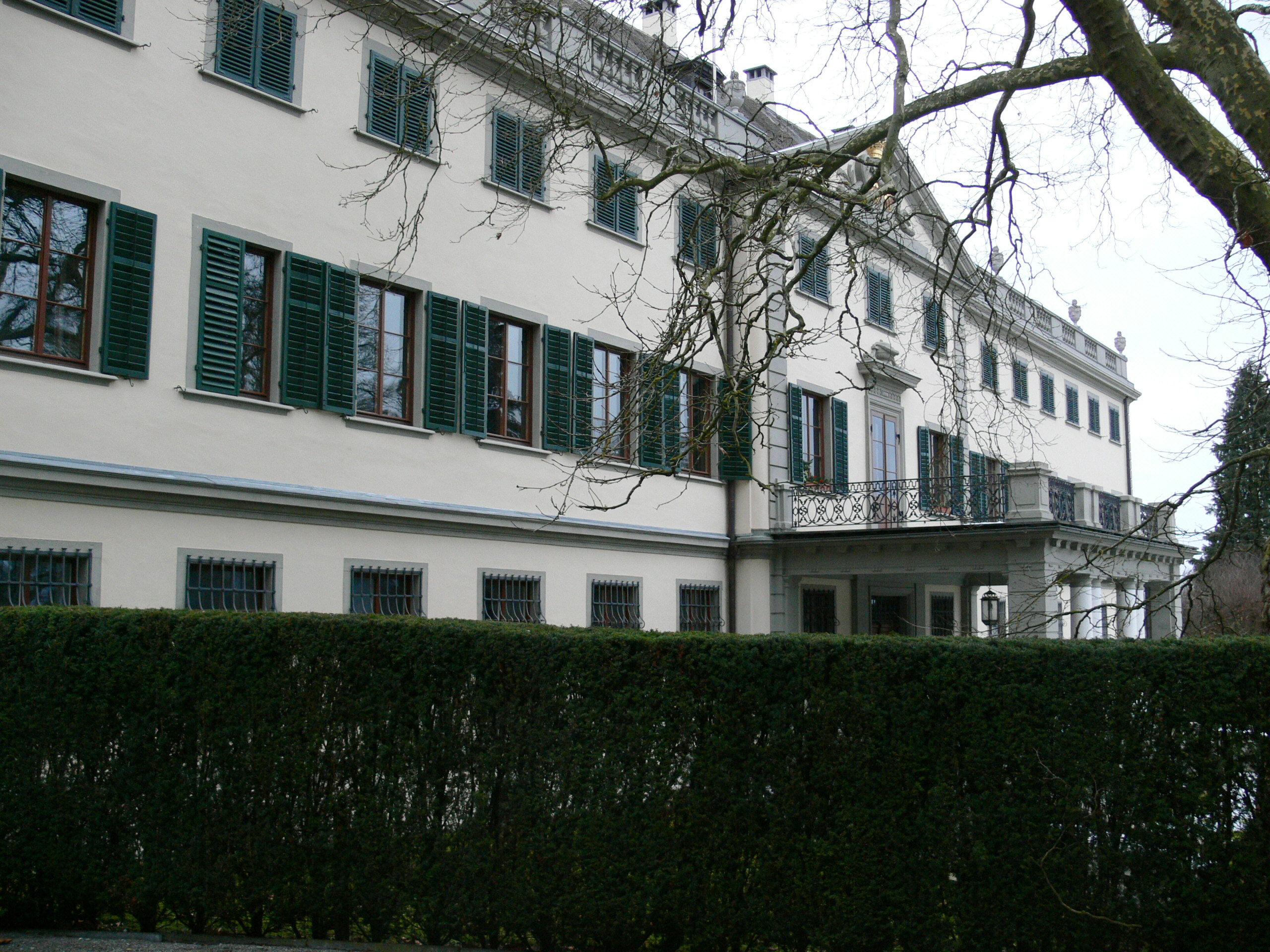
Königseggwald Castle

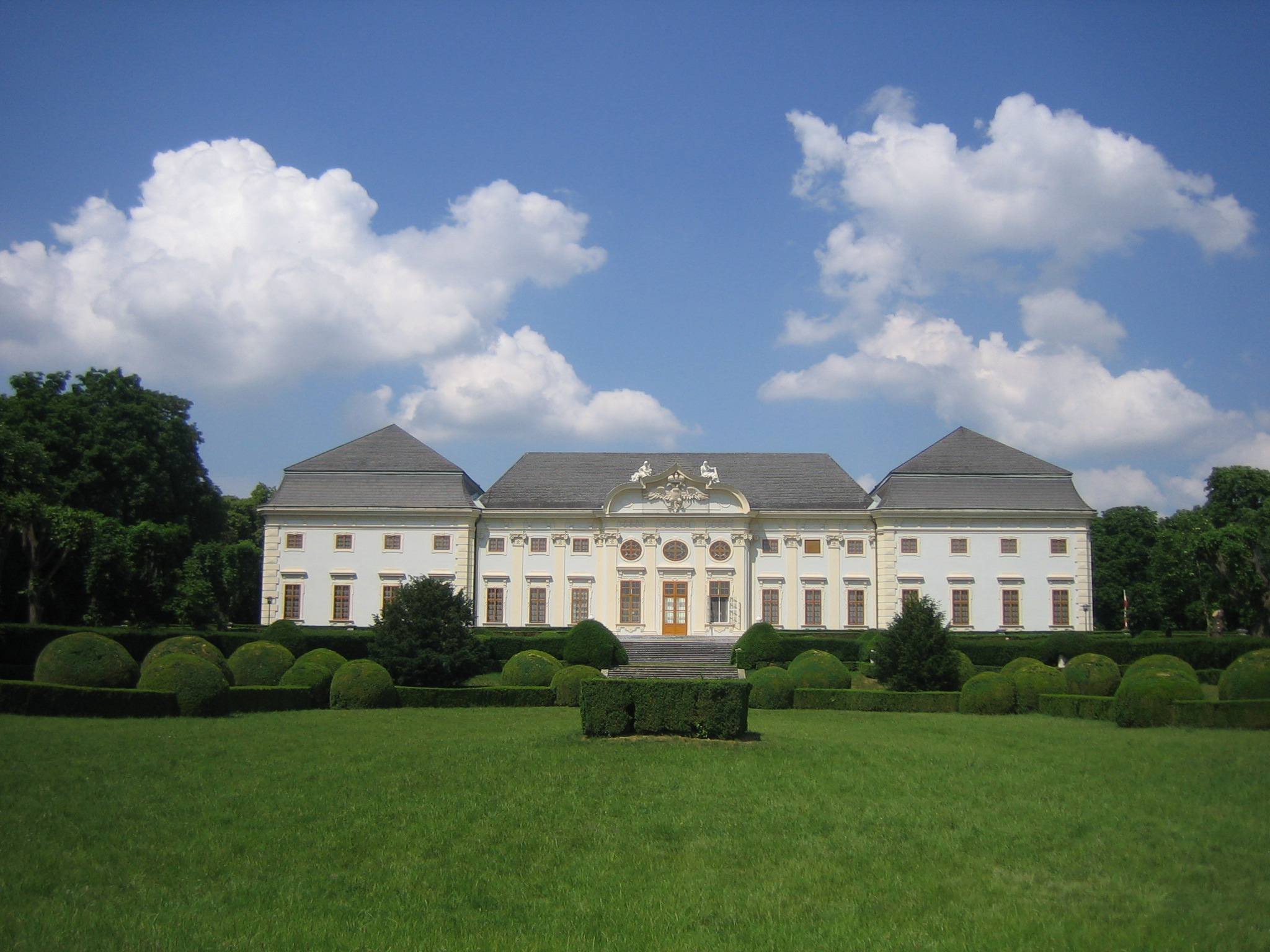
Halbturn Castle, Austria
