= Altshausen (Gemeindeverwaltungsverband) =

- Gemeindeverwaltungsverband
- Location of Altshausen within Ravensburg district
- Interactive map of Altshausen
- Location within Germany Location within Baden-Württemberg
- Coordinates: 47°56′N 9°33′E
- Country: Germany
- State: Baden-Württemberg
- Admin. region: Tübingen
- District: Ravensburg
- Seat: Altshausen
- Subdivisions: 11 municipalities

Area
  - Total: 130.52 km^{2} (50.39 sq mi)

Population (2025-12-31)
  - Total: 11,715
  - Density: 89.756/km^{2} (232.47/sq mi)
- Time zone: UTC+01:00 (CET)
  - Summer (DST): UTC+02:00 (CEST)
- Website: www.gvv-altshausen.de

Altshausen is a Gemeindeverwaltungsverband in the district of Ravensburg in Baden-Württemberg, Germany. The seat of the Gemeindeverwaltungsverband is in Altshausen.

The Gemeindeverwaltungsverband Altshausen consists of the following municipalities:

1. Altshausen
2. Boms
3. Ebenweiler
4. Ebersbach-Musbach
5. Eichstegen
6. Fleischwangen
7. Guggenhausen
8. Hoßkirch
9. Königseggwald
10. Riedhausen
11. Unterwaldhausen
