= Anna Bertha Königsegg =

German nun and resistance fighter (1883-1948)

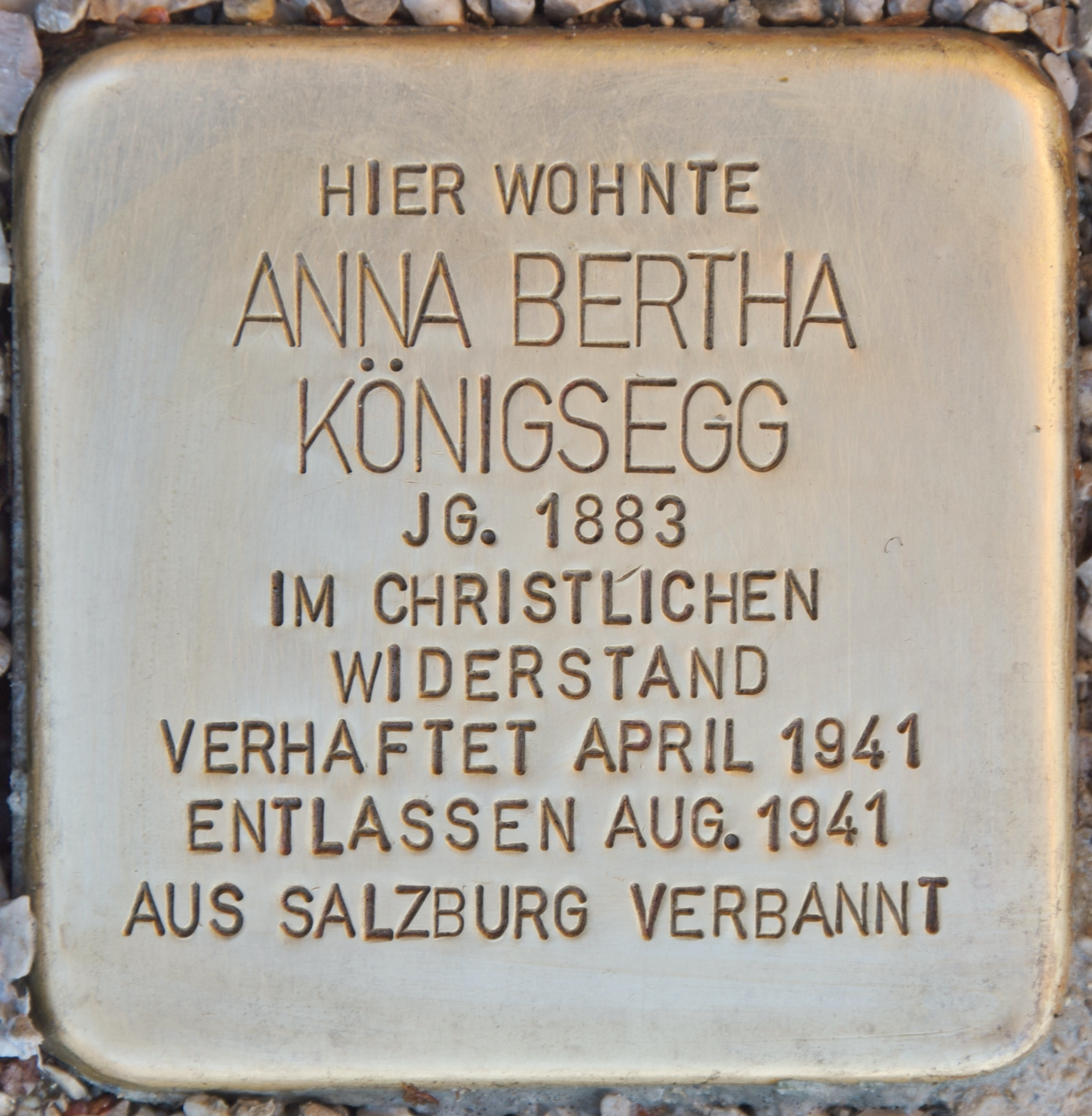
- Stumbling stone of Anna Bertha Königsegg
- Born: Anna Bertha Gräfin zu Königsegg-Aulendorf; 9 May 1883; Königseggwald, Württemberg, Germany
- Died: 12 December 1948 (aged 65); Salzburg, Austria
- Occupation(s): Nun, resistance fighter

Anna Bertha Königsegg (May 9, 1883 - December 12, 1948) was a German Catholic nun, nurse, and resistance fighter during the Nazi era. She is known for her courageous opposition to the Nazi euthanasia program.

== Early life ==
Born Anna Bertha Gräfin zu Königsegg-Aulendorf in Königseggwald, Württemberg, Königsegg came from an aristocratic family. She received a comprehensive education and was fluent in English, French, and Italian. At 18, she joined the Sisters of Mercy of Saint Vincent de Paul (Vincentian Sisters) in Paris.

== Career ==
After training as a nurse, Königsegg took the religious name Sister Marcellina in 1906. She worked in various leadership roles within the order, including directing a nursing school in Turin. In 1925, she was appointed Visitator (provincial superior) of the Salzburg province of her order.

== Resistance activities ==
Following the Anschluss of Austria in 1938, Königsegg came into conflict with the Nazi regime. She forbade the sisters under her authority from participating in forced sterilizations, rejecting the concept of "racial hygiene".

In August 1940, when the Schernberg Castle care facility run by her order was notified that patients would be transferred, Königsegg understood this meant they would be killed under the Nazi euthanasia program. She wrote protest letters to Gauleiter Friedrich Rainer and instructed her sisters not to assist in the deportation of patients.

== Arrest and exile ==
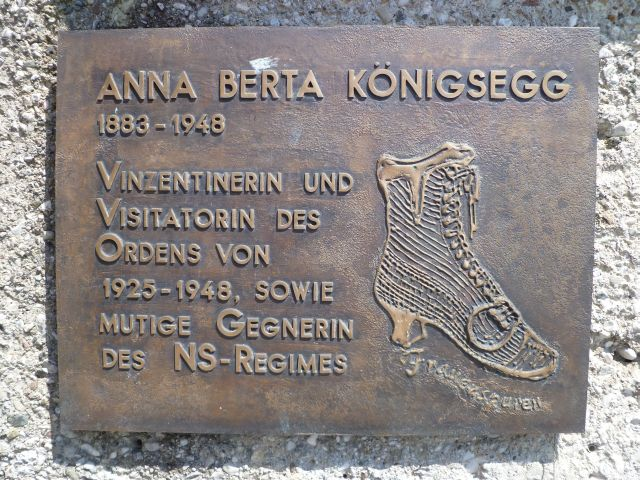
Memorial plaque for Anna Bertha Königsegg at Salzachgässchen 3 in Salzburg

Despite her efforts, 115 patients from Schernberg were deported to Hartheim euthanasia center on 21 April 1941, where they were murdered. Königsegg was arrested by the Gestapo on 16 April 1941, and held for four months. Upon release, she was exiled from the Salzburg region and placed under house arrest at her family's estate in Königseggwald.

== Legacy ==
Her stance against the Nazi regime has been recognized in various ways:

- A special school for severely disabled children in Salzburg bears her name.
- A street in the Gnigl district of Salzburg is named after her.
- In 2018, a Stolperstein (stumbling stone) memorial was placed in Salzburg to honor her memory.

== See also ==
- Resistance during World War II
