= Franz Weiß (politician) =

German politician

Member of the Bundestag; for Balingen
- In office 7 September 1949 – 6 October 1953
- Preceded by: Constituency established
- Succeeded by: Gebhard Müller

Minister for Agriculture and Food of Württemberg-Hohenzollern
- In office 10 December 1946 – 25 April 1952
- Minister-President: Carlo Schmid; Lorenz Bock; Gebhard Müller
- Preceded by: Office established
- Succeeded by: Office abolished

Personal details
- Born: 23 December 1887 Ried, Germany
- Died: 2 October 1974 (aged 86) Weingarten, West Germany
- Party: Christian Democratic Union
- Education: MLU Halle-Wittenberg; University of Hohenheim; University of Giessen

Franz Weiß (23 December 1887 – 2 October 1974) was a German politician of the Christian Democratic Union (CDU) and former member of the German Bundestag.

== Political career ==
Weiß was a member of the German Bundestag during its first legislative period from 1949 to 1953. He represented the Balingen constituency in parliament.

== Literature ==
Herbst, Ludolf; Jahn, Bruno (2002). Vierhaus, Rudolf (ed.). Biographisches Handbuch der Mitglieder des Deutschen Bundestages. 1949–2002 [Biographical Handbook of the Members of the German Bundestag. 1949–2002] (in German). München: De Gruyter - De Gruyter Saur. p. 1715. ISBN 978-3-11-184511-1.
