= Gerhard Stäbler =

German composer (born 1949)

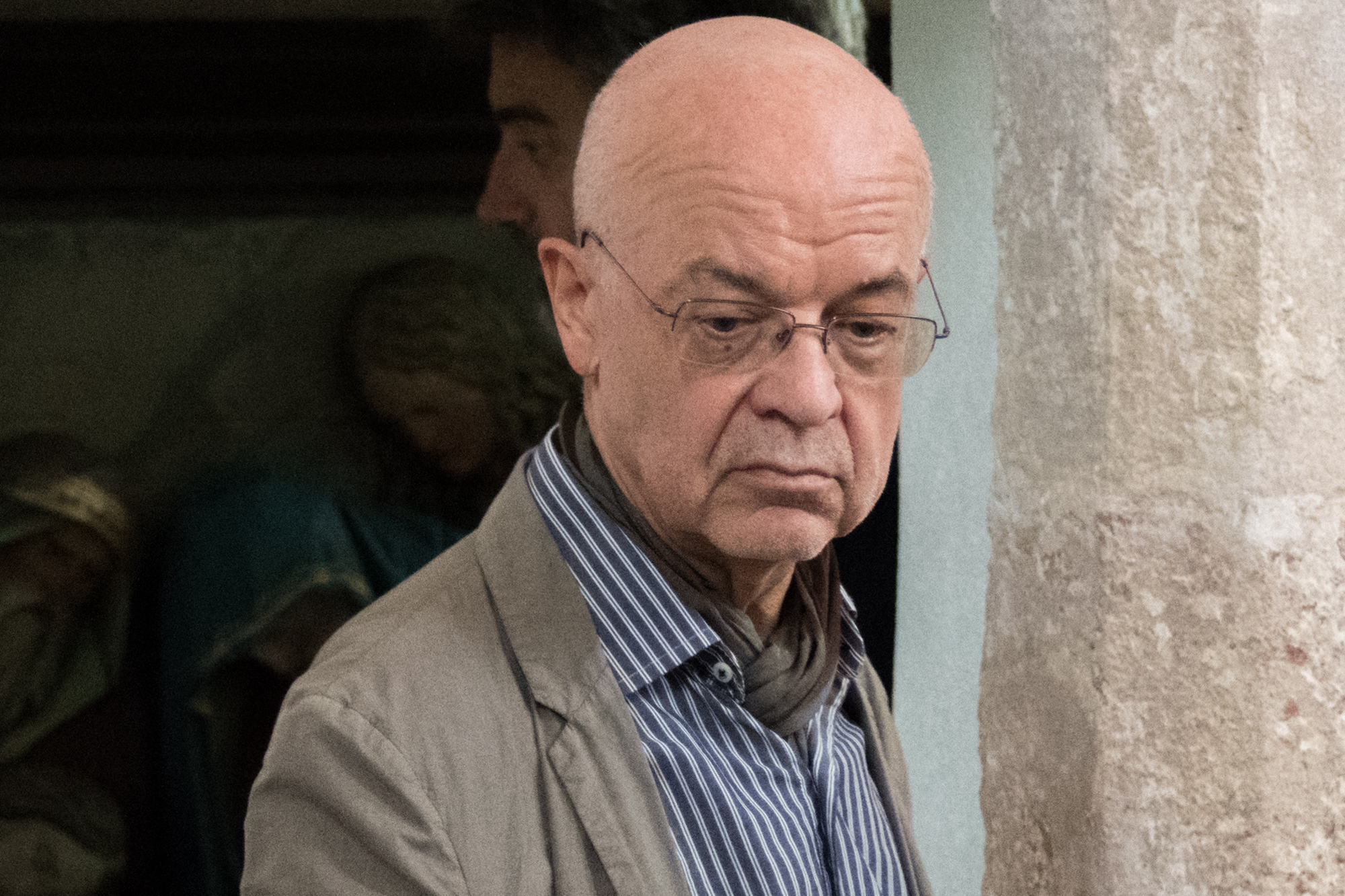
Gerhard Stäbler (2019)

Gerhard Stäbler (born 1949) is a German composer born in Wilhelmsdorf near Ravensburg. He studied with Klaus Huber and came to prominence with the chamber orchestra "acronym" Den Müllfahrern von San Francisco (The Garbage Truck Drivers of San Francisco) in 1990. This was followed by lectures at the Darmstädter Ferienkurse in 1992. He has resided extensively abroad, including Stanford University in the 1980s and Yonsei University in Seoul in 1988 and has visited Israel and Lebanon repeatedly, writing a chamber cantata Den Toten von Sabra und Chatila to poems by the Palestinian poet Tawfiq Ziad (1982). In Germany he has concentrated his activities around the Ruhr Area.
