= Schlier =

- Municipality
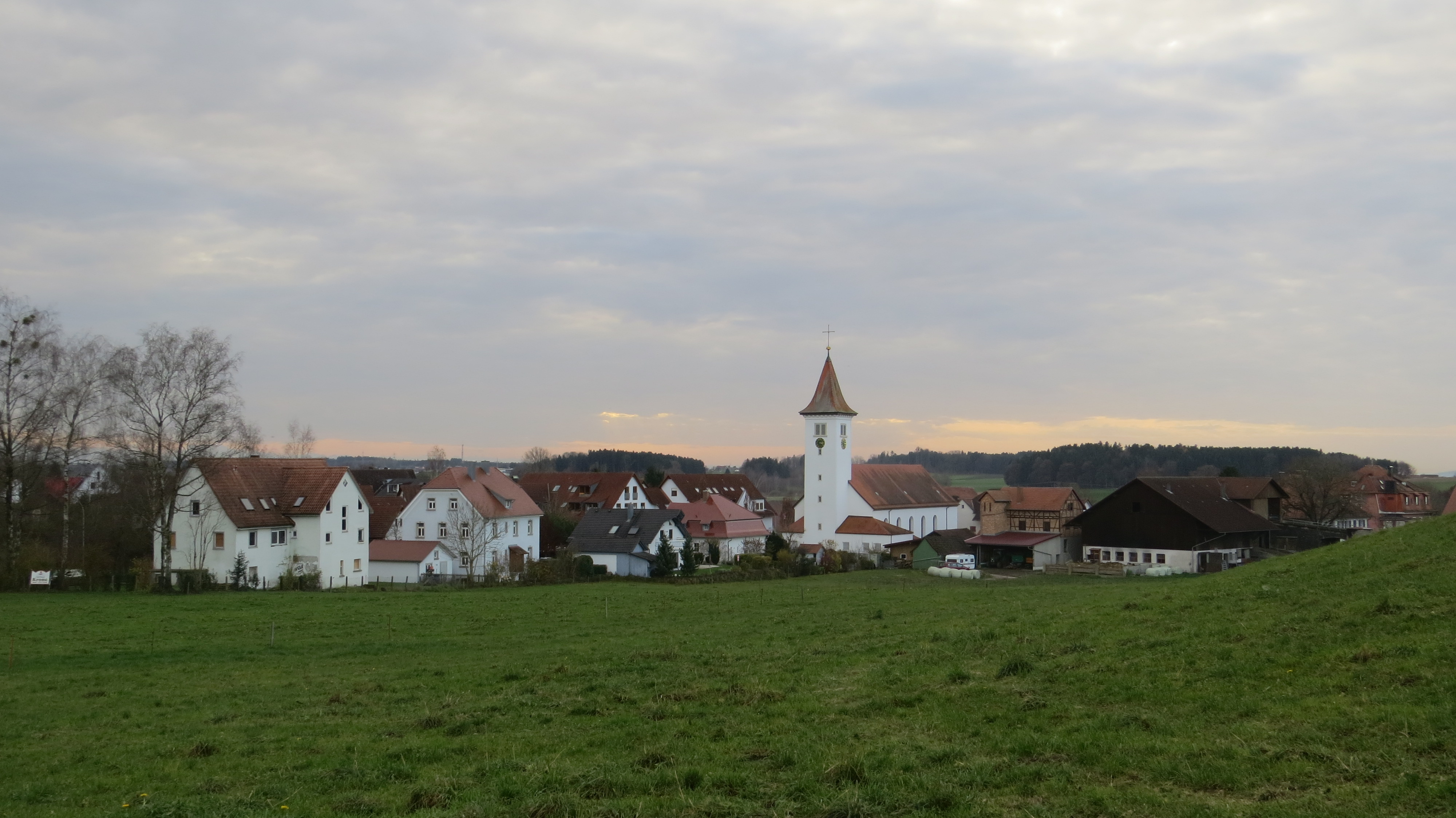
- Schlier (village) seen from northeast

- Coat of arms

- Location of Schlier within Ravensburg district
- Interactive map of Schlier
- Location within Germany Location within Baden-Württemberg
- Coordinates: 47°46′11″N 09°40′27″E
- Country: Germany
- State: Baden-Württemberg
- Admin. region: Tübingen
- District: Ravensburg
- Municipal assoc.: Gullen

Government
  - Mayor (2016–24): Katja Liebmann

Area
  - Total: 32.58 km^{2} (12.58 sq mi)
- Elevation: 596 m (1,955 ft)

Population (2025-12-31)
  - Total: 4,049
  - Density: 124.3/km^{2} (321.9/sq mi)
- Time zone: UTC+01:00 (CET)
  - Summer (DST): UTC+02:00 (CEST)
- Postal codes: 88281
- Dialling codes: 07529
- Vehicle registration: RV
- Website: www.schlier.de

Schlier is a municipality in the district of Ravensburg in the federal state of Baden-Württemberg in Germany. The municipality of Schlier, which is predominantly agricultural and covers an area of 32.58 km², has more than 4,000 inhabitants.

== Location ==
The municipality of Schlier is located in the south of the German federal state of Baden-Württemberg in the region of Upper Swabia, approximately 30 km from Lake Constance and 30 km from the Austrian border, and about 50 km from the Swiss border. Schlier lies on the southern edge of the Altdorf Forest area, above and to the east of the Schussen Valley, just a few kilometers east of the cities of Ravensburg and Weingarten.

== Municipal Structure ==
The municipality of Schlier consists of the main localities Schlier and Unterankenreute, as well as over 30 villages, hamlets, and isolated farms. The largest among them are the villages of Erbisreute, Fenken, Hintermoos, Oberankenreute, and Wetzisreute.

== History ==
=== Early history ===
In the year 861, a document from the Abbey of St. Gall first mentions the hamlet of Kehrenberg, which belonged to that monastery and is now part of present-day Schlier. During the High Middle Ages, the area was part of the Duchy of Swabia. By the mid-13th century, a significant portion of what is now the municipality of Schlier belonged to the Abbey of Weingarten through donations and purchases.

=== Peasants’ War ===
In 1525, rebellious peasants who became known as the Seehaufen or Allgäuer Haufen camped in Schlier during the German Peasants' War. Georg, Truchsess von Waldburg, better known as Bauernjörg, concluded the Treaty of Weingarten with them, thereby avoiding an open battle. However, the de facto surrender of the peasants gave him the opportunity to brutally suppress other uprisings in the region, such as in Böblingen.

=== Thirty Years’ War ===
During the Thirty Years’ War, the area around Schlier was not only plundered by the Swedes but also devastated by several plague epidemics and famines. A 1637 inventory by the Abbey of Weingarten listed only 130 surviving inhabitants by name — about 80% of the previous population had disappeared. To repopulate the farms, farmers from Switzerland, Tyrol, and Vorarlberg were recruited. Their family names still reflect their origins today. These new settlers proved to be prolific: from 1690 onwards, many residents of Schlier emigrated as Danube Swabians, mainly to Hungary and the Banatregion.

=== Napoleonic and Modern Era ===
Between 1791 and 1800, the area experienced looting by French and Russian troops. The "Russian Cemetery" in the forest along the road from Weingarten to Unterankenreute still testifies to the many Cossack and Tatar soldiers who died in the Weingarten field hospital.

In 1806, the region was annexed by Emperor Napoleon to the (Protestant) Kingdom of Württemberg — an unpopular decision in the predominantly Catholic Upper Swabia region. World War I claimed 61 lives from Schlier among the conscripted soldiers, and World War II claimed 90.

After World War II, the village became part of the French occupation zone and was subsequently assigned to the newly founded state of Württemberg-Hohenzollern, which was merged into the state of Baden-Württemberg in 1952.

== Population Development ==
Between 1961 and 1976, the population of the municipality increased from 1,595 to 2,922 due to active construction efforts — an increase of 1,327 residents, or 83.2%. Population growth before and after this period was comparable to that of surrounding communities.
