= Fronreute =

- Municipality
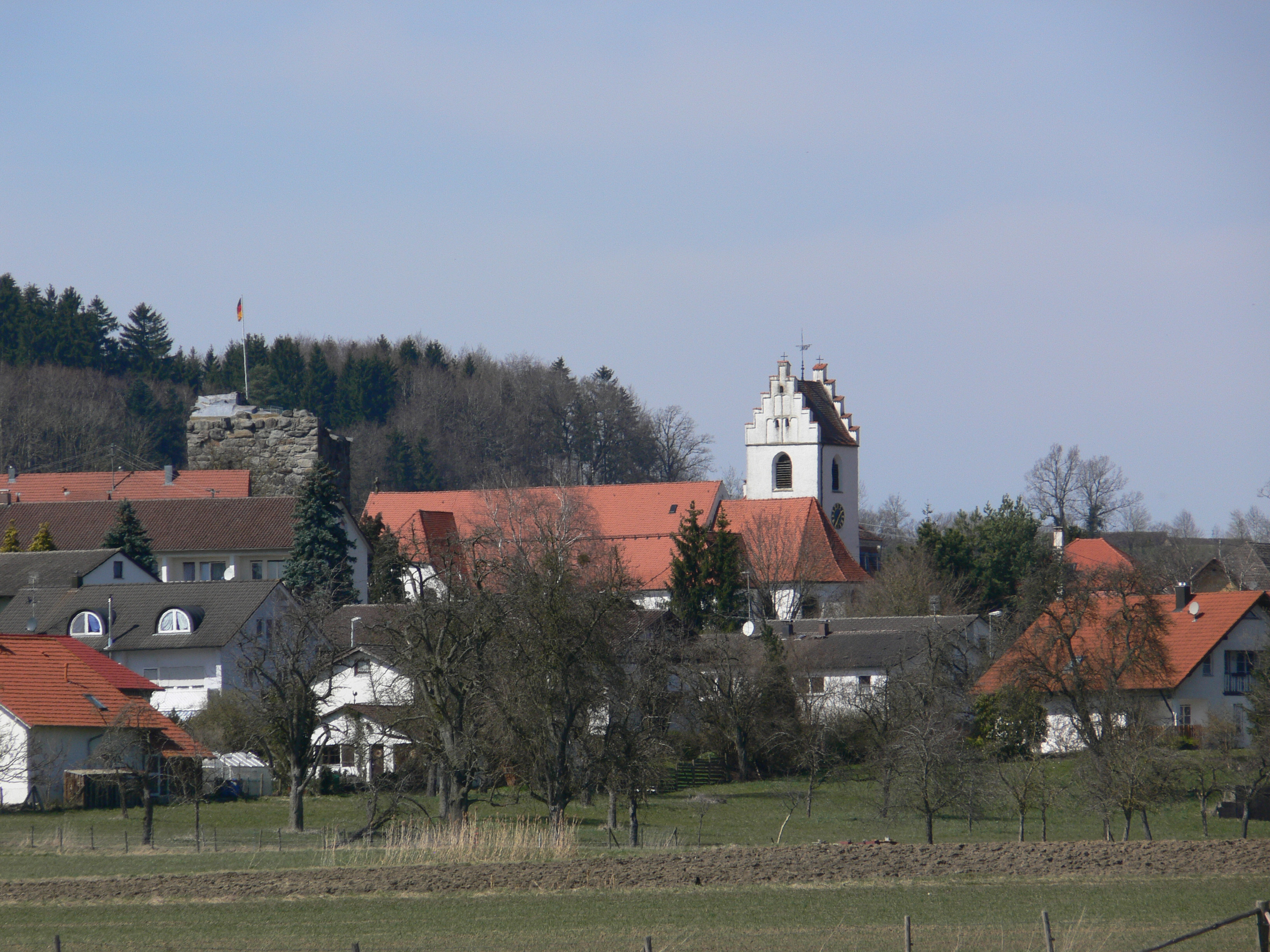
- Fronhofen with the tower ruins and the Church of Saints Conrad and Vincent

- Coat of arms

- Location of Fronreute within Ravensburg district
- Interactive map of Fronreute
- Location within Germany Location within Baden-Württemberg
- Coordinates: 47°51′32″N 09°31′13″E
- Country: Germany
- State: Baden-Württemberg
- Admin. region: Tübingen
- District: Ravensburg
- Municipal assoc.: Fronreute-Wolpertswende

Government
  - Mayor (2018–26): Oliver Spieß

Area
  - Total: 48.08 km^{2} (18.56 sq mi)
- Elevation: 594 m (1,949 ft)

Population (2025-12-31)
  - Total: 4,954
  - Density: 103.0/km^{2} (266.9/sq mi)
- Time zone: UTC+01:00 (CET)
  - Summer (DST): UTC+02:00 (CEST)
- Postal codes: 88273
- Dialling codes: 07502
- Vehicle registration: RV
- Website: www.fronreute.de

Fronreute is a town in the district of Ravensburg in Baden-Württemberg in Germany.
