= Bodnegg =

- Municipality
- Coat of arms

- Location of Bodnegg within Ravensburg district
- Interactive map of Bodnegg
- Location within Germany Location within Baden-Württemberg
- Coordinates: 47°42′36″N 09°41′22″E
- Country: Germany
- State: Baden-Württemberg
- Admin. region: Tübingen
- District: Ravensburg
- Municipal assoc.: Gullen

Government
  - Mayor (2022–30): Patrick Söndgen

Area
  - Total: 24.56 km^{2} (9.48 sq mi)
- Elevation: 620 m (2,030 ft)

Population (2025-12-31)
  - Total: 3,242
  - Density: 132.0/km^{2} (341.9/sq mi)
- Time zone: UTC+01:00 (CET)
  - Summer (DST): UTC+02:00 (CEST)
- Postal codes: 88285
- Dialling codes: 07520
- Vehicle registration: RV
- Website: www.bodnegg.de

Bodnegg is a municipality in the district of Ravensburg in Baden-Württemberg in Germany.
