= Robin Mesarosch =

German politician

Robin Mesarosch (born 1 April 1991) is a German politician of the Social Democratic Party (SPD) who served as a member of the Bundestag from 2021 to 2025.

== Early life and career ==
Mesarosch was born 1991 in the town of Herrenberg.

== Political career ==
Mesarosch became a member of the Bundestag in the 2021 elections, representing the Zollernalb – Sigmaringen district. In parliament, he served on the Committee on Digital Affairs and the Committee on Climate Action and Energy.

Within his parliamentary group, Mesarosch belonged to the Parliamentary Left, a left-wing movement.

== Other activities ==
- German Industry Initiative for Energy Efficiency (DENEFF), Member of the Parliamentary Advisory Board
- German United Services Trade Union (ver.di), Member
