= Grünkraut =

- Municipality
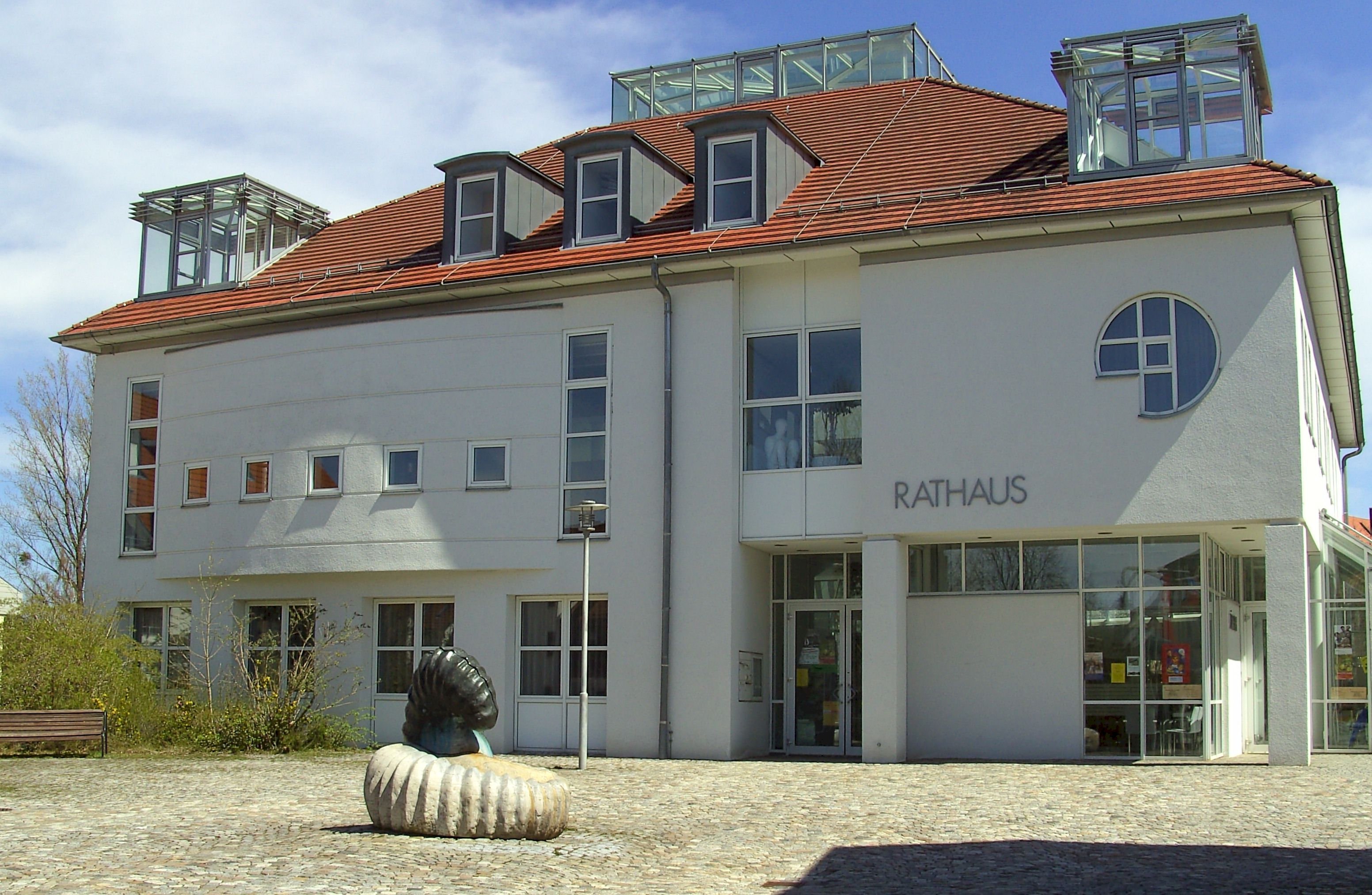
- Town hall

- Coat of arms

- Location of Grünkraut within Ravensburg district
- Interactive map of Grünkraut
- Location within Germany Location within Baden-Württemberg
- Coordinates: 47°44′35″N 09°39′14″E
- Country: Germany
- State: Baden-Württemberg
- Admin. region: Tübingen
- District: Ravensburg
- Municipal assoc.: Gullen

Government
  - Mayor (2018–26): Holger Lehr

Area
  - Total: 17.16 km^{2} (6.63 sq mi)
- Elevation: 601 m (1,972 ft)

Population (2025-12-31)
  - Total: 3,078
  - Density: 179.4/km^{2} (464.6/sq mi)
- Time zone: UTC+01:00 (CET)
  - Summer (DST): UTC+02:00 (CEST)
- Postal codes: 88287
- Dialling codes: 0751
- Vehicle registration: RV
- Website: www.gruenkraut.de

Grünkraut is a town in the district of Ravensburg in Baden-Württemberg in Germany. Local historians suggest the name didn't just refer to a green landscape, but specifically to a unique mix of wild herbs found in the nearby Wasenmoos nature reserve.
