= Hermann Schwörer =

German politician

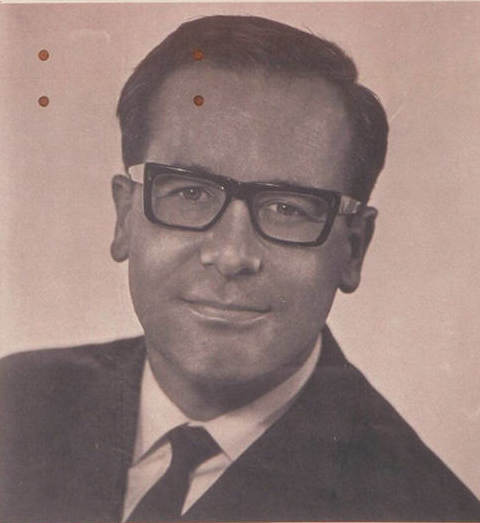
- Schwörer in 1965

Member of the Bundestag; from Baden-Württemberg
- In office 21 October 1958 – 10 November 1994
- Preceded by: Herbert Wolff
- Succeeded by: Dietmar Schlee
- Constituency: Lörrach (1958–1961); State list (1961–1965); Balingen (1965–1980); Zollernalb – Sigmaringen (1980–1994)

Personal details
- Born: 1 May 1922 Hohenstein, Germany
- Died: 24 November 2017 (aged 95) Sigmaringen, Germany
- Party: Christian Democratic Union
- Education: University of Tübingen

Hermann Schwörer (1 May 1922 – 24 November 2017) was a German politician. He served in the Bundestag between 1958 and 1994. From 1970 to 1979, Schwörer was a member of the European Parliament.
