= Königsegg-Rothenfels =

State in Bavaria, Germany, 1622 to 1804

Coordinates: 47°33′35″N 10°13′08″E

Barony (County) of Königsegg-Rothenfels Freiherrschaft (Grafschaft) Königsegg-Rothenfels
- 1622–1804
- Coat of arms
- Status: County
- Capital: Immenstadt
- Historical era: Early modern period
  - Partitioned from Königsegg: 1622
  - Raised to county: 1629
  - Mediatised to Austria: 1804
  - Transferred to Bavaria: 1805
Preceded by	Succeeded by
Königsegg / Königsegg	Austrian Empire

Königsegg-Rothenfels was a state in far southwestern Bavaria, Germany, located north of Austria and east of Baden-Württemberg. It was created as a partition of the Barony of Königsegg in 1622, and was raised to a county seven years later. It was sold to Austria in 1804, but was granted to Bavaria by France in 1805 at the Peace of Pressburg during the Napoleonic Wars.

== Baron of Königsegg-Rothenfels (1622–29) ==
- Hugh (1622–29)

== Counts of Königsegg-Rothenfels (1629–1804) ==
- Hugh (1629–66)
- Leopold William (1666–94)
- Sigmund William (1694–1709)
- Albert (1709–36), married Maria von Manderscheid-Blankenheim
  - Maximilian Friedrich, Archbishop-Elector of Cologne
- Charles Ferdinand (1736–59)
- Francis Hugh (1759–71)
- Francis Fidelis Anthony (1771–1804)

== Other family members ==
- Karl Ferdinand, Graf von Königsegg-Rothenfels, married to Hélène de Boisschot, Baroness of Saventhem
- Dominik von Königsegg-Rothenfels
- Christian Moritz Graf Königsegg und Rothenfels
