= Karl Ferdinand von Königsegg-Erps =

Count Karl Ferdinand von Königsegg-Erps (November 1, 1696 – December 20, 1759) was an administrator and diplomat in Habsburg service.

== Biography ==
Königsegg-Erps was born in Vienna, the firstborn son of Imperial Chamberlain Count Albert zu Königsegg-Rothenfels and Countess Maria von Manderscheid-Blankenheim. He was raised for the clergy and became a canon in Strasbourg, but resigned this office in 1718 to become Imperial Chamberlain. In 1720 he married Countess Hélène van Erps-Boisschot, granddaughter of Ferdinand de Boisschot, after which he took the name Königsegg-Erps. From this marriage came two daughters and a son, of which only the eldest daughter survived her father.

Count Karl Ferdinand was the elder brother of Maximilian Friedrich von Königsegg-Rothenfels, Elector and Archbishop of Cologne. His uncle, Count Dominik von Königsegg-Rothenfels, then Imperial Ambassador to Paris, brought him into the diplomacy as his secretary. From 1725 to 1728 he was Extraordinary Envoy in The Hague, afterwards he was appointed to Paris and Madrid, after which he was summoned to Brussels in the early 1730s.

From 1740 he was a Geheim Rat counselor and vice-chairman of the Supreme Court of the Austrian Netherlands. In 1742 he became Obersthofmeister at the court of governor Maria Anna of Austria and finally, as Minister Plenipotentiary, the highest administrator of the Austrian Netherlands between 1743 and 1744.

After the death of Archduchess Maria Anna, he returned to Vienna to become Obersthofmeister at the court of Empress Dowager Elisabeth Christine. In 1748 he became chairman of an institution responsible for munitions and mining, a council responsible for the administration of the Banat and the Illyrian areas and then chairman of the Hofkammer.

In 1744 he was admitted to the Order of the Golden Fleece.

During his lifetime, Königsegg-Erps was highly respected. Contemporaries describe him as a diligent civil servant.

== Sources ==
- ADB
- the article in the German Wikipedia, Karl Ferdinand von Königsegg.
