= Fleischwangen =

- Municipality
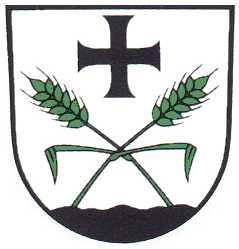
- Coat of arms

- Location of Fleischwangen within Ravensburg district
- Interactive map of Fleischwangen
- Location within Germany Location within Baden-Württemberg
- Coordinates: 47°52′42″N 09°28′51″E
- Country: Germany
- State: Baden-Württemberg
- Admin. region: Tübingen
- District: Ravensburg
- Municipal assoc.: Altshausen

Government
  - Mayor (2022–30): Timo Egger

Area
  - Total: 5.80 km^{2} (2.24 sq mi)
- Elevation: 628 m (2,060 ft)

Population (2025-12-31)
  - Total: 671
  - Density: 116/km^{2} (300/sq mi)
- Time zone: UTC+01:00 (CET)
  - Summer (DST): UTC+02:00 (CEST)
- Postal codes: 88373
- Dialling codes: 07505
- Vehicle registration: RV
- Website: www.fleischwangen.de

Fleischwangen is a municipality in the district of Ravensburg in Baden-Württemberg in Germany.
