= Ebenweiler =

- Municipality
- Coat of arms

- Location of Ebenweiler within Ravensburg district
- Interactive map of Ebenweiler
- Location within Germany Location within Baden-Württemberg
- Coordinates: 47°54′03″N 09°30′48″E
- Country: Germany
- State: Baden-Württemberg
- Admin. region: Tübingen
- District: Ravensburg
- Municipal assoc.: Altshausen

Government
  - Mayor (2016–24): Tobias Brändle

Area
  - Total: 10.13 km^{2} (3.91 sq mi)
- Elevation: 592 m (1,942 ft)

Population (2025-12-31)
  - Total: 1,387
  - Density: 136.9/km^{2} (354.6/sq mi)
- Time zone: UTC+01:00 (CET)
  - Summer (DST): UTC+02:00 (CEST)
- Postal codes: 88370
- Dialling codes: 07584
- Vehicle registration: RV
- Website: www.ebenweiler.de

Ebenweiler is a village in the district of Ravensburg in Baden-Württemberg in Germany.

== Population development ==
- 1829: 348
- 1960: 576
- 1980: 708
- 1986: 822
- 2005: 1128
- 2018: 1213
