= Horgenzell =

- Municipality
- Coat of arms

- Location of Horgenzell within Ravensburg district
- Interactive map of Horgenzell
- Location within Germany Location within Baden-Württemberg
- Coordinates: 47°48′19″N 09°29′53″E
- Country: Germany
- State: Baden-Württemberg
- Admin. region: Tübingen
- District: Ravensburg

Government
  - Mayor (2020–28): Volker Restle

Area
  - Total: 56.16 km^{2} (21.68 sq mi)
- Elevation: 620 m (2,030 ft)

Population (2025-12-31)
  - Total: 5,462
  - Density: 97.26/km^{2} (251.9/sq mi)
- Time zone: UTC+01:00 (CET)
  - Summer (DST): UTC+02:00 (CEST)
- Postal codes: 88263
- Dialling codes: 07504
- Vehicle registration: RV
- Website: www.horgenzell.de

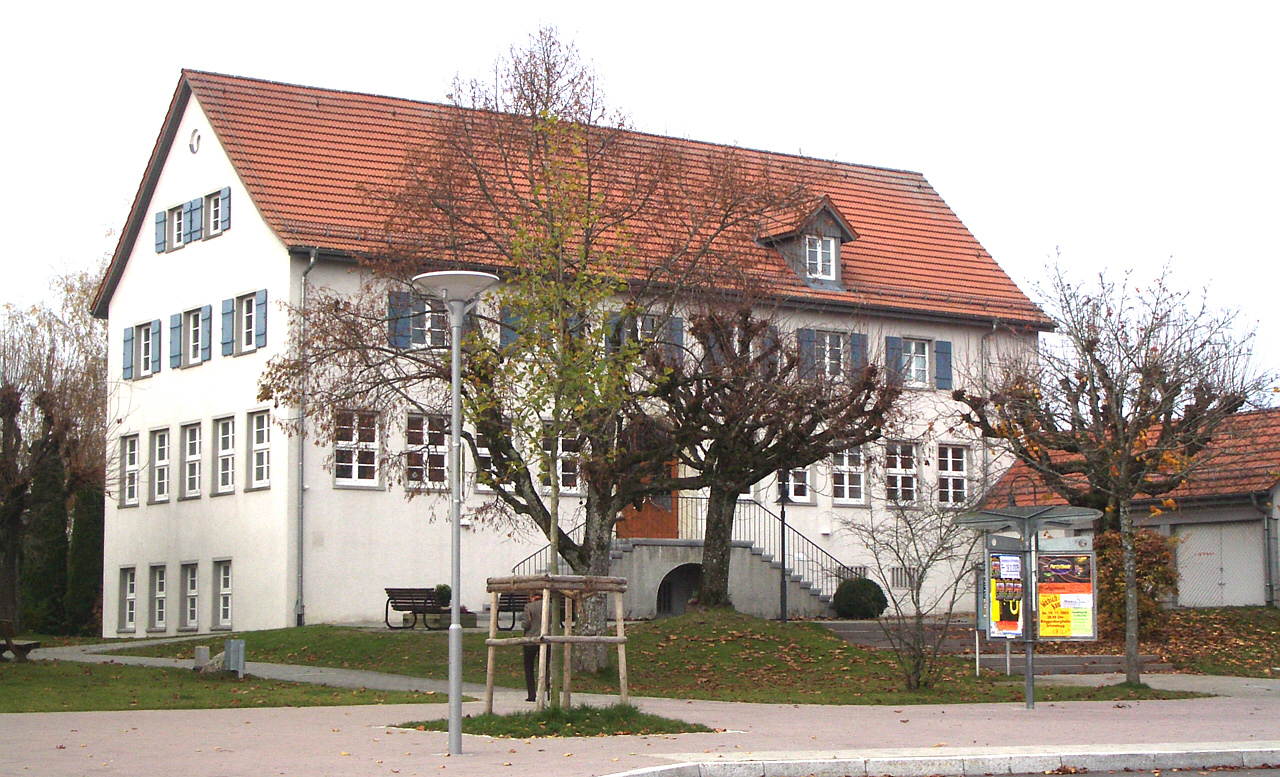
Horgenzell townhall in 2005

Horgenzell is a municipality in Germany with 4528 inhabitants, near Ravensburg. Horgenzell was first named in 1094. In 1972 the villages Hasenweiler, Kappel, Wolketsweiler and Zogenweiler were added to Horgenzell. In 1974 the village of Tepfenhart was added to Horgenzell

At Horgenzell, there is the Ravensburg-Horgenzell transmitter, a facility for mediumwave broadcasting.

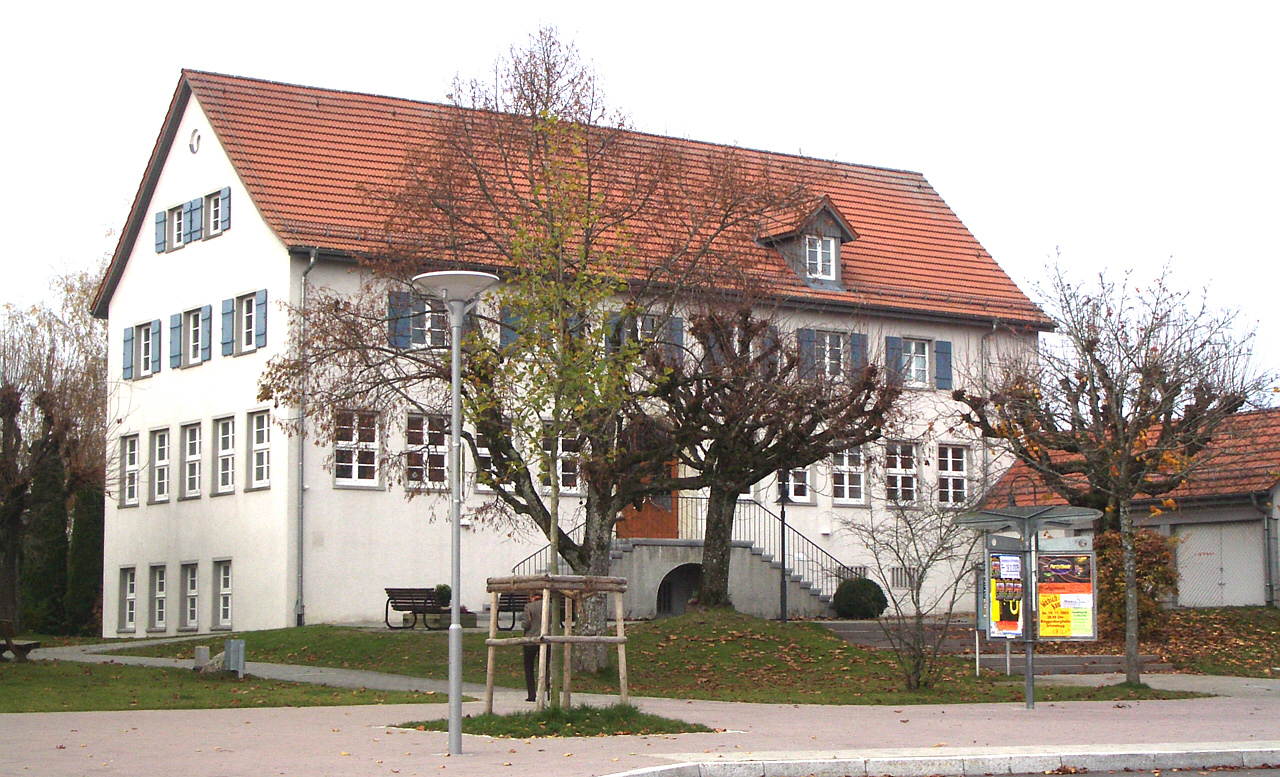
Town hall

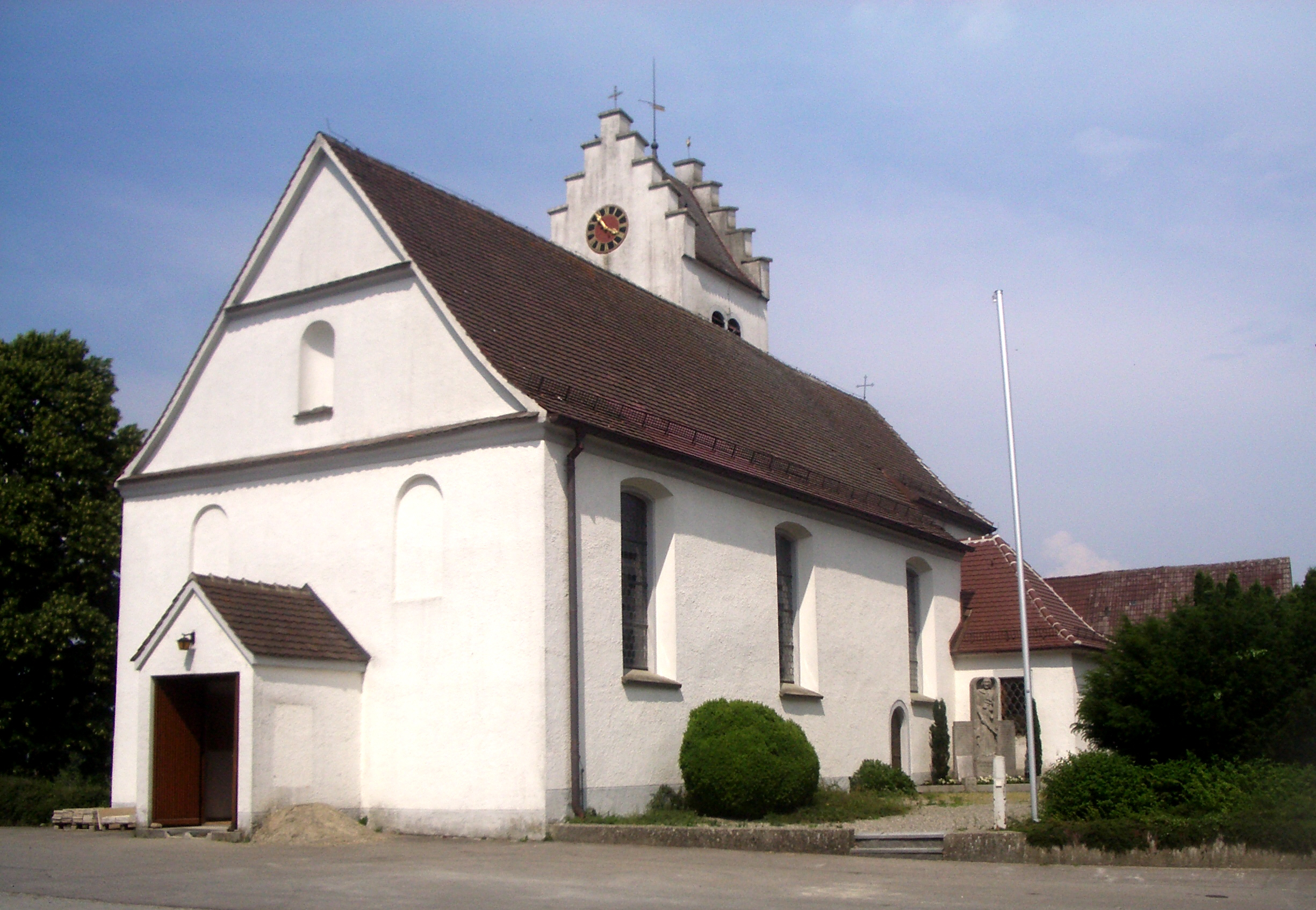
Saint Ursula's church

== Trivia ==
- The hamlets of Danketsweiler and Hasenweiler, which belong to the municipality, are mentioned in the lyrics of the Schwobarock song Ratzariader Schenkelbatscher by Grachmusikoff.

== Bibliography ==
- Municipality of Horgenzell (Ed.): 25 Jahre Gemeinde Horgenzell. Geschichte und Gegenwart einer jungen Gemeinde (25 Years of Horgenzell Municipality. History and Present of a Young Community). Horgenzell 1997.
- Johann Daniel Georg von Memminger: Gemeinde Hassenweiler – Gemeinde Kappel – Gemeinde Zogenweiler. In: Beschreibung des Oberamts Ravensburg. Cotta, Stuttgart and Tübingen 1836.
