= Unterwaldhausen =

- Municipality
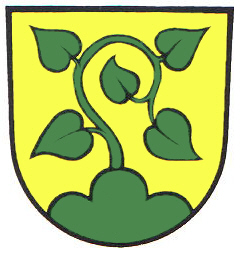
- Coat of arms

- Location of Unterwaldhausen within Ravensburg district
- Interactive map of Unterwaldhausen
- Location within Germany Location within Baden-Württemberg
- Coordinates: 47°54′07″N 09°28′14″E
- Country: Germany
- State: Baden-Württemberg
- Admin. region: Tübingen
- District: Ravensburg
- Municipal assoc.: Altshausen

Government
  - Mayor (2016–24): Josef Schill

Area
  - Total: 4.11 km^{2} (1.59 sq mi)
- Elevation: 649 m (2,129 ft)

Population (2025-12-31)
  - Total: 273
  - Density: 66.4/km^{2} (172/sq mi)
- Time zone: UTC+01:00 (CET)
  - Summer (DST): UTC+02:00 (CEST)
- Postal codes: 88379
- Dialling codes: 07587
- Vehicle registration: RV
- Website: www.gvv-altshausen.de

Unterwaldhausen is a town in the district of Ravensburg in Baden-Württemberg in Germany.
