= Riedhausen =

- Municipality
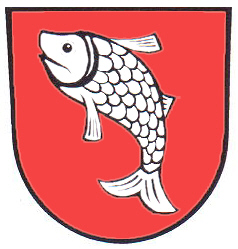
- Coat of arms

- Location of Riedhausen within Ravensburg district
- Interactive map of Riedhausen
- Location within Germany Location within Baden-Württemberg
- Coordinates: 47°54′36″N 09°25′46″E
- Country: Germany
- State: Baden-Württemberg
- Admin. region: Tübingen
- District: Ravensburg
- Municipal assoc.: Altshausen

Government
  - Mayor (2021–29): Yvonne Heine

Area
  - Total: 8.42 km^{2} (3.25 sq mi)
- Elevation: 631 m (2,070 ft)

Population (2025-12-31)
  - Total: 811
  - Density: 96.3/km^{2} (249/sq mi)
- Time zone: UTC+01:00 (CET)
  - Summer (DST): UTC+02:00 (CEST)
- Postal codes: 88377
- Dialling codes: 07587
- Vehicle registration: RV
- Website: www.gvv-altshausen.de

Riedhausen is a municipality in the district of Ravensburg in Baden-Württemberg in Germany.
