= Atzenberger Höhe =

Mountain in Germany

- Location within Baden-Württemberg

Highest point
- Elevation: 706.5 m (2,318 ft)
- Coordinates: 47°58′N 09°37′E

Geography
- Location: Baden-Württemberg, Germany

Atzenberger Höhe is a mountain of Baden-Württemberg, Germany.
