= Aulendorf =

Place in Baden-Württemberg, Germany

- Town
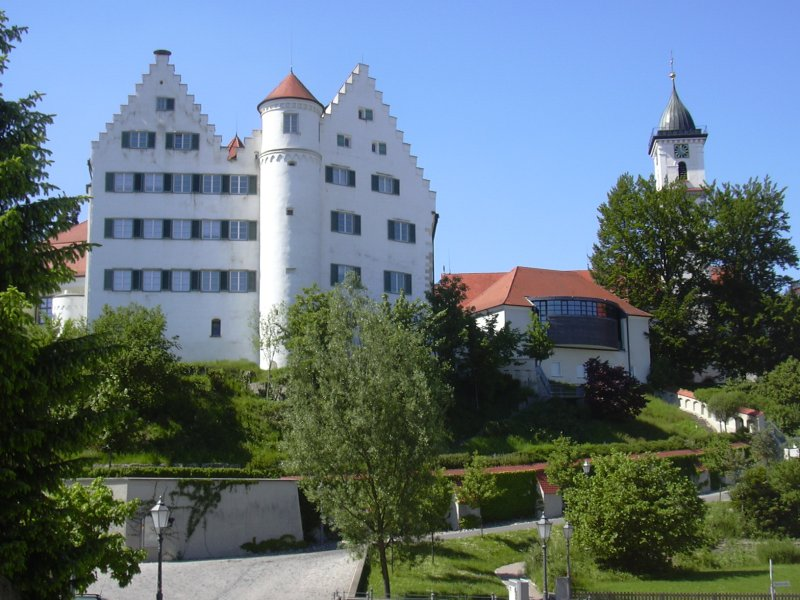
- Aulendorf Castle

- Coat of arms

- Location of Aulendorf within Ravensburg district
- Interactive map of Aulendorf
- Location within Germany Location within Baden-Württemberg
- Coordinates: 47°57′15″N 09°38′20″E
- Country: Germany
- State: Baden-Württemberg
- Admin. region: Tübingen
- District: Ravensburg

Government
  - Mayor (2016–24): Matthias Burth

Area
  - Total: 52.34 km^{2} (20.21 sq mi)
- Elevation: 576 m (1,890 ft)

Population (2025-12-31)
  - Total: 10,466
  - Density: 200.0/km^{2} (517.9/sq mi)
- Time zone: UTC+01:00 (CET)
  - Summer (DST): UTC+02:00 (CEST)
- Postal codes: 88326
- Dialling codes: 07525
- Vehicle registration: RV
- Website: www.aulendorf.de

Aulendorf (German pronunciation: [ˈaʊləndɔʁf]) is a town in the district of Ravensburg, in Baden-Württemberg, Germany. It is situated 20 kilometres (12 miles) southwest of Biberach an der Riß, and 19 kilometres (12 miles) north of Ravensburg.

Aulendorf exists of the town itself along with the incorporated villages Tannhausen, Bloenried and Zollenreute.

Aulendorf is well known in Upper Swabia for its catholic all-day high school "Studienkolleg St. Johann" founded by the Styler Missionaries. It was once the capital of the historic German statelet of Königsegg.

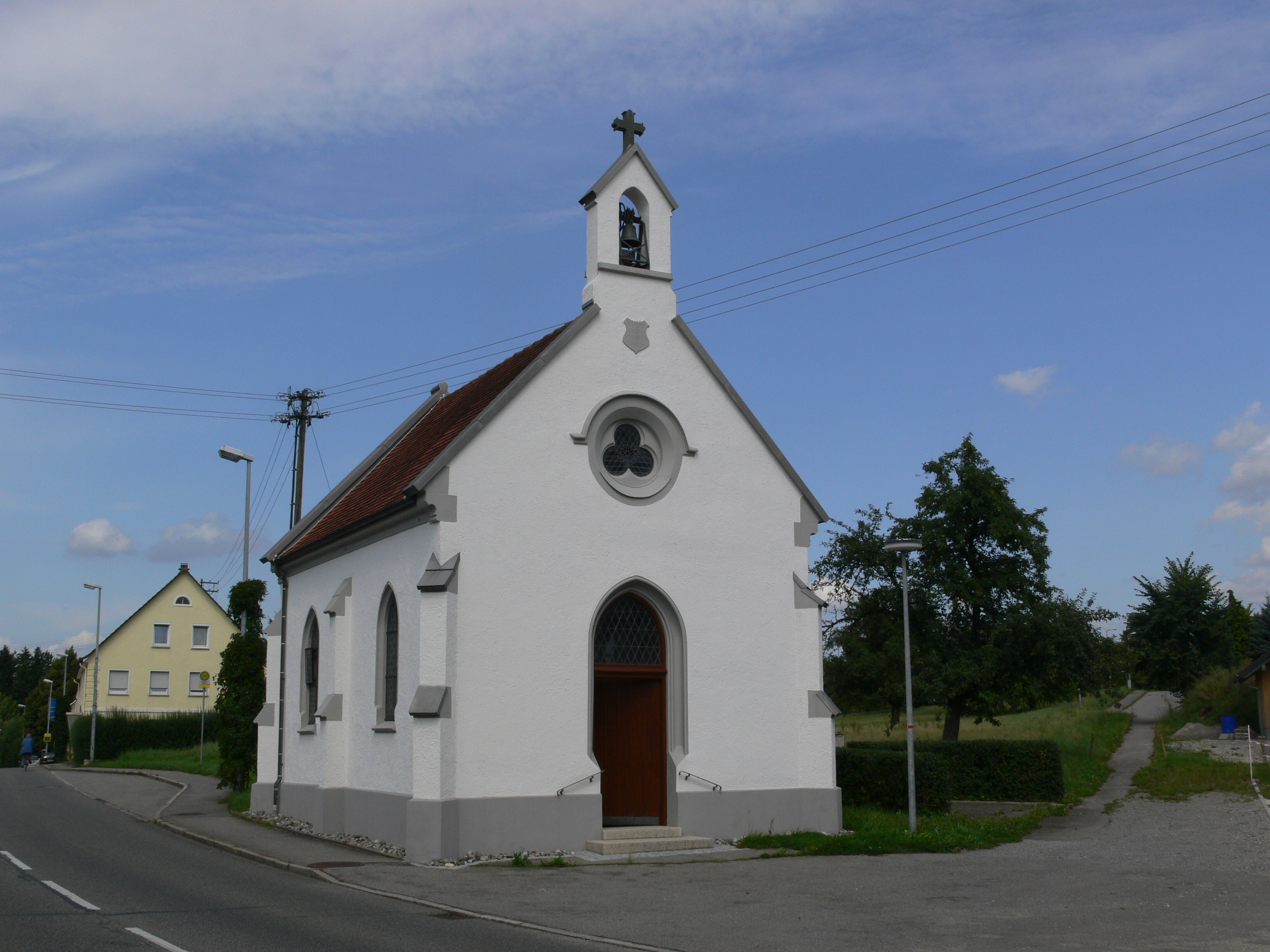
Saint George's chapel, Aulendorf-Zollenreute

== Transport ==
Aulendorf is a local train hub for three lines:

- Herbertingen–Aulendorf railway
- Allgäu railway
- Southern railway

== Culture and attractions ==
Aulendorf is located on the Upper Swabian Baroque Route and the Schwäbische Bäderstrasse.

=== Museums ===
- The adventure parcours Medialer Erlebnisparcours tells the history about the castle Schloss Aulendorf
- The museum Bürgermuseum presents the history of the town

=== Buildings ===
- The Catholic Church St. Martin contains exhibition pieces from all epochs from Gothic art to Classicism
- The castle Schloss Aulendorf united five epochs

== Notable people ==
- Hermann von Vicari (1773–1868), 1843–1868 archbishop of Freiburg.
- Franziska zu Königsegg-Aulendorf (1814–1871), noblewoman.
- Erwin Glonnegger (1925–2016), author and game designer, winner of the Order of Merit
- Gerhard Hennige (born 1940), sprinter, Olympic silver medalist 1968 Mexico

=== Twin towns — Sister cities ===
Aulendorf is twinned with:

- Conches-en-Ouche, France
