= Ravensburg (district) =

Coordinates: 47.82°N 9.8°E

- District
- Flag Coat of arms
- Country: Germany
- State: Baden-Württemberg
- Adm. region: Tübingen
- Capital: Ravensburg

Government
  - District admin.: Harald Sievers (CDU)

Area
  - Total: 1,631.72 km^{2} (630.01 sq mi)

Population (31 December 2025)
  - Total: 291,600
  - Density: 178.7/km^{2} (462.8/sq mi)
- Time zone: UTC+01:00 (CET)
  - Summer (DST): UTC+02:00 (CEST)
- Vehicle registration: RV, SLG, ÜB, WG
- Website: www.landkreis-ravensburg.de

Ravensburg is a Landkreis (district) in the southeast of Baden-Württemberg, Germany. Neighboring districts are (from southwest clockwise) Bodensee, Sigmaringen and Biberach, the Bavarian urban district Memmingen and the districts Unterallgäu, Oberallgäu and Lindau.

== History ==
The district dates back to the Oberamt Ravensburg, which was created in 1810 when the previously free imperial city Ravensburg and the surrounding area became part of Württemberg. In 1938 the Oberamt was converted into a district and most of the Oberamt Waldsee was merged into the new district. In 1973 the district Wangen was merged into the district, together with a few municipalities from the district Saulgau, Überlingen and Biberach. The district is also home to the toymaker Ravensburger.

== Geography ==
The landscape of the district consists of the Oberschwäbischen Hügelland and Westallgäuer Hügelland hils.

== Coat of arms ==
The coat of arms show a Lion, the symbol of the Welfen family. This family had their center in Ravensburg, before the area went to the Hohenstaufen family.

== Towns and municipalities ==
Clickable map of towns and municipalities in the district

Towns

1. Aulendorf
2. Bad Waldsee
3. Bad Wurzach
4. Isny im Allgäu
5. Leutkirch im Allgäu
6. Wangen im Allgäu

Municipalities

1. Achberg
2. Aichstetten
3. Aitrach
4. Amtzell
5. Argenbühl
6. Bergatreute
7. Horgenzell
8. Kißlegg
9. Vogt
10. Wilhelmsdorf
11. Wolfegg

Gemeindeverwaltungsverbände
1. Altshausen; 1. Altshausen^{1}; 2. Boms; 3. Ebenweiler; 4. Ebersbach-Musbach; 5. Eichstegen; 6. Fleischwangen; 7. Guggenhausen; 8. Hoßkirch; 9. Königseggwald; 10. Riedhausen; 11. Unterwaldhausen	2. Fronreute-Wolpertswende; 1. Fronreute; 2. Wolpertswende^{1}	3. Gullen; 1. Bodnegg; 2. Grünkraut^{1}; 3. Schlier; 4. Waldburg	4. Mittleres Schussental; 1. Baienfurt; 2. Baindt; 3. Berg; 4. Ravensburg^{1,2}; 5. Weingarten^{2}
^{1}seat of the Gemeindeverwaltungsverband; ^{2}town
