= Hoßkirch =

- Municipality
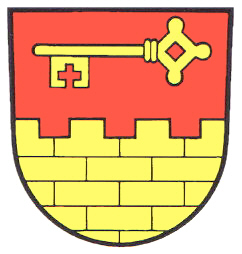
- Coat of arms

- Location of Hoßkirch within Ravensburg district
- Interactive map of Hoßkirch
- Location within Germany Location within Baden-Württemberg
- Coordinates: 47°56′27″N 09°26′37″E
- Country: Germany
- State: Baden-Württemberg
- Admin. region: Tübingen
- District: Ravensburg
- Municipal assoc.: Altshausen

Government
  - Mayor (2014–22): Roland Haug

Area
  - Total: 15.81 km^{2} (6.10 sq mi)
- Elevation: 635 m (2,083 ft)

Population (2025-12-31)
  - Total: 751
  - Density: 47.5/km^{2} (123/sq mi)
- Time zone: UTC+01:00 (CET)
  - Summer (DST): UTC+02:00 (CEST)
- Postal codes: 88374
- Dialling codes: 07587
- Vehicle registration: RV
- Website: www.gvv-altshausen.de

Hoßkirch is a town in the district of Ravensburg in Baden-Württemberg in Germany.
