= Boms =

- Municipality
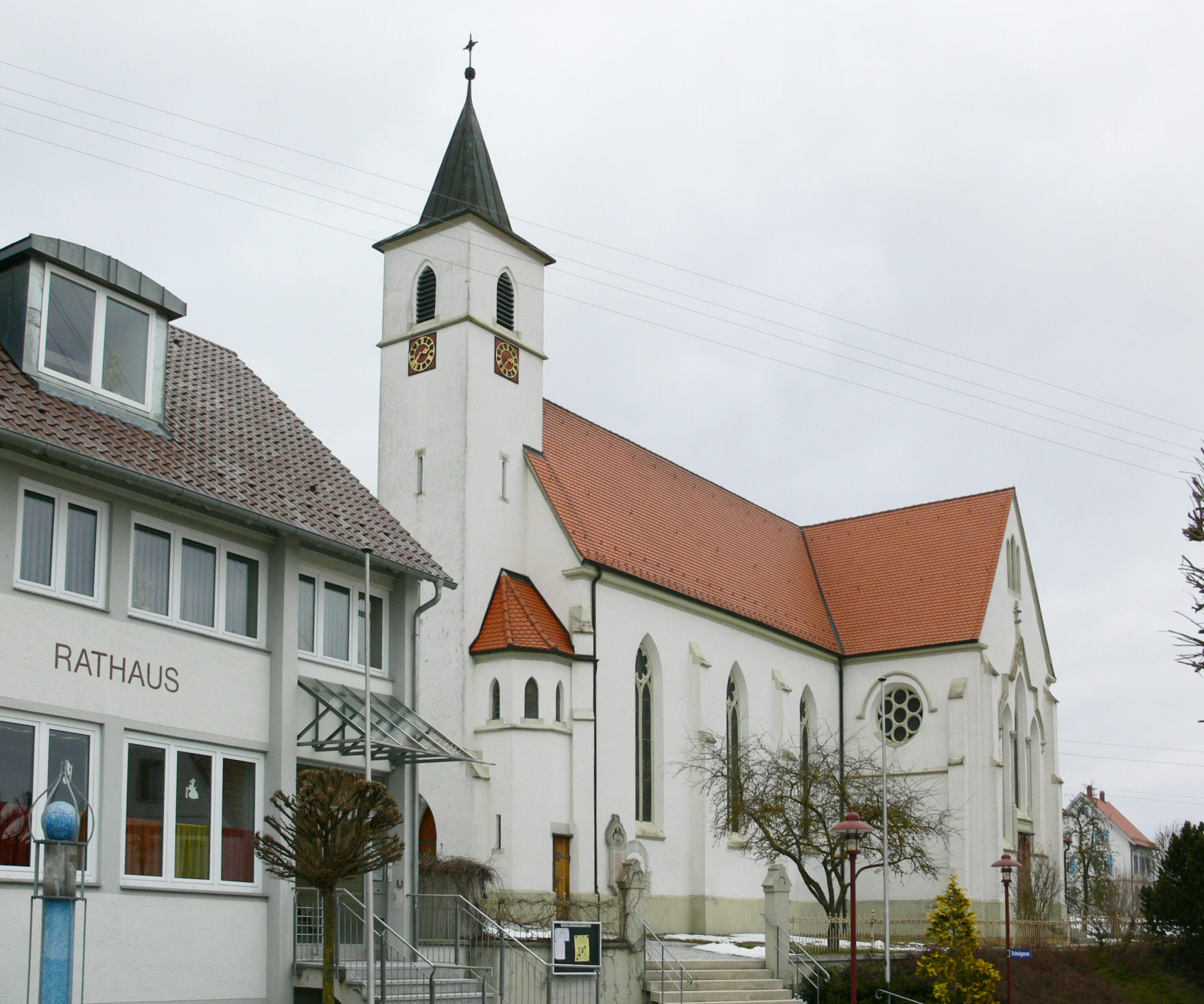
- Town hall and the Church of Our Lady

- Coat of arms

- Location of Boms within Ravensburg district
- Interactive map of Boms
- Location within Germany Location within Baden-Württemberg
- Coordinates: 47°58′09″N 09°30′34″E
- Country: Germany
- State: Baden-Württemberg
- Admin. region: Tübingen
- District: Ravensburg
- Municipal assoc.: Altshausen

Government
  - Mayor (2016–24): Peter Wetzel

Area
  - Total: 9.56 km^{2} (3.69 sq mi)
- Elevation: 638 m (2,093 ft)

Population (2025-12-31)
  - Total: 707
  - Density: 74.0/km^{2} (192/sq mi)
- Time zone: UTC+01:00 (CET)
  - Summer (DST): UTC+02:00 (CEST)
- Postal codes: 88361
- Dialling codes: 07581
- Vehicle registration: RV
- Website: www.boms.de

Boms is a municipality in the district of Ravensburg in Baden-Württemberg in Germany.

== Population development ==
- 1829: 370
- 1900: 458
- 1969: 466
- 2004: 577
- 2008: 655
- 2020: 706
