= Wilhelmsdorf, Baden-Württemberg =

Wilhelmsdorf
- Municipality
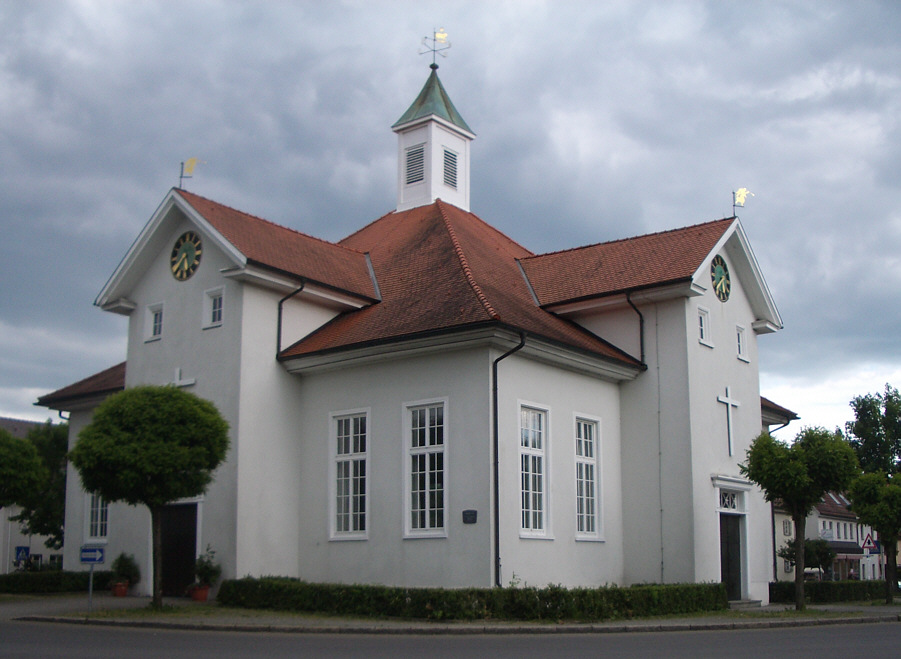
- Lutheran church

- Coat of arms

- Location of Wilhelmsdorf within Ravensburg district
- Interactive map of Wilhelmsdorf
- Location within Germany Location within Baden-Württemberg
- Coordinates: 47°51′54″N 09°25′39″E
- Country: Germany
- State: Baden-Württemberg
- Admin. region: Tübingen
- District: Ravensburg

Government
  - Mayor (2024–32): Sandra Flucht

Area
  - Total: 38.09 km^{2} (14.71 sq mi)
- Elevation: 616 m (2,021 ft)

Population (2025-12-31)
  - Total: 4,718
  - Density: 123.9/km^{2} (320.8/sq mi)
- Time zone: UTC+01:00 (CET)
  - Summer (DST): UTC+02:00 (CEST)
- Postal codes: 88271
- Dialling codes: 07503
- Vehicle registration: RV
- Website: www.gemeinde-wilhelmsdorf.de

Wilhelmsdorf (German pronunciation: [ˈvɪlhɛlmsˌdɔʁf]) is a municipality in the district of Ravensburg in Baden-Württemberg in Germany.

The place was founded in 1824 by Pietists, who wanted to emigrate overseas, but were granted by King William I of Württemberg a place, where they could settle among themselves. The place was named after the king and modelled after the settlement congregations of the Herrnhuter Bruedergemeine or Moravian Church.
