= Guggenhausen =

- Municipality
- Coat of arms

- Location of Guggenhausen within Ravensburg district
- Interactive map of Guggenhausen
- Location within Germany Location within Baden-Württemberg
- Coordinates: 47°53′37″N 09°27′20″E
- Country: Germany
- State: Baden-Württemberg
- Admin. region: Tübingen
- District: Ravensburg
- Municipal assoc.: Altshausen

Government
  - Mayor (2017–25): Jochen Currle

Area
  - Total: 8.25 km^{2} (3.19 sq mi)
- Elevation: 637 m (2,090 ft)

Population (2025-12-31)
  - Total: 193
  - Density: 23.4/km^{2} (60.6/sq mi)
- Time zone: UTC+01:00 (CET)
  - Summer (DST): UTC+02:00 (CEST)
- Postal codes: 88379
- Dialling codes: 07503
- Vehicle registration: RV
- Website: www.gvv-altshausen.de

Guggenhausen is a town in the district of Ravensburg in Baden-Württemberg in Germany.
