= Eichstegen =

- Municipality
- Coat of arms

- Location of Eichstegen within Ravensburg district
- Interactive map of Eichstegen
- Location within Germany Location within Baden-Württemberg
- Coordinates: 47°56′18″N 09°29′50″E
- Country: Germany
- State: Baden-Württemberg
- Admin. region: Tübingen
- District: Ravensburg
- Municipal assoc.: Altshausen

Government
  - Mayor (2020–28): Artur Rauch

Area
  - Total: 14.24 km^{2} (5.50 sq mi)
- Elevation: 600 m (2,000 ft)

Population (2025-12-31)
  - Total: 555
  - Density: 39.0/km^{2} (101/sq mi)
- Time zone: UTC+01:00 (CET)
  - Summer (DST): UTC+02:00 (CEST)
- Postal codes: 88361
- Dialling codes: 07584
- Vehicle registration: RV
- Website: www.eichstegen.de

Eichstegen is a town in the district of Ravensburg in Baden-Württemberg in Germany.
