= Altshausen =

- Municipality
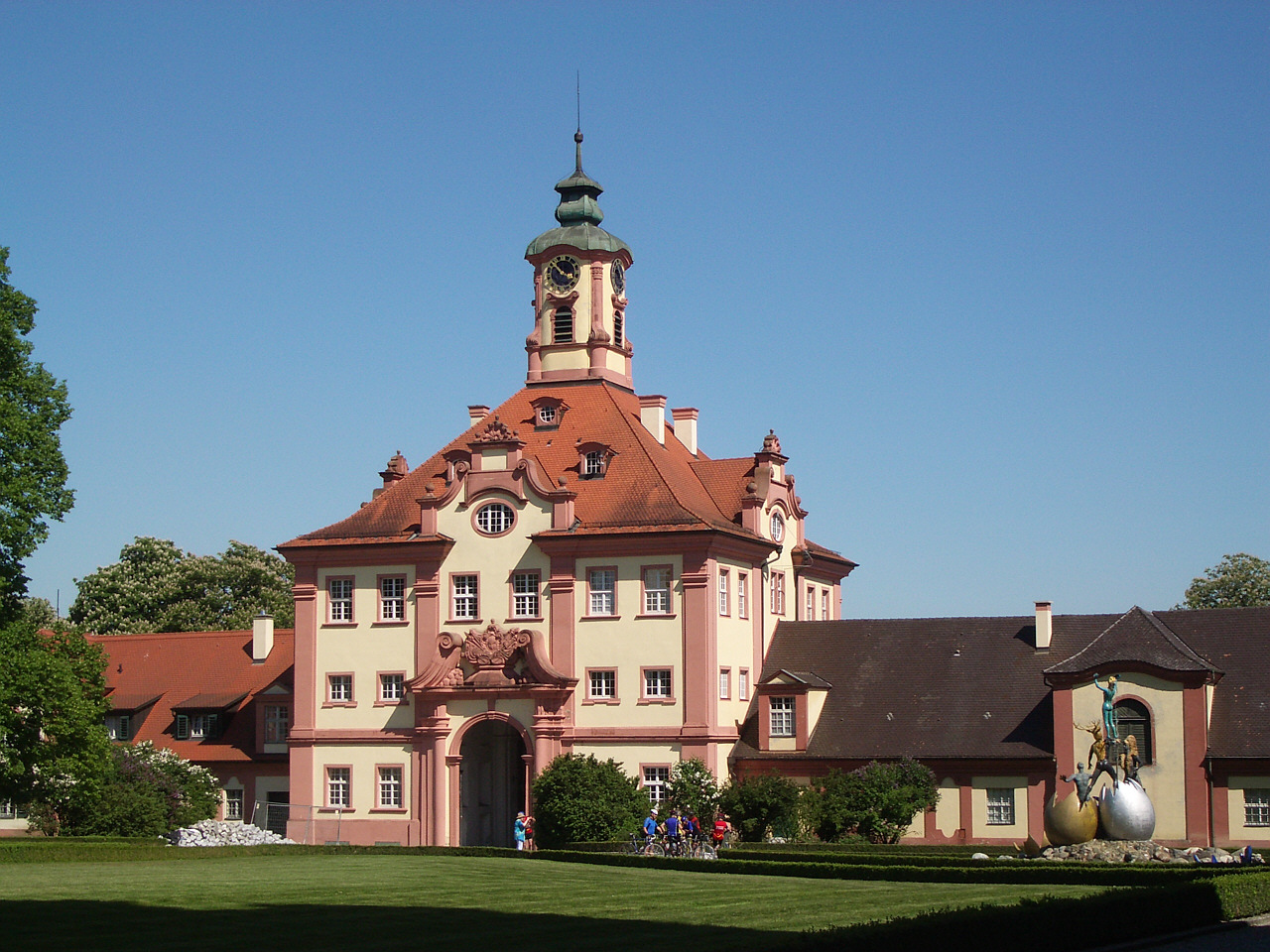
- Gate building of Altshausen Palace

- Coat of arms

- Location of Altshausen within Ravensburg district
- Interactive map of Altshausen
- Location within Germany Location within Baden-Württemberg
- Coordinates: 47°55′53″N 09°32′39″E
- Country: Germany
- State: Baden-Württemberg
- Admin. region: Tübingen
- District: Ravensburg
- Municipal assoc.: Altshausen

Government
  - Mayor (2022–30): Patrick Bauser

Area
  - Total: 20.48 km^{2} (7.91 sq mi)
- Elevation: 594 m (1,949 ft)

Population (2025-12-31)
  - Total: 3,991
  - Density: 194.9/km^{2} (504.7/sq mi)
- Time zone: UTC+01:00 (CET)
  - Summer (DST): UTC+02:00 (CEST)
- Postal codes: 88361
- Dialling codes: 07584
- Vehicle registration: RV
- Website: www.altshausen.de

Altshausen is a small Swabian municipality with around 4,100 inhabitants, near the city of Ravensburg in Baden-Württemberg, in southern Germany.

== Geography ==
Altshausen is situated in Upper Swabia, about 40 kilometers north of Lake Constance. North-west of the village is the Upper Danube Nature Park while to the South-west is the hill-chain of the Altdorfer Wald.

== Main sights ==
It is notable for its Teutonic Order castle and as the birthplace of Hermann of Reichenau. In the center of the town there is the Altshausen Schloss, which is the main palace still owned by the House of Württemberg.

== Sightseeing ==
Altshausen is part of the Upper Swabian Baroque Route, a tourist road from the Swabian Alps to Upper Swabia. On both routes the tourists can visit many monuments and points of view.

== Transport ==
Altshausen is located at the Herbertingen-Aulendorf railway.

== Notable people ==
- Franz Anton Bagnato (1731–1810), Baroque architect
- Carl Gottfried Gok (1869–1945), businessman and politician
- Hermann of Reichenau (1013–1054), Benedictine monk and scholar
- Duchess Marie-Thérèse of Württemberg (born 1934), daughter of the claimant to the royal throne of Württemberg
- Gustav Mesmer (1903–1994), inventor of human-powered flying machines
- Jost Metzler (1909–1975), World War II submarine commander
- Josef Schmid (born 1953), Olympic middle-distance runner

== Sister cities ==
- Bicske, Hungary
- Sausset-les-Pins, France (a city near Marseille)
