= Königseggwald =

- Municipality
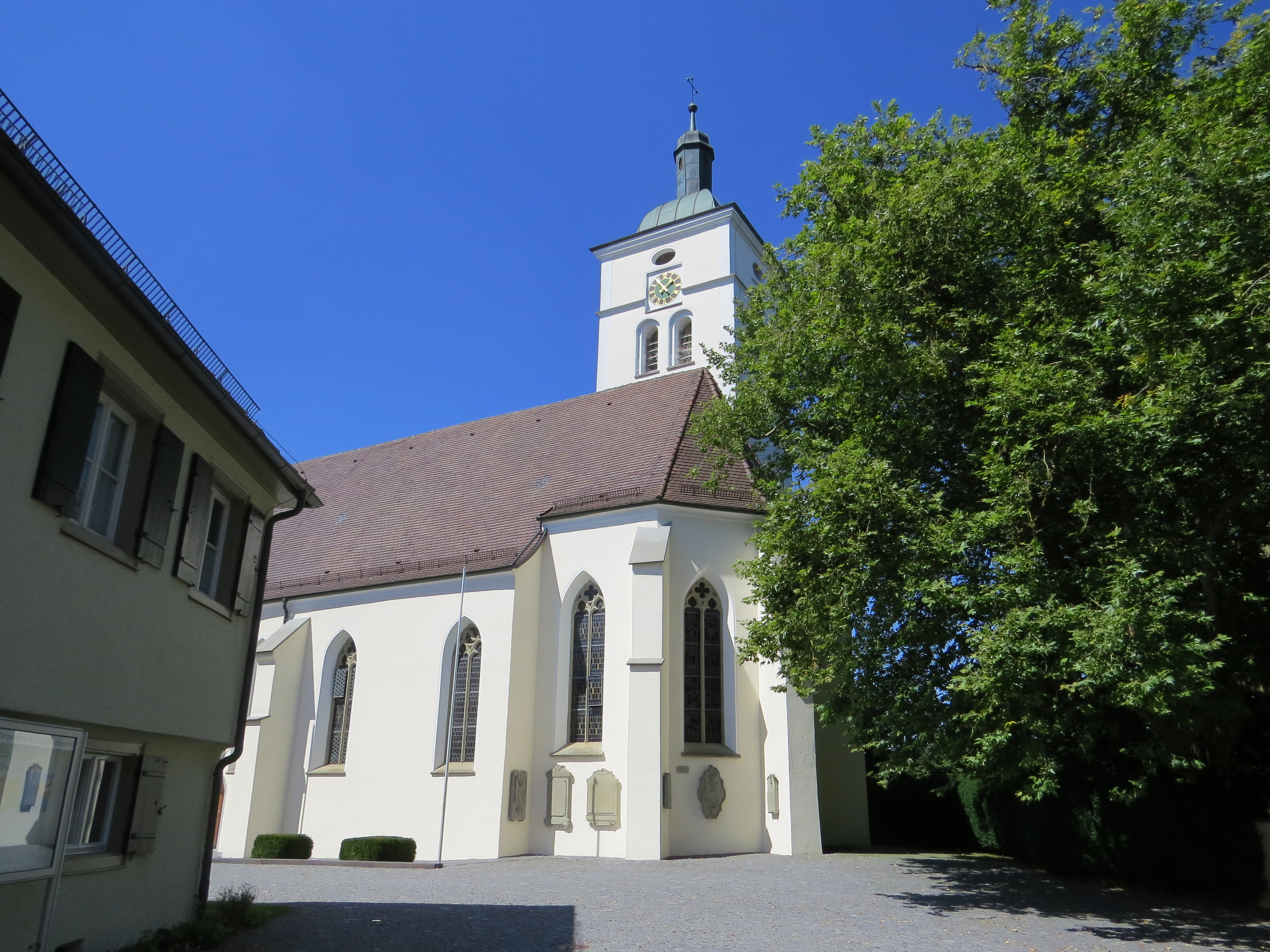
- Church of Saint George

- Coat of arms

- Location of Königseggwald within Ravensburg district
- Interactive map of Königseggwald
- Location within Germany Location within Baden-Württemberg
- Coordinates: 47°55′45″N 09°25′16″E
- Country: Germany
- State: Baden-Württemberg
- Admin. region: Tübingen
- District: Ravensburg
- Municipal assoc.: Altshausen

Government
  - Mayor (2023–31): Benedikt Endriß

Area
  - Total: 6.85 km^{2} (2.64 sq mi)
- Elevation: 661 m (2,169 ft)

Population (2025-12-31)
  - Total: 671
  - Density: 98.0/km^{2} (254/sq mi)
- Time zone: UTC+01:00 (CET)
  - Summer (DST): UTC+02:00 (CEST)
- Postal codes: 88376
- Dialling codes: 07587
- Vehicle registration: RV
- Website: www.koenigseggwald.de

Königseggwald is a town in the district of Ravensburg in Baden-Württemberg in Germany.

== Demographics ==
Population development:

Year	Inhabitants
1990	536
2001	647
2011	653
2021	694
