= Ebersbach-Musbach =

- Municipality
- Coat of arms

- Location of Ebersbach-Musbach within Ravensburg district
- Interactive map of Ebersbach-Musbach
- Location within Germany Location within Baden-Württemberg
- Coordinates: 47°57′21″N 09°34′49″E
- Country: Germany
- State: Baden-Württemberg
- Admin. region: Tübingen
- District: Ravensburg
- Municipal assoc.: Altshausen

Government
  - Mayor (2019–27): Roland Haug

Area
  - Total: 26.86 km^{2} (10.37 sq mi)
- Elevation: 643 m (2,110 ft)

Population (2025-12-31)
  - Total: 1,705
  - Density: 63.48/km^{2} (164.4/sq mi)
- Time zone: UTC+01:00 (CET)
  - Summer (DST): UTC+02:00 (CEST)
- Postal codes: 88371
- Dialling codes: 07584
- Vehicle registration: RV
- Website: www.ebersbach-musbach.de

Ebersbach-Musbach is a town in the district of Ravensburg in Baden-Württemberg in Germany.
