= Gemeindeverband =

Union of municipalities in Germany

Administrative divisions of Germany (clickable image)

Gemeindeverband (German: [ɡəˈmaɪ̯ndəfɛɐ̯ˌbant]) is a union of at least two municipalities (German: Gemeinde) in Germany to form a Körperschaft des öffentlichen Rechts (statutory corporation) with the purpose to exercise the powers of self-government at a larger scale, while maintaining autonomy of its members.

The word is mentioned multiple times in the German constitution (German: Grundgesetz), but without an exact definition.

The States of Germany have slightly different kinds of a Gemeindeverband:

Gemeindeverbände unterhalb der Kreisebene (collective municipalities) to allow direct co-operation of municipalities:

- Gemeindeverwaltungsverband in Baden-Württemberg
- Verwaltungsgemeinschaft in Bavaria
- Amt in Brandenburg
- Amt in Mecklenburg-Vorpommern
- Samtgemeinde in Lower Saxony
- Verbandsgemeinde in Rhineland-Palatinate
- Verwaltungsgemeinschaft in Saxony (not a statutory corporation)
- Verwaltungsverband in Saxony
- Verbandsgemeinde in Saxony-Anhalt
- Verwaltungsgemeinschaft in Saxony-Anhalt
- Amt in Schleswig-Holstein
- Verwaltungsgemeinschaft in Thuringia

Gemeindeverbände oberhalb der Kreisebene to allow direct co-operation of districts (Landkreis), commonly summarised as higher municipal association (German: Höherer Kommunalverband:

- Bezirk in Bavaria
- Bezirksverband Pfalz in Rhineland-Palatinate
- Landschaftsverband in North Rhine-Westphalia
- Landschaftsverband in Lower Saxony
