= Bodensee (Landtag electoral district) =

State electoral district of Germany

67: Bodensee
- Electoral district for the Landtag of Baden-Württemberg
- Bodensee in 2026
- District: Bodenseekreis
- Electorate: 132,294 (2026)
- Major settlements: Bermatingen, Daisendorf, Deggenhausertal, Eriskirch, Frickingen, Friedrichshafen, Hagnau am Bodensee, Heiligenberg, Immenstaad am Bodensee, Kressbronn am Bodensee, Langenargen, Markdorf, Meersburg, Oberteuringen, Owingen, Salem, Sipplingen, Stetten, Überlingen, and Uhldingen-Mühlhofen

Current electoral district
- Party: CDU
- Member: Alexander Bruns

Bodensee is an electoral constituency (German: Wahlkreis) represented in the Landtag of Baden-Württemberg.

Since 2026, it has elected one member via first-past-the-post voting. Voters cast a second vote under which additional seats are allocated proportionally state-wide. Under the constituency numbering system, it is designated as constituency 67.

It is wholly within the district of Bodenseekreis.

== Geography ==
The constituency includes the municipalities of Bermatingen, Daisendorf, Deggenhausertal, Eriskirch, Frickingen, Friedrichshafen, Hagnau am Bodensee, Heiligenberg, Immenstaad am Bodensee, Kressbronn am Bodensee, Langenargen, Markdorf, Meersburg, Oberteuringen, Owingen, Salem, Sipplingen, Stetten, Überlingen, and Uhldingen-Mühlhofen within the district of Bodenseekreis.

There were 132,294 eligible voters in 2026.

== Members ==
=== First mandate ===
Both prior to and since the electoral reforms for the 2026 election, the winner of the plurality of the vote (first-past-the-post) in every constituency won the first mandate.

Election	Member	Party	%
1976	Karl Schiess	CDU	
1980	August Entringer	CDU	
1984	Ernst Arnegger	CDU	
1988	Ernst Arnegger	CDU	
1992	Ulrich Müller	CDU	
1996	Ulrich Müller	CDU	
2001	Ulrich Müller	CDU	
2006	Ulrich Müller	CDU	43.7
2011	Ulrich Müller	CDU	38.1
2016	Martin Hahn	Grüne	35.7
2021	Martin Hahn	Grüne	36.8
2026	Alexander Bruns	CDU	31.7

=== Second mandate ===
Prior to the electoral reforms for the 2026 election, the seats in the state parliament were allocated proportionately amongst parties which received more than 5% of valid votes across the state. The seats that were won proportionally for parties that did not win as many first mandates as seats they were entitled to, were allocated to their candidates which received the highest proportion of the vote in their respective constituencies. This meant that following some elections, a constituency would have one or more members elected under a second mandate.

Prior to 2011, these second mandates were allocated to the party candidates who got the greatest number of votes, whilst from 2011-2021, these were allocated according to percentage share of the vote.

As the CDU won overhang seats in 1976 within the Tübingen administrative district, this constituency returned members for both the first mandates and second mandates - the later of which were awarded to the substitute candidates.

Election	Member	Party	Member	Party
1976	Hermann Precht	SPD	August Entringer	CDU
1980	Hermann Precht	SPD		
1984	Hermann Precht	SPD		
1988	Norbert Zeller	SPD	Ulrich Goll	FDP
1992	Norbert Zeller	SPD		
1996	Norbert Zeller	SPD		
2001	Norbert Zeller	SPD		
2006	Norbert Zeller	SPD	Hans-Peter Wetzel	FDP
2011	Martin Hahn	Grüne		
2016			Klaus Hoher	FDP
2021			Klaus Hoher	FDP

== Election results ==
=== 2026 election ===
State election (2026): Bodensee
Notes:	Blue background denotes the winner of the electorate vote. Pink background denotes a candidate elected from their party list. Yellow background denotes an electorate win by a list member, or other incumbent. A ✓ or ✗ denotes status of any incumbent, win or lose respectively.						
Party	Candidate	Votes	%	±%	Party votes	%	±%
CDU	Alexander Bruns	29,155	31.7	▲9.8	28,904	31.4	▲9.5
Greens	✗ Martin Hahn	26,288	28.6	▼8.2	29,227	31.7	▼5.0
AfD	Christoph Högel	15,509	16.9	▲8.3	15,677	17.0	▲8.4
SPD	Rainer Röver	6,681	7.3	▼1.2	4,351	4.7	▼3.8
FDP	Klaus Hoher	6,291	6.8	▼6.4	4,589	5.0	▼8.3
Left	Sander Frank	3,725	4.1	▲1.0	3,196	3.5	▲0.4
FW	Adrian Rößler	2,842	3.1	▲1.0	1,806	2.0	▼0.1
BSW					1,349	1.5	
Volt	David Knäple	1,365	1.5	▲1.0	846	0.9	▲0.4
APT					678	0.7	
PARTEI					347	0.4	▼1.0
dieBasis					265	0.3	▼1.1
ÖDP					182	0.2	▼0.8
Pensioners					159	0.2	
Bündnis C					145	0.2	
Values					112	0.1	
Team Todenhöfer					93	0.1	
PdF					65	0.1	
Verjüngungsforschung					50	0.1	
KlimalisteBW					46	0.0	▼0.7
Humanists					35	0.0	
Informal votes		745			479		
Total valid votes		91,853			92,122		
Turnout		92,601	70.0	▲2.9			
CDU gain from Greens	Majority	2,867	3.1				

== See also ==
- Politics of Baden-Württemberg
- Landtag of Baden-Württemberg
