= Deggenhausertal =

- Municipality
- Coat of arms

- Location of Deggenhausertal within Bodenseekreis district
- Interactive map of Deggenhausertal
- Location within Germany Location within Baden-Württemberg
- Coordinates: 47°47′N 09°24′E
- Country: Germany
- State: Baden-Württemberg
- Admin. region: Tübingen
- District: Bodenseekreis

Government
  - Mayor (2016–24): Fabian Meschenmoser

Area
  - Total: 62.18 km^{2} (24.01 sq mi)
- Elevation: 559 m (1,834 ft)

Population (2025-12-31)
  - Total: 4,408
  - Density: 70.89/km^{2} (183.6/sq mi)
- Time zone: UTC+01:00 (CET)
  - Summer (DST): UTC+02:00 (CEST)
- Postal codes: 88693
- Dialling codes: 07555
- Vehicle registration: FN
- Website: www.deggenhausertal.de

Deggenhausertal is a municipality in the district of Bodensee in Baden-Württemberg in Germany.

== Geography ==
Deggenhausertal is located in two hilly valleys between the mountains of Gehrenberg and Höchsten. It is bordered to the west by Heiligenberg and Salem, to the south by Bermatingen, Markdorf and Oberteuringen, to the east by the District of Ravensburg and its communes of Horgenzell and Wilhelmsdorf, and to the northwest by the commune of Illmensee in the District of Sigmaringen.

The commune contains 6 municipalities and several villages:

Coat of arms	Deggenhausen with the villages Ellenfurt and Obersiggingen
Coat of arms	Homberg with the villages Azenweiler, Burg, Höge, Limpach, Magetsweiler, Möggenhausen, Oberhomberg, Oberweiler, Rubacker, Unterhomberg, Wahlweiler, Wattenberg and Wippertsweiler
Coat of arms	Roggenbeuren
Coat of arms	Untersiggingen with the villages Eggenweiler, Eschle, Grünwangen and Riedetsweiler
Coat of arms	Urnau with the village of Fuchstobel
Coat of arms	Wittenhofen with the villages Harresheim, Kaltbächle, Lellwangen, Mennwangen, Sinnenberg und Wendlingen

== History ==
Historically Deggenhausertal was located in the border region between the Free Cities of Überlingen and Ravensburg, the Prince-Bishopric of Constance, Salem Abbey and the County of Heiligenberg. The different municipalities belonged to different feudal owners. By 1779, Deggenhausen, Homberg, Untersiggingen and Wittenhofen had come under the rule of the Princes of Fürstenberg; Roggenbeuren belonged to the cathedral chapter of Constance and Urnau to Salem Abbey.

In the Reichsdeputationshauptschluss of 1803, in which the principalities of the ecclesiastic rulers were dispersed to the counts and princes of the empire, Roggenbeuren and Urnau were disbursed to the Electorate of Baden. During the formation of the Confederation of the Rhine in 1806, the principality of Fürstenberg was mediatised and the other four municipalities were also annexed by Baden.

The 6 municipalities were separate communes until 1 January 1972 when they were united to form the larger conglomerate Deggenhausertal.

== Coat of arms ==
The coat of arms display black shears over a white field, with a vert nebuly chief. The shears are taken from the arms of the Lords of Deggenhausen who were ruled from Deggenhausen until the 14th century, though with the colours adopted by the municipality Deggenhausen. The chief was taken from the border of the arms of the Princes of Fürstenberg who later ruled most of the commune. The chief should be blue, not green, however by request of the district it was made green to represent the agriculture and forestry of the commune.

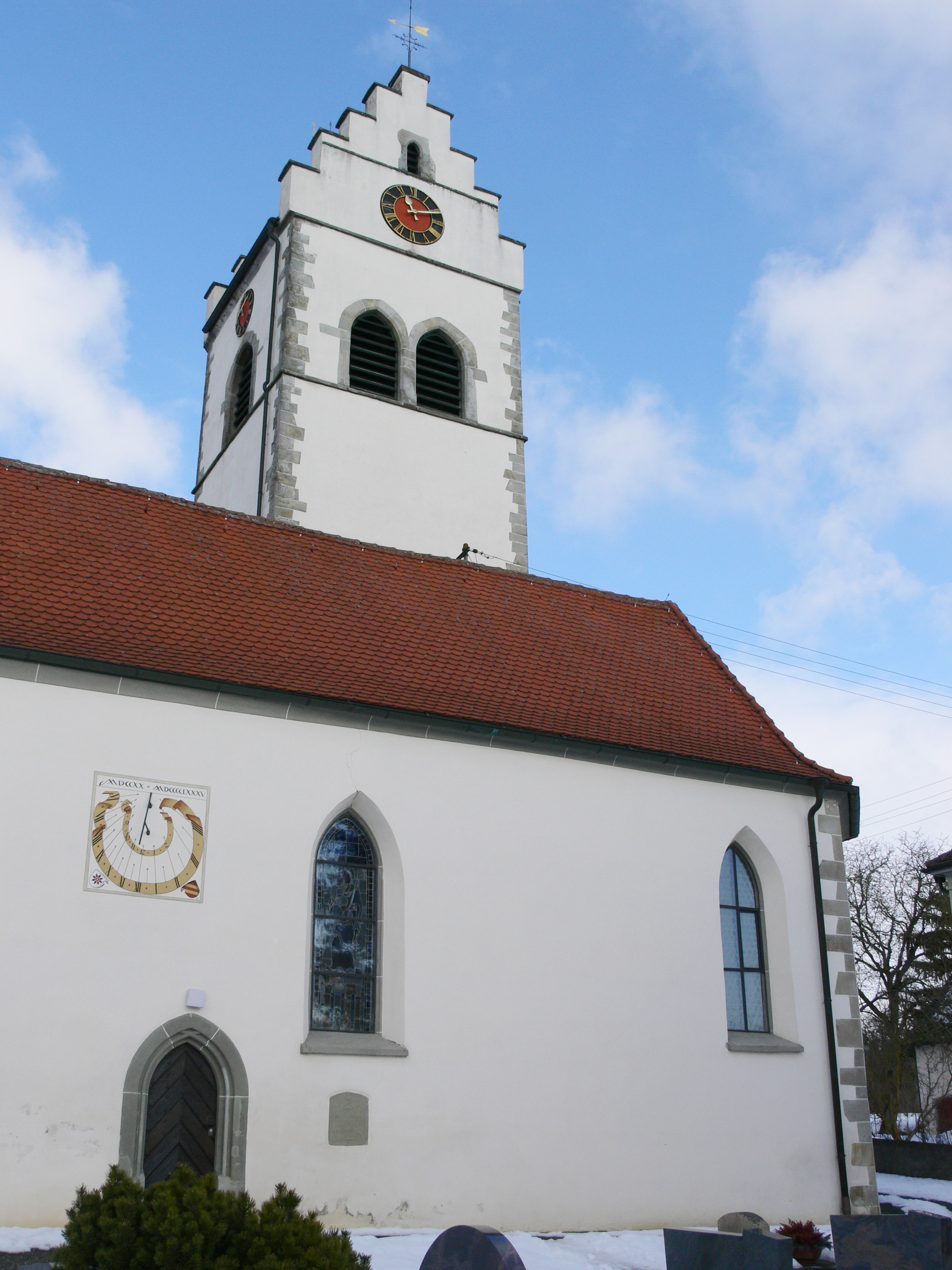
Saint George's church, Limpach, Deggenhausertal
