= Gehrenberg Tower =

Observation tower on Gehrenberg mountain in Baden-Württemberg. Germany

Coordinates: 47°44′10″N 9°24′14″E

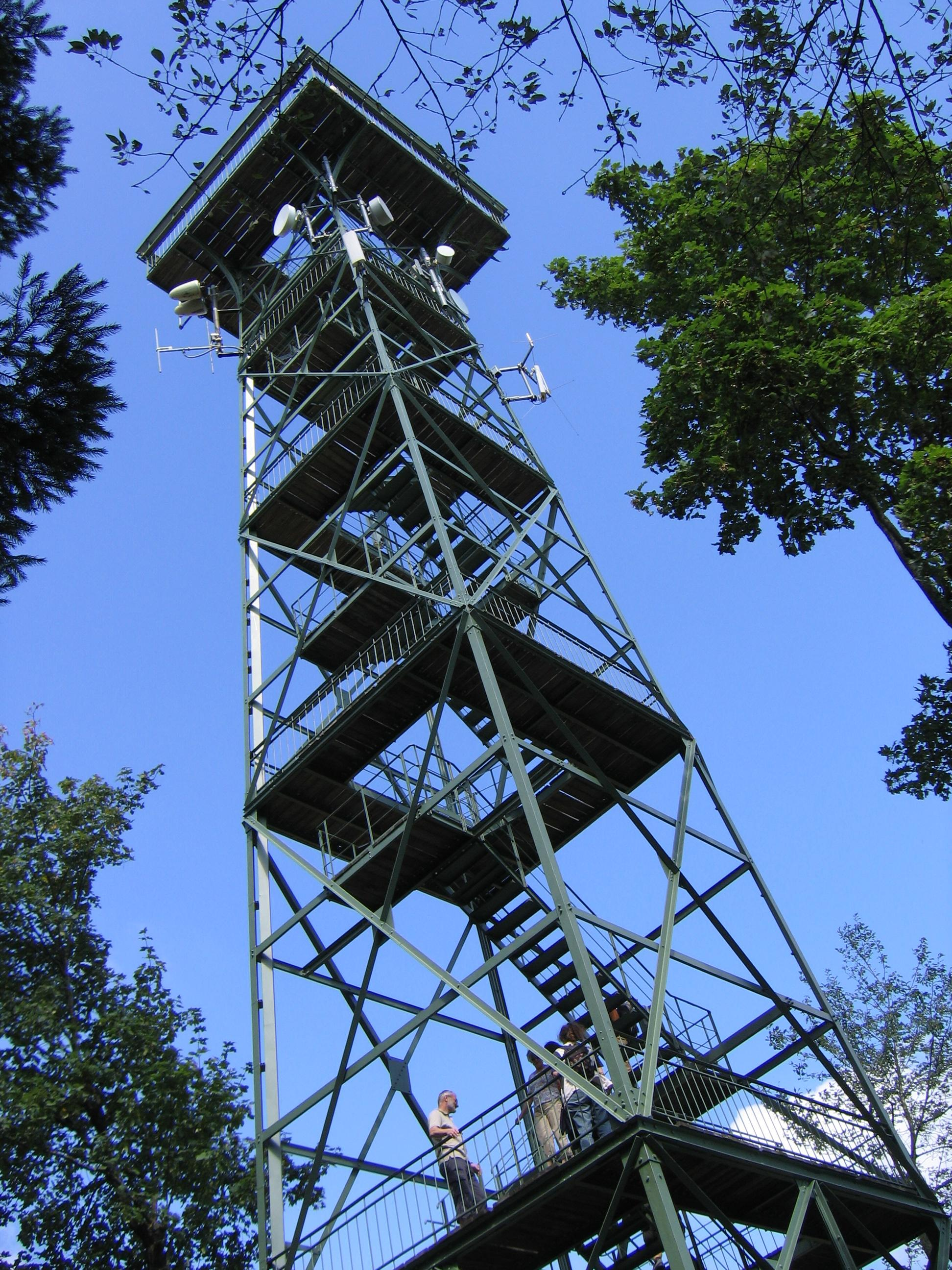
Gehrenberg Tower

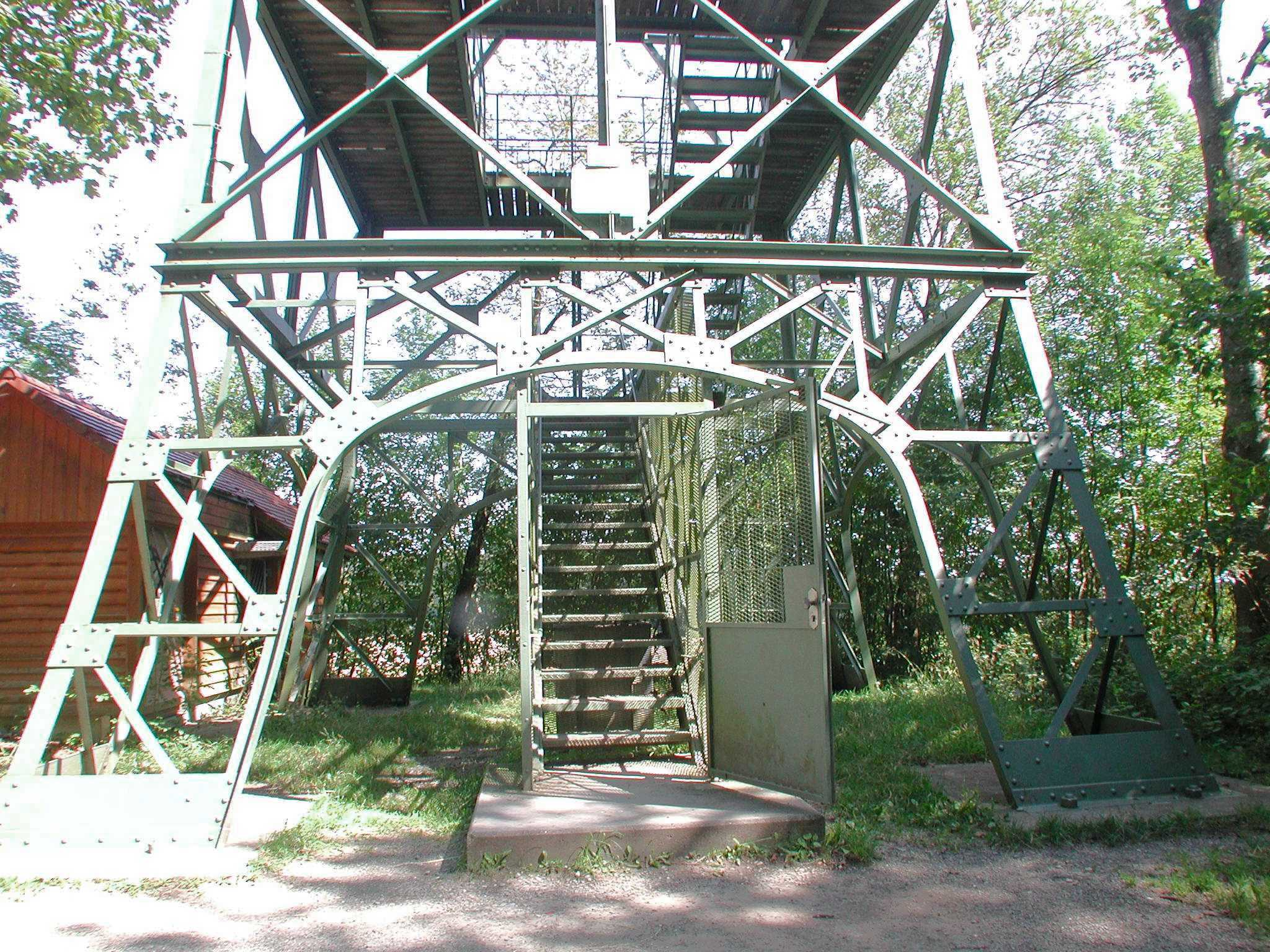
Gehrenberg Tower Entrance

Gehrenberg Tower is a 30 metres tall observation tower of lattice steel on Gehrenberg, a 754 m high mountain north of Markdorf, standing at an elevation of 704 m. Gehrenberg Tower has some similarities to Eiffel Tower as it also has a bow between its feet. From the observation deck of Gehrenberg Tower, one can see at clear weather the Alps and the Höchsten mountain.

Gehrenberg Tower, which carries also antennas, belongs to the town of Markdorf, although it stands on the area of Deggenhausertal.

== See also ==
- List of towers
