= Linzgau =

Coordinates: 47°48′N 09°10′E

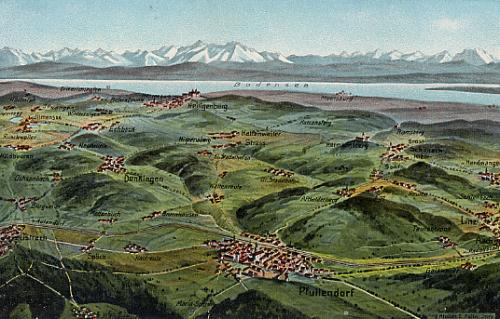
View over Linzgau from Pfullendorf, postcard, c. 1900

Linzgau is a historic region in Southern Germany, in the state of Baden-Württemberg. It is located north of Lake Constance and south of the Danube valley.

== Geography ==
The region is bounded by the shore of Lake Constance on the south, the Hegau region on the west, the Rhine-Danube watershed on the north, and the Schussen valley on the east. It reaches west as far as Überlingen and north as far as Pfullendorf. The highest peak is Mt. Höchsten with a height of 837.8 m (2,749 ft).

While the lower parts on the lakeshore are part of the Bodenseekreis district, the upper lands belong to Sigmaringen district. Beside Pfullendorf and Überlingen, the region comprises the town of Markdorf, Meersburg, the municipality of Salem and several smaller communities.

== History ==
The name derives from a Celtic name Lentia for what is now known as the Linzer Aach river.

=== Prehistoric times ===
The best-known remains of prehistoric human habitation in the region are the Neolithic and Bronze Age pile dwellings on the shores of Lake Constance, of which some examples are reconstructed at Unteruhldingen. Similar Neolithic structures have also been found in a peat bog near Ruhestetten in the municipality of Wald.

From the late Hallstatt culture on, the population can be regarded as Celts. Burial mounds have been discovered at Hödingen, Salem, and Stetten.

=== Roman times ===
From the first century BC to the third century AD, the area was part of the Roman Empire. Roman settlements existed at Bambergen, Meersburg, and Mettenbuch in the municipality of Ostrach.

After the Roman withdrawal beyond the Rhine, Germanic tribes settled in the area. The original Celtic name of the stream gave its name to an Alamannic tribe, the Lentienses mentioned in the fourth century AD by the Roman historian Ammianus Marcellinus.

=== Middle Ages ===
As part of Alemannia, Linzgau was acquired by the Frankish Empire in the 6th century, becoming part of the Duchy of Swabia in the 10th. In 1135, the counts of Heiligenberg received the county of Linzgau. From them, it passed to the Count of Werdenberg in 1277, and later to the Count of Fürstenberg in 1535. The area was then mostly called the County of Heiligenberg.

=== Modern times ===
In the early 19th century, under the rule of Napoleon, the Linzgau was assigned to the Grand Duchy of Baden, so the name became synonymous with the district of Überlingen. Today, the area encompasses the districts of Bodensee and Sigmaringen.

=== Linzgau today ===
Today, the only official use for the term Linzgau is the Catholic deanery. However, it is regaining popularity, as shown by the naming of the new shopping center in Pfullendorf the Linzgau-Center or the slogan of Markdorf: Heart of the Linzgau.

The regional tourist association also calls itself Bodensee-Linzgau Tourismus e.V.

== Landscape ==
The southern part of the Linzgau lies on the banks of Lake Constance and has a milder climate, which lends itself to fruit orchards and vineyards. The landscape is rolling, but fairly flat, with occasional drumlins caused by deposits from the retreating Rhine Glacier in the last ice age.

The northern part (or upper Linzgau) has a more rugged climate and rises to as high as 833 m. It is characterized by glacial moraines, with occasional swamps and small lakes, especially in the northeast. Agriculture is largely dedicated to grain.

Most of the Linzgau is still rural, with the most heavily populated areas along the shores of Lake Constance. The largest cities are Überlingen, Pfullendorf, and Markdorf.

== Transport ==
The national highways 31 and 33, which run from east to west along Lake Constance are the only major highways through the region.

A car ferry runs from Meersburg across the arm of Lake Constance called the Überlinger See to connect with Constance.
