= Untersiggingen =

Village in Baden-Württemberg, Germany

Coordinates: 47°46′32″N 9°22′42″E

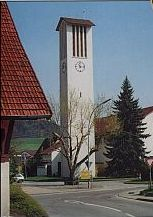

Untersiggingen is a village in the municipality Deggenhausertal in Baden-Württemberg Germany. Deggenhausertal itself is a part of the district Bodenseekreis which is on the north shore of Lake Constanz.

== Geography ==
Untersiggingen is situated in a valley of the small river of Deggenhauser Ach between the two hills Heiligenberg and Gehrenberg. The village lies on both sides of the river. The older, mainly residential, part of the village lies on the southern bank. An industrial region was built on the northern bank in the 1980s.

== History ==
Two prehistoric burial mounds are located near the village, demonstrating ancient settlement in the region. The village was first attested to in 772 in a document of St Gall's Abbey in which the village is written Villa Sicginga. The name derives from the proper name Sicgo.

From the 10th to the 13th Centuries are documents that attest to knights in the valley named the Herren von Siggingen (Lords of Siggingen). The most significant were Albert von Siggingen and his son Rudolf, who had their base in the "Siggingertal" (the former name of Deggenhausertal) in the 12th Century. Their castle was built near the village and its moat, fundament and the weir system are still visible. It is unknown when the castle was destroyed.

By 1288 Untersiggingen and Obersiggingen in the municipality of Deggenhausen had been separated, both having passed to the Counts of Montfort and later the Counts of Werdenberg-Heiligenberg. In 1313 the counts of Werdenberg-Heiligenberg sold Untersiggingen to the Hospital of the Holy Spirit in Überlingen, though they retained rights to judicial power in the district. In 1459 the city of Überlingen confirmed the hospital's jurisdiction of the village, and from 1465 to 1468 its fiscal and military independence. In 1779 the village was sold by the hospital to the House of Fürstenberg.

In 1806 Fürstenberg was mediatised by the Grand Duchy of Baden.

In 1956 Untersiggingen received its own water supply. In 1967 a new school building was built next to the old school building. Since 1 January 1972 the independent municipality got a part of the new created municipality Deggenhausertal.

On the boundary of Untersiggingen a new industrial region arose. The new timber yard of the new formed municipality Deggenhausertal found his place in the new industrial region. There was new building site created in the west of the village along the river of Ach. The gaps between buildings inside the village were also closed by new houses.

== Economy and Infrastructure ==
In spite of its small number of inhabitants Untersiggingen has its own supermarket. In the center of the village is a kind of a pharmacy, and not far away a small restaurant and a fitness studio.

=== Companies ===
- Moog GmbH Moog GmbH has about 50 workers. The company is constructing and producing under-bridge platforms.
- Kneisler Brünnier Technik
- Stengelin Metallverarbeitung

== Coat of arms ==
The coat of arms display a blue-clothed man on a hill and holding a tulip. The arms were granted in 1902, and were based on the communities' seal in the 19th Century.
