= Roggenbeuren =

Village in Baden-Württemberg, Germany

- Village
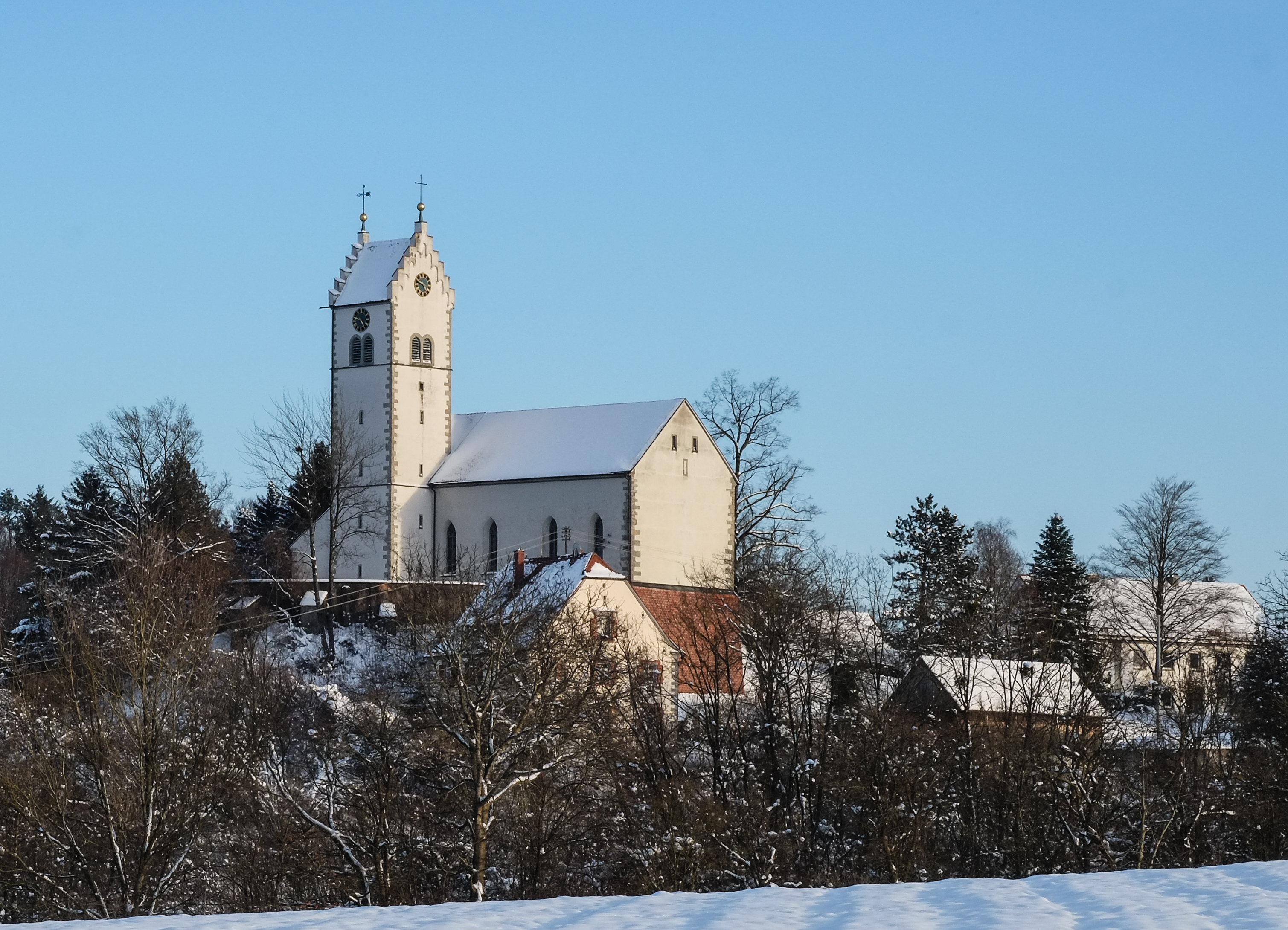
- Roggenbeuren
- Interactive map of Roggenbeuren
- Coordinates: 47°46′10″N 9°24′21″E
- Country: Germany
- State: Baden-Württemberg
- District: Bodenseekreis
- Municipality: Deggenhausertal

Roggenbeuren is a village in the municipality of Deggenhausertal in the Bodenseekreis district of Baden-Württemberg, Germany.

== Geography ==
Roggenbeuren is located in a valley halfway between Urnau and Wittenhofen.

== History ==
Burial mounds in the vicinity prove that the area has been settled since prehistoric times. The first mention of Roggenbeuren dates from a donation from St Gall's Abbey in 860/1 in which the brothers Otholf and Teothard donated their territory in Gehrenberg to the abbey, and received the Roggenbeuren in exchange. Roggenbeuren later came into the hands of the ministerialis family of Schmalegg. In 1280 Conrad of Schmalegg sold the territory to the cathedral chapter of Constance. The upper jurisdiction was held by the Counts of Werdenberg-Heiligenberg and after their extinction in 1534 by the Counts of Fürstenberg.

In the Reichsdeputationshauptschluss of 1803, in which the principalities of the ecclesiastic rulers were dispersed to the counts and princes of the empire, Roggenbeuren with the other territories of the Prince-Bishopric of Constance was ceded to the Electorate of Baden.

== Coat of arms ==
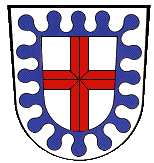
Argent cross gules in a bordure argent nebuly azure The coat of arms display a red cross on a white field within a nebuly blue and white border. The red cross is taken from the arms of the Prince-Bishopric of Constance, which ruled over the village until 1803. The border is taken from the arms of the Princes of Fürstenberg who also held certain rights over the village in the pre-modern era.
