= Homberg (Deggenhausertal) =

- Ortsteil of Deggenhausertal
- Coat of arms
- Interactive map of Homberg
- Location within Germany Location within Baden-Württemberg
- Coordinates: 47°49′N 9°25′E
- Country: Germany
- State: Baden-Württemberg
- Admin. region: Tübingen
- District: Bodenseekreis
- Municipality: Deggenhausertal

Population (2020)
  - Total: 783
- Time zone: UTC+01:00 (CET)
  - Summer (DST): UTC+02:00 (CEST)

Homberg is a municipality in the commune Deggenhausertal in Baden-Württemberg, Germany. Deggenhausertal itself is a part of the district Bodenseekreis which is on the north shore of Lake Constanz.

== Geography ==
Homberg forms the northeastern portion of the commune, spread across numerous valleys. Homberg includes the villages Azenweiler, Burg, Höge, Limpach, Magetsweiler, Möggenhausen, Oberhomberg, Oberweiler, Rubacker, Unterhomberg, Wahlweiler, Wattenberg and Wippertsweiler.

== History ==
The first mention of Homberg was in 1191, in mention of the church in the village Oberhomberg. The Lords of Homberg are attested between 1171 and 1364, though it is uncertain if they are connected with the municipality or not. In comparison, the noble family of Limpach, named after the eponymous village in the centre of the municipality, is attested to between 1171 and 1380 and the remains of their ancestral castle are located southwest of Benistobel. During the 12th Century the wealthy Salem and Weingarten Abbeys obtained considerable influence in the region though the sovereign rights most likely belonged to the Counts of Heiligenberg from this time.

In 1534 the region passed to the Counts of Fürstenberg after the extinction of the Werdenberg-Heiligenberg family. In 1806 Fürstenberg was mediatised by the Grand Duchy of Baden.
