= Salem, Baden-Württemberg =

Salem
- Municipality
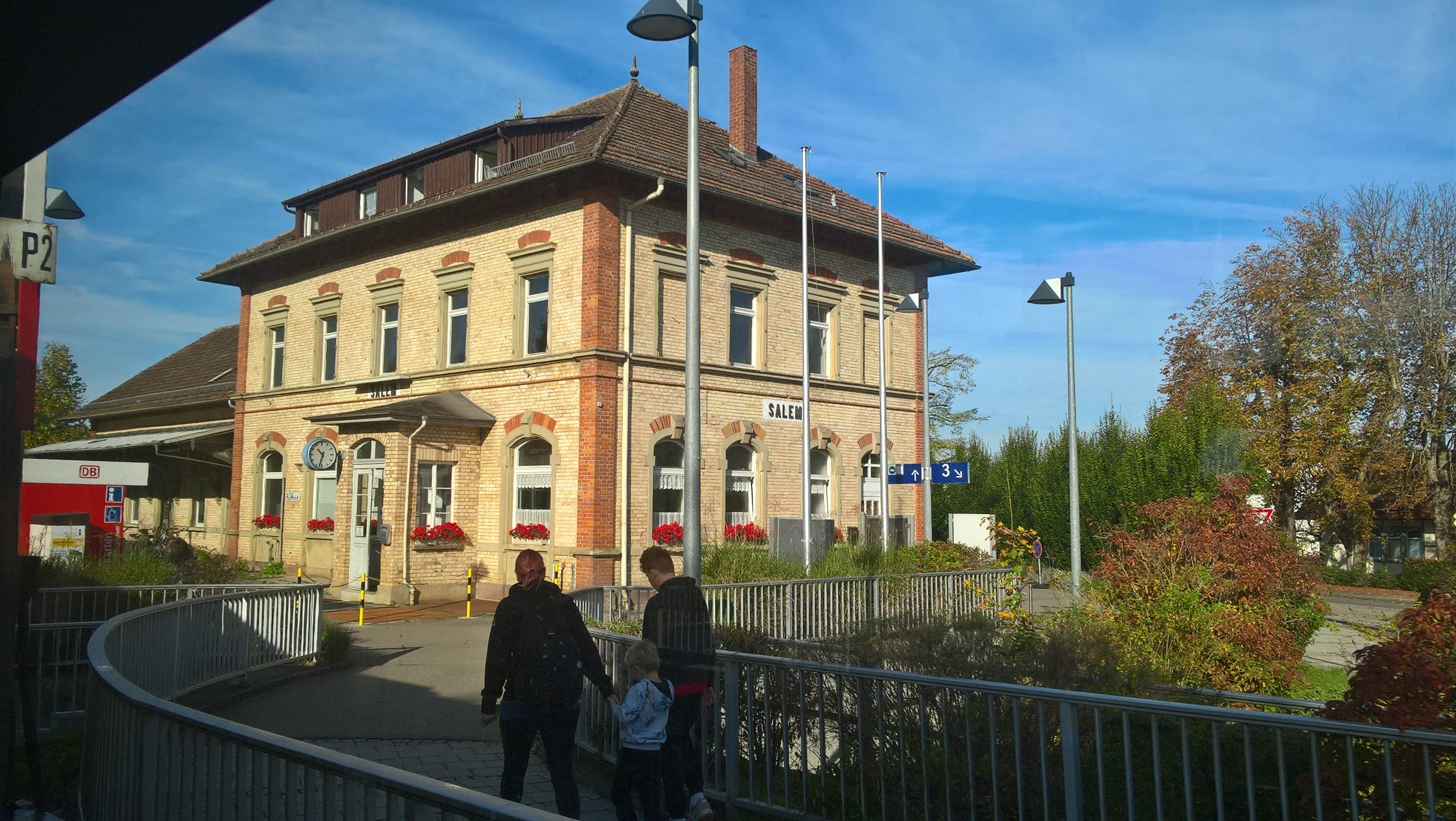
- Salem train station

- Coat of arms

- Location of Salem within Bodenseekreis district
- Interactive map of Salem
- Location within Germany Location within Baden-Württemberg
- Coordinates: 47°46′00″N 09°17′45″E
- Country: Germany
- State: Baden-Württemberg
- Admin. region: Tübingen
- District: Bodenseekreis

Government
  - Mayor (2020–28): Manfred Härle

Area
  - Total: 62.69 km^{2} (24.20 sq mi)
- Elevation: 440 m (1,440 ft)

Population (2025-12-31)
  - Total: 12,252
  - Density: 195.4/km^{2} (506.2/sq mi)
- Time zone: UTC+01:00 (CET)
  - Summer (DST): UTC+02:00 (CEST)
- Postal codes: 88682
- Dialling codes: 07553, 07554, 07544, 07556
- Vehicle registration: FN
- Website: www.salem-baden.de

Salem (German pronunciation: [ˈzaːləm]) is a municipality in the Bodensee district of Baden-Württemberg in Southern Germany, located 9 km (5.6 mi) north of Lake Constance, with a population of 11,100.

== Geography ==
The community is located about nine kilometers (5.6 miles) east of Überlingen and ten kilometers (6.2 miles) north east of Meersburg in Linzgau mainly in the valley of Linzer Aach. The district Oberstenweiler is situated on a side peak of the Gehrenberg up to 600 metres (2,000 ft) height. The district area covers approximately 6,270 hectares (24 1/4 mi^{2}) (as of December 31, 2014).

== Neighboring communities ==
The community is adjacent to Überlingen, Meersburg, Bermatingen, Heiligenberg, Deggenhausertal, Frickingen and Uhldingen-Mühlhofen.

== Municipality arrangement ==
The town of Salem consists of eleven member locations. The locations (as at 31 December 2014) are listed below:

- Salem Stefansfeld (chief town) 743 hectares (2 3/4 mi^{2})
- Beuren 888 hectares (3 1/2 mi^{2})
- Buggensegel 361 hectares (1 1/2 mi^{2})
- Grasbeuren 347 hectares (1 1/4 mi^{2})
- Mimmenhausen 628 hectares (2 1/2 mi^{2})
- Mittelstenweiler 314 hectares (1 1/4 mi^{2})
- Neufrach 1,030 hectares (4 mi^{2})
- Oberstenweiler 324 hectares (1 1/4 mi^{2})
- Rickenbach 171 hectares (3/4 mi^{2})
- Tüfingen 911 hectares (3 1/2 mi^{2})
- Weildorf 551 hectares (2 1/4 mi^{2})

== History ==
For a detailed history of the monastery, see the article about Salem Abbey.

The area has been populated since at least the Bronze Age. Beginning in the 3rd century, the Alemanni and, later, the Franks established several villages, including the small settlement of Salemanneswilare (later Salmannsweiler). Salem Abbey, founded by the Order of Cistercians, was established here in 1134. It quickly achieved the rank of an imperial abbey.

From about 1285 to 1425, the High Gothic Salem Münster (Minster) was built, and it has been preserved until the current day. During the 17th century, the monastery had to cope with serious setbacks, including the Thirty Years' War, which brought death and destruction to many areas.

In 1697, a fire destroyed not only most of the buildings, but also numerous art treasures owned by the abbey. Subsequently, under the master builder Franz Beer of Vorarlberg, the Baroque buildings currently standing on the site were built.

Among other things, Abbot Anselm II Schwab founded an Orphans' Fund in 1749 that is considered the first savings bank in Germany. Anselm also had the pilgrimage church Birnau built on the shores of Lake Constance.

The heyday of the monastery ended with the German mediatization in 1803. It was secularized, and the territory fell to the Margraviate of Baden.

== Culture and sights ==
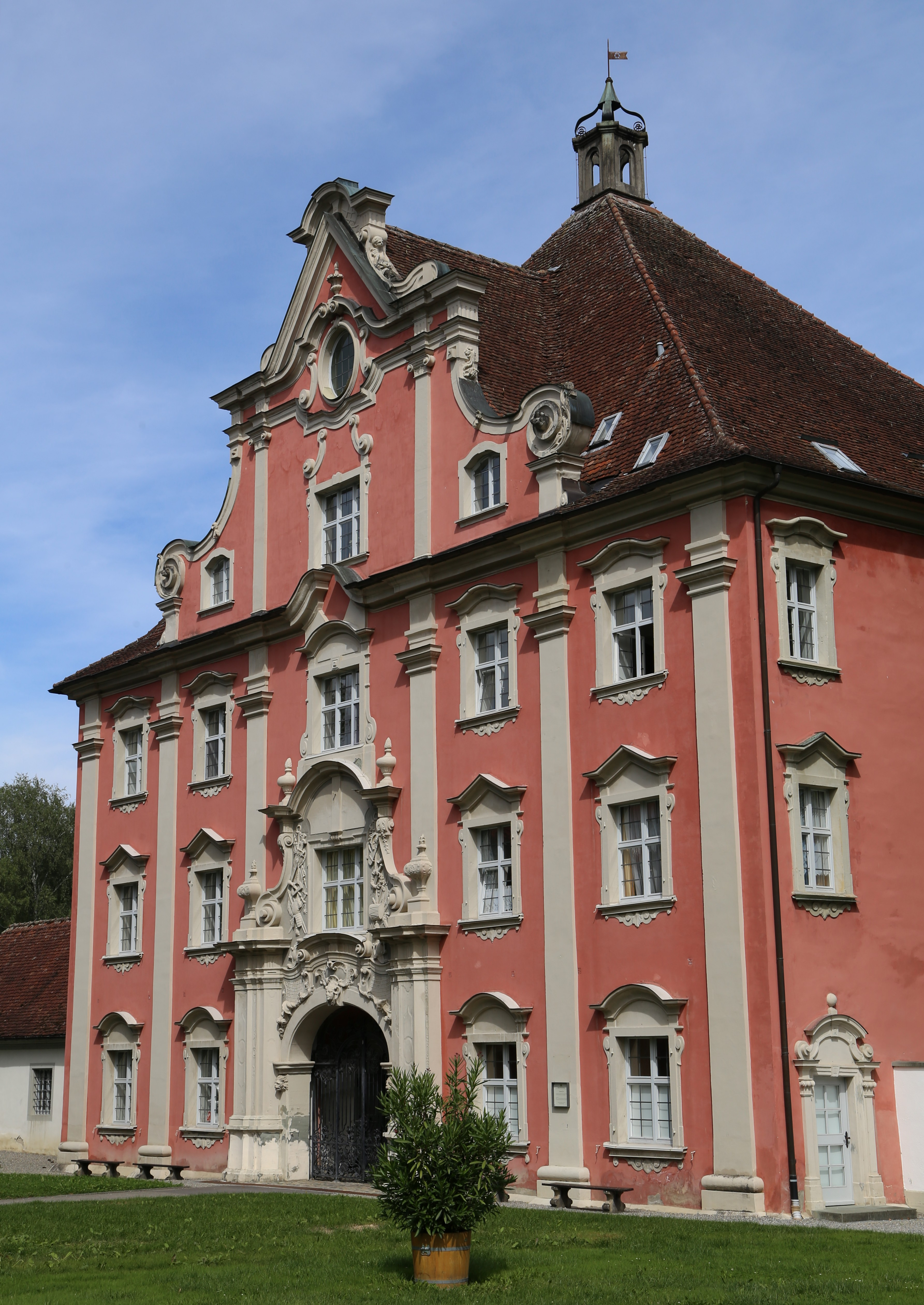
Salem Abbey

The Cistercian monastery of Salem Abbey was founded in 1134, when the knight Guntram von Adelsreute donated land for its establishment. The abbey already had its own scriptorium in the 12th century and formed one of the most important monastery libraries in Europe.

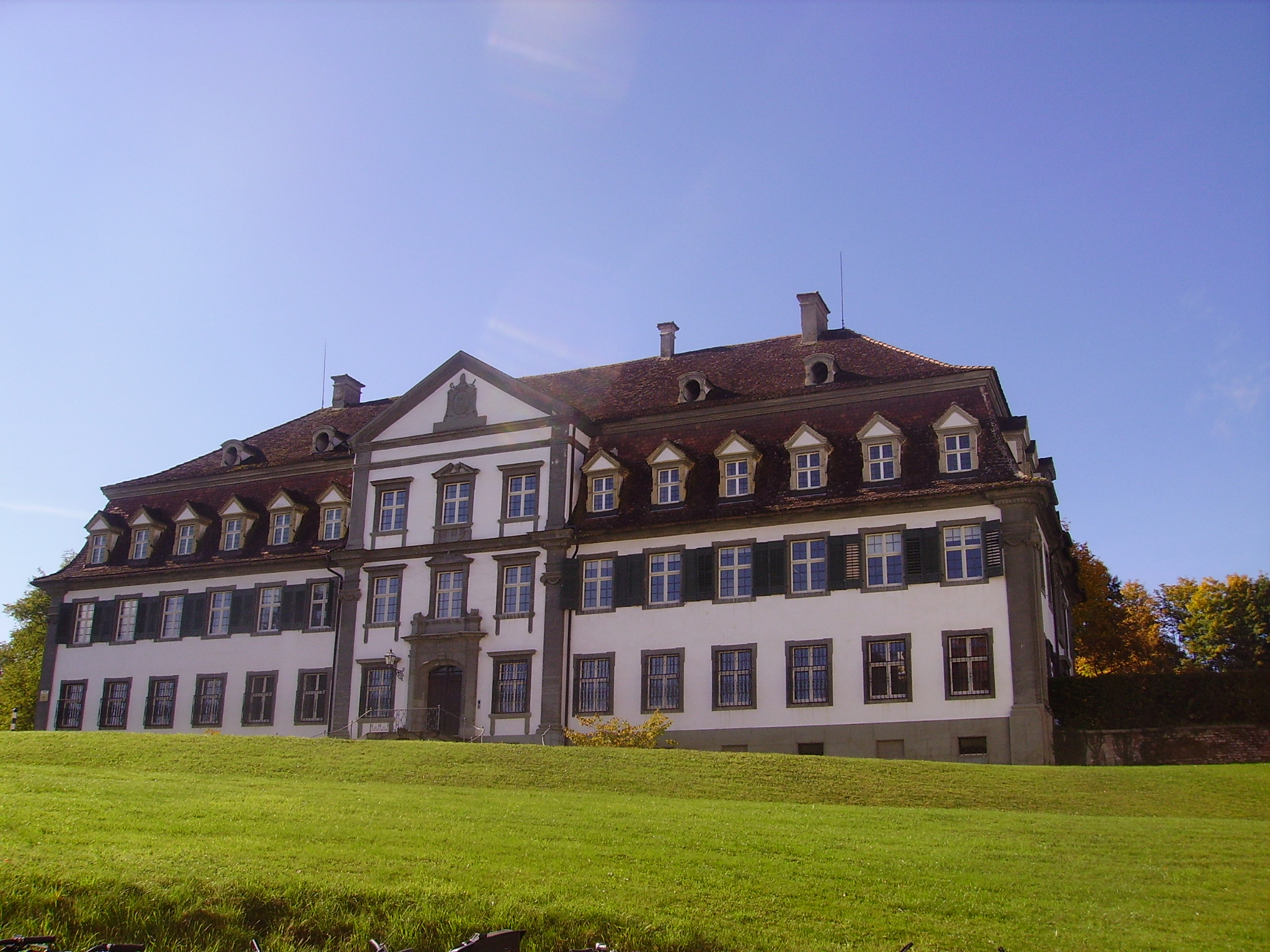
Schule Schloss Salem

Currently, the grounds are home to the middle school campus of Schule Schloss Salem, a boarding school founded in 1920 by Kurt Hahn and Prince Max of Baden. The abbey complex covers a total of 17 hectares.

Other sights are the Gothic-style Salem Minster (the former church of the abbey complex) and the Baroque chapel.

== Sports ==
In summer, the Schlosssee (castle lake) attracts swimmers from all over the region. There are also tennis courts, a football and athletics stadium, sports grounds, sports halls and rehearsal rooms for teams.

== Teams ==
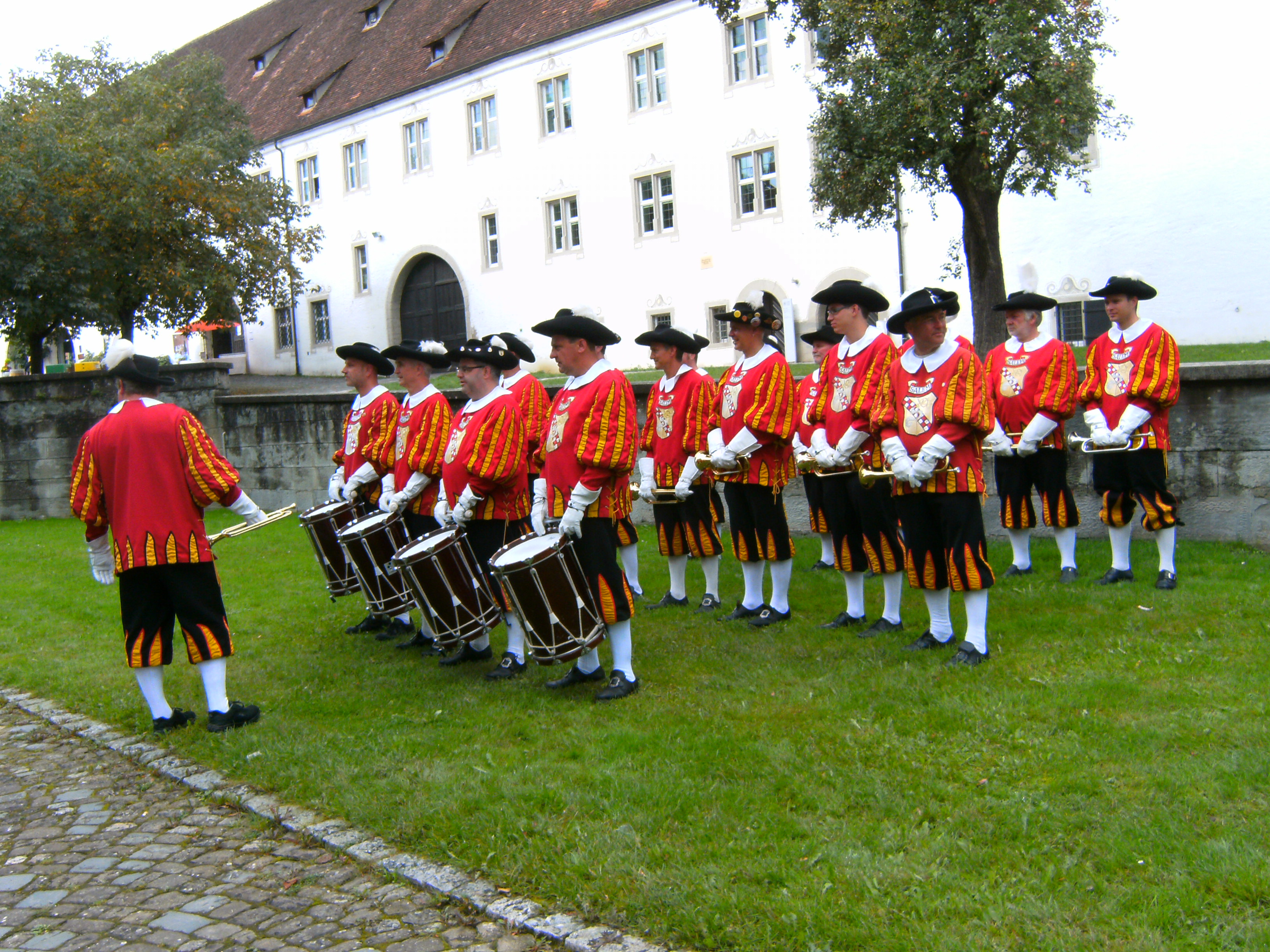
Salem Fanfarenzug

Fanfarenzug Salem during the day of open doors on 14 September 2014 in Salem Monastery and Palace.

Salem has numerous clubs, including the Fanfarenzug Salem.

== Regular events ==
The Schloss Seefest Salem, one of the largest open-air events in the Lake Constance region, is held every first summer holiday weekend. International artists perform large outdoor concerts on the castle grounds in the lakeside park.

== Notable people ==
- Joseph Anton Feuchtmayer (1696–1770), Rococo plasterer and sculptor
- Johann Baptist von Keller (1774–1845), Bishop of Rottenburg
- Maximilian, Margrave of Baden (1933–2022), head of the House of Baden 1963–2022.
- Bernhard, Margrave of Baden (born 1970), German prince and head of the House of Baden since 2022.
