= Rammetshofen =

Village in Baden Wuerttemberg, Germany

Coordinates: 47°43′N 9°28′E

Rammetshofen is a village located 1.6 kilometres (1 mile) south of Oberteuringen in the Bodenseekreis of the federal state of Baden-Württemberg in Germany. It lies approximately 7.5 kilometres (4.7 mi) north of the Bodensee.

== History ==
The Hallstatt culture was present in Rammetshofen, which has been evidenced by grave finds from the time period.

In 1464, Joerg Count of Werdenberg and Heiligenberg, leased the Ramrachs Farm (an estate at Rammetshofen) to Ytelhans Huntpis, a citizen of Ravensburg. After Huntpis' death, the estate is again mentioned in a certificate dated 1538. In the early 19th century Rammetshofen had 58 inhabitants, which were explicitly labelled as "catholic" in a description by the relevant municipal authority in Tettnang.
