= Bermatingen =

- Municipality
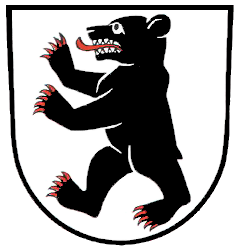
- Coat of arms

- Location of Bermatingen within Bodenseekreis district
- Interactive map of Bermatingen
- Location within Germany Location within Baden-Württemberg
- Coordinates: 47°43′45″N 09°21′00″E
- Country: Germany
- State: Baden-Württemberg
- Admin. region: Tübingen
- District: Bodenseekreis

Government
  - Mayor (2017–25): Martin Rupp

Area
  - Total: 15.45 km^{2} (5.97 sq mi)
- Elevation: 440 m (1,440 ft)

Population (2025-12-31)
  - Total: 4,116
  - Density: 266.4/km^{2} (690.0/sq mi)
- Time zone: UTC+01:00 (CET)
  - Summer (DST): UTC+02:00 (CEST)
- Postal codes: 88697
- Dialling codes: 07544
- Vehicle registration: FN
- Website: www.bermatingen.de

Bermatingen is a commune in the district of Bodensee in Baden-Württemberg in Germany.

== Geography ==
Bermatingen is located 4 km west of Markdorf in the valley of the Seefelder Aach. It is bordered to the north by Salem, the east by Deggenhausertal, the south by Markdorf, and the west by Meersburg.

The commune comprises two municipalities: Bermatingen (with the villages of Autenweiler and Wiggenweiler), and Ahausen. The two municipalities were joined into the same commune on 1 January 1973.

== History ==
=== Bermatingen ===
Alemannian farmers settled in the region in the 5th-7th Centuries. The first mention of Bermatingen is in 779 as Permodingas, in which Ato and his wife Herosta donated the village to St Gall's Abbey in modern Switzerland. A family of knights of Bermatingen are mentioned beginning in 1166, and they constructed a castle at Burg Bermatingen to the northeast of the town. The last mention of the family is in 1303. The village later passed to the ministerialis family of the Schenk von Ittendorf, who sold their rights to the town to Salem Abbey in 1390.

In 1525 during the German Peasants' War, Eitelhans Ziegelmüller, one of the peasant commanders, took Bermatingen and used it as a base to attack towns, castles and monasteries in the surrounding region as far as Buchhorn (modern Friedrichshafen). The peasants marched to battle at Weingarten by late April where they made peace with the forces of the Swabian League under George III Truchsess of Waldburg-Zeil, agreeing to end the insurrection and returning property to its feudal owners in exchange for improved conditions and right to arbitration in disputes.

Bermatingen was devastated by a fire in 1590 and the Salem abbot Peter Müller directed the effort to reconstruct the town.

In the Reichsdeputationshauptschluss of 1803, in which the principalities of the ecclesiastic rulers were dispersed to the counts and princes of the empire, Bermatingen with the rest of the territory of Salem Abbey was disbursed to the Electorate of Baden.

=== Ahausen ===
Ahausen was first mentioned in a donation on 10 May 752 as Hahahusir to St Galls' Abbey. The village later passed to the Schenks von Ittendorf, Lindau Abbey, the Free City of Überlingen in 1434, Fahr Abbey in 1651, temporarily to Weingarten Abbey in 1693, and finally to the Prince-Bishopric of Constance later that year. The Prince-Bishopric administered Ahausen with neighbouring town Ittendorf (in Markdorf commune).

Ahausen passed to the Electorate of Baden in the Reichsdeputationshauptschluss in 1803.

Ahausen was subject to the heavy flooding of the Seefelder Aach for much of its history. The last catastrophic flood was in 1906 before the construction of a dam and corrective works for the flow of the river.

== Coat of arms ==
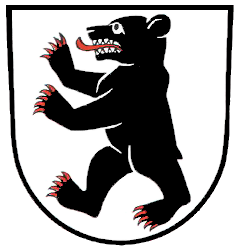
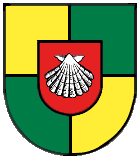
Bermatingen; The first use of the bear as the symbol of the town dates from a private contract between two villagers in 1506. It is hypothesised the bear (German: bär) is a canting of the prefix Per, from the ancient name of the town (Permodingas).
Ahausen; The arms were adopted in 1902. The gold and green quarters are derived from the arms of the Lords of Ellerbach, which were proven as resident to the town in the 15th Century. The shell is in reference to St James' Chapel in the town.

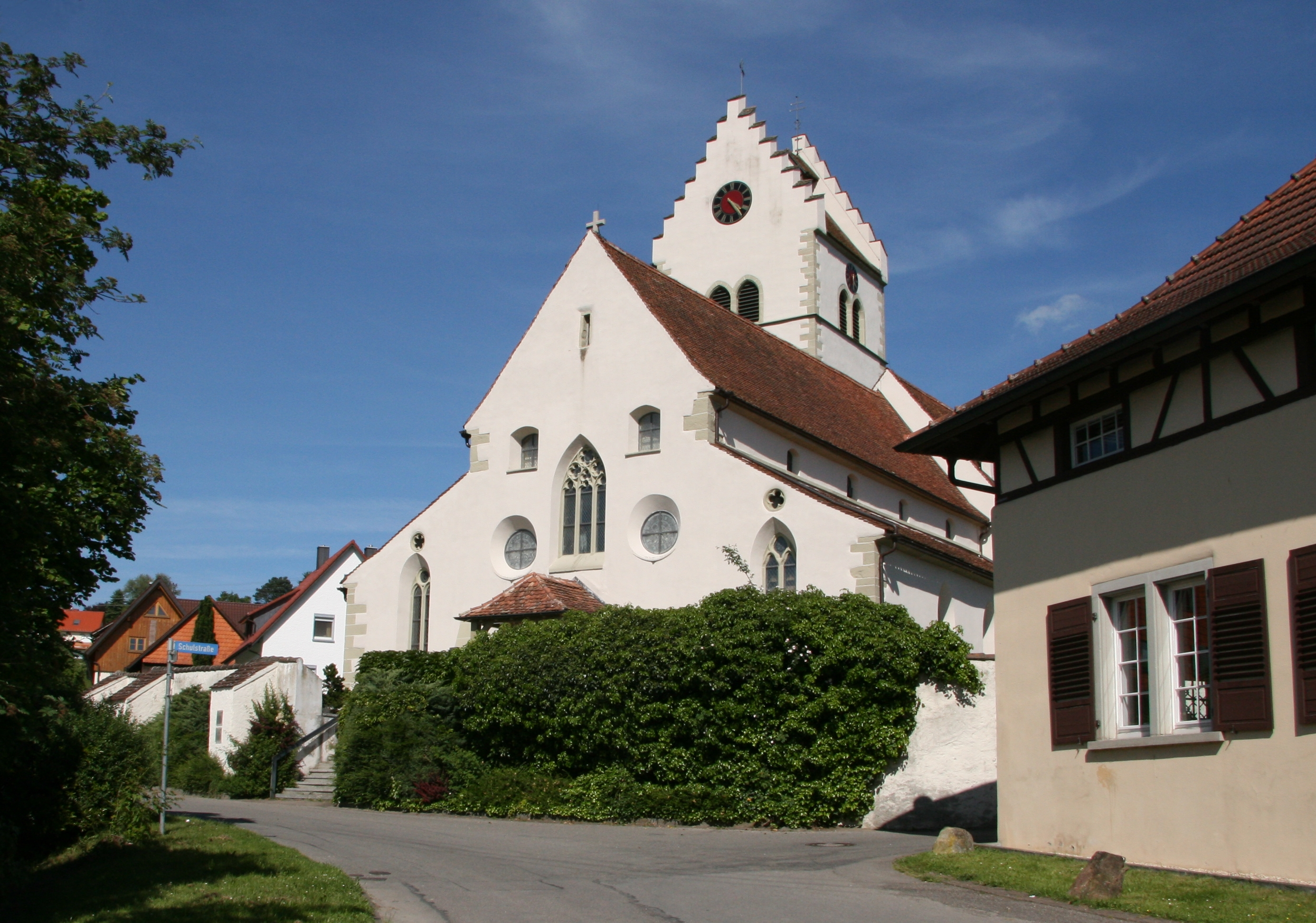
Saint George's church, Bermatingen
