= Illmensee =

German municipality

- Municipality
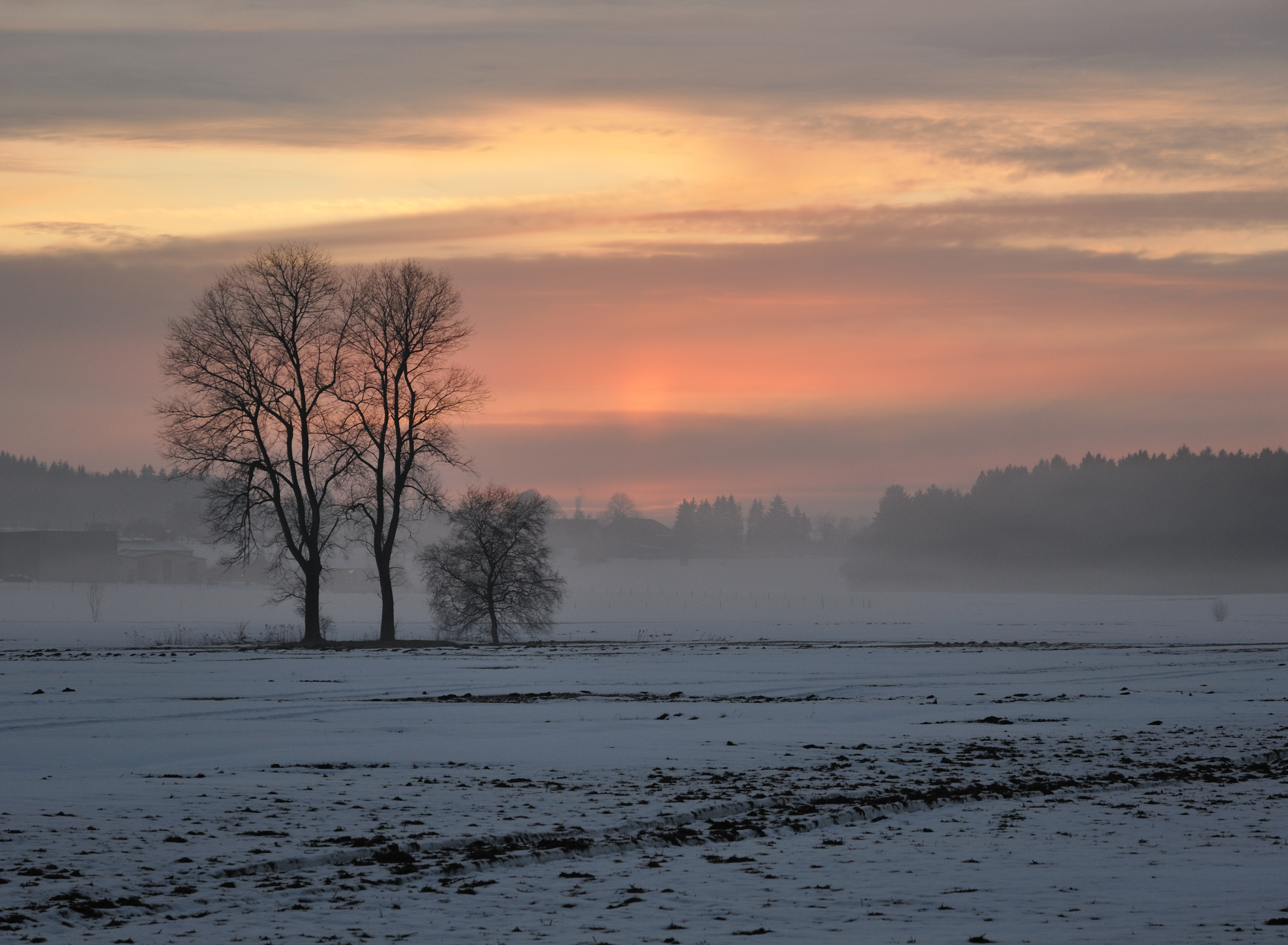
- Sunset on the Ruschweiler Lake

- Coat of arms

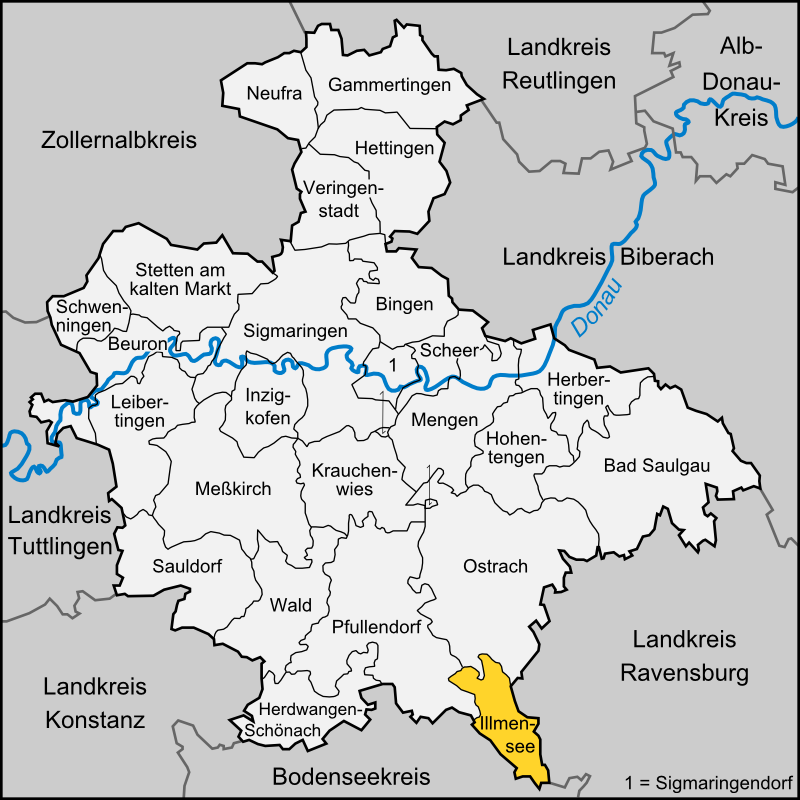
- Location of Illmensee within Sigmaringen district
- Interactive map of Illmensee
- Location within Germany Location within Baden-Württemberg
- Coordinates: 47°51′40″N 9°22′23″E
- Country: Germany
- State: Baden-Württemberg
- Admin. region: Tübingen
- District: Sigmaringen

Area
  - Total: 24.92 km^{2} (9.62 sq mi)
- Elevation: 692 m (2,270 ft)

Population (2025-12-31)
  - Total: 2,005
  - Density: 80.46/km^{2} (208.4/sq mi)
- Time zone: UTC+01:00 (CET)
  - Summer (DST): UTC+02:00 (CEST)
- Postal codes: 88636
- Dialling codes: 07558
- Vehicle registration: SIG
- Website: www.illmensee.de

Illmensee is a municipality of the district of Sigmaringen in Baden-Württemberg, Germany.

== History ==
Illmensee was mediatized to the Grand Duchy of Baden in 1803, whose government assigned the township to the district of Pfullendorf. It was reassigned in 1843 to the district of Heiligenberg, which was dissolved in 1938 into the district of Überlingen. Illmensee expanded dramatically after World War II, particularly in the 1960s, when the municipality industrialized. In 1973, as part of that year's reform of Baden-Württemberg's administrative structure, the district of Überlingen was merged into a new one based at Sigmaringen.

== Geography ==
The municipality (Gemeinde) of Illmensee is situated at the southeastern corner of the district of Sigmaringen, in the German state of Baden-Württemberg. Illmensee lies along Sigmaringen's border with the district of Ravensburg to the east and the Bodensee district to the south. The municipality is physically located in a depression formed by the Würm glaciation in the Upper Swabian hill country. The municipality's three lakes, the Illmensee itself, Ruschweiler, and the Volzer lakes, are glacial lakes that were also formed by the Würm glaciation. Elevation above sea level in the municipal area ranges from a high of 833 meters (2,733 ft) Normalnull (NN) to a low of 667 meters (2,188 ft) NN.

The Federally-protected Ruschweiler and Volzer Lakes nature reserve is located in Illmensee's municipal area.

== Politics ==
Illmensee has three boroughs (Ortsteile): Illmensee, Illwanger, and Ruschweiler.

=== Coat of arms ===
Illmensee's coat of arms depicts a white fish leaping over a yellow, three-pointed hill upon a field of red. The coat of arms was taken from the House of Irmensee, a noble family that went extinct in Switzerland in 1591.

== Transport ==
Local public transport is provided by the Verkehrsverbund Neckar-Alb-Donau. The municipality has since 2009 been a member of the Bodensee-Oberschwaben Verkehrsverbund.
