= Oberteuringen =

- Municipality
- Coat of arms

- Location of Oberteuringen within Bodenseekreis district
- Interactive map of Oberteuringen
- Location within Germany Location within Baden-Württemberg
- Coordinates: 47°43′30″N 09°28′15″E
- Country: Germany
- State: Baden-Württemberg
- Admin. region: Tübingen
- District: Bodenseekreis

Government
  - Mayor (2017–25): Ralf Meßmer (Ind.)

Area
  - Total: 20.08 km^{2} (7.75 sq mi)
- Elevation: 451 m (1,480 ft)

Population (2025-12-31)
  - Total: 5,056
  - Density: 251.8/km^{2} (652.1/sq mi)
- Time zone: UTC+01:00 (CET)
  - Summer (DST): UTC+02:00 (CEST)
- Postal codes: 88094
- Dialling codes: 07546
- Vehicle registration: FN
- Website: www.oberteuringen.de

Oberteuringen (German pronunciation: [ˈoːbɐˌtɔʏʁɪŋən]; Low Alemannic: Direnge) is a town in the district of Bodensee in Baden-Württemberg, south-west Germany.

It lies some 8 km north of the Bodensee (Lake Constance) and 4 km east of Mount Gehrenberg. Nearby towns are Markdorf (6 km), Friedrichshafen (7 km), Tettnang (11 km), and Ravensburg (12 km).

The Oberteuringen council district includes the villages of Bibruck, Bitzenhofen, Hefigkofen, Neuhaus, Rammetshofen, Remette, Unterteuringen, and Vittenhaag.

== Demographics ==
Population development:

Year	Inhabitants
1990	3,671
2001	4,100
2011	4,432
2021	5,004
