= Illmensee (lake) =

Lake in Germany

- Location within Baden-Württemberg Location within Germany
- Location: Illmensee, Sigmaringen, Baden-Württemberg, Germany
- Coordinates: 47°51′17″N 9°22′50″E
- Type: lake

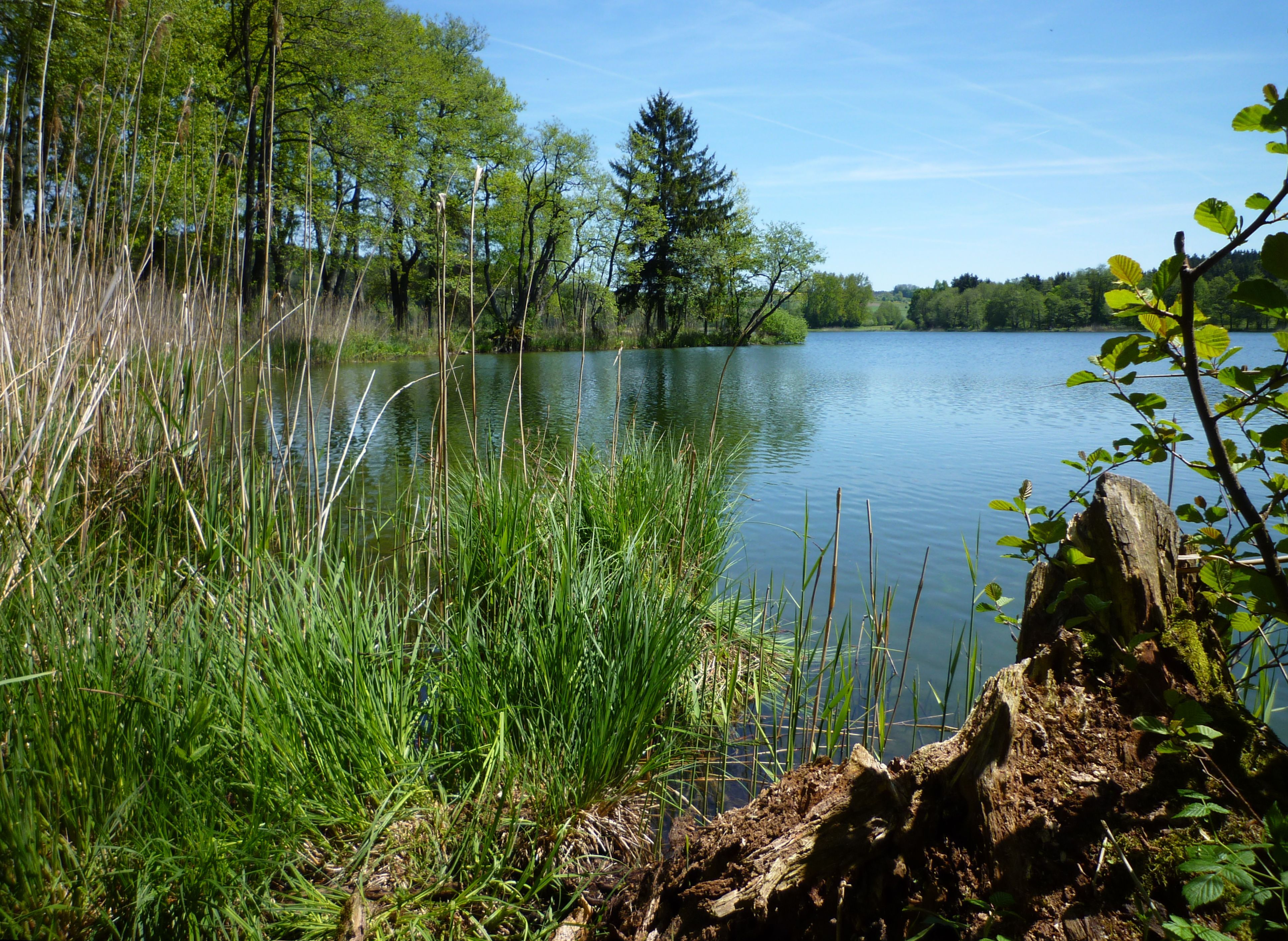
Illmensee view on south bank, Totholz

The Illmensee is a lake southeast of the municipality of Illmensee in the district of Sigmaringen in Baden-Württemberg, Germany.

== Geography ==
A weir was built at the lake, which soon became an obstacle for the fish to travel. This was intentional, so fishers and fishing clubs would be able to catch them.

Since 1937, the water table has decreased by 1.3 metres.

== History ==
=== Ancient history ===
Multiple Neolithic pile dwellings have been found around the lake. They are located in the shallow water area of the west bank and on the east bank up to about ten meters from the tip of the peninsula, which is about 300 meters long, on average 25 to 30 meters wide and made up of up to seven meters thick layers of chalk.

== Resort ==
The lake of Illmensee was first mentioned in a document in 1275 and has been a state-recognised resort since 1987. It has a swimming pontoon, diving platform, modern playground, beach volleyball court, kiosk, and a herb garden.
