= Auf de schwäbsche Eisebahne =

1850 German traditional song

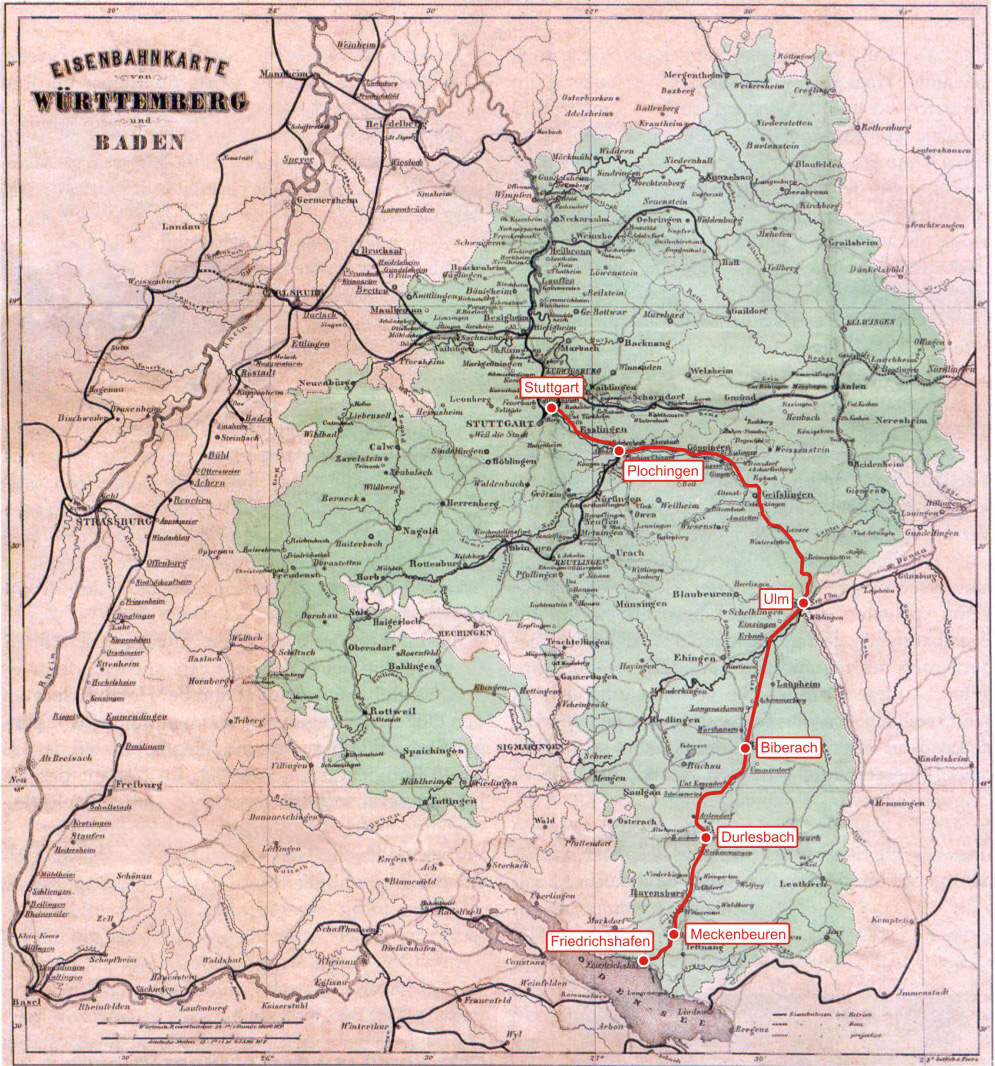
Map showing the train stations mentioned in the song

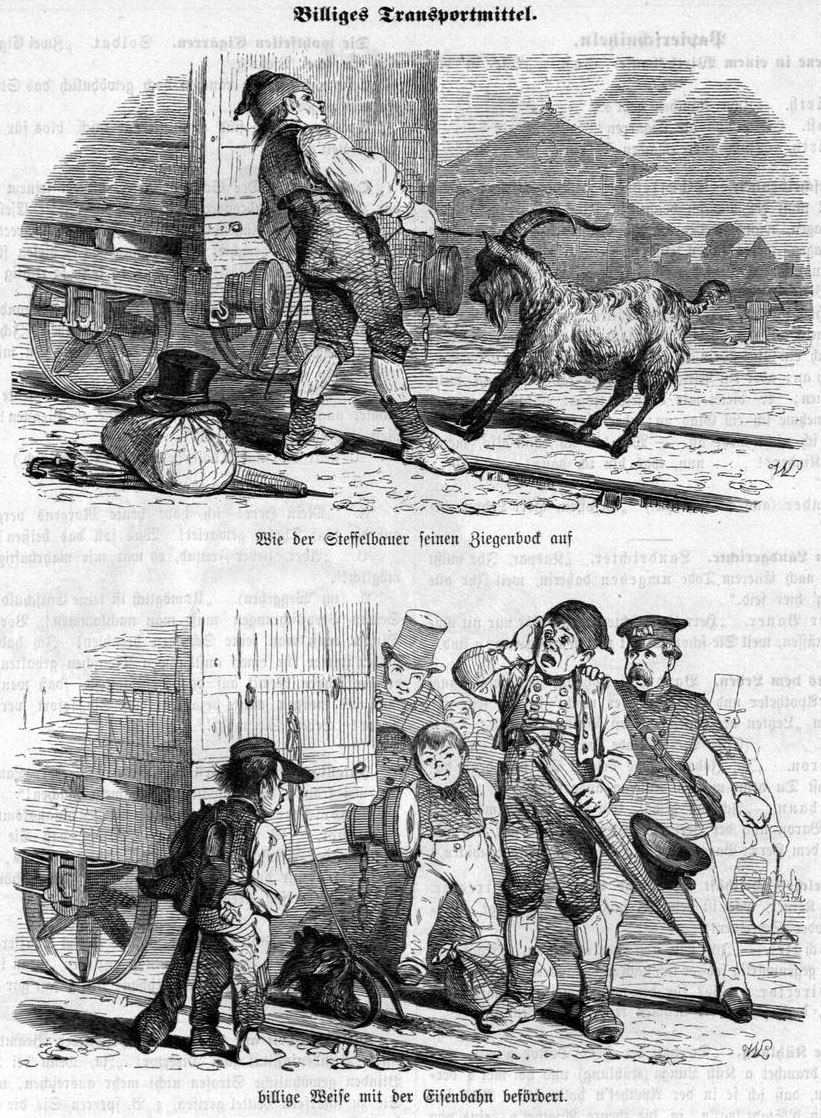
Depiction in Fliegende Blätter of 1853

Auf de schwäbsche Eisebahne ("On the Swabian Railway") is a German Volkslied from Württemberg. It contrasts the rural and frugal country folk travelling on the modern reality of railways.

Following rail stations are mentioned: Stuttgart Hauptbahnhof, Ulm Hauptbahnhof, Biberach, Meckenbeuren and Durlesbach.

Worte und Weise: Volkslied aus Schwaben um 1853
