= Salem Abbey =

Former Cistercian monastery in Germany

- German: Kloster Salem
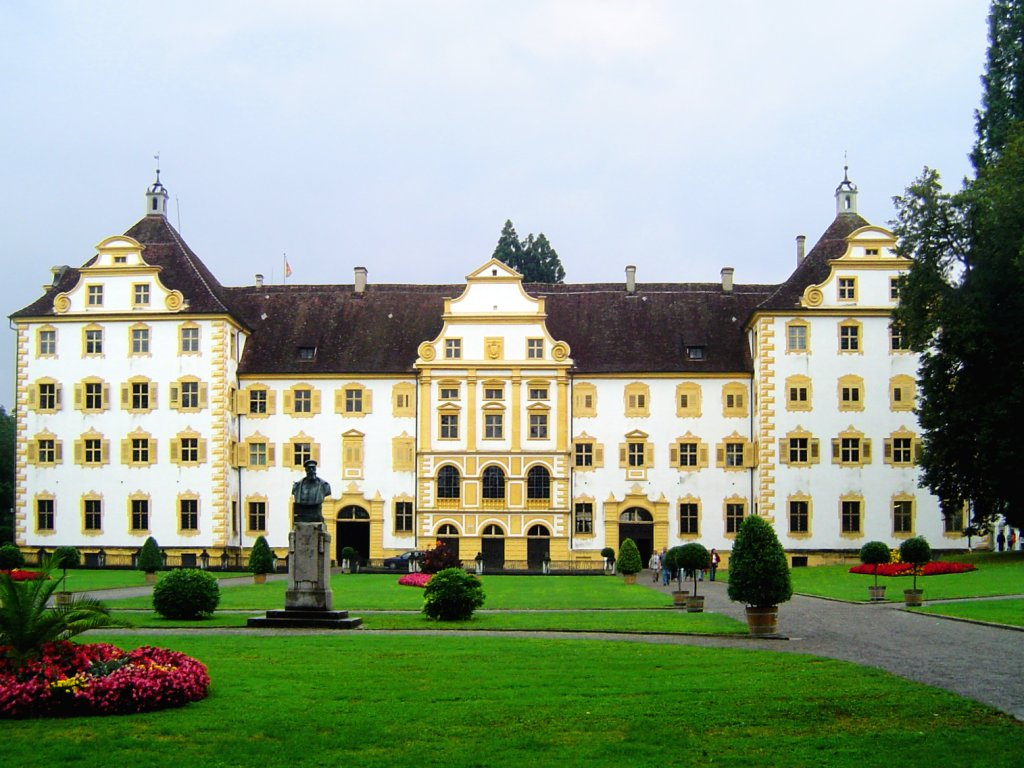
- North-eastern aspect of Salem Abbey
Location map and basic information
General information
Location	Salem, Baden-Württemberg, Germany
Coordinates	47°46′34″N 9°16′46″E

Website
- www.salem.de

Salem Abbey (German: Kloster Salem) was a very prominent Cistercian monastery at Salem in the district of Bodensee, about ten miles from Konstanz in Baden-Württemberg, Germany. The buildings are now owned by the State of Baden-Württemberg and are open for tours as the Salem Monastery and Palace.

== History ==
Imperial Abbey of Salem Reichsabtei Salem
- 1155–1803
- Coat of arms

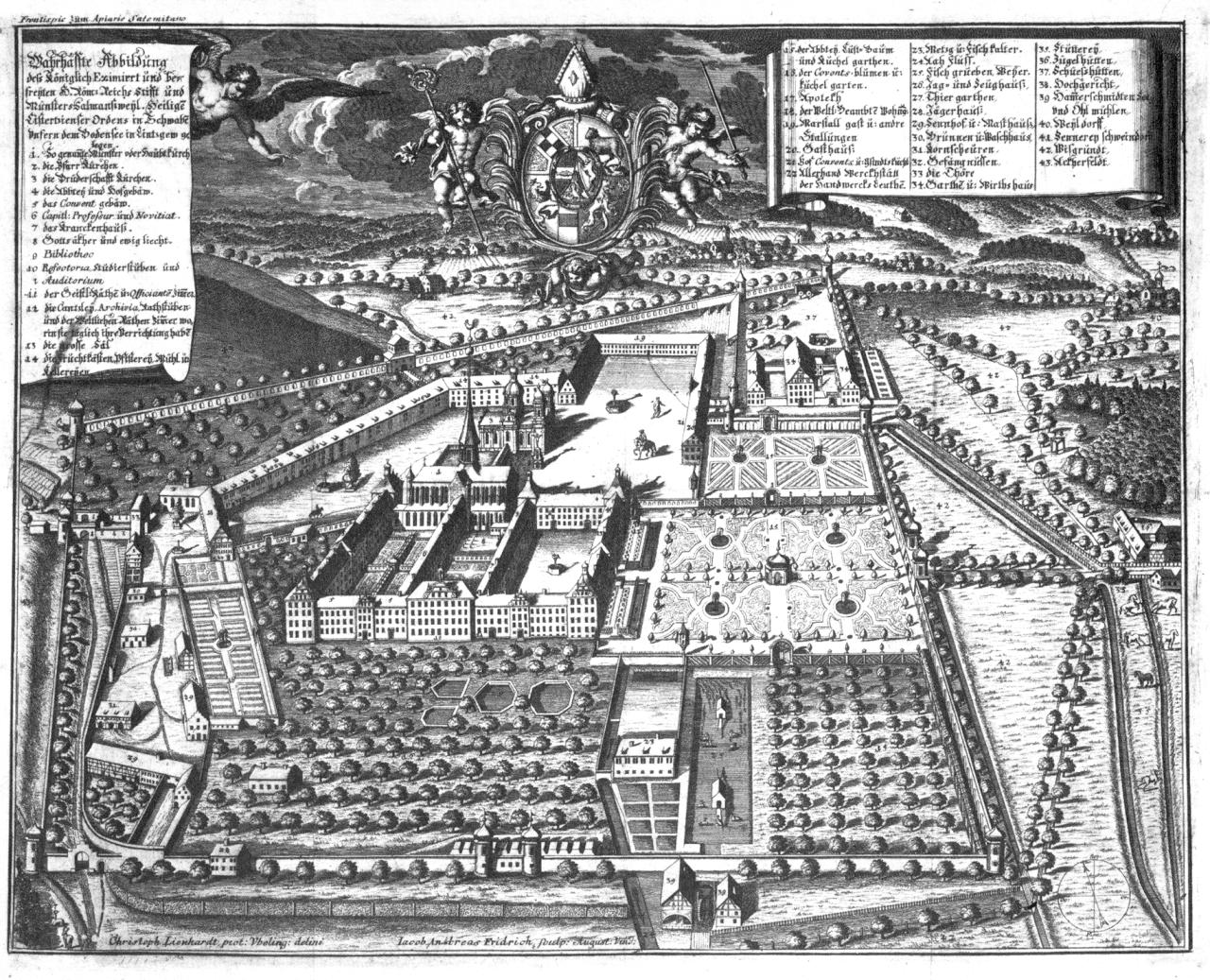
- Salem Abbey, c. 1708
- Status: Imperial Abbey
- History
  - Abbey founded: 1137
  - Gained immediacy: 1155
  - Mediatized to Baden: 1803
Preceded by	Succeeded by
Duchy of Swabia	Margraviate of Baden

In 1134, a knight named Guntram von Adelsreute, inspired by a sermon held by Bernard of Clairvaux at the Konstanz Minster, donated an estate in the Linzgau region to Bernard's monastic order, the Cistercians. That estate, called the Salmannsweiler, had an area of about 200 hectares (490 acres) and was too small to support a monastery. Regardless, in 1137 a party of 12 monks were sent from Lucelle Abbey, in Alsace. These monks combined existing farms with further donations from Guntram in 1138 that gave the new monastery a stable economic base. Its abbot, Frowin, a friend of Bernard, named the monastery Salem, likely as an allusion to Jerusalem.

The foundation of the abbey was confirmed by Linzgau nobility led by the Count of Heiligenberg in 1138, and again in 1140 by Frederick II, Duke of Swabia, and Pope Innocent II and once more in 1142 by Conrad III, King of Germany. Finally, in 1155, Frederick I, Holy Roman Emperor, granted Salem imperial immediacy, making it an imperial abbey, and took the abbey under his personal patronage. Salem Abbey profited greatly from the patronage of Frederick's house, the Hohenstaufen, and its territory rapidly expanded through donations and purchases. This rapid growth brought Salem into contention with the Bishop of Constance and with local nobility and peasantry. Under Abbot Eberhard von Rohrdorf, however, the monastery continued to expand and secured the protection of the Archbishop of Salzburg in 1201. The Archbishop of Salzburg also gave a saltwork at Hallein to Salem for it to export salt across Lake Constance and further enrich the abbey.

With the beginning of the Great Interregnum in the mid-13th century and the loss of Hohenstaufen protection, Salem began to decline as its possessions were attacked by local rivals and was driven into debt. Salem's situation improved with the election of Rudolf I as King of Germany and the creation of the Landvogtei Schwaben at the end of the century, which aligned Salem with the House of Habsburg. That alignment brought more attacks on Salem in 1314, led by the Counts of Werdenberg to Heiligenberg, that lasted until Emperor Charles IV granted Salem further political exemptions.

By 1300, 300 choir monks and lay brothers inhabited Salem.

=== Second abbey ===
From 1615 to 1620, Abbot Thomas I demolished the medieval monastery buildings to construct a new complex. In 1697, every building of the monastery complex except its church was destroyed by fire.

The abbey saw renewed prosperity during the 18th century, however, and it was able to rebuild.

=== Secularization ===
In 1802, as part of the process of German mediatization, Salem Abbey was ceded to the Margraviate of Baden by Napoleon to compensate Baden for territories on the Left Bank of the Rhine that had been annexed into France.

In 1920, Prince Maximilian of Baden and the educator Kurt Hahn established the Schule Schloss Salem on the grounds of the abbey.

The House of Baden sold most of the abbey's grounds to the State of Baden-Württemberg in 2009.

== Grounds and architecture ==
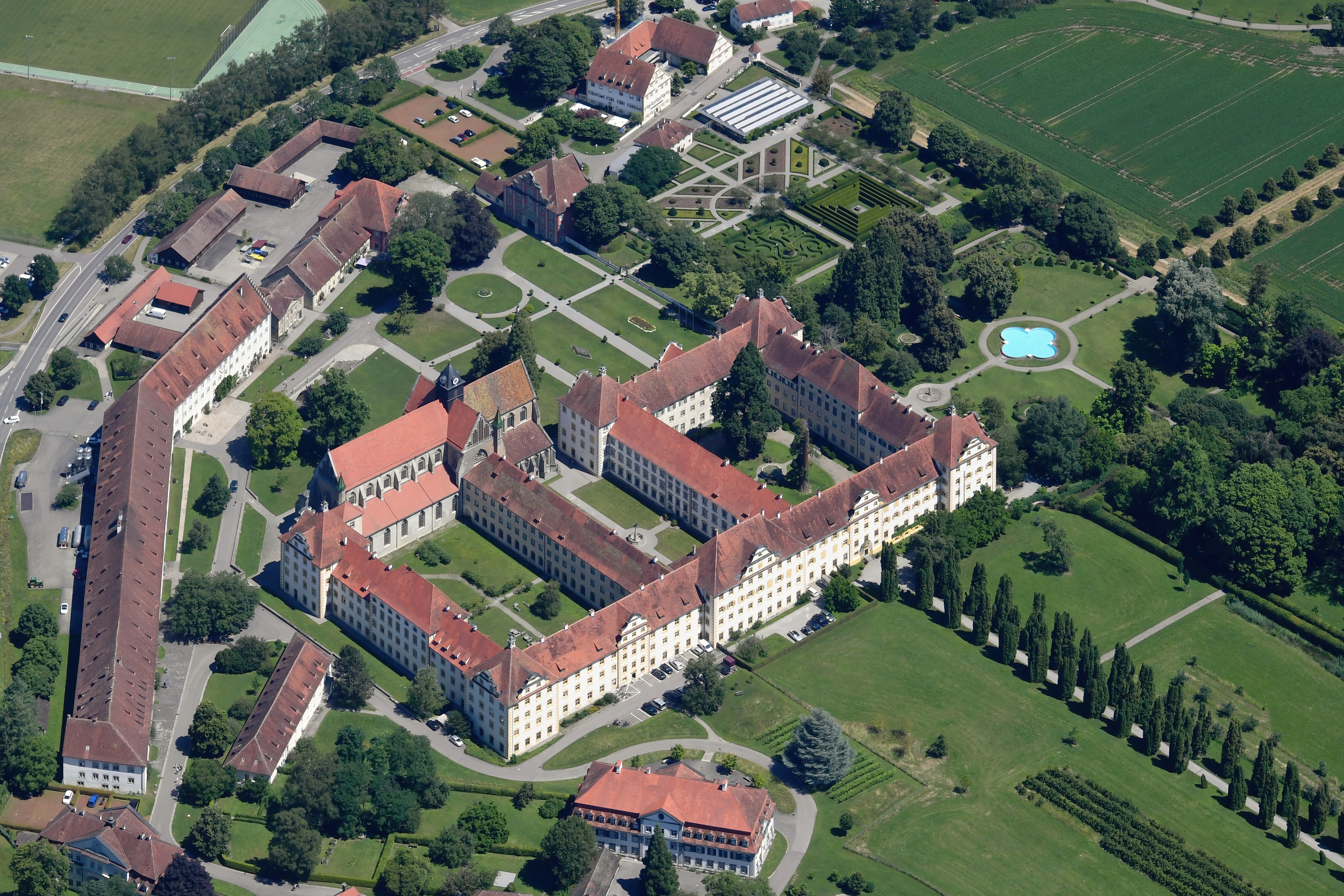
Aerial view of Salem Abbey

A wall was built to enclose the monastery complex around the year 1300. The northern edge of the extant monastery is made up by service buildings that house a stable, mill, bakery, blacksmithy, prison, and also include a wine cellar and a tithe barn.

The ceilings of the rebuilt cloister are adorned with stucco and frescoes depicting the life of Bernard of Clairvaux.

=== Salem Minster ===
Construction of the Salem Minster building (the church of the abbey complex) began in 1299. It was not finished until 1414, when the Archbishop of Salzburg consecrated it.

=== Palace ===
Before the abbey was secularized, the Prälatur was the residence of Salem's abbots. Afterwards, it was a residence of the House of Baden.
