= Meckenbeuren =

- Municipality
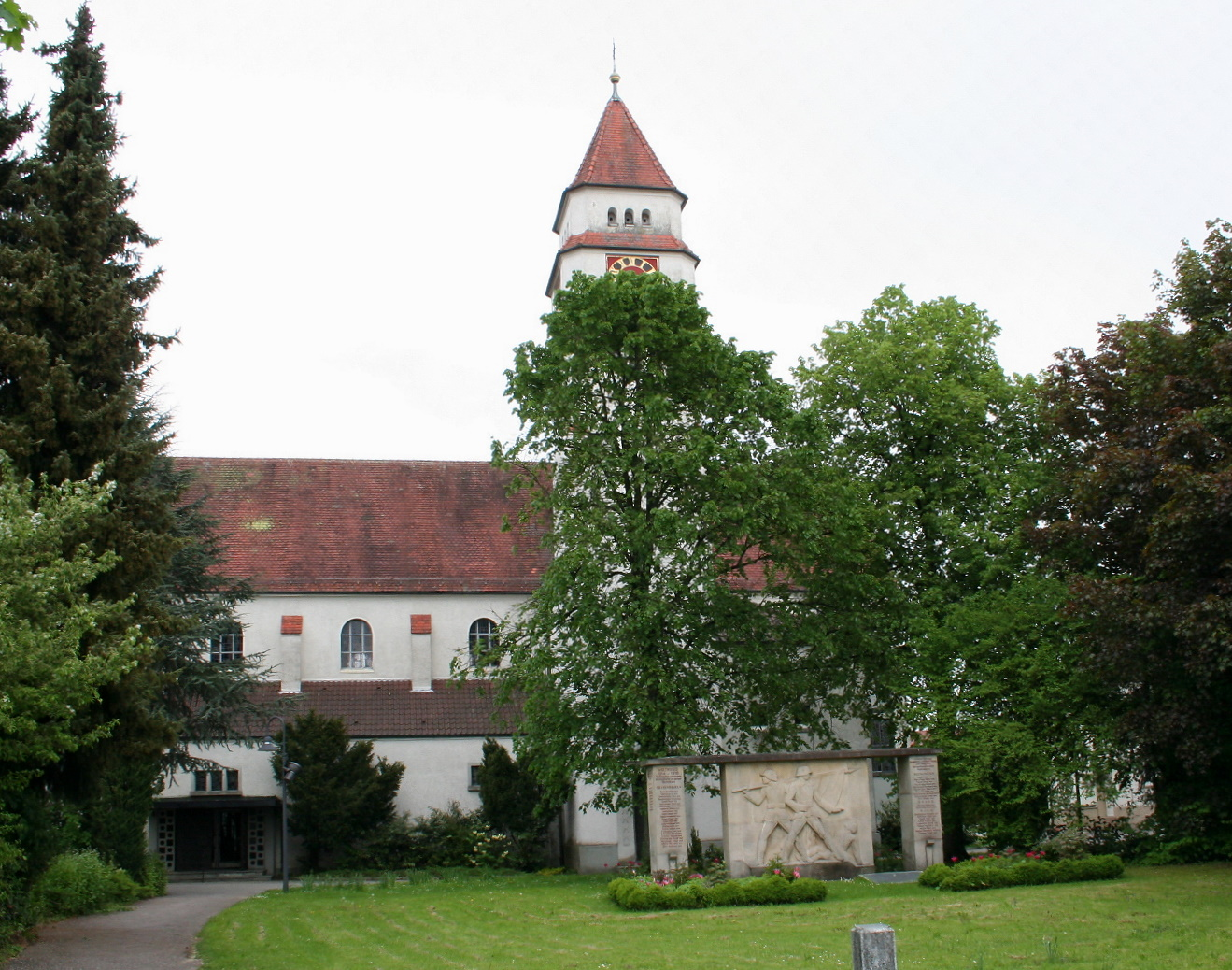
- Church of St. Mary

- Coat of arms

- Location of Meckenbeuren within Bodenseekreis district
- Interactive map of Meckenbeuren
- Location within Germany Location within Baden-Württemberg
- Coordinates: 47°42′00″N 09°33′45″E
- Country: Germany
- State: Baden-Württemberg
- Admin. region: Tübingen
- District: Bodenseekreis

Government
  - Mayor (2022–30): Georg Schellinger

Area
  - Total: 31.89 km^{2} (12.31 sq mi)
- Elevation: 435 m (1,427 ft)

Population (2025-12-31)
  - Total: 13,717
  - Density: 430.1/km^{2} (1,114/sq mi)
- Time zone: UTC+01:00 (CET)
  - Summer (DST): UTC+02:00 (CEST)
- Postal codes: 88074
- Dialling codes: 07542
- Vehicle registration: FN
- Website: www.meckenbeuren.de

Meckenbeuren (German pronunciation: [ˈmɛkn̩ˌbɔʏʁən]) is a municipality in the Bodensee district, in Baden-Württemberg, Southern Germany. It is located 10 kilometres (6 miles) south of Ravensburg, and 8 kilometres (5 miles) northeast of Friedrichshafen, on Lake Constance.

== Geography ==
=== Location ===
Meckenbeuren is located about eight kilometres north of Friedrichshafen and ten kilometres south of Ravensburg in the lower Schussental valley near Lake Constance.

Friedrichshafen Airport is partially located on Meckenbeuren (Gerbertshaus) territory.

=== Districts ===
The municipality of Meckenbeuren includes, in addition to the core town of Obermeckenbeuren (since 1810), the former municipalities incorporated in 1937 and today's districts of Brochenzell and Liebenau (with the hamlets of Brugg, Hegenberg, Hirschach, Knellesberg, Langentrog, Schwarzenbach, Senglingen and Weiler, the farms of Berg, Buch, Furt, Hasenwinkel, Hohenreute, Holzbauer, Hungersberg, Kratzerach, Laufenen, Lohner, Madenreute, Mühlebach, Ottmarsreute, Rebholz, Regulator, Reuter, Sandgrub, Stengele, Straß, Untertennennenmoos and the houses Habacht) as well as the village of Kehlen, which was incorporated in 1972 (with the villages Kehlen and Reute, the hamlets of Buch, Gerbertshaus, Gunzenhaus, Holzreute, Lochbrücke, Sammletshofen, Sassen, Schürten, Schuppenwies, Sibratshaus and Siglishofen, the courtyards Großbuch, Hechelfurt and Schindelhof as well as the houses Schübelbeer).

== Demographics ==
Population development:

Year	Inhabitants
1990	11,182
2001	12,939
2011	13,109
2021	13,651

== Main sights ==
- Ravensburger Spieleland: a 25 hectare amusement park in the Liebenau district
- Humpismuseum (Humpis Museum) in the Humpisschloss (Humpis Castle) in the Brochenzell district

== Culture ==
- This rail station is mentioned in the Volkslied Auf de schwäbsche Eisebahne.

=== Gallery ===
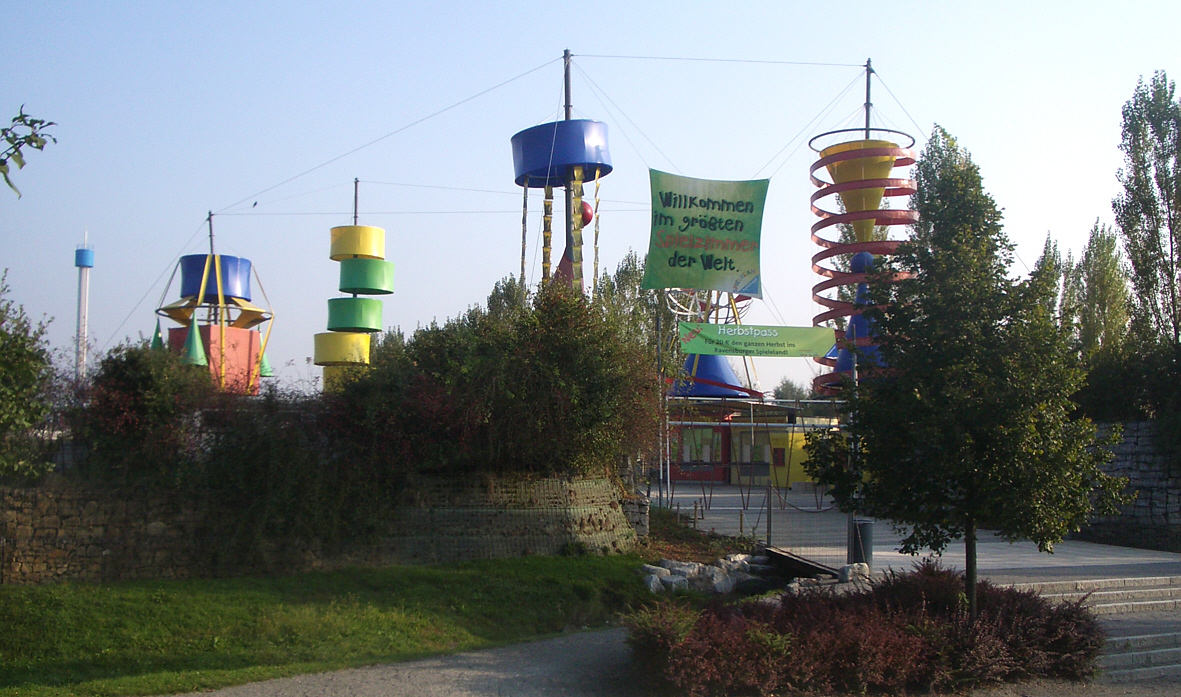
Ravensburger Spieleland (amusement park)

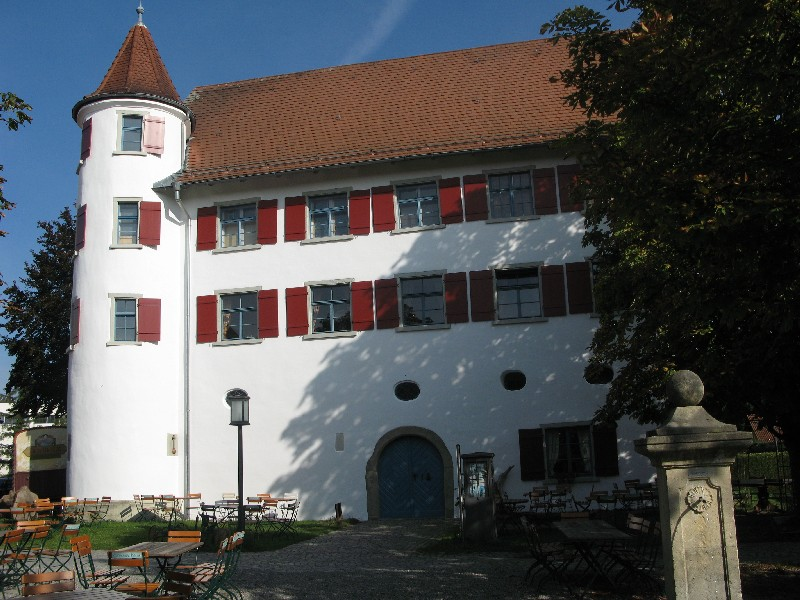
Humpisschloss in the Brochenzell district

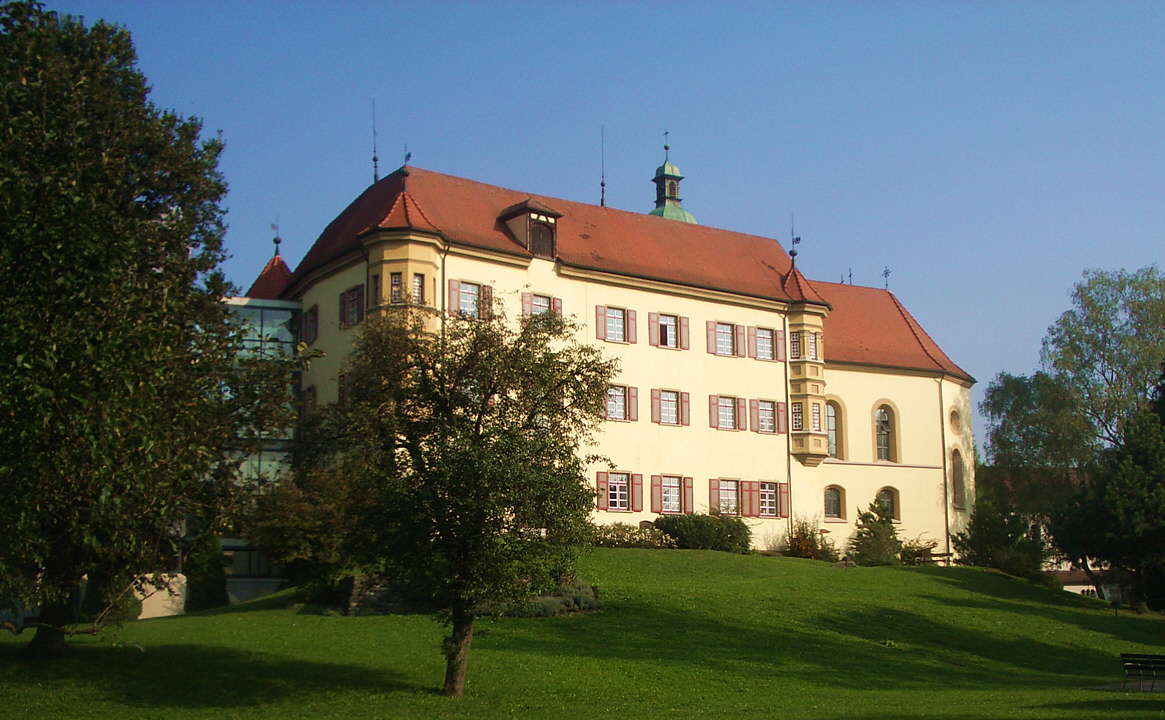
Schloss Liebenau (Liebenau Castle; since 1870, a Catholic nursing home and a school for nurses)

== Twin cities ==
- Hohwald, Germany, since 1991
- Kehlen, Luxembourg, since 1993
