= Deggenhausen =

Coordinates: 47°48′8″N 9°23′0″E

- Town
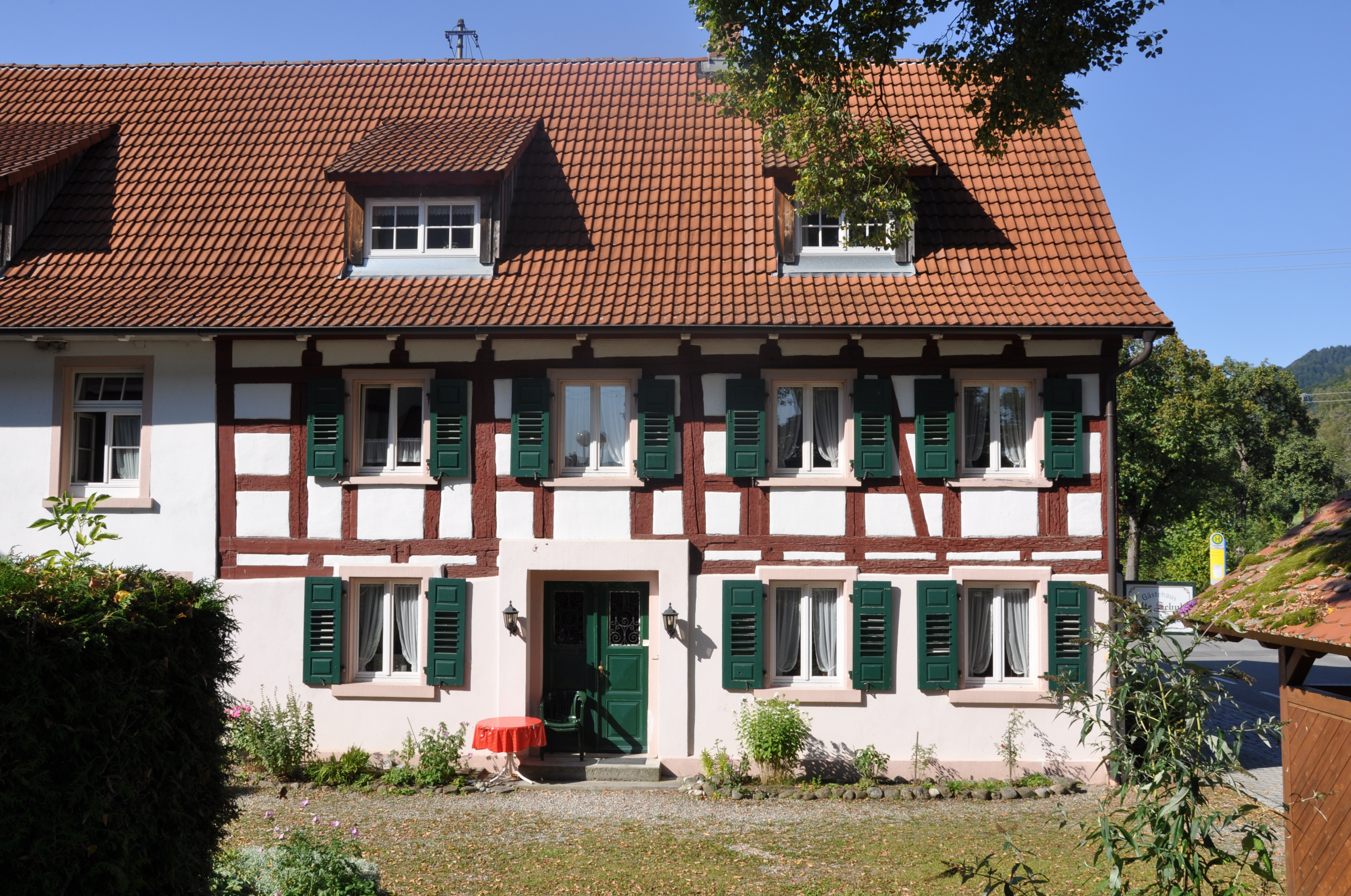

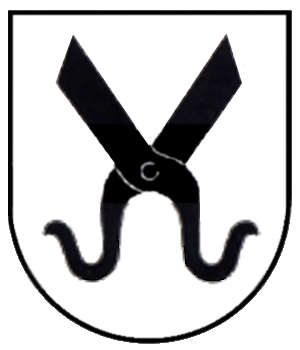
- Coat of arms
- Interactive map of Deggenhausen
- Country: Germany
- State: Baden-Württemberg
- Commune: Deggenhausertal
- District: Bodenseekreis

Deggenhausen is a town in the commune Deggenhausertal in Baden-Württemberg Germany. Deggenhausertal itself is a part of the district Bodenseekreis which is on the north shore of Lake Constanz.

== Geography ==
Deggenhausen is located in valley, alongside the small river of the Deggenhauser Ach, about 8 km east southeast of Heiligenberg. The municipality of Deggenhausen also includes the villages Ellenfurt and Obersiggingen.

== History ==
Located northeast of the village was an eponymous castle, the ancestral home of the House of Deggenhausen which has been attested to the period 1137–1314. After the Deggenhausen family became extinct, the region passed to the Lords of Markdorf, who later sold it to the Prince-Bishopric of Constance. In 1483 the prince-bishopric in turn sold the region to the Counts of Werdenberg-Heiligenberg. After the extinction of the line Werdenberg-Heiligenberg-Sigmaringen-Trochtelfingen in 1534, Deggenhausen passed to the Counts of Fürstenberg.

In 1806 Fürstenberg was mediatised by the Grand Duchy of Baden.

== Coat of arms ==
The coat of arms display black shears on a white field. These are taken from the arms of the Lords of Deggenhausen who were ruled from Deggenhausen until the 14th century, though with the coloration of black and white to match the arms of the Counts of Heiligenberg. The arms were adopted in 1899. The arms form the main part of the arms of the commune Deggerhausertal.
