= Kressbronn am Bodensee =

- Municipality
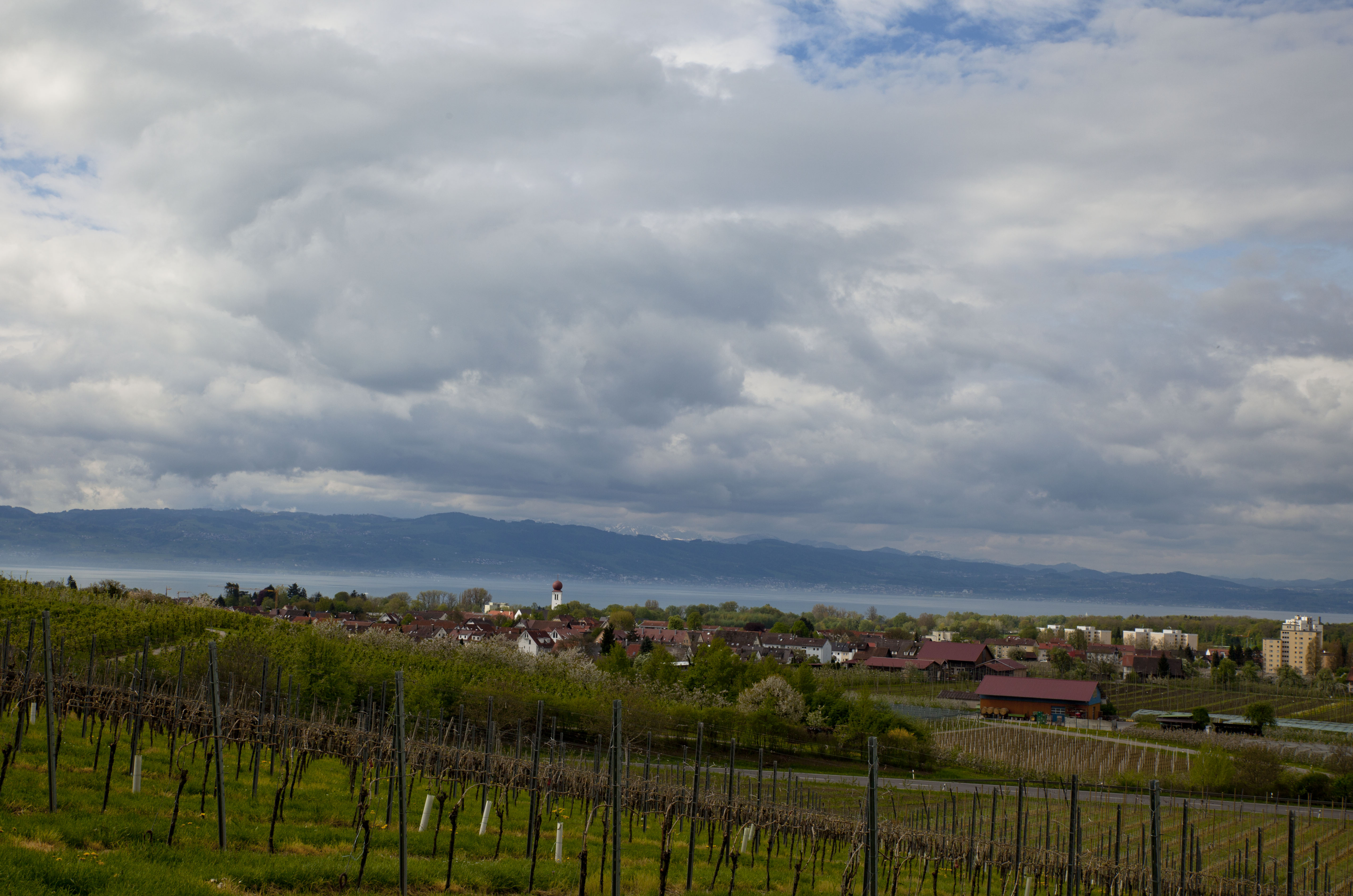
- Kressbronn am Bodensee

- Coat of arms

- Location of Kressbronn am Bodensee within Bodenseekreis district
- Interactive map of Kressbronn am Bodensee
- Location within Germany Location within Baden-Württemberg
- Coordinates: 47°35′45″N 09°36′00″E
- Country: Germany
- State: Baden-Württemberg
- Admin. region: Tübingen
- District: Bodenseekreis

Government
  - Mayor (2022–30): Daniel Enzensperger (CDU)

Area
  - Total: 20.42 km^{2} (7.88 sq mi)
- Elevation: 438 m (1,437 ft)

Population (2025-12-31)
  - Total: 8,769
  - Density: 429.4/km^{2} (1,112/sq mi)
- Time zone: UTC+01:00 (CET)
  - Summer (DST): UTC+02:00 (CEST)
- Postal codes: 88079
- Dialling codes: 07543
- Vehicle registration: FN
- Website: www.kressbronn.de

Kressbronn am Bodensee is a municipality and a village in the district of Bodenseekreis in Baden-Württemberg in Germany. It lies on Lake Constance.

Between 1919 and 2011, Kressbronn was the site of the Bodan-Werft shipyard, which built many of the ferries and other vessels used on Lake Constance and other Alpine lakes.

The lawyer Nicolas Becker was born in Kressbronn am Bodensee in 1946.

== Demographics ==
Population development:

Year	Inhabitants
1990	7198
2001	7502
2011	8250
2021	8600
