= Eriskirch =

German municipality

- Municipality
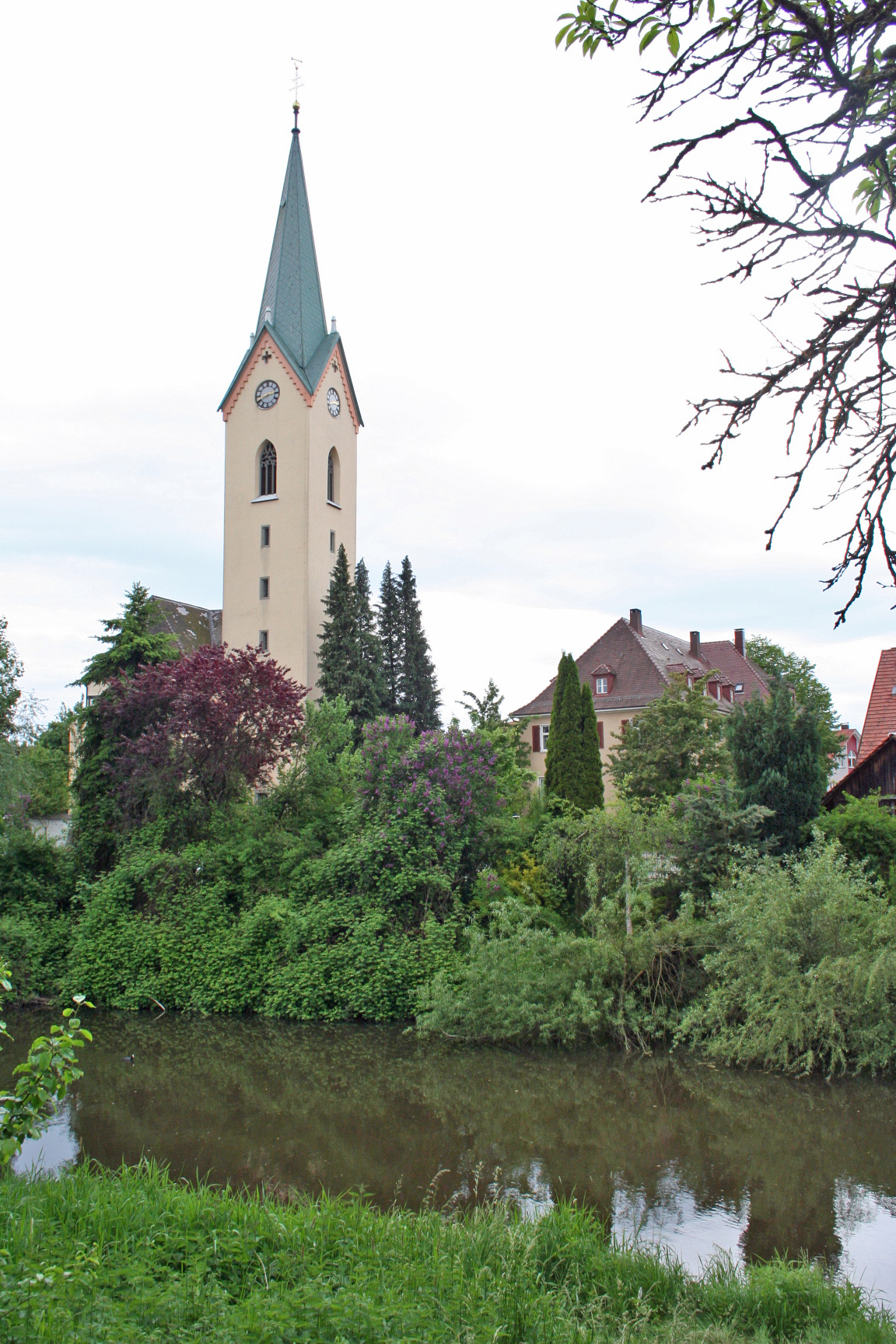
- Catholic parish church, Eriskirch

- Coat of arms

- Location of Eriskirch within Bodenseekreis district
- Interactive map of Eriskirch
- Location within Germany Location within Baden-Württemberg
- Coordinates: 47°37′45″N 09°31′45″E
- Country: Germany
- State: Baden-Württemberg
- Admin. region: Tübingen
- District: Bodenseekreis

Area
  - Total: 14.58 km^{2} (5.63 sq mi)
- Elevation: 400 m (1,300 ft)

Population (2025-12-31)
  - Total: 4,752
  - Density: 325.9/km^{2} (844.1/sq mi)
- Time zone: UTC+01:00 (CET)
  - Summer (DST): UTC+02:00 (CEST)
- Postal codes: 88097
- Dialling codes: 07541
- Vehicle registration: FN
- Website: www.eriskirch.de

Eriskirch is a municipality in the Bodensee district of Baden-Württemberg, Germany.

== History ==
Eriskirch was a possession of the Free City of Buchhorn (now Friedrichshafen) until it was annexed by the Electorate of Bavaria in 1803. In 1810, it was ceded to the Kingdom of Württemberg, whose government assigned the municipality to Oberamt Tettnang. That district was reformed in 1938 as Landkreis Tettnang, under whose jurisdiction Eriskirch remained. As part of the 1973 Baden-Württemberg district reform, Eriskirch was reassigned to the newly organized Bodensee district.

== Geography ==
The municipality (Gemeinde) of Eriskirch is found in the Bodensee district of Baden-Württemberg, one of the 16 States of the Federal Republic of Germany. Eriskirch lies at the southeast edge of the district, on the shores of Lake Constance, whose basin most characterizes the municipal area's landscape. The shore of Lake Constance within Eriskirch's municipal area is covered by an alluvial forest. Elevation above sea level in the municipal area ranges from a high of 421 meters (1,381 ft) Normalnull (NN) to a low of 391 meters (1,283 ft) NN by Lake Constance.

A portion of the Federally protected Eriskircher Ried nature reserve is located in Eriskirch's municipal area.

== Politics ==
Eriskirch has one borough, Eriskirch, and 16 villages: Braitenrain, Dillmannshof, Gmünd, Hofstatt, Knöbelhof, Langenacker, Mariabrunn, Moos, Oberbaumgarten, Röcken, Schlatt, Schoppenhof, Schussenreute, Unterbaumgarten, Wolfzennen, and Ziegelhaus. In addition, the abandoned villages of Adelshofen, Mönchloh, and Vogelsang are located in the municipal area.

=== Coat of arms ===
Eriskirch's coat of arms is divided in half party per pale into a left, blue and a right, yellow half. In the blue field is a fleur de lis, adopted as a municipal motif around 1936. Opposite it is a church, with white walls and a blue roof, referring to the name of the municipality. This coat of arms was awarded by the provisional post-World War II Württemberg-Hohenzollern government on 30 June 1952 and again by the Bodensee district office on 10 April 1981. Accompanying the second awarding was a municipal flag.
