= Frickingen =

- Municipality
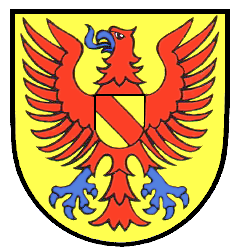
- Coat of arms

- Location of Frickingen within Bodenseekreis district
- Interactive map of Frickingen
- Location within Germany Location within Baden-Württemberg
- Coordinates: 47°48′45″N 09°16′15″E
- Country: Germany
- State: Baden-Württemberg
- Admin. region: Tübingen
- District: Bodenseekreis

Government
  - Mayor (2022–30): Jürgen Stukle

Area
  - Total: 26.43 km^{2} (10.20 sq mi)
- Elevation: 473 m (1,552 ft)

Population (2025-12-31)
  - Total: 3,106
  - Density: 117.5/km^{2} (304.4/sq mi)
- Time zone: UTC+01:00 (CET)
  - Summer (DST): UTC+02:00 (CEST)
- Postal codes: 88699
- Dialling codes: 07554
- Vehicle registration: FN
- Website: www.frickingen.de

Frickingen (German pronunciation: [ˈfʁɪkɪŋən]) is a municipality and a village in the district of Bodensee in Baden-Württemberg in Germany.
