= Höchsten =

Mountain in Baden-Württemberg, Germany

- Location within Baden-Württemberg

Highest point
- Elevation: 837.8 m (2,749 ft)
- Isolation: 37.53 km (23.32 mi) to Pfaffenbühl
- Coordinates: 47°49′08″N 09°24′08″E

Geography
- Location: Baden-Württemberg, Germany

Höchsten is a mountain of Baden-Württemberg, Germany. It is the highest mountain between Lake Constance and the River Danube, standing at approximately 838 meters above sea level.
