= Markdorf =

- Town
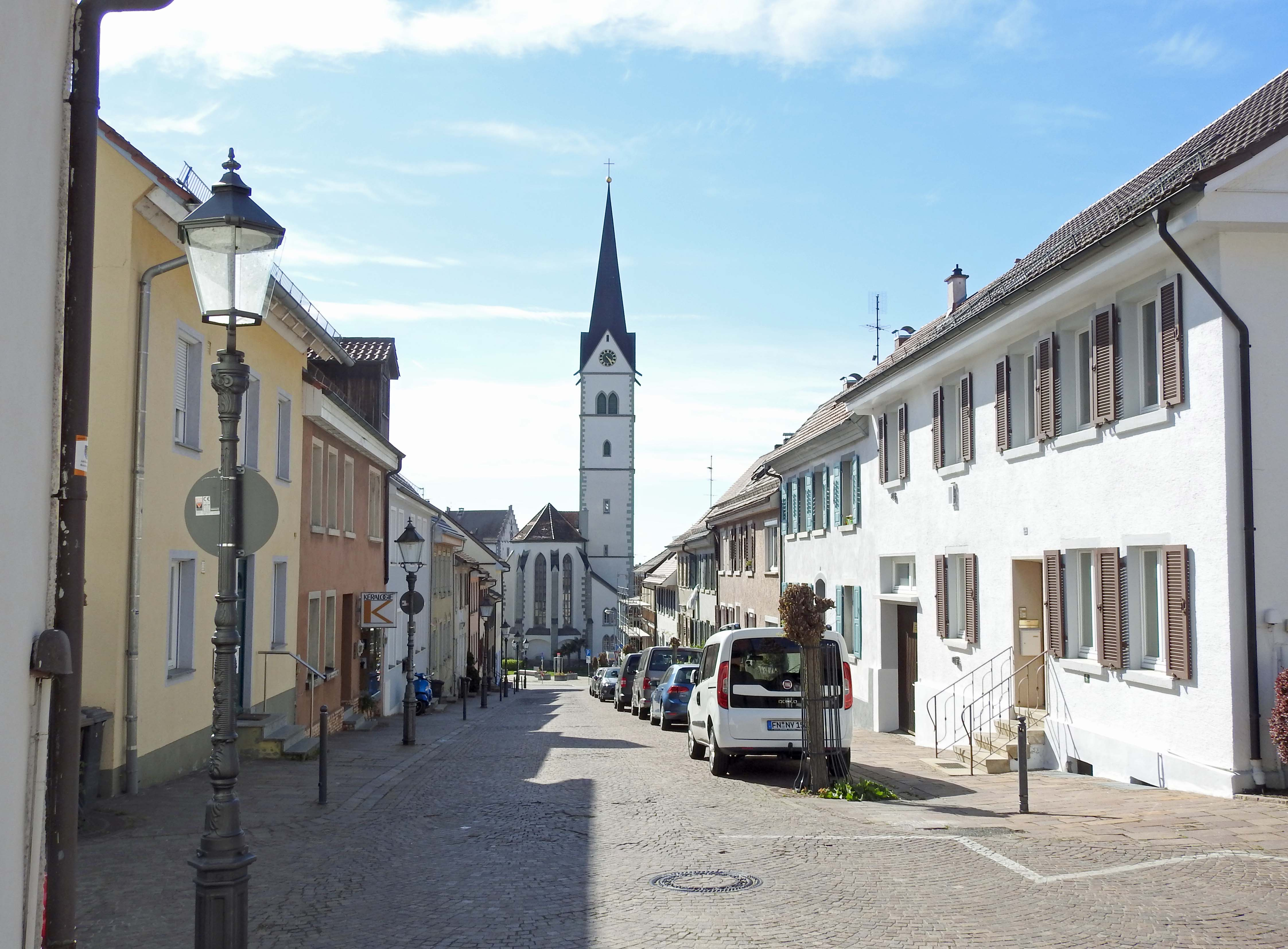

- Coat of arms

- Location of Markdorf within Bodenseekreis district
- Interactive map of Markdorf
- Location within Germany Location within Baden-Württemberg
- Coordinates: 47°43′15″N 09°23′30″E
- Country: Germany
- State: Baden-Württemberg
- Admin. region: Tübingen
- District: Bodenseekreis

Government
  - Mayor (2021–29): Georg Riedmann (CDU)

Area
  - Total: 40.91 km^{2} (15.80 sq mi)
- Elevation: 453 m (1,486 ft)

Population (2025-12-31)
  - Total: 14,305
  - Density: 349.7/km^{2} (905.6/sq mi)
- Time zone: UTC+01:00 (CET)
  - Summer (DST): UTC+02:00 (CEST)
- Postal codes: 88677
- Dialling codes: 07544
- Vehicle registration: FN
- Website: www.markdorf.de

Markdorf (German pronunciation: [ˈmaʁkdɔʁf]) is a town in the Bodenseekreis district, in Baden-Württemberg, Southern Germany. It is situated near Lake Constance, 10 km northwest of Friedrichshafen. Georg Riedmann has been the mayor of Markdorf since 2013.

Markdorf was first mentioned in AD 817 and it was given city rights in 1250. It was host to the Church Council prior to that body being moved to Konstanz.

Markdorf, with its historic centre, lies beneath the Gehrenberg mountain, on the top of which is a 30m high climbable tower affording views over Lake Constance and the Swiss, Austrian and German Alps.

On 22 December 1939, the location was near to a major train accident which resulted in the deaths of 101 people.
