= Gehrenberg =

Coordinates: 47°44′N 9°25′E

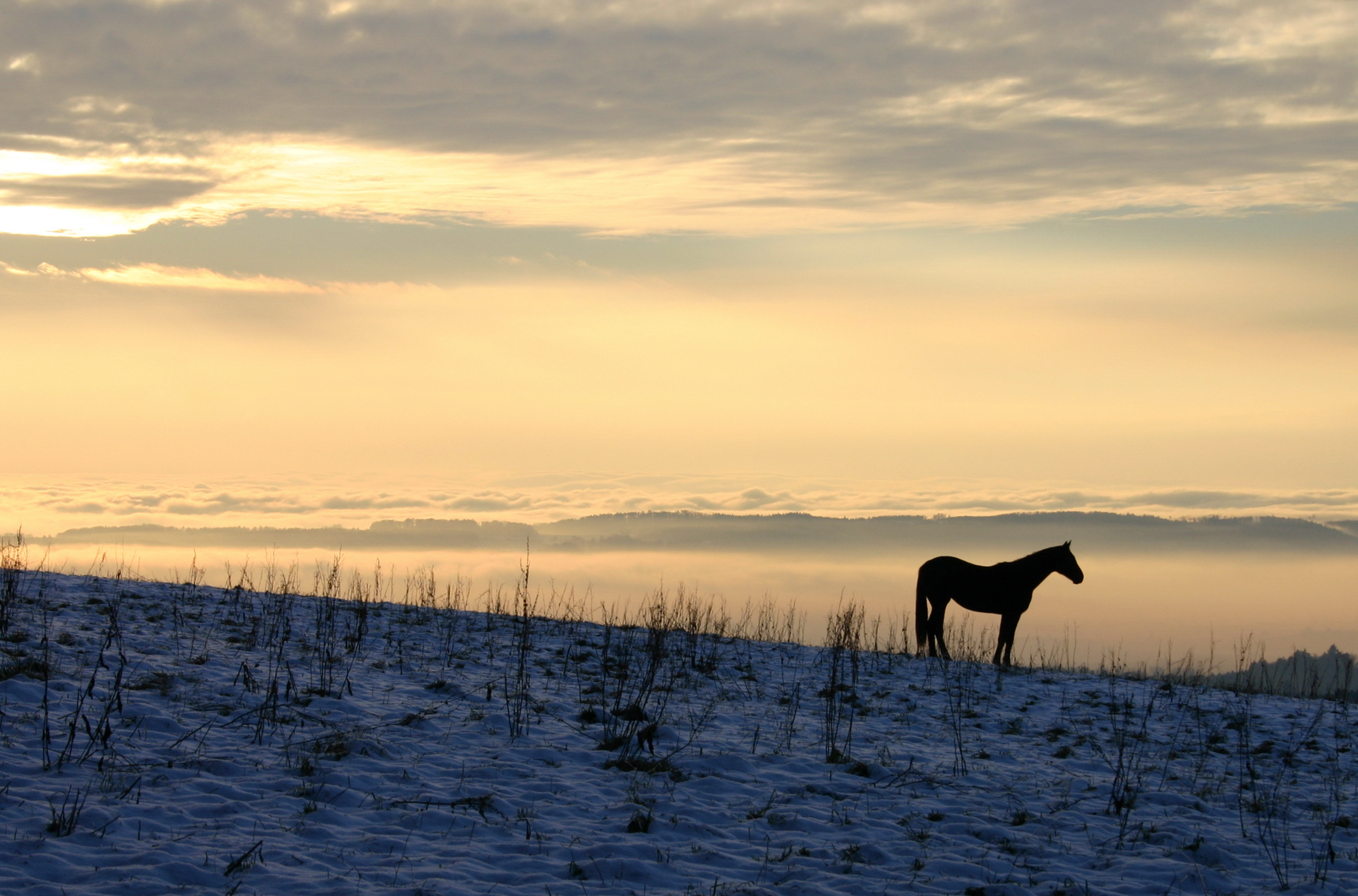
- Horse on the Gehrenberg, near Deggenhausertal-Wendlingen, Bodenseekreis.

Highest point
- Elevation: 754.3 m (2,475 ft)
- Isolation: 7.21 km (4.48 mi) to Höchsten

Geography
- Location: Baden-Württemberg, Germany

Gehrenberg is a mountain of Baden-Württemberg, Germany.
