= Heiligenberg =

- Municipality
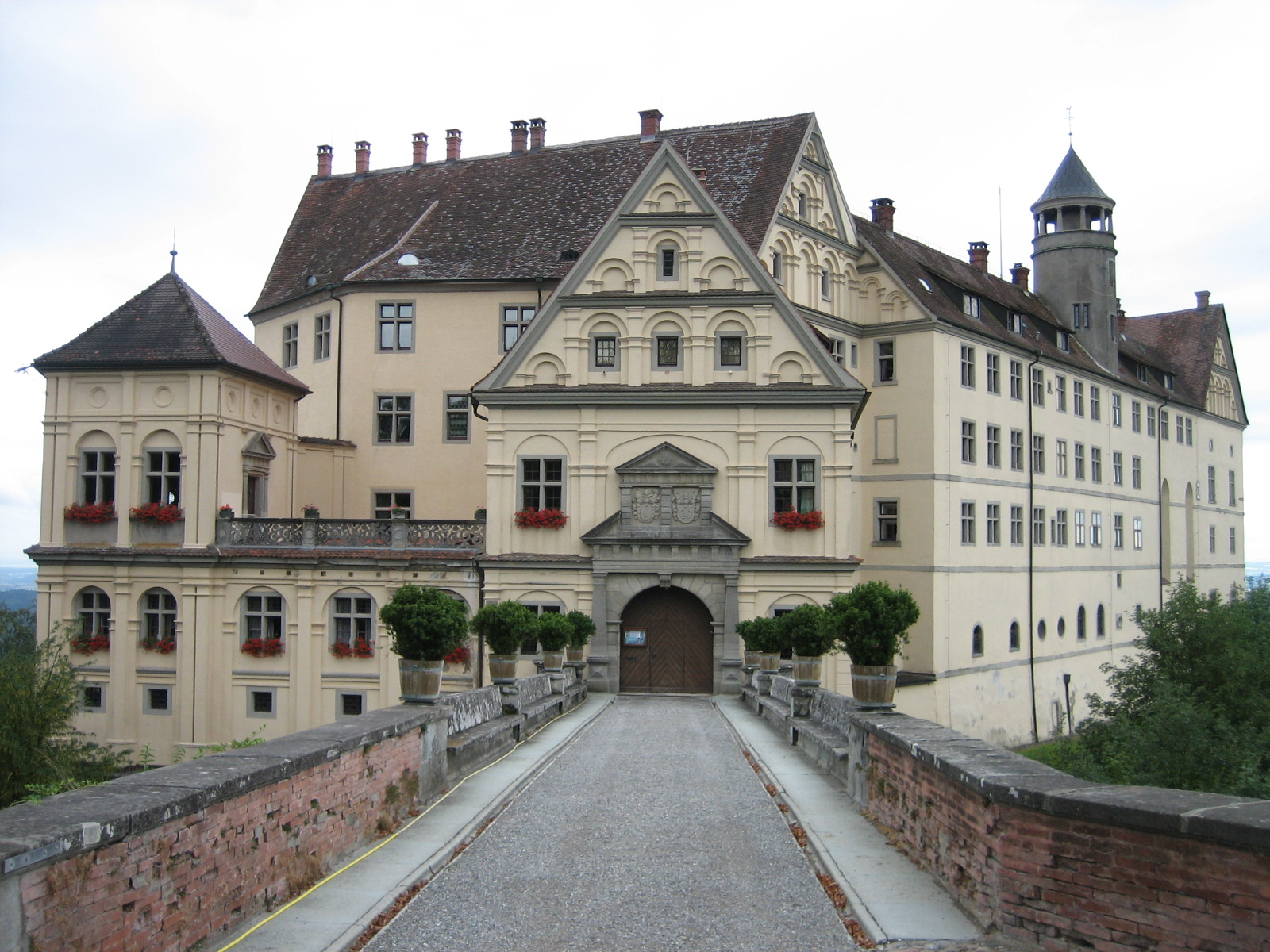

- Coat of arms

- Location of Heiligenberg within Bodenseekreis district
- Interactive map of Heiligenberg
- Location within Germany Location within Baden-Württemberg
- Coordinates: 47°49′15″N 09°18′45″E
- Country: Germany
- State: Baden-Württemberg
- Admin. region: Tübingen
- District: Bodenseekreis

Government
  - Mayor (2023–31): Denis Lehmann

Area
  - Total: 40.75 km^{2} (15.73 sq mi)
- Elevation: 726 m (2,382 ft)

Population (2025-12-31)
  - Total: 2,931
  - Density: 71.93/km^{2} (186.3/sq mi)
- Time zone: UTC+01:00 (CET)
  - Summer (DST): UTC+02:00 (CEST)
- Postal codes: 88633
- Dialling codes: 07554
- Vehicle registration: FN
- Website: www.heiligenberg.de

Heiligenberg (German pronunciation: [ˈhaɪlɪɡn̩ˌbɛʁk]) is a municipality and a village in the Bodensee district in Baden-Württemberg, about seven kilometres north of Salem, in Germany.

== Location and climate ==
Heiligenberg (literally: the Holy Mountain or the Mountain of Saints) is located in the upper Linzgau region. It is located directly on top of an end moraine from the Würm glaciation. Because of its location, Heiligenberg offers visitors an exceptional panoramic view of Lake Constance and the Alps, and is therefore also known as "the viewing terrace of the Lake," due to the altitude of the town, which is between 700 and 800 meters above sea level. In the summer there is, in contrast to the lake area, less sultry days and in winter the snow is much heavier, which is why in Heiligenberg and the surrounding area winter sports are popular. The geographic features and climate of the area make Heiligenberg a nationally recognized health resort.

== History ==
Parts of the town area show traces of settlement from the Stone Age. Christianity arrived at the village around AD 600 through the Irish disciple Saint Gall. It is unclear whether the name Heiligenberg comes from this period, or in pre-Christian times as a local place of worship.

1083 was the year Heiligenberg (as Mons Sanctus) was first mentioned. In the 13th century a local Count built a castle. By 1535 the castle was in the possession of the Princely House of Fürstenberg and became a magnificent chateau. It is still in possession of this noble family today.
