= Bodenseekreis =

Coordinates: 47°44′N 9°23′E

Bodensee
- District
- Flag Coat of arms
- Country: Germany
- State: Baden-Württemberg
- Adm. region: Tübingen
- Capital: Friedrichshafen

Government
  - District admin.: Luca Wilhelm Prayon (CDU)

Area
  - Total: 664.64 km^{2} (256.62 sq mi)

Population (31 December 2024)
  - Total: 220,804
  - Density: 332.22/km^{2} (860.44/sq mi)
- Time zone: UTC+01:00 (CET)
  - Summer (DST): UTC+02:00 (CEST)
- Vehicle registration: FN, TT, ÜB
- Website: www.bodenseekreis.de

Bodenseekreis ("Lake Constance district") is a Landkreis (district) in the south-east of Baden-Württemberg, Germany. Neighboring districts are (from west, clockwise) Konstanz, Sigmaringen and Ravensburg, and in Bavaria, Lindau district. To the south, on the opposite shores of Lake Constance, lies Switzerland.

== History ==
The district was created in 1973, when the previous district Tettnang was merged with most of the district Überlingen.

== Geography ==
The district is located at the northern shore of Lake Constance (German: Bodensee), which also gives the district its name. The landscape covered by the district is called Oberschwäbisches Hügelland and Westallgäuer Hügelland, and as the name suggests it is a mostly hilly landscape.

== Partnerships ==
The district has a partnership with the Muldentalkreis in Saxony, Germany, as well as with the Polish district Częstochowa.

== Coat of arms ==
The blue colour as well as the three wavy lines at the bottom of the coat of arms represent the Lake Constance. The wheel derives from the coat of arms of the Lords of Markdorf and Raderach, but it also represents the industry in the district.

== Cities and towns ==
Clickable map of towns and municipalities in the district

| Cities | Towns |
|---|---|
| 1. Friedrichshafen; 2. Markdorf; 3. Meersburg; 4. Tettnang; 5. Überlingen | 1. Bermatingen; 2. Daisendorf; 3. Deggenhausertal; 4. Eriskirch; 5. Frickingen; 6. Hagnau am Bodensee; 7. Heiligenberg; 8. Immenstaad am Bodensee; 9. Kressbronn am Bodensee; 10. Langenargen; 11. Meckenbeuren; 12. Neukirch; 13. Oberteuringen; 14. Owingen; 15. Salem; 16. Sipplingen; 17. Stetten; 18. Uhldingen-Mühlhofen |
| Administrative districts | 1. Bermatingen; 2. Daisendorf; 3. Deggenhausertal; 4. Eriskirch; 5. Frickingen; 6. Hagnau am Bodensee; 7. Heiligenberg; 8. Immenstaad am Bodensee; 9. Kressbronn am Bodensee; 10. Langenargen; 11. Meckenbeuren; 12. Neukirch; 13. Oberteuringen; 14. Owingen; 15. Salem; 16. Sipplingen; 17. Stetten; 18. Uhldingen-Mühlhofen |
| 1. Eriskirch-Kressbronn-Langenargen; 2. Friedrichshafen; 3. Markdorf; 4. Meersburg; 5. Salem; 6. Tettnang; 7. Überlingen | 1. Bermatingen; 2. Daisendorf; 3. Deggenhausertal; 4. Eriskirch; 5. Frickingen; 6. Hagnau am Bodensee; 7. Heiligenberg; 8. Immenstaad am Bodensee; 9. Kressbronn am Bodensee; 10. Langenargen; 11. Meckenbeuren; 12. Neukirch; 13. Oberteuringen; 14. Owingen; 15. Salem; 16. Sipplingen; 17. Stetten; 18. Uhldingen-Mühlhofen |
