= Biberach (Bundestag electoral district) =

Federal electoral district of Germany

292 Biberach
- Electoral district for the Bundestag
- Biberach in 2025
- State: Baden-Württemberg
- Population: 230,500 (2019)
- Electorate: 169,147 (2021)
- Major settlements: Biberach an der Riss; Laupheim; Bad Wurzach
- Area: 1,748.1 km^{2}

Current electoral district
- Created: 1949
- Party: CDU
- Member: Wolfgang Dahler
- Elected: 2025

Biberach is an electoral constituency (German: Wahlkreis) represented in the Bundestag. It elects one member via first-past-the-post voting. Under the current constituency numbering system, it is designated as constituency 292. It is located in southeastern Baden-Württemberg, comprising the Biberach district and northeastern parts of the Ravensburg district.

Biberach was created for the inaugural 1949 federal election. Since 2009, it has been represented by Josef Rief of the Christian Democratic Union (CDU).

== Geography ==
Biberach is located in southeastern Baden-Württemberg. As of the 2021 federal election, it comprises the district of Biberach and the municipalities of Aichstetten, Aitrach, Bad Wurzach, and Kißlegg from the Ravensburg district.

== History ==
Biberach was created in 1949. In the 1949 election, it was Württemberg-Hohenzollern constituency 5 in the numbering system. In the 1953 through 1961 elections, it was number 194. In the 1965 through 1976 elections, it was number 198. In the 1980 through 1998 elections, it was number 196. In the 2002 and 2005 elections, it was number 293. Since the 2009 election, it has been number 292.

Originally, the constituency comprised the districts of Biberach, Saulgau, and Ehingen. In the 1965 through 1976 elections, it also contained the municipalities of Billafingen, Burgau, and Langenenslingen from the Sigmaringen district. In the 1980 election, it acquired a configuration similar to its current borders, but also containing the municipalities of Achberg, Amtzell, Argenbühl, Bad Waldsee, Bergatreute, Isny, Leutkirch, Vogt, Wangen, and Wolfegg from the Ravensburg district. It acquired its current borders in the 2009 election.

Election	No.	Name	Borders
1949	5	Biberach	Biberach district; Saulgau district; Ehingen district
1953	194	Biberach	Biberach district; Saulgau district; Ehingen district
1957	194	Biberach	Biberach district; Saulgau district; Ehingen district
1961	194	Biberach	Biberach district; Saulgau district; Ehingen district
1965	198	Biberach	Biberach district; Saulgau district; Ehingen district; Sigmaringen district (only Billafingen, Burgau, and Langenenslingen municipalities)
1969	198	Biberach	Biberach district; Saulgau district; Ehingen district; Sigmaringen district (only Billafingen, Burgau, and Langenenslingen municipalities)
1972	198	Biberach	Biberach district; Saulgau district; Ehingen district; Sigmaringen district (only Billafingen, Burgau, and Langenenslingen municipalities)
1976	198	Biberach	Biberach district; Saulgau district; Ehingen district; Sigmaringen district (only Billafingen, Burgau, and Langenenslingen municipalities)
1980	196	Biberach	Biberach district; Ravensburg district (only Achberg, Aichstetten, Aitrach, Amtzell, Argenbühl, Bad Waldsee, Bad Wurzach, Bergatreute, Isny, Kißlegg, Leutkirch, Vogt, Wangen, and Wolfegg municipalities)
1983	196	Biberach	Biberach district; Ravensburg district (only Achberg, Aichstetten, Aitrach, Amtzell, Argenbühl, Bad Waldsee, Bad Wurzach, Bergatreute, Isny, Kißlegg, Leutkirch, Vogt, Wangen, and Wolfegg municipalities)
1987	196	Biberach	Biberach district; Ravensburg district (only Achberg, Aichstetten, Aitrach, Amtzell, Argenbühl, Bad Waldsee, Bad Wurzach, Bergatreute, Isny, Kißlegg, Leutkirch, Vogt, Wangen, and Wolfegg municipalities)
1990	196	Biberach	Biberach district; Ravensburg district (only Achberg, Aichstetten, Aitrach, Amtzell, Argenbühl, Bad Waldsee, Bad Wurzach, Bergatreute, Isny, Kißlegg, Leutkirch, Vogt, Wangen, and Wolfegg municipalities)
1994	196	Biberach	Biberach district; Ravensburg district (only Achberg, Aichstetten, Aitrach, Amtzell, Argenbühl, Bad Waldsee, Bad Wurzach, Bergatreute, Isny, Kißlegg, Leutkirch, Vogt, Wangen, and Wolfegg municipalities)
1998	196	Biberach	Biberach district; Ravensburg district (only Achberg, Aichstetten, Aitrach, Amtzell, Argenbühl, Bad Waldsee, Bad Wurzach, Bergatreute, Isny, Kißlegg, Leutkirch, Vogt, Wangen, and Wolfegg municipalities)
2002	293	Biberach	Biberach district; Ravensburg district (only Achberg, Aichstetten, Aitrach, Amtzell, Argenbühl, Bad Waldsee, Bad Wurzach, Bergatreute, Isny, Kißlegg, Leutkirch, Vogt, Wangen, and Wolfegg municipalities)
2005	293	Biberach	Biberach district; Ravensburg district (only Achberg, Aichstetten, Aitrach, Amtzell, Argenbühl, Bad Waldsee, Bad Wurzach, Bergatreute, Isny, Kißlegg, Leutkirch, Vogt, Wangen, and Wolfegg municipalities)
2009	292	Biberach	Biberach district; Ravensburg district (only Aichstetten, Aitrach, Bad Wurzach, and Kißlegg municipalities)
2013	292	Biberach	Biberach district; Ravensburg district (only Aichstetten, Aitrach, Bad Wurzach, and Kißlegg municipalities)
2017	292	Biberach	Biberach district; Ravensburg district (only Aichstetten, Aitrach, Bad Wurzach, and Kißlegg municipalities)
2021	292	Biberach	Biberach district; Ravensburg district (only Aichstetten, Aitrach, Bad Wurzach, and Kißlegg municipalities)
2025	292	Biberach	Biberach district; Ravensburg district (only Aichstetten, Aitrach, Bad Wurzach, and Kißlegg municipalities)

== Members ==
The constituency has been held continuously by Christian Democratic Union (CDU) since its creation. It was first represented by Bernhard Bauknecht from 1949 to 1969, followed by Eugen Maucher from 1969 to 1976 and Isidor Früh from 1976 to 1980. Alois Graf von Waldburg-Zeil was representative from 1980 to 1998, followed by Franz Romer from 1998 to 2009. Josef Rief was elected in 2009, and re-elected in 2013, 2017, and 2021.

Election	Member	Party	%
1949	Bernhard Bauknecht	CDU	82.0
1953	Bernhard Bauknecht	CDU	79.1
1957	Bernhard Bauknecht	CDU	80.0
1961	Bernhard Bauknecht	CDU	75.3
1965	Bernhard Bauknecht	CDU	74.2
1969	Eugen Maucher	CDU	73.1
1972	Eugen Maucher	CDU	72.1
1976	Isidor Früh	CDU	72.9
1980	Alois Graf von Waldburg-Zeil	CDU	70.6
1983	Alois Graf von Waldburg-Zeil	CDU	75.1
1987	Alois Graf von Waldburg-Zeil	CDU	67.6
1990	Alois Graf von Waldburg-Zeil	CDU	62.1
1994	Alois Graf von Waldburg-Zeil	CDU	58.9
1998	Franz Romer	CDU	48.5
2002	Franz Romer	CDU	57.7
2005	Franz Romer	CDU	52.4
2009	Josef Rief	CDU	42.7
2013	Josef Rief	CDU	59.0
2017	Josef Rief	CDU	44.5
2021	Josef Rief	CDU	35.1
2025	Wolfgang Dahler	CDU	40.9

== Election results ==
=== 2025 election ===
Federal election (2025): Biberach
Notes:	Blue background denotes the winner of the electorate vote. Pink background denotes a candidate elected from their party list. Yellow background denotes an electorate win by a list member, or other incumbent. A ✓ or ✗ denotes status of any incumbent, win or lose respectively.						
Party	Candidate	Votes	%	±%	Party votes	%	±%
CDU	Wolfgang Dahler	58,651	40.9	▲5.7	55,024	38.3	▲7.7
AfD	Paula Gulde	32,075	22.4	▲12.2	33,315	23.2	▲12.4
SPD	Martin Gerster	18,225	12.7	▼5.9	14,951	10.4	▼7.1
Greens	Anja Reinalter	14,819	10.3	▼3.2	14,064	9.8	▼3.9
FDP	Ben Dippe	5,555	3.9	▼6.0	7,298	5.1	▼9.4
BSW					5,491	3.8	
Left	Maximilian Krippner	5,447	3.8	▲2.2	6,496	4.5	▲2.3
FW	Reinhold Bopp	4,4638	3.2	▼0.1	2,696	1.9	▼1.3
Tierschutzpartei	Simone Bischof	2,401	1.7	▼0.1	1,258	0.9	▼0.6
Volt	Karolin Werkmann	1,699	1.2		885	0.6	▲0.4
dieBasis				▼2.4	613	0.4	▼2.0
ÖDP				▼1.9	576	0.4	▼0.5
PARTEI				▼1.41	558	0.4	▼0.5
Pirates				▼0.6			▼0.4
Team Todenhöfer							▼0.3
Bündnis C					273	0.2	0.0
Gesundheitsforschung							▼0.1
BD					215	0.1	
Humanists							▼0.1
MLPD					29	0.0	0.0
Informal votes		1,020			788		
Total valid votes		143,510			143,742		
Turnout		144,530	85.1	▲6.3			
CDU hold	Majority	26,576	18.5	▼6.5			

=== 2021 election ===
Federal election (2021): Biberach
Notes:	Blue background denotes the winner of the electorate vote. Pink background denotes a candidate elected from their party list. Yellow background denotes an electorate win by a list member, or other incumbent. A ✓ or ✗ denotes status of any incumbent, win or lose respectively.						
Party	Candidate	Votes	%	±%	Party votes	%	±%
CDU	✓ Josef Rief	46,458	35.1	▼9.3	40,472	30.6	▼12.5
SPD	Martin Gerster	24,567	18.6	▲1.6	23,152	17.5	▲4.8
Greens	Anja Reinalter	17,912	13.6	0.0	18,070	13.7	▲2.4
AfD	Rebecca Weißbrodt	13,469	10.2	▼1.1	14,308	10.8	▼1.6
FDP	Florian Hirt	13,045	9.9	▲2.4	19,163	14.5	▲3.5
FW	Ulrich Bossler	4,431	3.4	▲2.1	4,155	3.1	▲2.2
dieBasis	Jan-Christopher Zubel	3,134	2.4		3,207	2.4	
ÖDP	Norbert Huchler	2,489	1.9	▲0.6	1,191	0.9	0.0
Tierschutzpartei	Simone Bischof	2,371	1.8		1,921	1.5	▲0.7
Left	Rainer Schaaf	2,064	1.6	▼2.2	2,967	2.2	▼2.4
PARTEI	Sven Milverstaedt	1,471	1.1		1,175	0.9	▲0.4
Pirates	Samuel Schmid	760	0.6		559	0.4	0.0
Team Todenhöfer					433	0.3	
Volt					332	0.3	
Bündnis C					241	0.2	
Bürgerbewegung					200	0.2	
Gesundheitsforschung					189	0.1	
NPD					158	0.1	▼0.2
DiB					122	0.1	0.0
Humanists					117	0.1	
Bündnis 21					43	0.0	
LKR					27	0.0	
DKP					16	0.0	0.0
MLPD					12	0.0	0.0
Informal votes		1,174			1,115		
Total valid votes		132,171			132,230		
Turnout		133,345	78.8	0.0			
CDU hold	Majority	21,891	16.5	▼10.9			

=== 2017 election ===
Federal election (2017): Biberach
Notes:	Blue background denotes the winner of the electorate vote. Pink background denotes a candidate elected from their party list. Yellow background denotes an electorate win by a list member, or other incumbent. A ✓ or ✗ denotes status of any incumbent, win or lose respectively.						
Party	Candidate	Votes	%	±%	Party votes	%	±%
CDU	✓ Josef Rief	57,837	44.5	▼14.5	56,162	43.1	▼13.2
SPD	Martin Gerster	22,034	16.9	▼3.0	16,557	12.7	▼2.1
Greens	Anja Reinalter	17,589	13.5	▲4.5	14,729	11.3	▲2.2
AfD	Matthias Stiel	14,640	11.3		16,236	12.5	▲8.2
FDP	Tim Hundertmark	9,775	7.5	▲5.4	14,321	11.0	▲6.1
Left	Ralph Heidenreich	4,907	3.8	▲0.4	5,997	4.6	▲1.2
ÖDP	Gudrun Diebold	1,724	1.3	▼0.3	1,180	0.9	▼0.1
FW	Deborah Schiwig	1,576	1.2	▼0.9	1,201	0.9	▼0.3
Tierschutzpartei					923	0.7	0.0
PARTEI					620	0.5	
Pirates					609	0.5	▼1.6
NPD					384	0.3	▼0.6
Tierschutzallianz					293	0.2	
DM					244	0.2	
BGE					224	0.2	
Menschliche Welt					219	0.2	
V-Partei³					156	0.1	
DiB					129	0.1	
DIE RECHTE					39	0.0	
MLPD					36	0.0	0.0
DKP					16	0.0	
Informal votes		1,611			1,418		
Total valid votes		130,082			130,275		
Turnout		131,693	78.8	▲4.5			
CDU hold	Majority	35,803	27.6	▼11.6			

=== 2013 election ===
Federal election (2013): Biberach
Notes:	Blue background denotes the winner of the electorate vote. Pink background denotes a candidate elected from their party list. Yellow background denotes an electorate win by a list member, or other incumbent. A ✓ or ✗ denotes status of any incumbent, win or lose respectively.						
Party	Candidate	Votes	%	±%	Party votes	%	±%
CDU	✓ Josef Rief	70,540	59.0	▲16.3	67,567	56.3	▲13.1
SPD	Martin Gerster	23,786	19.9	▼3.2	17,814	14.8	▲1.1
Greens	Eugen Schlachter	10,754	9.0	▼0.8	10,887	9.1	▼1.8
Left	Ralph Heidenreich	4,013	3.4	▼2.0	4,075	3.4	▼2.4
Pirates	Lisa Rudolf	3,411	2.9		2,503	2.1	▲0.1
FDP	Norbert Mayer	2,567	2.1	▼13.0	5,851	4.9	▼14.0
AfD					5,072	4.2	
FW	Ulrich Bossler	2,558	2.1		1,516	1.3	
ÖDP	Gudrun Diebold	1,958	1.6	▲0.1	1,166	1.0	▼0.4
NPD					1,062	0.9	▼0.3
Tierschutzpartei					825	0.7	▼0.1
REP					599	0.5	▼0.6
RENTNER					316	0.3	
Volksabstimmung					273	0.2	▼0.1
PBC					209	0.2	▼0.2
Party of Reason					134	0.1	
PRO					105	0.1	
BIG					66	0.1	
BüSo					28	0.0	0.0
MLPD					20	0.0	0.0
Informal votes		2,131			1,630		
Total valid votes		119,587			120,088		
Turnout		121,718	74.3	▲2.1			
CDU hold	Majority	46,574	39.1	▲19.4			

=== 2009 election ===
Federal election (2009): Biberach
Notes:	Blue background denotes the winner of the electorate vote. Pink background denotes a candidate elected from their party list. Yellow background denotes an electorate win by a list member, or other incumbent. A ✓ or ✗ denotes status of any incumbent, win or lose respectively.						
Party	Candidate	Votes	%	±%	Party votes	%	±%
CDU	Josef Rief	48,662	42.7	▼10.5	49,688	43.2	▼8.4
SPD	Martin Gerster	26,275	23.0	▲3.9	15,742	13.7	▼7.9
FDP	Oliver Lukner	17,233	15.1	▲7.6	21,665	18.8	▲7.8
Greens	Thomas Oelmayer	11,176	9.8	▼4.1	12,524	10.9	▲3.1
Left	Herbert Wilzek	6,117	5.4	▲3.2	6,636	5.8	▲3.2
Pirates					2,277	2.0	
NPD	Siegfried Härle	2,389	2.1	0.0	1,401	1.2	▼0.1
ÖDP	Gudrun Diebold	1,760	1.5		1,536	1.3	
REP					1,289	1.1	▼0.7
Tierschutzpartei					879	0.8	
Independent	Peter Baer	414	0.4				
PBC					413	0.4	0.0
Volksabstimmung					382	0.3	
DIE VIOLETTEN					277	0.2	
DVU					100	0.1	
BüSo					77	0.1	▼0.1
ADM					60	0.1	
MLPD					40	0.0	0.0
Informal votes		3,263			2,303		
Total valid votes		114,026			114,986		
Turnout		117,289	72.2	▼7.0			
CDU hold	Majority	22,387	19.7	▼14.4			

=== 2005 election ===
Federal election (2005):Biberach
Notes:	Blue background denotes the winner of the electorate vote. Pink background denotes a candidate elected from their party list. Yellow background denotes an electorate win by a list member, or other incumbent. A ✓ or ✗ denotes status of any incumbent, win or lose respectively.						
Party	Candidate	Votes	%	±%	Party votes	%	±%
CDU	✓ Franz Romer	94,968	52.4	▼5.3	90,358	49.8	▼4.4
SPD	Martin Gerster	37,112	20.5	▼5.6	40,503	22.3	▼1.9
Greens	Oswald Metzger	25,445	14.0	▲5.7	16,115	8.9	▼1.0
FDP	Xaver Schmid	13,058	7.2	▲1.4	20,373	11.2	▲4.7
Left	Karl Schweizer	4,259	2.4	▲1.5	4,926	2.7	▲2.1
NPD	Siegfried Härle	3,488	1.9	▲0.7	2,096	1.2	▲0.7
REP					2,929	1.6	▲0.1
Independent	Martin Höld	2,875	1.6				
Familie					2,218	1.2	
GRAUEN					803	0.4	▲0.3
PBC					732	0.4	▲0.1
BüSo					212	0.1	▲0.1
MLPD					103	0.1	
Informal votes		3,836			3,673		
Total valid votes		181,205			181,368		
Turnout		185,041	79.0	▼2.4			
CDU hold	Majority	57,856	31.9				
