= Wangen (electoral district) =

State electoral district of Germany

68: Wangen
- Electoral district for the Landtag of Baden-Württemberg
- Wangen in 2026
- District: Ravensburg and Biberach
- Electorate: 129,673 (2026)
- Major settlements: Achberg, Aichstetten, Aitrach, Amtzell, Argenbühl, Aulendorf, Bad Waldsee, Bad Wurzach, Bergatreute, Isny im Allgäu, Kißlegg, Leutkirch im Allgäu, Vogt, Wangen im Allgäu, Wolfegg, Berkheim, Dettingen an der Iller, Erolzheim, Kirchberg an der Iller, Kirchdorf an der Iller, Rot an der Rot, and Tannheim

Current electoral district
- Party: CDU
- Member: Nicole Raimund Haser

Wangen is an electoral constituency (German: Wahlkreis) represented in the Landtag of Baden-Württemberg. Since 2026, it has elected one member via first-past-the-post voting. Voters cast a second vote under which additional seats are allocated proportionally state-wide. Under the constituency numbering system, it is designated as constituency 68. It is split between the districts of Ravensburg and Biberach.

== Geography ==
The constituency includes –

- The municipalities of Achberg, Aichstetten, Aitrach, Amtzell, Argenbühl, Aulendorf, Bad Waldsee, Bad Wurzach, Bergatreute, Isny im Allgäu, Kißlegg, Leutkirch im Allgäu, Vogt, Wangen im Allgäu, Wolfegg, within the district of Ravensburg.
- The municipalities of Berkheim, Dettingen an der Iller, Erolzheim, Kirchberg an der Iller, Kirchdorf an der Iller, Rot an der Rot, and Tannheim, within the district of Biberach.

There were 129,673 eligible voters in 2026.

== Members ==
=== First mandate ===
Both prior to and since the electoral reforms for the 2026 election, the winner of the plurality of the vote (first-past-the-post) in every constituency won the first mandate.

Election	Member	Party	%
1976	Josef Siedler	CDU	
1980	Josef Dreier	CDU	
1984	Josef Dreier	CDU	
1988	Josef Dreier	CDU	
1992	Josef Dreier	CDU	
1996	Helmut Kiefl	CDU	
2001	Helmut Kiefl	CDU	
2006	Paul Locherer	CDU	57.6
2011	Paul Locherer	CDU	48.6
2016	Raimund Haser	CDU	35.1
2021	Petra Krebs	Grüne	31.3
2026	Raimund Haser	CDU	43.7

=== Second mandate ===
Prior to the electoral reforms for the 2026 election, the seats in the state parliament were allocated proportionately amongst parties which received more than 5% of valid votes across the state. The seats that were won proportionally for parties that did not win as many first mandates as seats they were entitled to, were allocated to their candidates which received the highest proportion of the vote in their respective constituencies. This meant that following some elections, a constituency would have one or more members elected under a second mandate.

Prior to 2011, these second mandates were allocated to the party candidates who got the greatest number of votes, whilst from 2011-2021, these were allocated according to percentage share of the vote.

Prior to 2016, this constituency did not elect any members on a second mandate.

Election	Member	Party
2016	Petra Krebs	Grüne
2021	Raimund Haser	CDU

== Election results ==
=== 2026 election ===
State election (2026): Wangen
Notes:	Blue background denotes the winner of the electorate vote. Pink background denotes a candidate elected from their party list. Yellow background denotes an electorate win by a list member, or other incumbent. A ✓ or ✗ denotes status of any incumbent, win or lose respectively.						
Party	Candidate	Votes	%	±%	Party votes	%	±%
CDU	Raimund Haser	39,169	43.7	▲13.1	32,899	36.5	▲5.9
Greens	✗ Petra Krebs	19,993	22.3	▼9.0	22,591	25.1	▼6.2
AfD	Carmen Haug	17,935	20.0	▲10.5	17,759	19.7	▲10.2
SPD	Rosalind Hübner	4,967	5.5	▼1.0	3,556	3.9	▼2.6
FDP	Daniel Derscheid	3,935	4.4	▼4.5	3,343	3.7	▼5.2
Left	Sophie Heiß	3,711	4.1	▲1.4	2,900	3.2	▲0.5
FW					2,464	2.7	▼1.1
BSW					1,149	1.3	
APT					816	0.9	
Volt					621	0.7	▲0.1
ÖDP					441	0.5	▼1.5
dieBasis					389	0.4	▼1.1
PARTEI					327	0.4	
Pensioners					225	0.2	
Bündnis C					194	0.2	
Values					146	0.2	
Team Todenhöfer					101	0.1	
PdF					75	0.1	
Verjüngungsforschung					57	0.1	
KlimalisteBW					45	0.0	▼0.9
Humanists					29	0.0	
Informal votes		982			565		
Total valid votes		89,710			90,127		
Turnout		90,692	69.9	▲6.2			
CDU gain from Greens	Majority	19,176	21.4				

== See also ==
- Politics of Baden-Württemberg
- Landtag of Baden-Württemberg
