= Bernhard Bauknecht =

German politician (1900–1985)

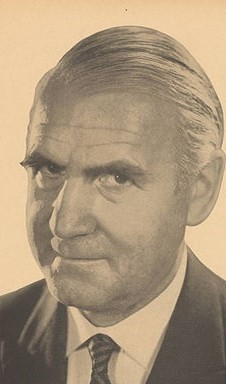
- Bernhard Bauknecht

Member of the Bundestag; for Biberach
- In office 7 September 1949 – 20 October 1969
- Preceded by: Constituency established
- Succeeded by: Eugen Maucher

Member of the; Landtag of Württemberg-Hohenzollern; for Ravensburg
- In office 3 June 1947 – 31 March 1952
- Preceded by: Constituency established
- Succeeded by: Constituency abolished

Personal details
- Born: 31 March 1900 Albertshofen, Germany
- Died: 23 October 1985 (aged 85) Ravensburg, West Germany
- Party: Christian Democratic Union
- Education: University of Hohenheim

Bernhard Bauknecht (31 March 1900 – 23 October 1985) was a German farmer and politician of the Christian Democratic Union (CDU) and former member of the German Bundestag.

== Life ==
From 1946 to 1952 Bauknecht was a member of the Advisory State Assembly and then of the State Parliament for Württemberg-Hohenzollern. In the state parliament he headed the committee for food and agriculture. From 1949 to 1969 he was a member of the German Bundestag. There he represented the constituency of Biberach. From 1953 to 1969 he was Chairman of the Bundestag Committee for Food, Agriculture and Forestry.

In the 1949 Bundestag elections he achieved the best first-past-the-post result ever achieved in a constituency, with 82% of the votes cast.

== Literature ==
Herbst, Ludolf; Jahn, Bruno (2002). Vierhaus, Rudolf (ed.). Biographisches Handbuch der Mitglieder des Deutschen Bundestages. 1949–2002 [Biographical Handbook of the Members of the German Bundestag. 1949–2002] (in German). München: De Gruyter - De Gruyter Saur. p. 1715. ISBN 978-3-11-184511-1.
