= Wolfgang Dahler =

German politician (born 1975)

Wolfgang Dahler MdB

Member of the Bundestag; for Biberach
- Incumbent
- Assumed office 25 March 2025
- Preceded by: Josef Rief

Personal details
- Born: 6 May 1975 (age 51) Biberach an der Riß, West Germany
- Party: Christian Democratic Union
- Education: University of Tübingen

Wolfgang Dahler (born 6 May 1975) is a German politician who was elected as a member of the Bundestag in 2025. He has served as district councillor of Biberach since 2024.
