= Owingen =

- Municipality
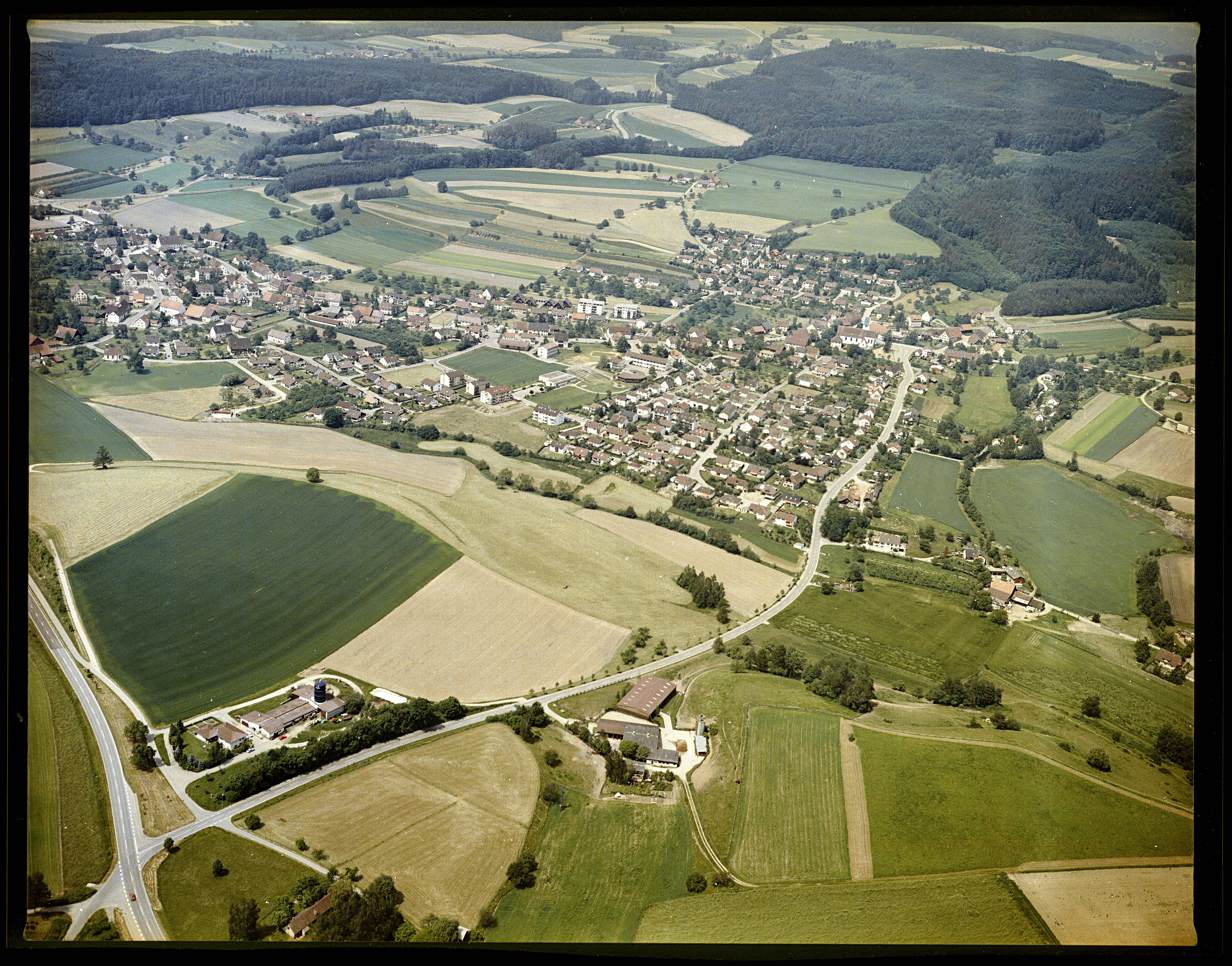
- Aerial image of Owingen (1983)

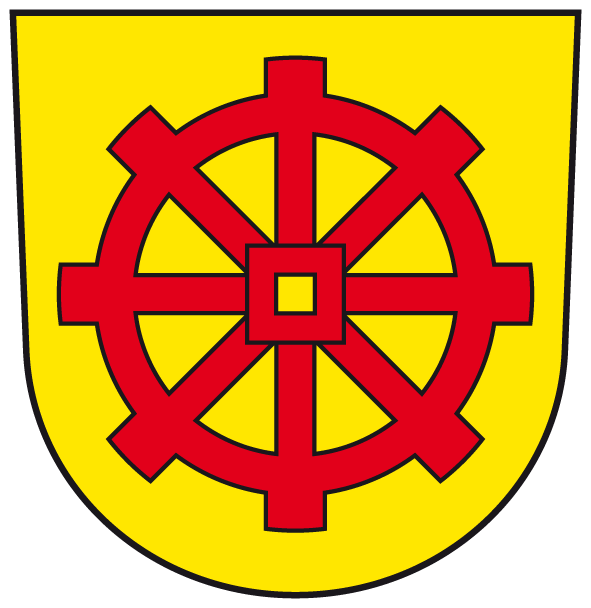
- Coat of arms

- Location of Owingen within Bodenseekreis district
- Interactive map of Owingen
- Location within Germany Location within Baden-Württemberg
- Coordinates: 47°48′30″N 9°10′15″E
- Country: Germany
- State: Baden-Württemberg
- Admin. region: Tübingen
- District: Bodenseekreis
- Subdivisions: 4 (Owingen, Billafingen, Hohenbodman, Taisersdorf)

Government
  - Mayor (2017–25): Henrik Wengert

Area
  - Total: 36.73 km^{2} (14.18 sq mi)
- Elevation: 535 m (1,755 ft)

Population (2025-12-31)
  - Total: 4,430
  - Density: 121/km^{2} (312/sq mi)
- Time zone: UTC+01:00 (CET)
  - Summer (DST): UTC+02:00 (CEST)
- Postal codes: 88696
- Dialling codes: 07551
- Vehicle registration: FN
- Website: www.owingen.de

Owingen (German pronunciation: [ˈoːvɪŋən]) is a municipality in the district "Bodenseekreis" in Baden-Württemberg in Germany.

== Geography ==
=== Geographical Location ===
Owingen is located about six kilometers north of Überlingen in the "Lake Costance"-Region.

=== Municipal division ===
The municipality consist of the core town of Owingen, and the districts Billafingen, Hohenbodman and Taisersdorf.

District	Inhabitant (31.12.2019)	Area
Owingen	3229	1611 ha
Billafingen	756	917 ha
Hohenbodman	228	811 ha
Taisersdorf	296	333 ha

=== Protected Areas ===
Look: List of Nature Monuments in Owingen

In Owingen are the Naturschutzgebiet Aachtobel and the Landschaftsschutzgebiet Drumlin "Im Hasenbühl" and "Gegez", two part areas by the FFH-Gebiets Bodensee Hinterland at Überlingen, and four water conservation areas.

== History ==
Owingen's first documentary mention can be found in the "Peterhaus Chronic" of 1134. However, the area was already in the 5th century populated by the Alemans. The district of Taisersdorf was first documented in 1155.

Through the following centuries, a close albeit not always frictionless connection with the Salem Monastery, to which the village had been subordinate since 1324.

In the Thirty Years' War, Owingen was destroyed by the swedes in 1634 and looted by the French in 1643.

Owingen became Baden with the Principal Conclusion of the Extraordinary Imperial Delegation and the secularization of the Salem Imperial Abbey. During the revolution, Owingen made weapons and soldiers available to the Baden Civil Armed Forces in May 1849.

The municipality coped well with structural change after the Second World War, and has roughly increased its population to this day. In the 1960s, Owingen was one of the first municipalities outside the larger cities on Lake Constance to have its own sewerage treatment plant.

Owingen was an independent municipality in the district of Überlingen from 1939, which in the course of the district reform on 1 January 1973 merged into the new Lake Constance District.

The municipality became internationally known when two planes collided on 1 July 2002. In the airspace above Owingen, a Bashkirian Airlines passenger aircraft (Flight 2937) collided with a DHL cargo aircraft (Flight 611). 71 people died in the accident, including many children who were travelling to Spain.

== Politics ==
=== Administrative community ===
Owingen has entered into an agreed administrative community with the municipality of Sipplingen and the large district town of Überlingen.

=== Mayors ===
- 1831–1842: Fidel Endres
- 1842–1869: Johann Storck
- 1870–1874: Josef Keller
- 1874–1896: Josef Endres
- 1896–1904: Gerhard Gams
- 1904–1929: Wilhelm Endres
- 1929–1945: Karl Mayer
- 1946: Edwin Lutz
- 1946–1969: Josef Fischer
- 1969–2001: Karl-Friedrich Reiner
- 2001–2009: Günther Former
- October 2009–January 2010 Rudolf Fischer
- Since 2010: Henrik Wengert

== Sister Cities ==
Since 1991, Owingen has been twinned with Coudoux, France.
