= Hohenbodman =

- Ortsteil of Owingen
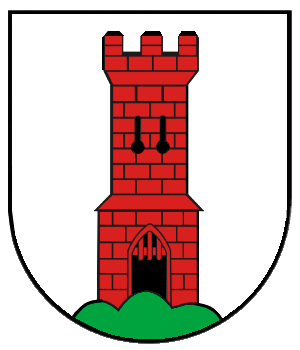
- Coat of arms
- Interactive map of Hohenbodman
- Location within Germany Location within Baden-Württemberg
- Coordinates: 47°49′24″N 9°12′40″E
- Country: Germany
- State: Baden-Württemberg
- Admin. region: Tübingen
- District: Bodenseekreis
- Municipality: Owingen

Area
  - Total: 8.11 km^{2} (3.13 sq mi)
- Elevation: 668 m (2,192 ft)

Population (2006-12-31)
  - Total: 246
  - Density: 30.3/km^{2} (78.6/sq mi)
- Time zone: UTC+01:00 (CET)
  - Summer (DST): UTC+02:00 (CEST)
- Dialling codes: 07557
- Vehicle registration: FN

Hohenbodman is a village in the municipality of Owingen in the western Bodenseekreis in Baden-Württemberg, Germany.

== Geography ==
=== Location ===
Hohenbodman is located at 660 metres (2,170 ft) above sea level on a hill above one of the oldest nature reserves in Germany, the Aachtobel, which is crossed by the Seefelder Aach. The highest point of the district, which is simultaneously the highest point in the municipality of Owingen, is located at 720 metres (2,360 ft) above sea level.

=== Organization ===
Hohenbodman includes the central village of Hohenbodman, the farms of Beutenmühle, Burghöfe, Häusern, Happenmühle, Homberg, Neuhof, Niederweiler, Pfaffenbühl, Simonshof, and Urzenreute, and the houses Fitzenhaus und Walthausen.

== History ==
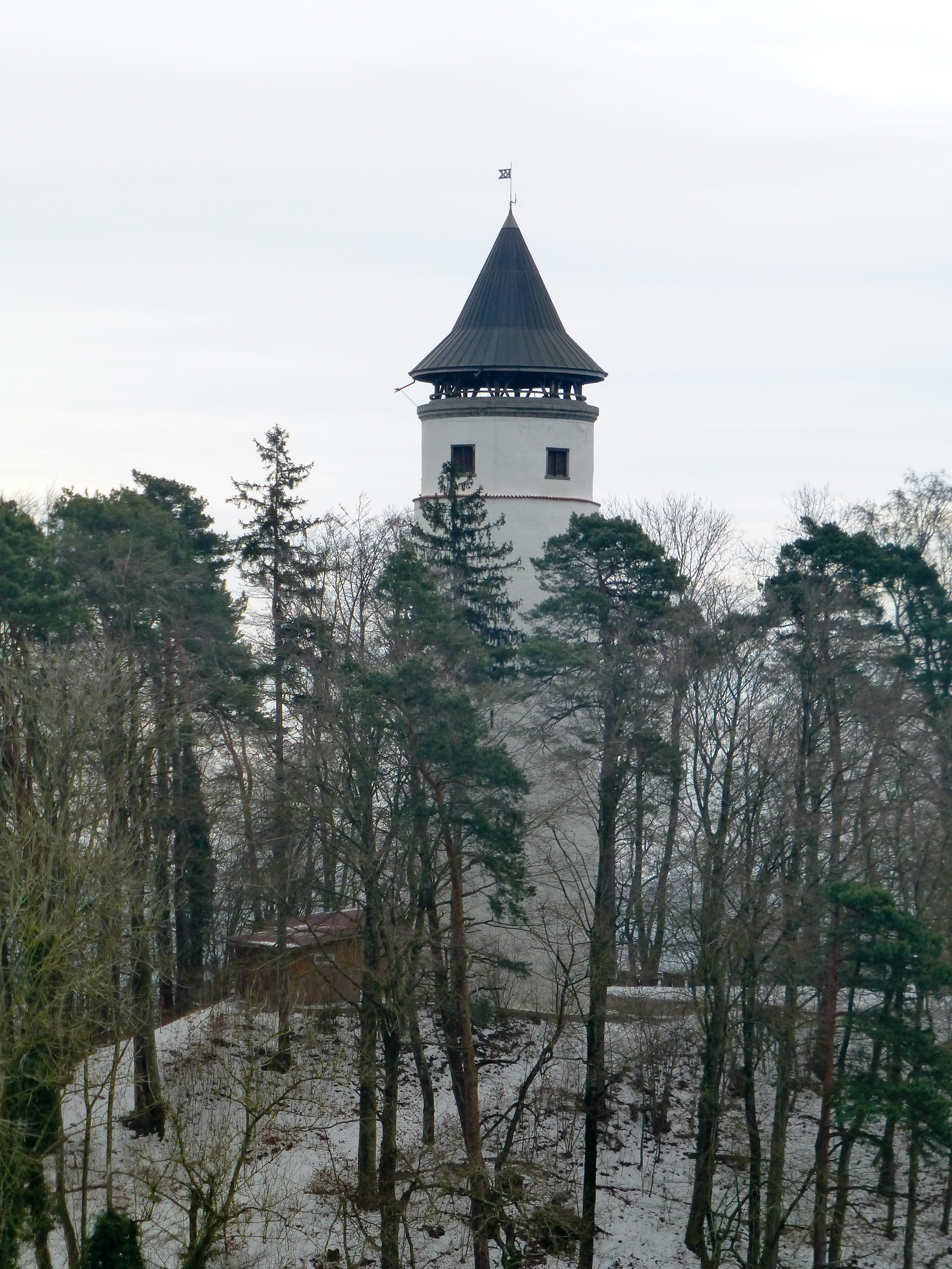
Hohenbodman Tower

The family of the Lords of Bodman, imperial ministerials of the Hohenstaufen dynasty and of the Bishop of Konstanz, had their ancestral seat at Hohenbodman Castle, around which the Lordship of Hohenbodman developed. The place itself was first mentioned in writing in 1325. The Lords of Bodmanlater sold the village and castle to the free imperial city of Überlingen after they moved to Bodman and it became their second home. The free imperial city of Überlingen subsequently renovated the castle. Da Überlingen zu dieser Zeit sehr wohlhabend und mächtig war, vergrößerten sie ihren Besitz und sicherten diesen mit kleineren Burgen ab.

During the Thirty Years‘ War in 1642, the entire castle including the tower was burnt down by the troops of Konrad Widerholt. It was subsequently rebuilt, and the Bailiff moved his official residence to the village.

Hohenbodman was an independent municipality in the Überlingen Landkreis. As part of the Baden-Württemberg political reforms of the 1970s, the Municipality merged into Owingen on January 1st, 1972. Owingen and by extension Hohenbodman also became part of the Bodenseekreis as part of the reforms.

== Coat of arms ==
The coat of arms of the formerly independent municipality features a red tower on a green mount.

== Culture and sights ==
=== Buildings and constructions ===
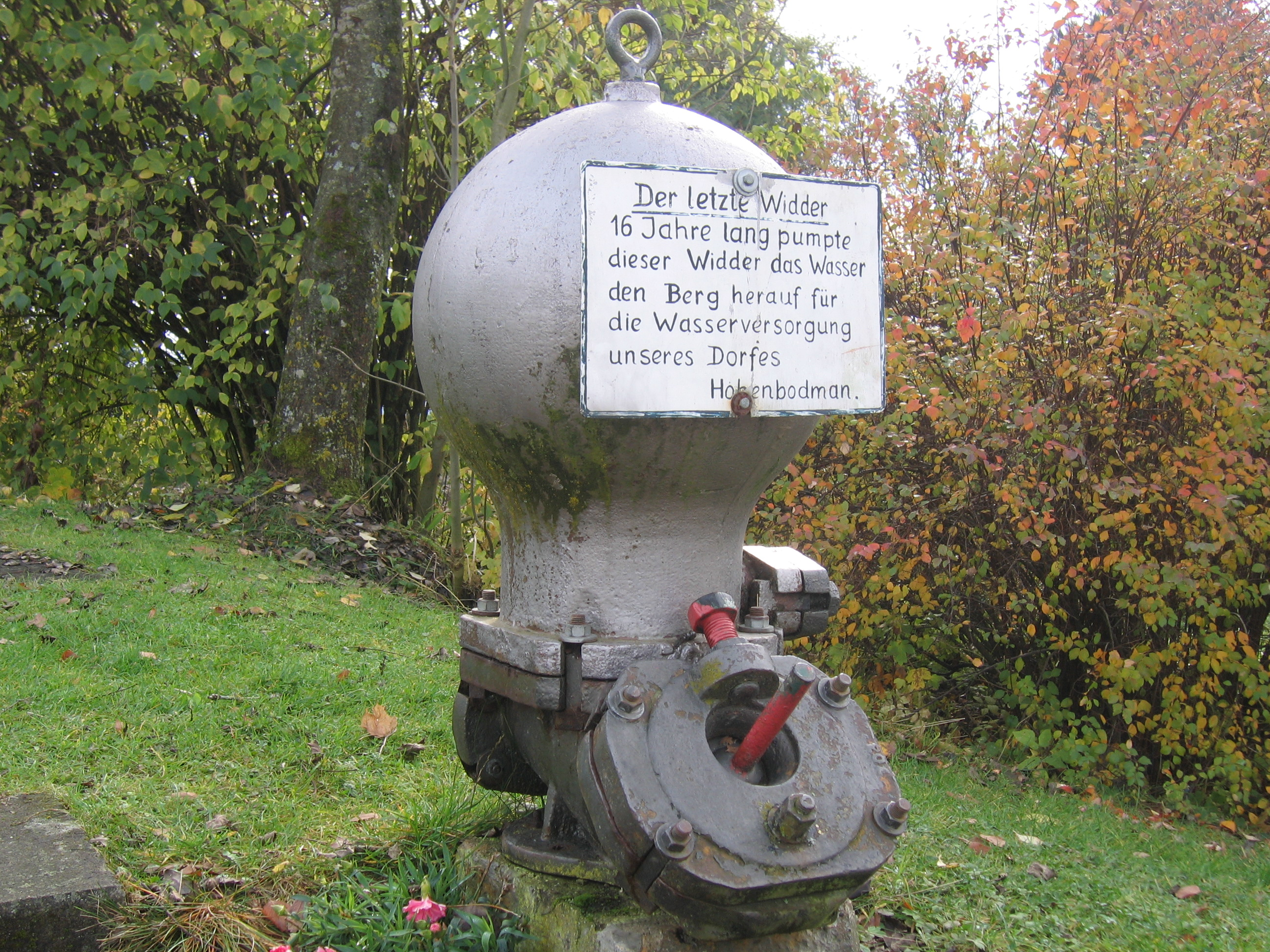
Hydraulic ram

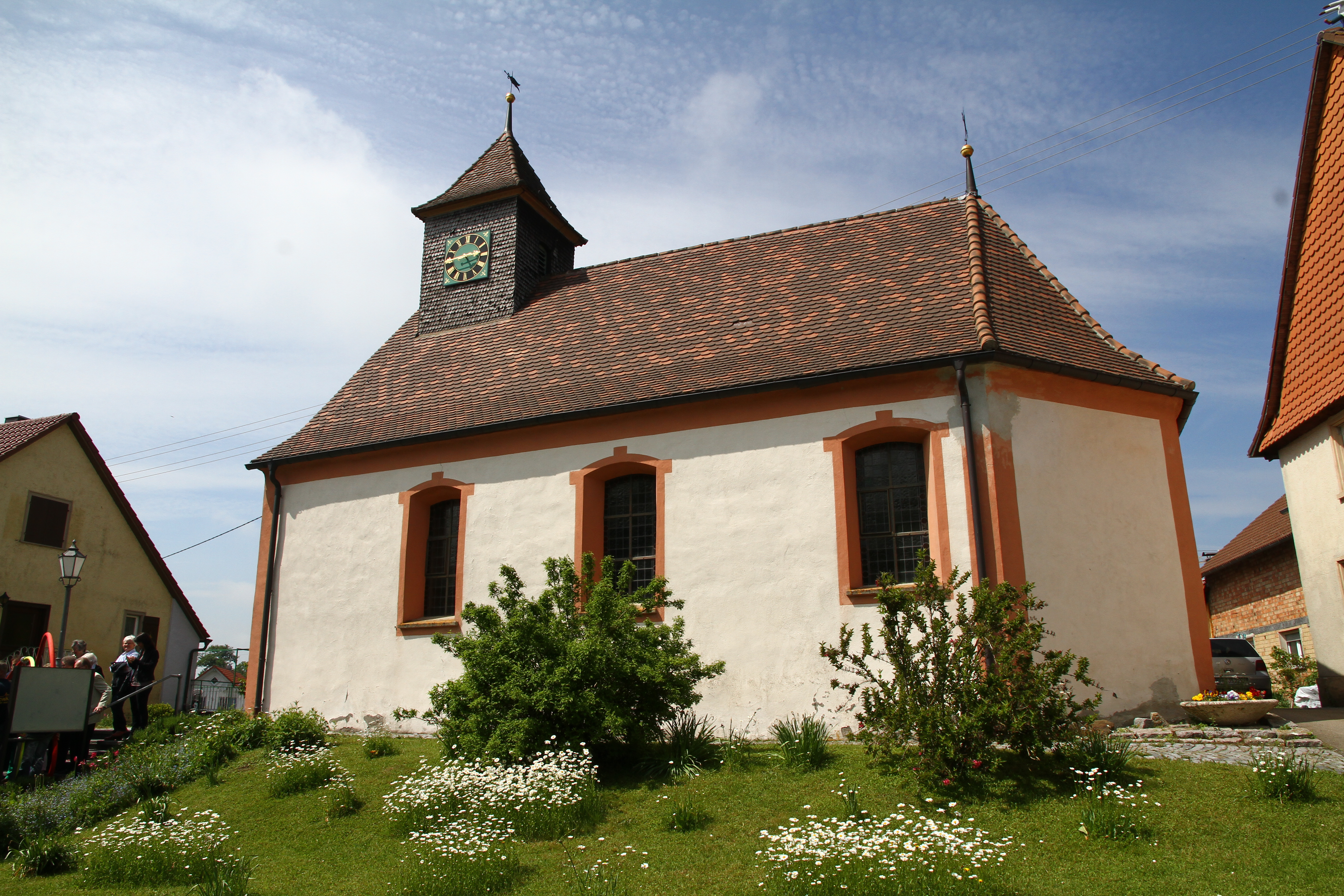
St. Georgskapelle

- In the middle of the village is the St. Georgskapelle, of which the oldest part, the gothic choir, is from the 14th century. The main building is from the 18
- The chapel at Häusernhof was built in the 17th century.
- Of the castle Hohenbodman, built in the 11th century, only the bergfried with its old high entrance at eight meters remains today. The landmark now serves as an observation tower.
- About 1.5 kilometres (0.93 mi) kilometers to the west, there is a castle site in the area known as Burstel.
- At the Seilerstobel (a gorge nearby), there was a former fortification
- The Happenmühle is a half-timbered house that was first mentioned in a document in 1111.
- On Lindenstraße, you can see a deep well (23 metres (75 ft)) and the last hydraulic ram with an air vessel, that previously pumped water to the village.
- In the district, there was the Kilsenberg Castle.

=== Nature ===
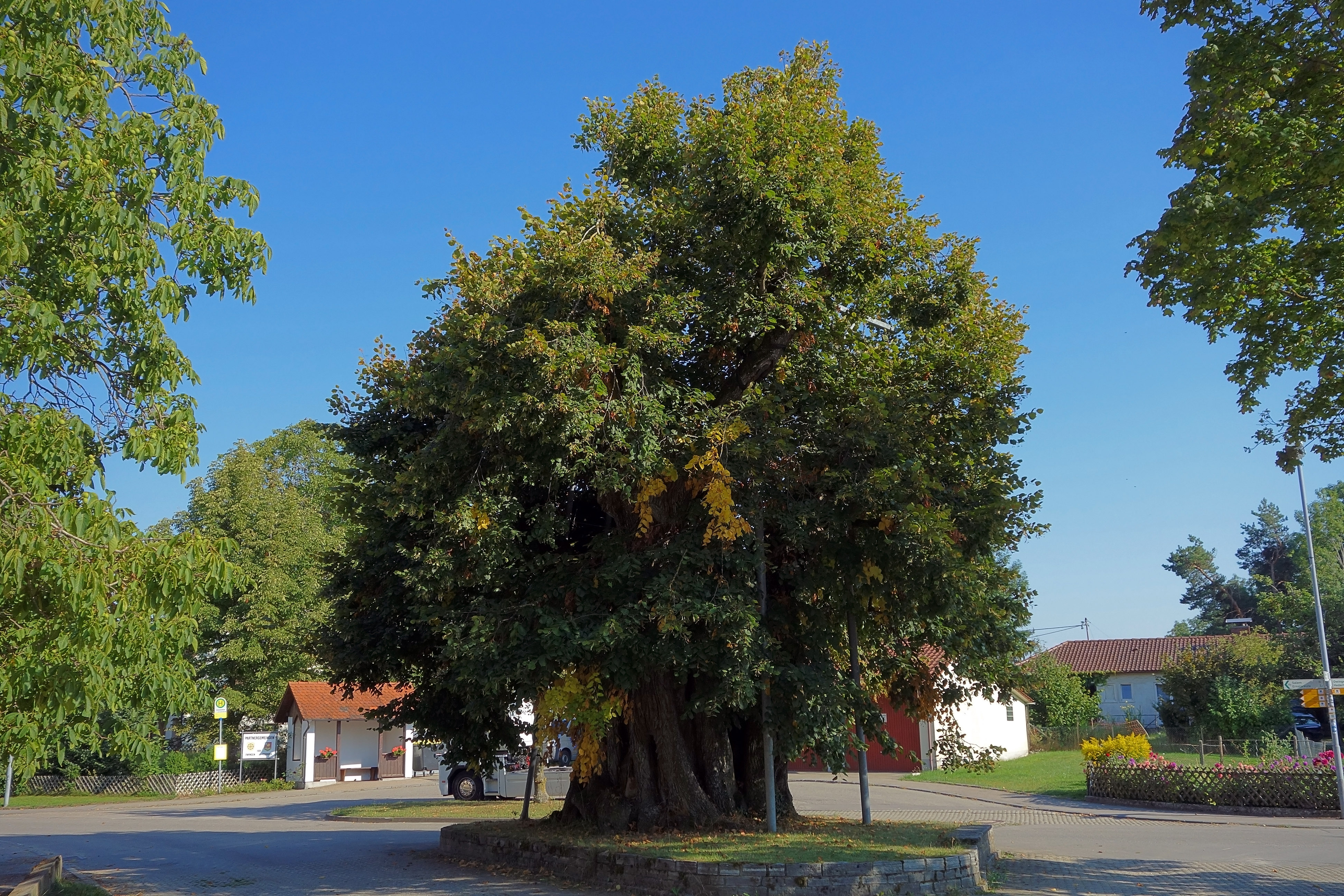
The Hohenbodman Linden

- The Hohenbodman Linden near the fire department is approximately 400–800 years old, and the oldest Lindens in Germany. It is also one of the thickest Lindens in Germany with a truck circumference of 9.87 metres (32.4 ft) (2013).

== Recreation ==
The Lake Constance Jubilation Path (Jubiläumsweg Bodenseekreis) and the Linzgau path of St. Jakob Via Beuronensis both run through the area.

== Literature ==
- Rudolf Koch: Der Linzgauleuchtturm Hohenbodman. Burg, Schloss, Ruine, Aussichtsturm. Gemeinde Owingen, Owingen 2019, ISBN 978-3-00-060300-6.
- Norbert Zysk: Hohenbodman: ein Beitrag über das ehemalige Schloss Hohenbodman, Gemeinde Owingen, 1979.
