= Josef Rief =

German politician

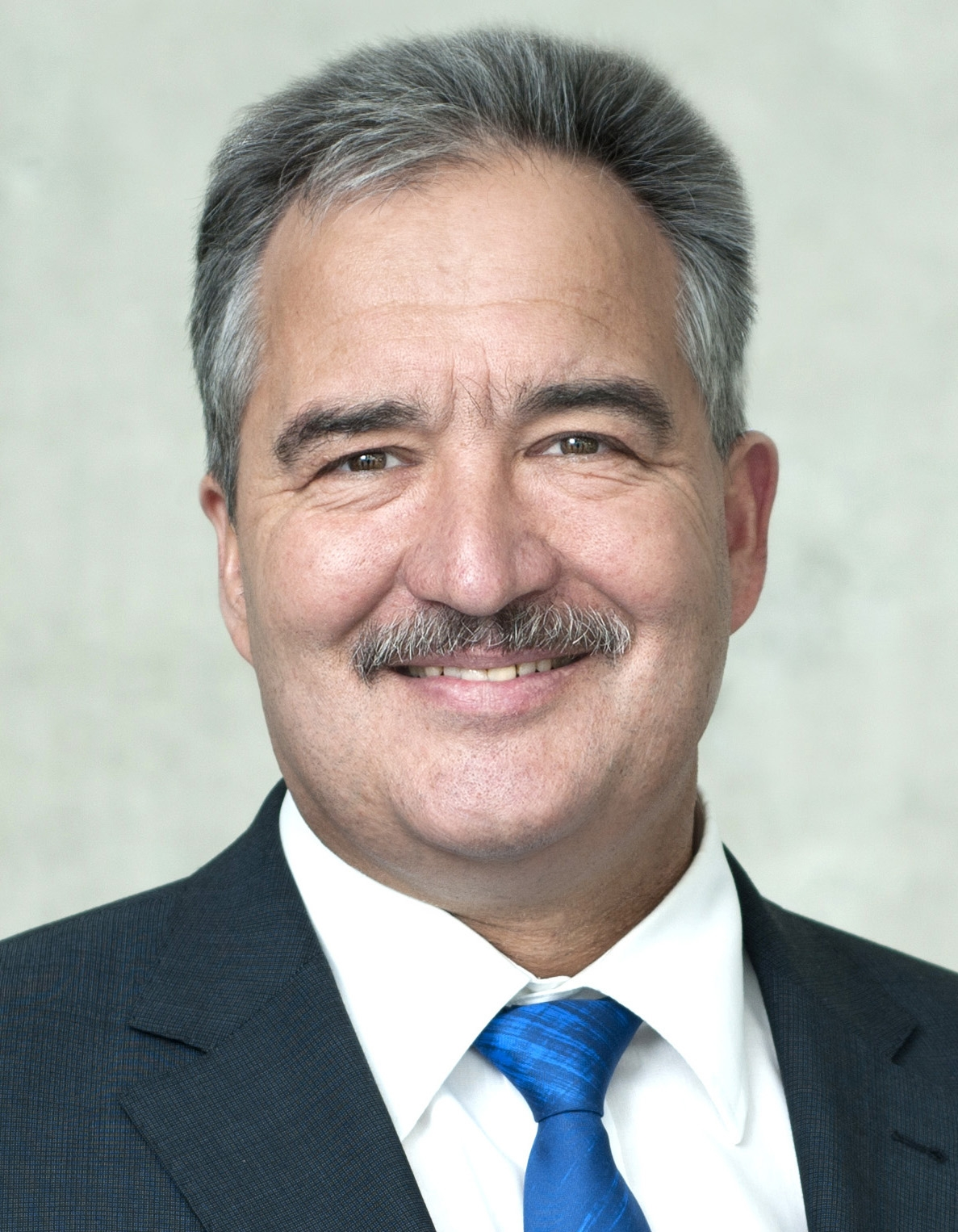
- Rief in 2013

Member of the Bundestag; for Biberach
- In office 27 October 2009 – 25 March 2025
- Preceded by: Franz Romer
- Succeeded by: Wolfgang Dahler

Personal details
- Born: 13 April 1960 (age 66) Illertissen, West Germany
- Party: Christian Democratic Union
- Children: 3

Josef Rief (born 13 April 1960) is a German politician of the Christian Democratic Union (CDU) who has been serving as a member of the Bundestag from the state of Baden-Württemberg since 2009.

== Political career ==
Rief became a member of the Bundestag in the 2009 German federal election. He is a member of the Budget Committee and the Committee for Family, Senior Citizens, Women and Youth. In this capacity, he serves as his parliamentary group's rapporteur on the annual budget of the Federal Ministry of Health.

In addition to his committee assignments, Rief has been a substitute member of the German delegation to the Parliamentary Assembly of the Council of Europe (PACE) since 2018. In this capacity, he serves on the Committee on Social Affairs, Health and Sustainable Development and the Sub-Committee on the European Social Charter. In 2024 Rief announced, that he isn't seeking re-election for Bundestag.

== Political positions ==
In June 2017, Rief voted against Germany's introduction of same-sex marriage.
