= Martin Gerster =

German politician (born 1971)

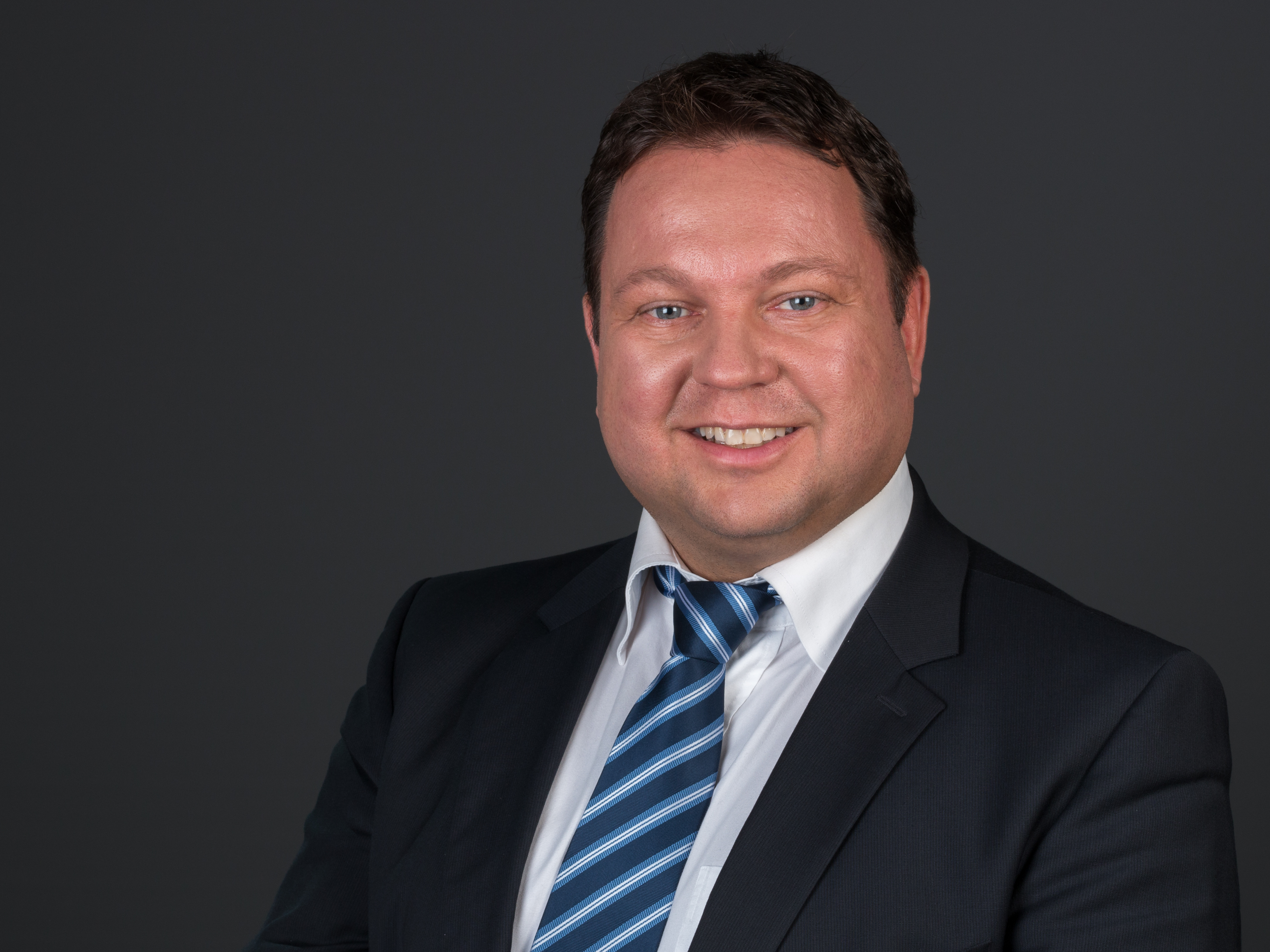
- Martin Gerster in 2014

Member of the Bundestag
- Incumbent
- Assumed office 2005

Personal details
- Born: 30 August 1971 (age 55) Biberach an der Riß, West Germany (now Germany)
- Party: SPD
- Education: University of Mainz
- Occupation: Politician
- Website: http://www.martin-gerster.de/

Martin Gerster (born 30 August 1971) is a German politician of the Social Democratic Party (SPD) who has been serving as a member of the Bundestag from the state of Baden-Württemberg since 2005.

== Early life and career ==
After graduating from the Pestalozzi-Gymnasium in Biberach in 1991, Gerster first completed a traineeship at Radio 7 and then began studying political science, history and economics at the Johannes Gutenberg University in Mainz in 1994, graduating with a Master's degree in 2002.

During his studies, he worked as a freelance editor for Radio 7, the Schwäbische Zeitung and ZDF. He also worked at the Democratic National Committee in Washington and at "Hillary Clinton for Senate" in New York from 1999 to 2001. He was a member of the SPD campaign team for the 2001 state elections in Baden-Württemberg. From 2002 to 2005, he was parliamentary advisor (Fraktionsreferent) to the SPD parliamentary group in the state parliament of Baden-Württemberg.

From 2006 to 2014, he was president of the German Sports Acrobatics Federation and has been its honorary president since then. Since 2018, Gerster has been vice president on the board of the THW Federal Association.

== Political career ==
In 2005, he stood for election to the Bundestag in the Biberach constituency and was elected to the German Bundestag via the state list. In the 16th German Bundestag, he was initially a member of the Interior Committee and the Sports Committee. In September 2007, Gerster moved from the Interior Committee to the Finance Committee.

In 2009, he was again elected to the 17th German Bundestag via the state list and continued his work in the finance committee and the sports committee. He was also spokesman for the SPD parliamentary group. He was also deputy spokesman for his parliamentary group's "Strategies against right-wing extremism" working group. In 2012, Martin Gerster succeeded Lothar Binding on the Budget Committee and was responsible for the individual budget of the Federal Ministry for Economic Cooperation and Development. In this capacity, Gerster was also a member of the Supervisory Board of the German Corporation for International Cooperation.

After the 2013 German federal election, Gerster moved into the 18th Bundestag. He is a member of the Budget Committee and, as his parliamentary group's rapporteur, oversees the annual budget of the Federal Ministry of the Interior, Building and Community. He is also a member - and since September 2016 spokesman for his parliamentary group - of the Audit Committee.

In the 19th German Bundestag, Gerster is a member of the Budget Committee, the Audit Committee and the so-called Confidential Committee (Vertrauensgremium) of the Budget Committee, which provides budgetary supervision for Germany's three intelligence services, BND, BfV and MAD. Gerster is vice-chairman in the Budget Committee and chairman in the Audit Committee. In addition, he is a full member of the Confidence Committee and is a deputy member of the Committee on Building, Housing, Urban Development and Communities, the Committee on the Interior and Home Affairs, the Committee on the Digital Agenda, as well as the Board of Trustees of the Federal Agency for Civic Education.

Gerster plays defense for the FC Bundestag and participated in the 2014 European Championship in Vienna.

== Other activities ==
- Friedrich Ebert Foundation (FES), Member of the Board of Trustees
- German Corporation for International Cooperation (GIZ), Member of the Supervisory Board (2012-2013)
- Federal Agency for Civic Education (BPB), Member of the Board of Trustees (2006-2009, 2013-2017)
