= Billafingen =

Coordinates: 47°49′59″N 9°08′22″E

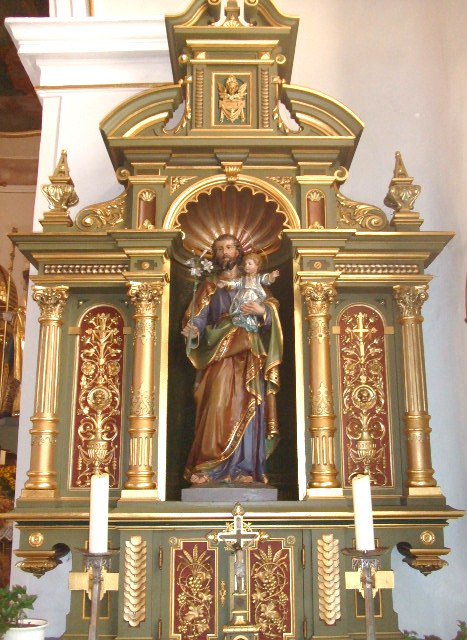
Altar of St. Joseph, Billafingen, Germany.

Billafingen is a village that is part of Owingen in the Bodensee district, Germany, close to Überlingen. It was first mentioned in 970 and merged with Owingen in 1975. Its population is around 700. It has won the village improvement competition "Unser Dorf soll schöner werden" ('Make our village more beautiful') several times.
