= Vogt, Baden-Württemberg =

Vogt
- Municipality
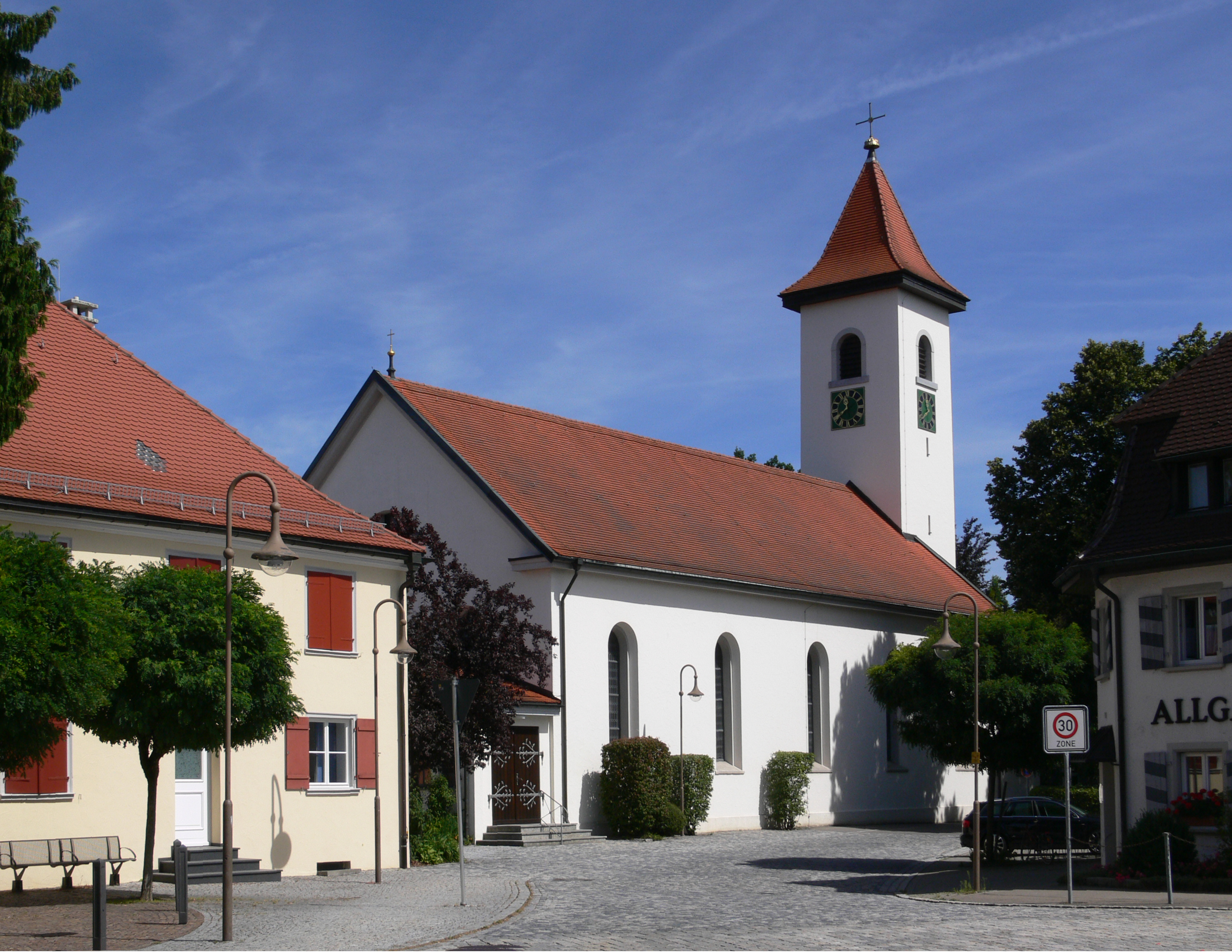
- Church of Saint Anne

- Coat of arms

- Location of Vogt within Ravensburg district
- Interactive map of Vogt
- Location within Germany Location within Baden-Württemberg
- Coordinates: 47°46′33″N 09°46′01″E
- Country: Germany
- State: Baden-Württemberg
- Admin. region: Tübingen
- District: Ravensburg

Government
  - Mayor (2018–26): Peter Smigoc

Area
  - Total: 22.3 km^{2} (8.6 sq mi)
- Elevation: 681 m (2,234 ft)

Population (2025-12-31)
  - Total: 4,788
  - Density: 215/km^{2} (556/sq mi)
- Time zone: UTC+01:00 (CET)
  - Summer (DST): UTC+02:00 (CEST)
- Postal codes: 88267
- Dialling codes: 07529
- Vehicle registration: RV
- Website: www.vogt.de

Vogt (German pronunciation: [foːkt]) is a village in the district of Ravensburg in Baden-Württemberg in Germany.
