= Anja Reinalter =

German politician (born 1970)

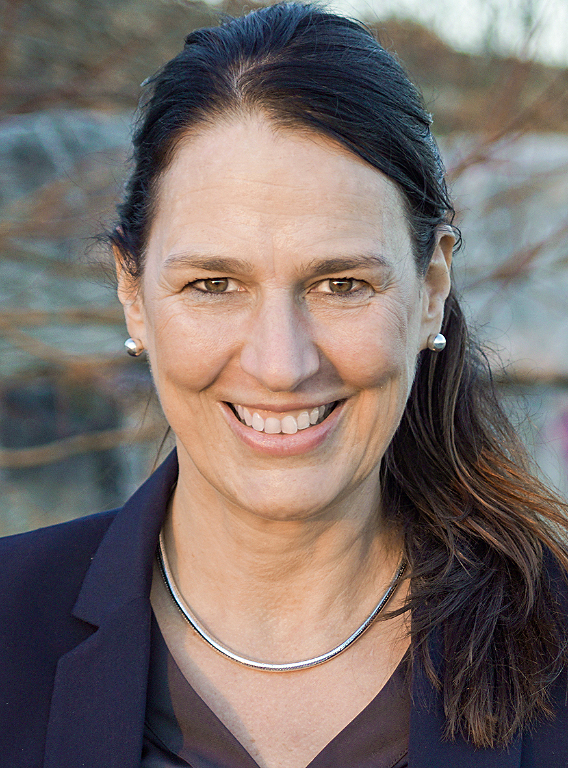
- Reinalter in 2021

Member of the Bundestag
- Incumbent
- Assumed office 26 October 2021

Personal details
- Born: 1 May 1970 (age 55) Laupheim, Germany
- Party: Alliance 90/The Greens

Anja Reinalter (born 1 May 1970) is a German politician. Reinalter became a member of the Bundestag in the 2021 German federal election. She is affiliated with the Alliance 90/The Greens party.
