= Achberg =

- Municipality
- Coat of arms

- Location of Achberg within Ravensburg district
- Interactive map of Achberg
- Location within Germany Location within Baden-Württemberg
- Coordinates: 47°36′54″N 09°43′01″E
- Country: Germany
- State: Baden-Württemberg
- Admin. region: Tübingen
- District: Ravensburg

Government
  - Mayor (2021–29): Tobias Walch

Area
  - Total: 12.92 km^{2} (4.99 sq mi)
- Elevation: 505 m (1,657 ft)

Population (2025-12-31)
  - Total: 1,713
  - Density: 132.6/km^{2} (343.4/sq mi)
- Time zone: UTC+01:00 (CET)
  - Summer (DST): UTC+02:00 (CEST)
- Postal codes: 88147
- Dialling codes: 08380
- Vehicle registration: RV

Achberg is a municipality located in the Argen river on the border between Baden-Württemberg and Bavaria in the southern part of the Ravensburg district. The municipality's name is derived from Achberg Castle. It shares an administrative association with the town of Wangen im Allgäu and the municipality of Amtzell.

== Geography ==
=== Municipal Structure ===
The municipality of Achberg consists of the parish villages Esseratsweiler and Siberatsweiler as well as the hamlets Doberatsweiler, Pechtensweiler, Gunderatweiler, Liebenweiler, Baind, Bahlings, Isigatweiler, Regnitz, and Duznau. In addition, there are residential areas Buflings, Englitz, Siggenreute, Storeute, Frauenreute, and Rankenbühl. Another residential area is Achberg, consisting of the castle with administrative building and domain.

Esseratsweiler and Siberatsweiler, along with their associated areas, historically belonged to the ecclesiastical jurisdiction of the Archdiocese of Freiburg in Hohenzollern, but pastorally have been under the care of the Diocese of Rottenburg-Stuttgart since 2007.

=== Protected Areas ===
Within the municipal area of Achberg, there are currently three nature reserves: "Argen", "Hermannsberger Weiher", and "Regnitzer Weiher", as well as the landscape conservation areas "Achberg" and "Moor- und Hügelland südlich Wangen im Allgäu". Also designated are the Natura 2000 site "Argen und Feuchtgebiete bei Neukirch und Langnau" and eight specific natural monuments as of 21 September 2023.

== History ==
=== Middle Ages and Early Modern Period ===
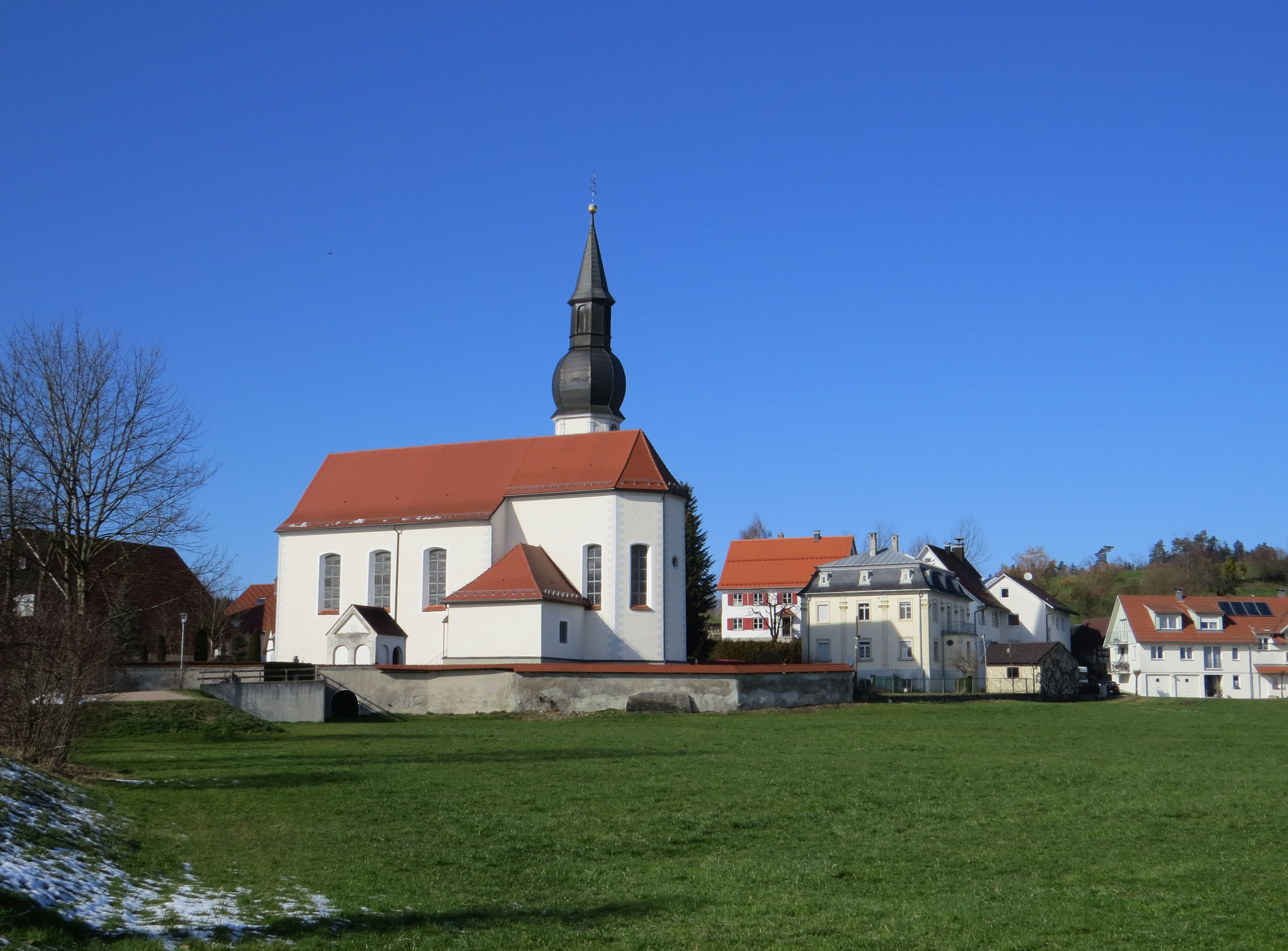
St. Michael Church

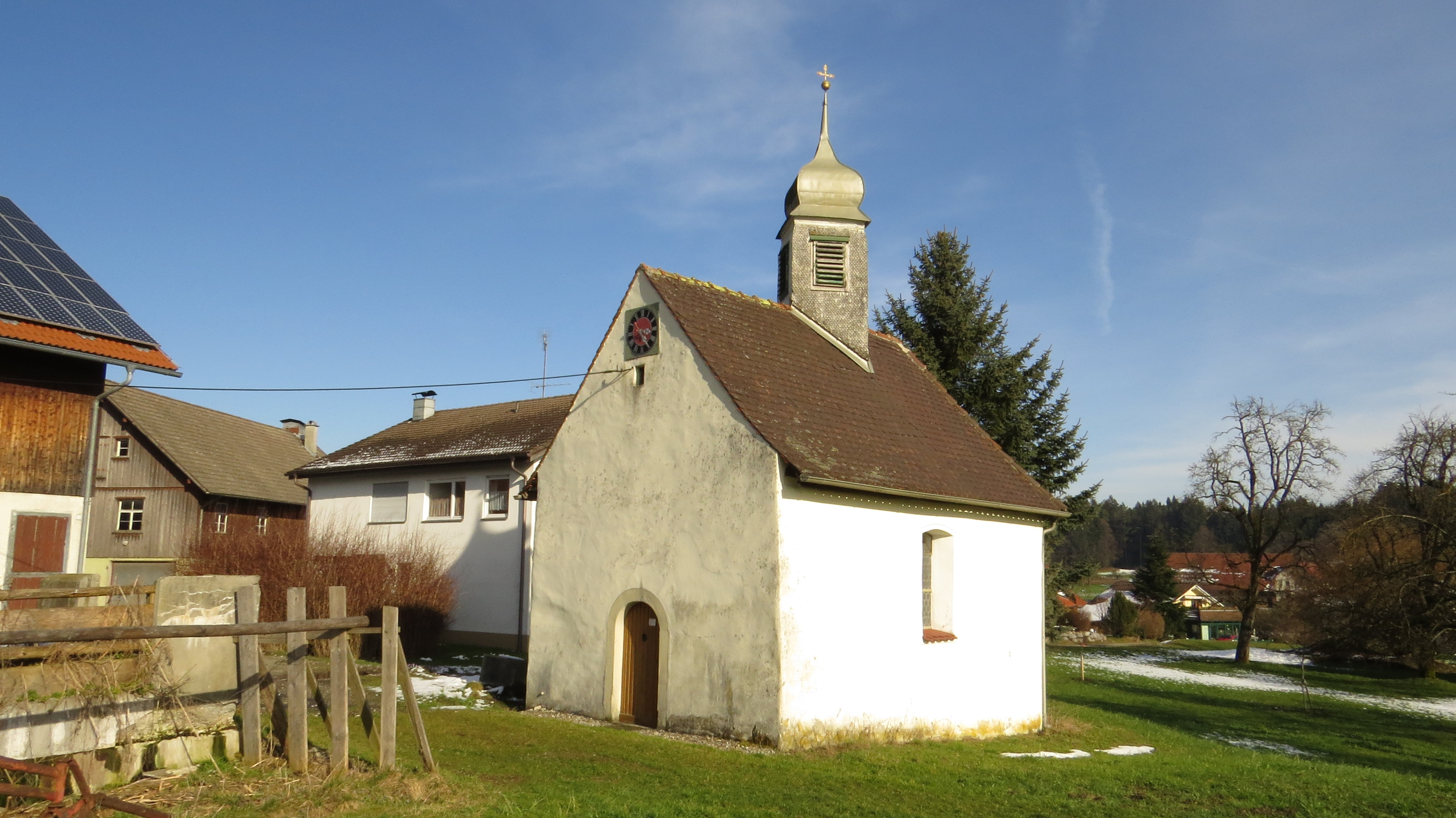
Chapel in Doberatsweiler

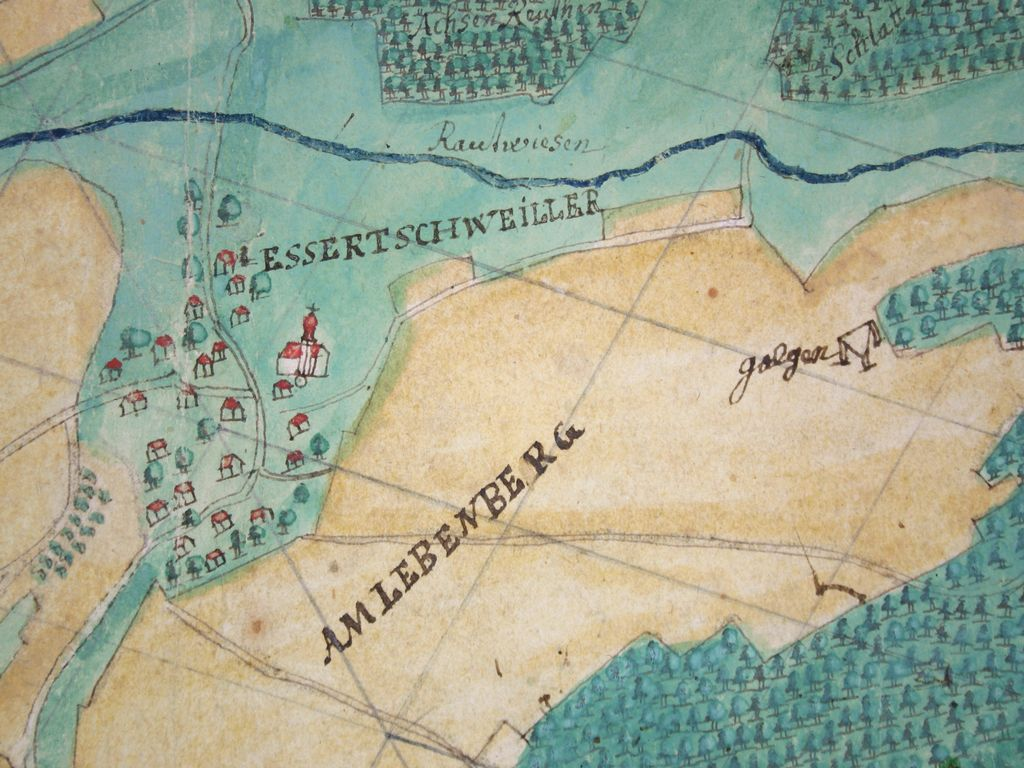
Esseratsweiler on a map around 1700

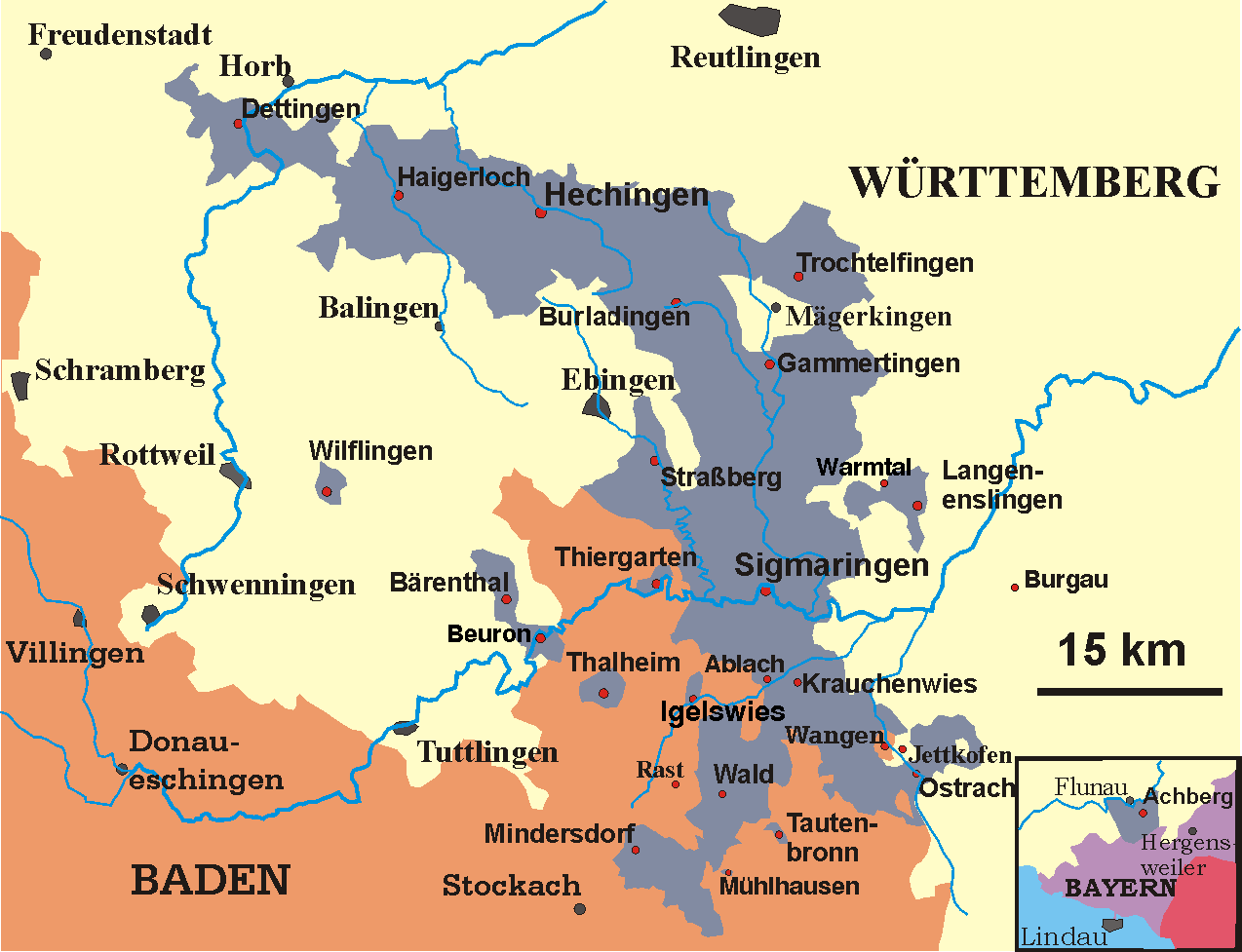
Map of the Hohenzollern Territories (1930), Achberg exclave in the box at the bottom right.

The first locality mentioned in records is Pechtensweiler in 839. Achberg is first mentioned in documents in 1194. The Lords of Achberg were vassals of the Counts of Veringen in 1197 and 1239. They were succeeded by the Truchsessen von Waldburg (1235–1335) and the Lords of Molpertshaus (1335–1352). Beginning in 1352, the domain was an Austrian fief; from 1366 to 1392, it belonged to the Öder family. In 1412, the Counts of Königsegg took over, followed by the Freiherren von Syrgenstein in 1530. In 1691, Achberg was sold by Josef Franz Ferdinand von Syrgenstein to the Teutonic Order. Until 1805, it was under the jurisdiction of the Landkomturei Altshausen of the Teutonic Bailiwick of Swabia-Alsace-Burgundy.

=== Since the Beginning of the 19th Century ===
As part of the secularization, Bavaria took possession of the Achberg domain in December 1805, but through the Rheinbund Treaty of 1806, the castle and domain were awarded to the Principality of Hohenzollern-Sigmaringen as an exclave. When the principality fell to the Kingdom of Prussia in 1850, Achberg, as the southernmost part of the Hohenzollern territories, became the southernmost part of Prussia. During the German War of 1866, Achberg was briefly occupied by Bavarian troops. From 1806 to 1854, the Oberamt Achberg, congruent with the municipal area, was its own Hohenzollern district. It subsequently belonged to the Oberamt Sigmaringen, which became the old district of Sigmaringen in 1925. In 1945, Achberg was in the French occupation zone and thus became part of post-war Württemberg-Hohenzollern, which merged into the state of Baden-Württemberg in 1952. On 1 January 1969, Achberg was initially assigned to the former Württemberg district of Wangen and, with this, as part of the district and municipal reform on 1 January 1973, to the newly defined district of Ravensburg.

=== Religion ===
Achberg is traditionally Catholic. The first Christian structures emerged with the foundation of the Diocese of Constance around the year 585. The two Roman Catholic parishes belonging to the former Hohenzollern exclave Achberg, St. Michael in Esseratsweiler and St. Georg in Siberatsweiler, were merged in 2017 into the parish of St. Michael and St. Georg. Although the parish of St. Michael and St. Georg in Achberg legally remains part of the Sigmaringen-Meßkirch deanery and thus of the Archdiocese of Freiburg, it is now de facto part of the pastoral unit 15 "An der Argen" in the Allgäu-Oberschwaben deanery.

== Politics ==
=== Mayor ===
1997–2021: Johannes Aschauer (independent) since 2021: Tobias Walch (independent)

=== Municipal Council ===
The municipal council election on 26 May 2019, resulted in the following outcome:

List	Seats
Bürgerliste (Citizens' List)	6
Grüne Offene Liste (Green Open List)	3
FREIE WÄHLER (FREE VOTERS)	1

The voter turnout was 67.84%. The municipal council consists of six men and four women.

=== Coat of Arms ===
Coat of arms of the municipality of Achberg

Explanation of the Coat of Arms: Before 1968, the municipality bore, on a golden shield, an eight-pointed black star above a green trimount. These figures already appeared in a municipal seal used around 1900, but the colors of the coat of arms were apparently determined later. The unusual eight-pointed mount was based on a folk etymological interpretation of the place name, while the star likely served only as a filler. On 1 January 1969, the municipality adopted the current coat of arms, which is symbolized by the representation of the trimount with the wavy stripe, indicating "mountain at the Ach." The black cross on a silver field is the symbol of the Teutonic Order, in whose possession the domain of Achberg was from 1691 to 1806. The black-and-white colors of the flag also recall Achberg's affiliation with Hohenzollern from 1806 to 1968, most recently as an exclave of the Sigmaringen district. The coat of arms and flag were approved by the Ministry of the Interior on 7 October 1968.

== Cultural Monuments ==
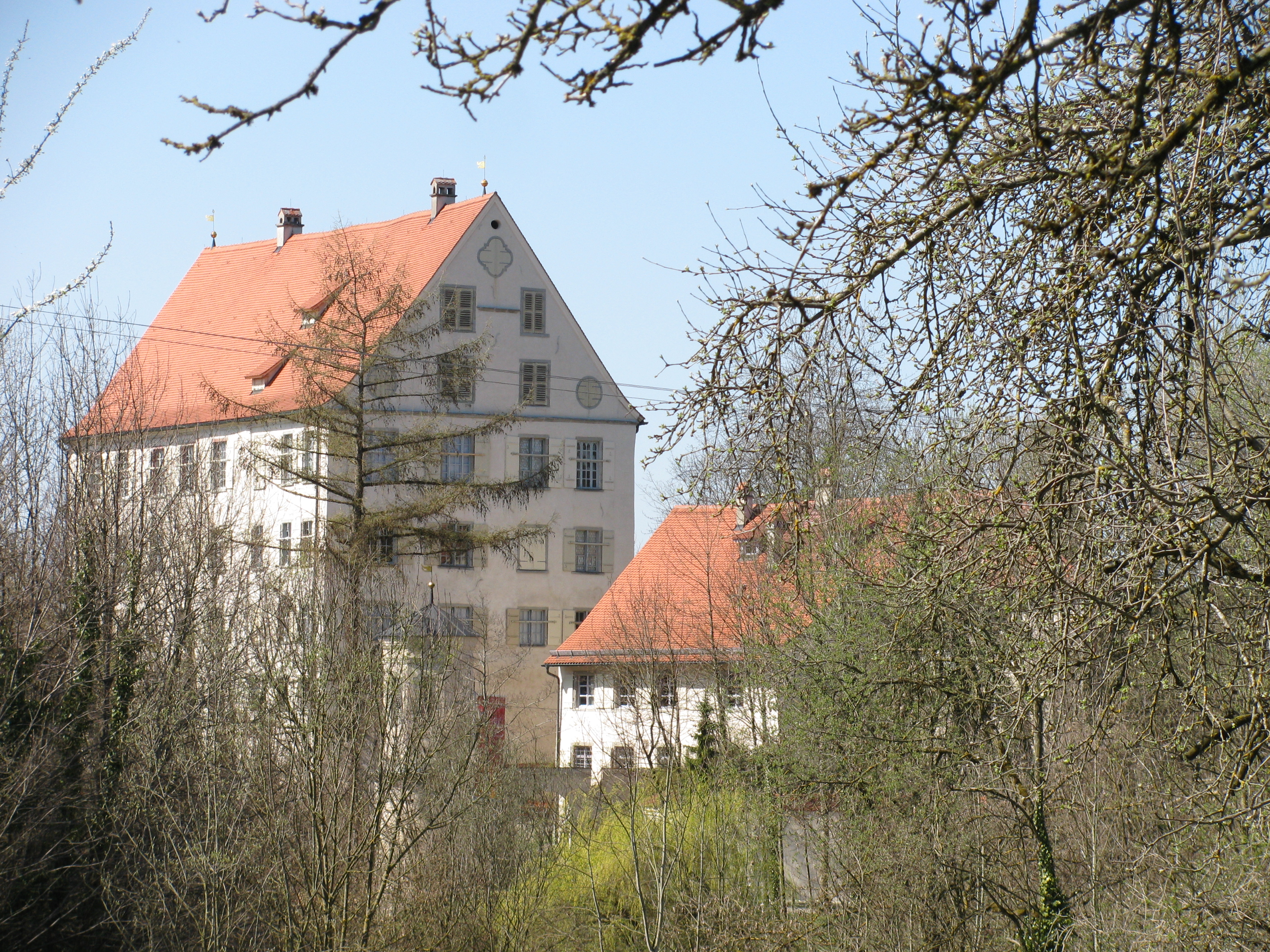
Achberg Castle

Today, Achberg Castle is owned by the Ravensburg District and is used for exhibitions from the county's extensive art collection, as well as for special exhibitions and concerts.
