= Aichstetten =

- Municipality
- Coat of arms

- Location of Aichstetten within Ravensburg district
- Interactive map of Aichstetten
- Location within Germany Location within Baden-Württemberg
- Coordinates: 47°53′36″N 10°04′45″E
- Country: Germany
- State: Baden-Württemberg
- Admin. region: Tübingen
- District: Ravensburg

Government
  - Mayor (2021–29): Hubert Erath

Area
  - Total: 33.74 km^{2} (13.03 sq mi)
- Elevation: 618 m (2,028 ft)

Population (2025-12-31)
  - Total: 2,850
  - Density: 84.5/km^{2} (219/sq mi)
- Time zone: UTC+01:00 (CET)
  - Summer (DST): UTC+02:00 (CEST)
- Postal codes: 88317
- Dialling codes: 07565
- Vehicle registration: RV
- Website: www.aichstetten.de

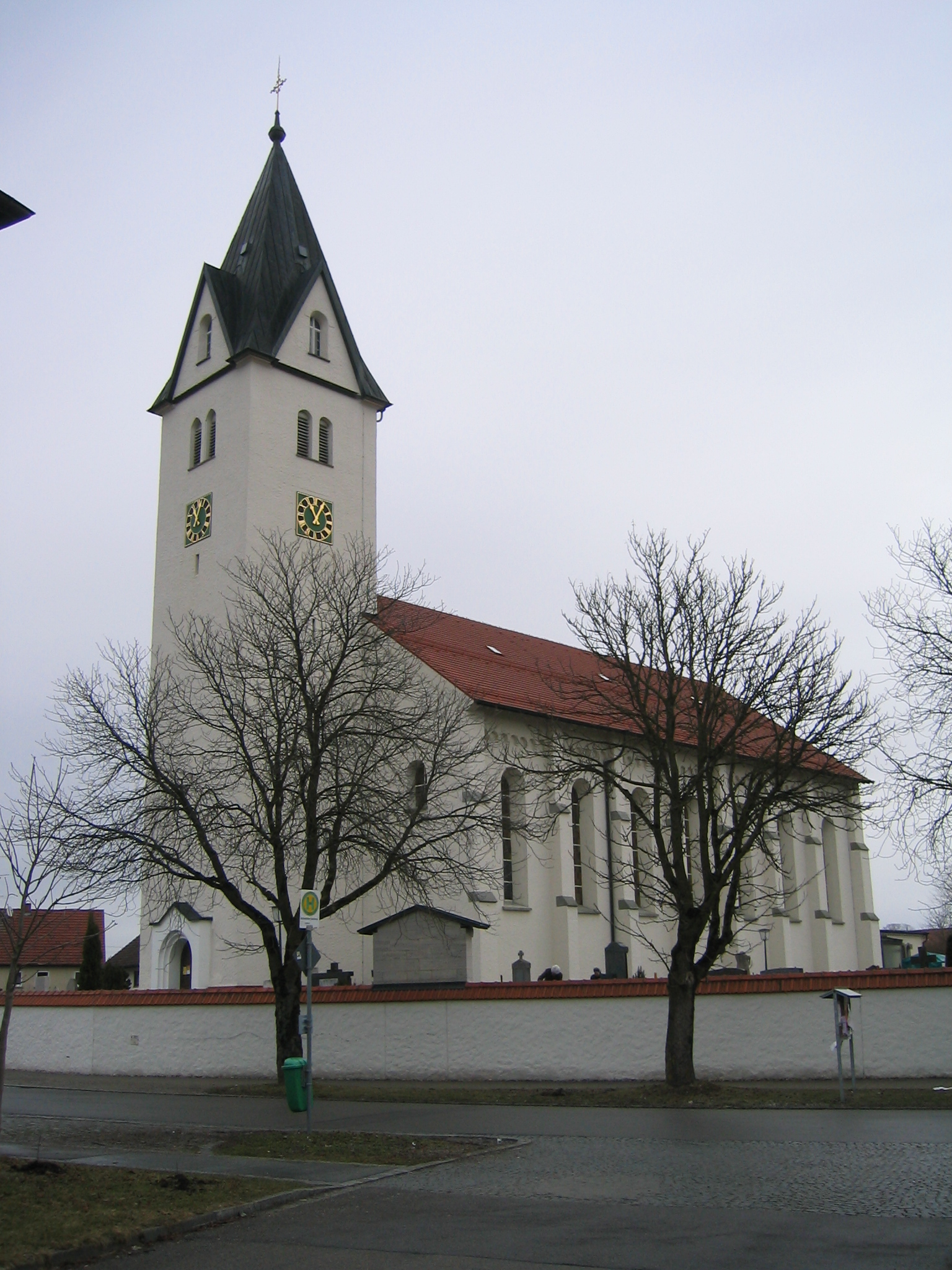
A Catholic church in Aichstetten

Aichstetten (German pronunciation: [aɪçˈʃtɛtn̩]) is a municipality in the district of Ravensburg in Baden-Württemberg in Germany.

== Transportation ==
Aichstetten is served by the Leutkirch-Memmingen railway.
