= Aitrach =

- Municipality
- Coat of arms

- Location of Aitrach within Ravensburg district
- Interactive map of Aitrach
- Location within Germany Location within Baden-Württemberg
- Coordinates: 47°56′24″N 10°05′24″E
- Country: Germany
- State: Baden-Württemberg
- Admin. region: Tübingen
- District: Ravensburg

Government
  - Mayor (2023–31): Thomas Kellenberger (CDU)

Area
  - Total: 30.20 km^{2} (11.66 sq mi)
- Elevation: 596 m (1,955 ft)

Population (2025-12-31)
  - Total: 3,059
  - Density: 101.3/km^{2} (262.3/sq mi)
- Time zone: UTC+01:00 (CET)
  - Summer (DST): UTC+02:00 (CEST)
- Postal codes: 88319
- Dialling codes: 07565
- Vehicle registration: RV
- Website: www.aitrach.de

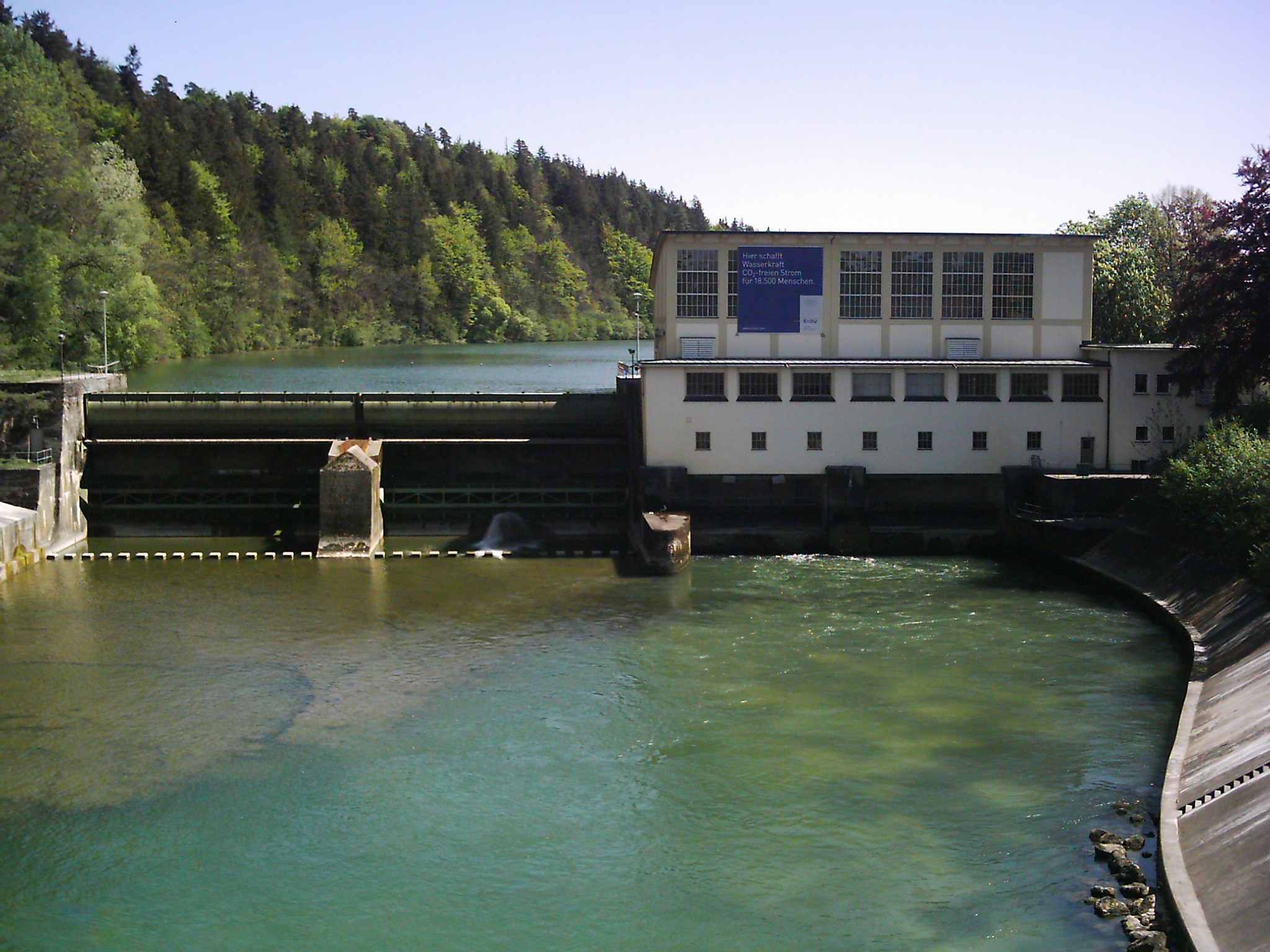
Hydro-electric power station at the Iller

Aitrach is a municipality in the district of Ravensburg in Baden-Württemberg in Germany.

Aitrach was first documented in a document from the Abbey of Saint Gall of 838 as Eitraha.

It is located where the homonymous river and the Iller join.
