= Bergatreute =

- Municipality
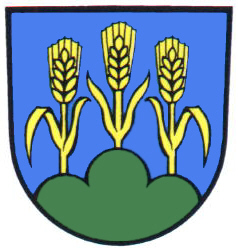
- Coat of arms

- Location of Bergatreute within Ravensburg district
- Interactive map of Bergatreute
- Location within Germany Location within Baden-Württemberg
- Coordinates: 47°51′02″N 09°44′52″E
- Country: Germany
- State: Baden-Württemberg
- Admin. region: Tübingen
- District: Ravensburg

Government
  - Mayor (2018–26): Helmfried Schäfer

Area
  - Total: 23.16 km^{2} (8.94 sq mi)
- Elevation: 606 m (1,988 ft)

Population (2025-12-31)
  - Total: 3,176
  - Density: 137.1/km^{2} (355.2/sq mi)
- Time zone: UTC+01:00 (CET)
  - Summer (DST): UTC+02:00 (CEST)
- Postal codes: 88368
- Dialling codes: 07527
- Vehicle registration: RV
- Website: www.bergatreute.de

Bergatreute is a municipality in the district of Ravensburg in Baden-Württemberg in Germany.
