= Amtzell =

- Municipality
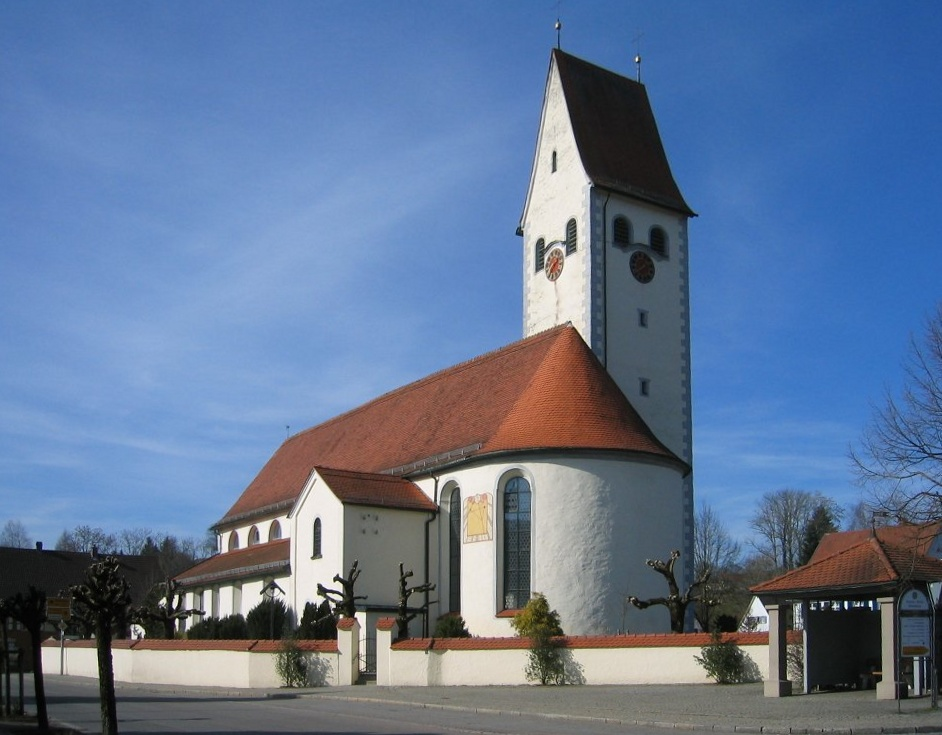
- St. John the Baptist church

- Coat of arms

- Location of Amtzell within Ravensburg district
- Interactive map of Amtzell
- Location within Germany Location within Baden-Württemberg
- Coordinates: 47°42′22″N 09°44′53″E
- Country: Germany
- State: Baden-Württemberg
- Admin. region: Tübingen
- District: Ravensburg

Government
  - Mayor (2022–30): Manuela Oswald

Area
  - Total: 30.56 km^{2} (11.80 sq mi)
- Elevation: 556 m (1,824 ft)

Population (2025-12-31)
  - Total: 4,241
  - Density: 138.8/km^{2} (359.4/sq mi)
- Time zone: UTC+01:00 (CET)
  - Summer (DST): UTC+02:00 (CEST)
- Postal codes: 88279
- Dialling codes: 07520
- Vehicle registration: RV
- Website: www.amtzell.de

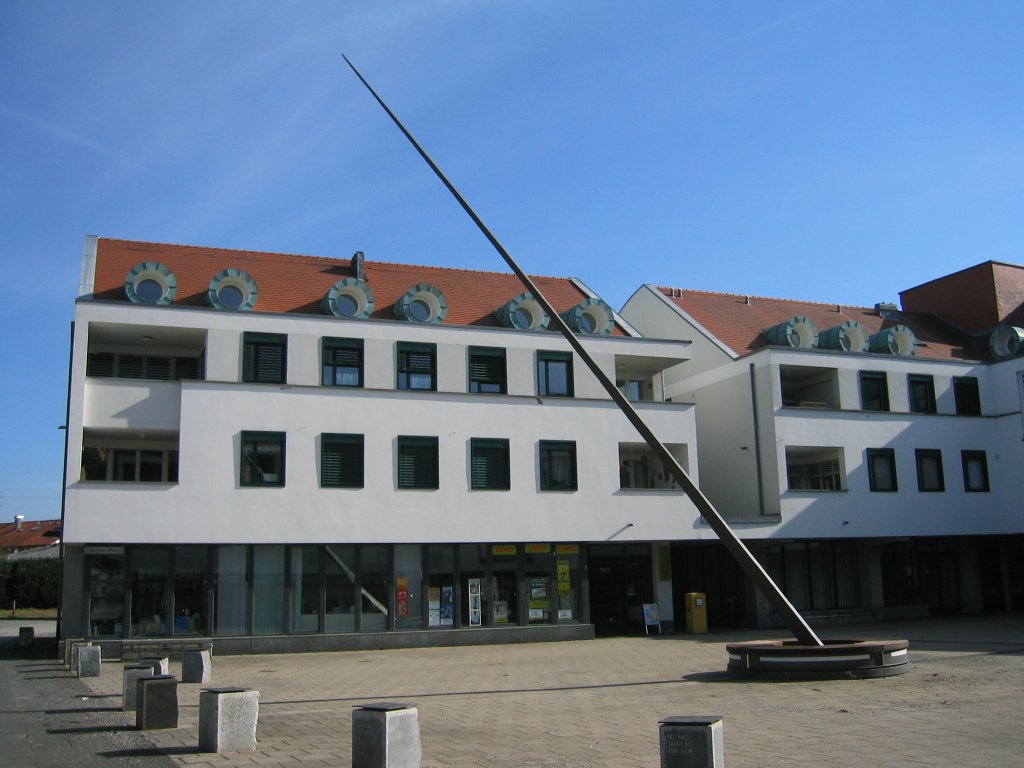
A large horizontal sundial in Amtzell

Amtzell is a municipality in the district of Ravensburg in Baden-Württemberg in Germany.
