= Upper Swabian Baroque Route =

The Barockstraße's trademark roadsign

The Upper Swabian Baroque Route (Oberschwäbische Barockstraße) is a tourist theme route through Upper Swabia, following the themes of "nature, culture, baroque". The route has a length of about 500 km (approximately 310 miles). It was established in 1966, being one of the first theme routes in Germany. There is an extension to the route into Switzerland and Austria around Lake Constance.

Its logo depicts a yellow putto on a green background, putti being typical of the Baroque Era.

== Origin ==
After the end of the Thirty Years' War and its ravages in 1648, followed by the Counter-Reformation instigated by the Catholic Church, an explosion of building works took place in the region of Upper Swabia. Immigrants to depopulated areas within Upper Swabia contributed to an economic upturn, which made it possible even for the owners of the smallest villages to secure sufficient funds to restore, extend and enhance the already existing buildings in Baroque style. This included monasteries as well as secular buildings such as castles and commercial buildings. The result of this is today called Upper Swabian Baroque. It lasted from ca. 1650 until the French Revolution.

The nobility, whose territories were mostly of a small or only modest size, converted its dwelling places to Baroque style, utilising existing structures. Some new buildings were erected by the nobility, the result of which, however, often did not come close to the quality and extent of those erected by the clergy. This was due to the nobility's lack of financial means. The monasteries, on the other hand, did have larger funds at their disposal as their respective territories were considerably larger than those of secular lords which meant that they could employ more dependants for the constructions work under the rules of feudal obligations (socage). Also, the monks themselves were unpaid and some of the artistic works were carried out by monks themselves.

The re-organization of Europe under Napoleon at the beginning of the 19th century (also known as German Mediatisation), however, meant that the Imperial Abbeys, the Free Imperial Cities and the territories ruled by Imperial Knights (Reichsritter) lost their independence and their income. Many buildings were converted into barracks, schools, psychiatric hospitals or even manufacturing sites.

Only in the 20th century, efforts have been made to save and restore these monuments of the past.

== Survey ==
Some of the main attractions on the route are:

- Ulm with its cathedral.
- Wiblingen Abbey - library.
- Laupheim - parish church Sts. Peter and Paul; Großlaupheim Castle and its museum; castle Kleinlaupheim.
- Biberach an der Riß - parish church St Martin.
- Steinhausen - parish church Sts. Peter and Paul (also a place of pilgrimage), often referred to as being the "most beautiful village church in the world."
- Bad Schussenried - Schussenried Abbey with library in Rococo-style.
- Rot an der Rot - Rot an der Rot Abbey.
- Obermarchtal - Marchtal Abbey with minster, often referred to as "little Versaille."
- Zwiefalten - pilgrimage place with minster.
- Bad Wurzach - the castle with the most beautiful staircase in Baroque-style in Upper Swabia.
- Sigmaringen - Sigmaringen Castle.
- Meßkirch - with castle and church.
- Kißlegg - Old and New Castle; Parish church Sts. Gallus and Ulrich.
- Langenargen - Baroque church.
- Friedrichshafen - Hofen Monastery.
- Meersburg - Meersburg Castle, the oldest castle in Germany, and New Castle, a baroque castle.
- Überlingen - city and minster.
- Ravensburg - also known as the city of towers and gates; monastery church in Weissenau Abbey.
- Weingarten - Weingarten Abbey and basilica which contains the famous pipe organ by Joseph Gabler.
- Tannheim - parish church St Martin in early Baroque-style.
- Memmingen - monastery complex, built in Baroque-style.

=== Examples of Upper Swabian Baroque ===
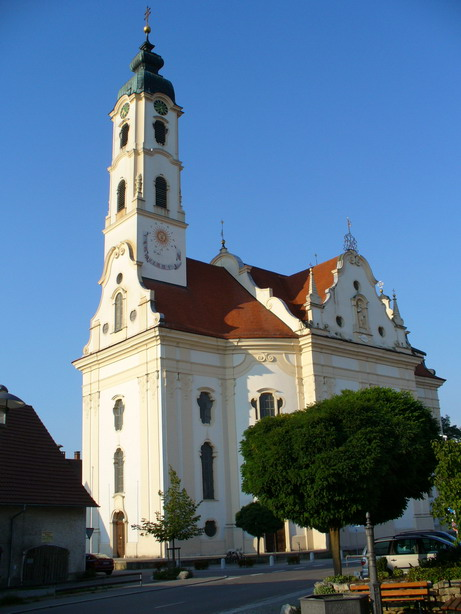
Steinhausen, pilgrimage church

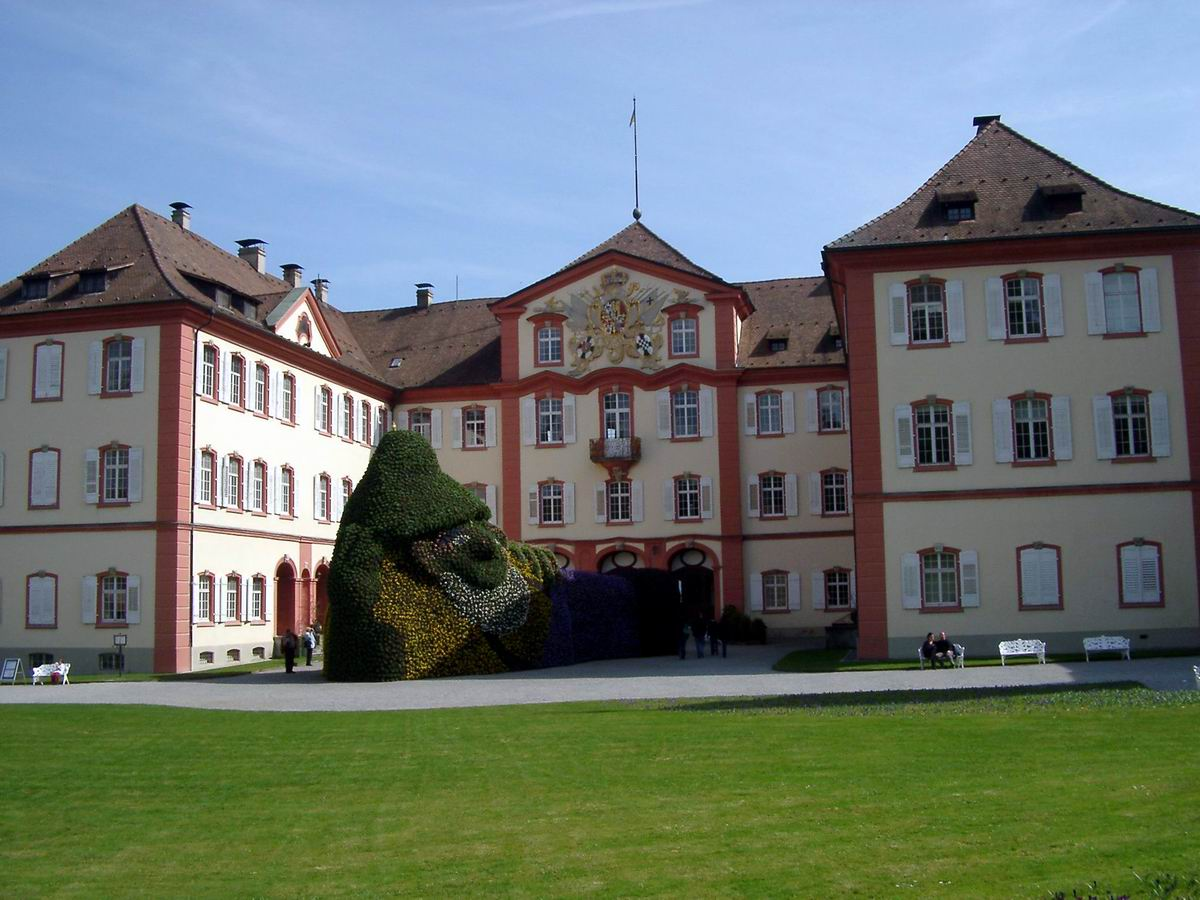
Castle Mainau

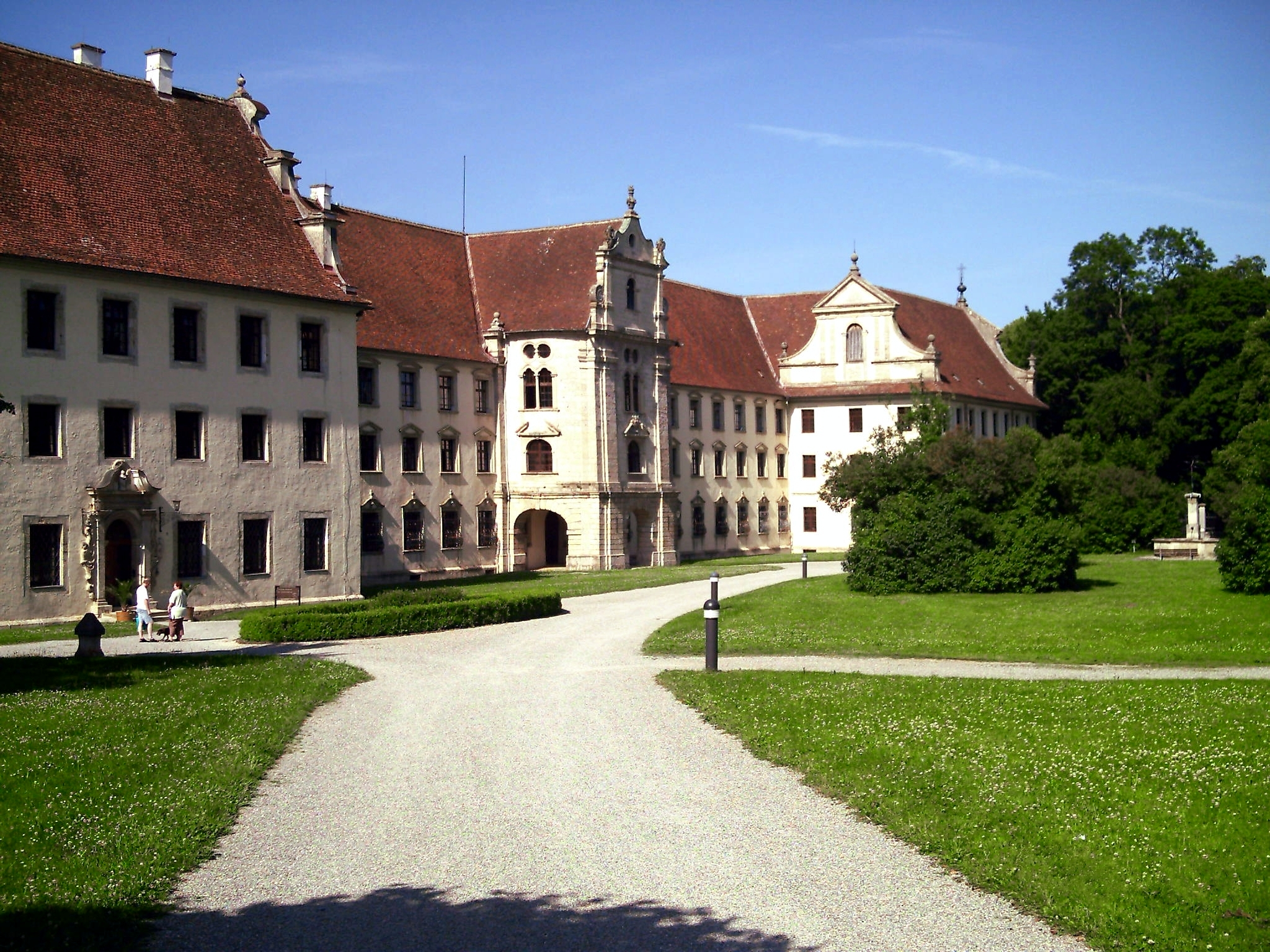
Obermarchtal, monastery

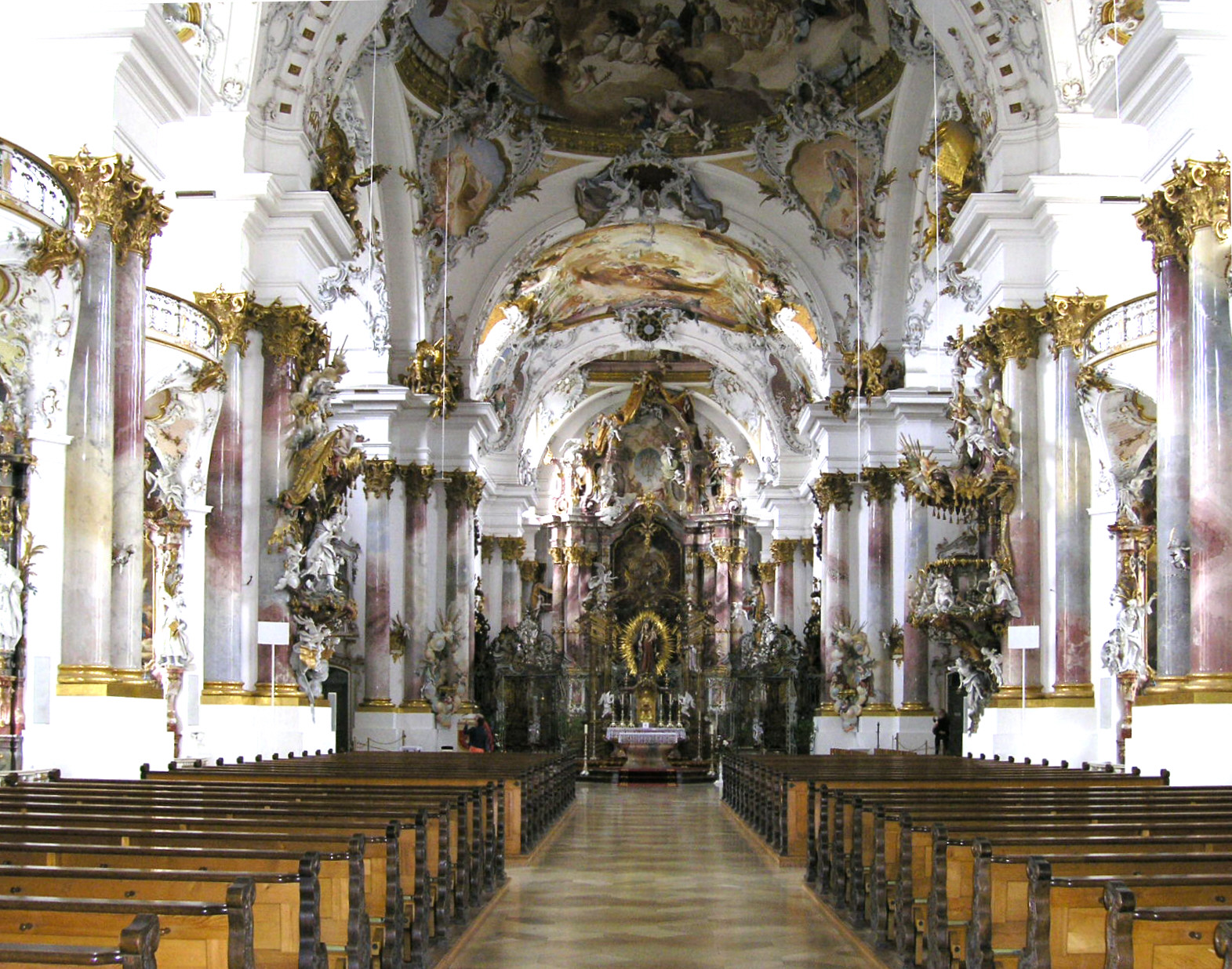
Zwiefalten, abbey church

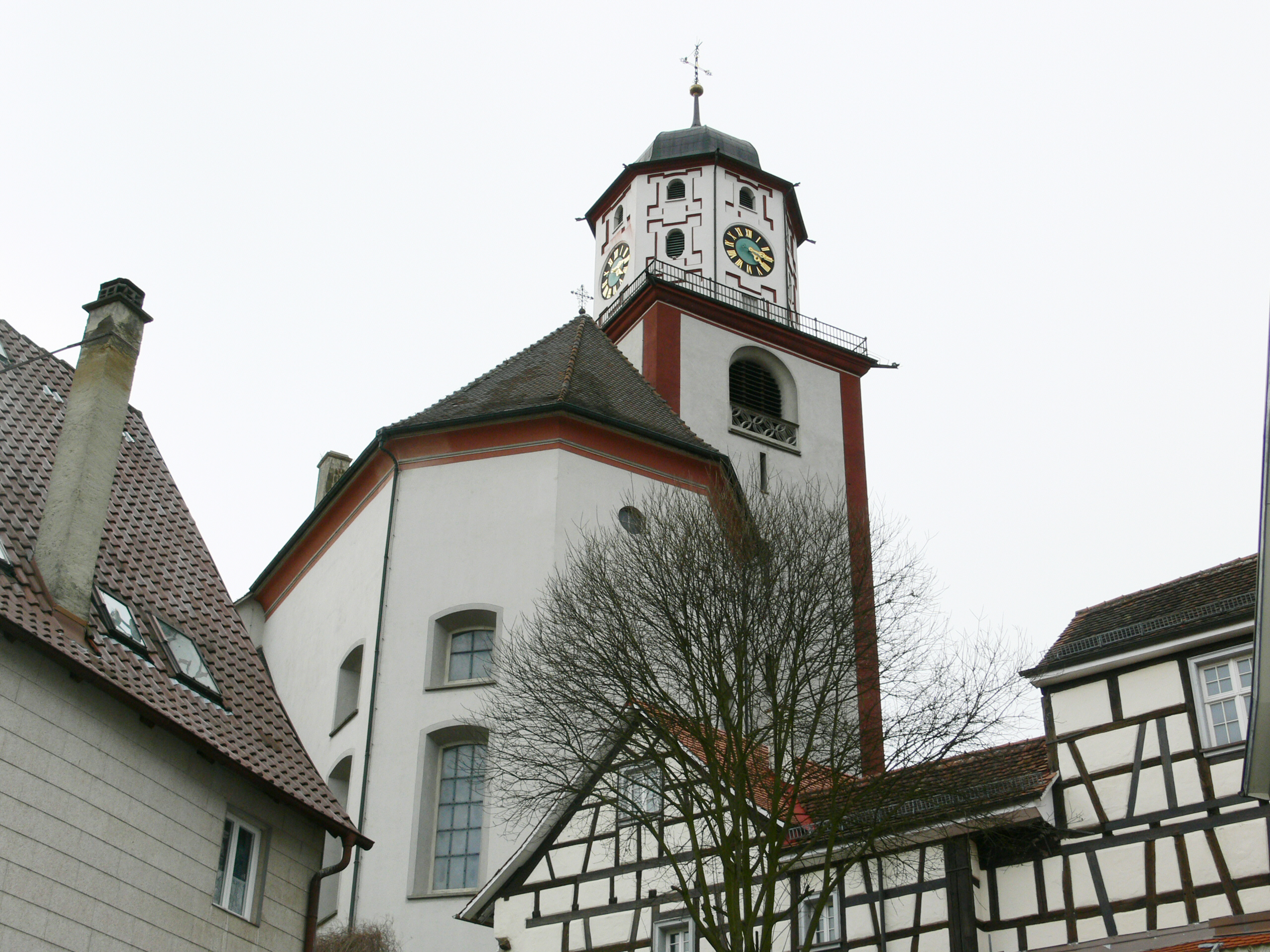
Meßkirch, parish church

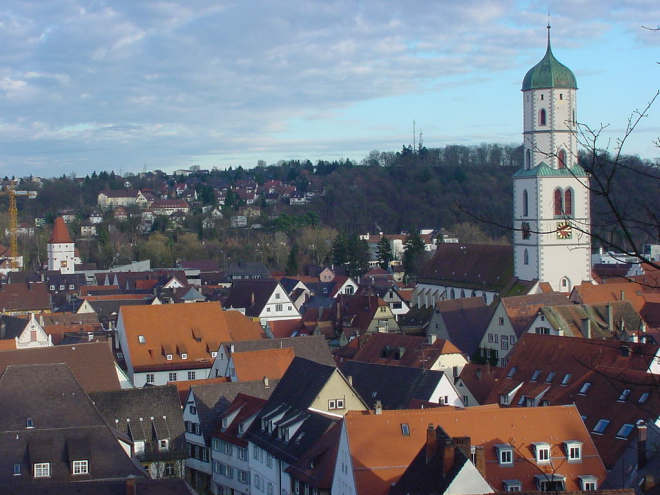
Biberach an der Riss

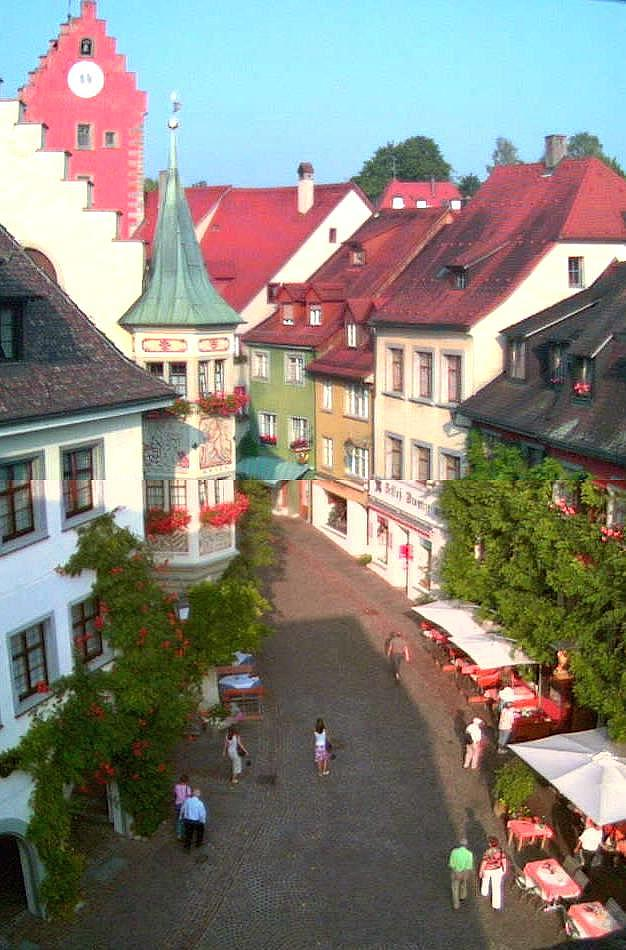
Meersburg, old city

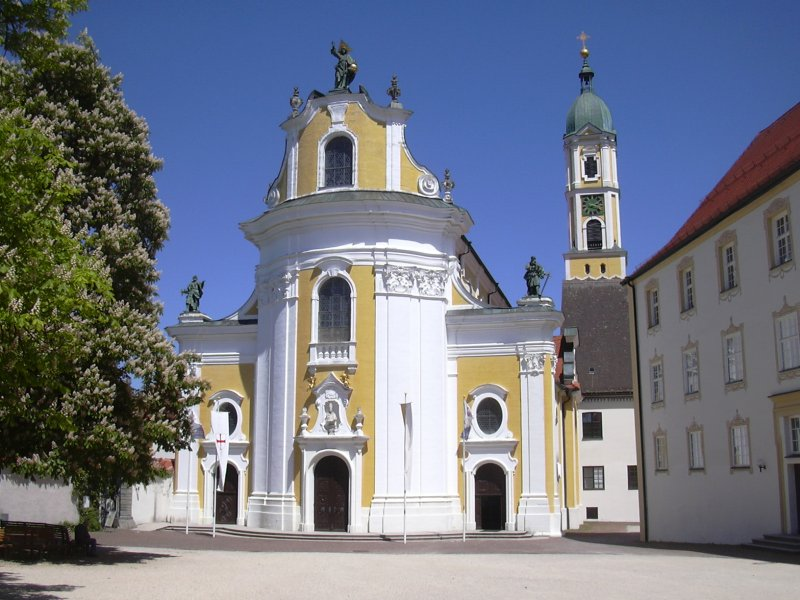
Ochsenhausen, monastery

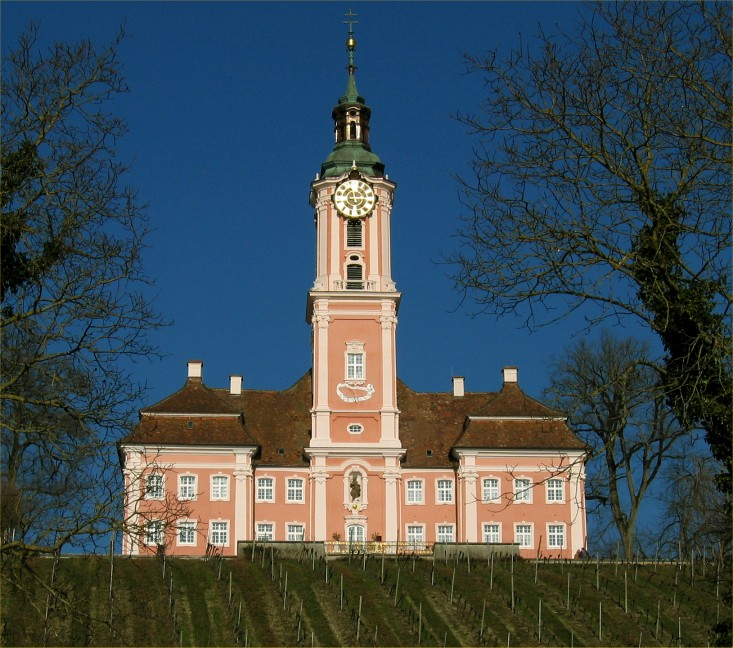
Birnau, pilgrimage church

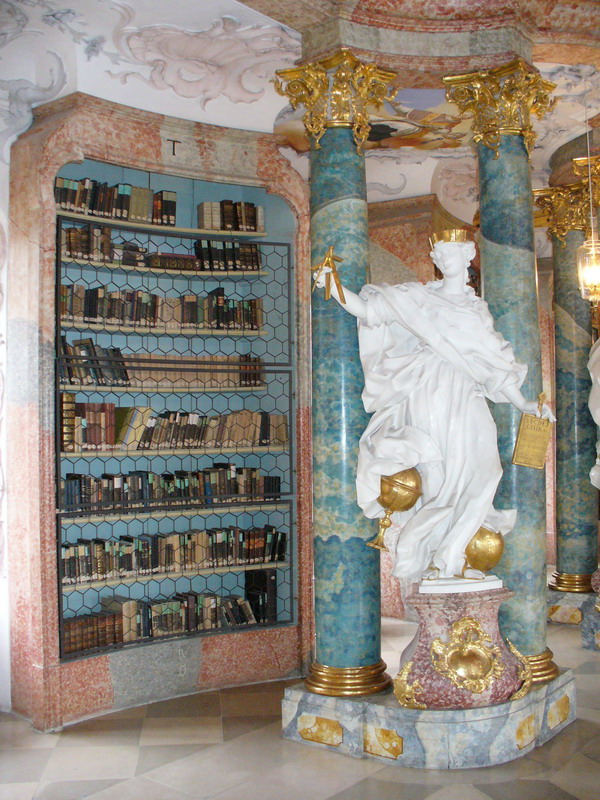
Wiblingen, monastery, library

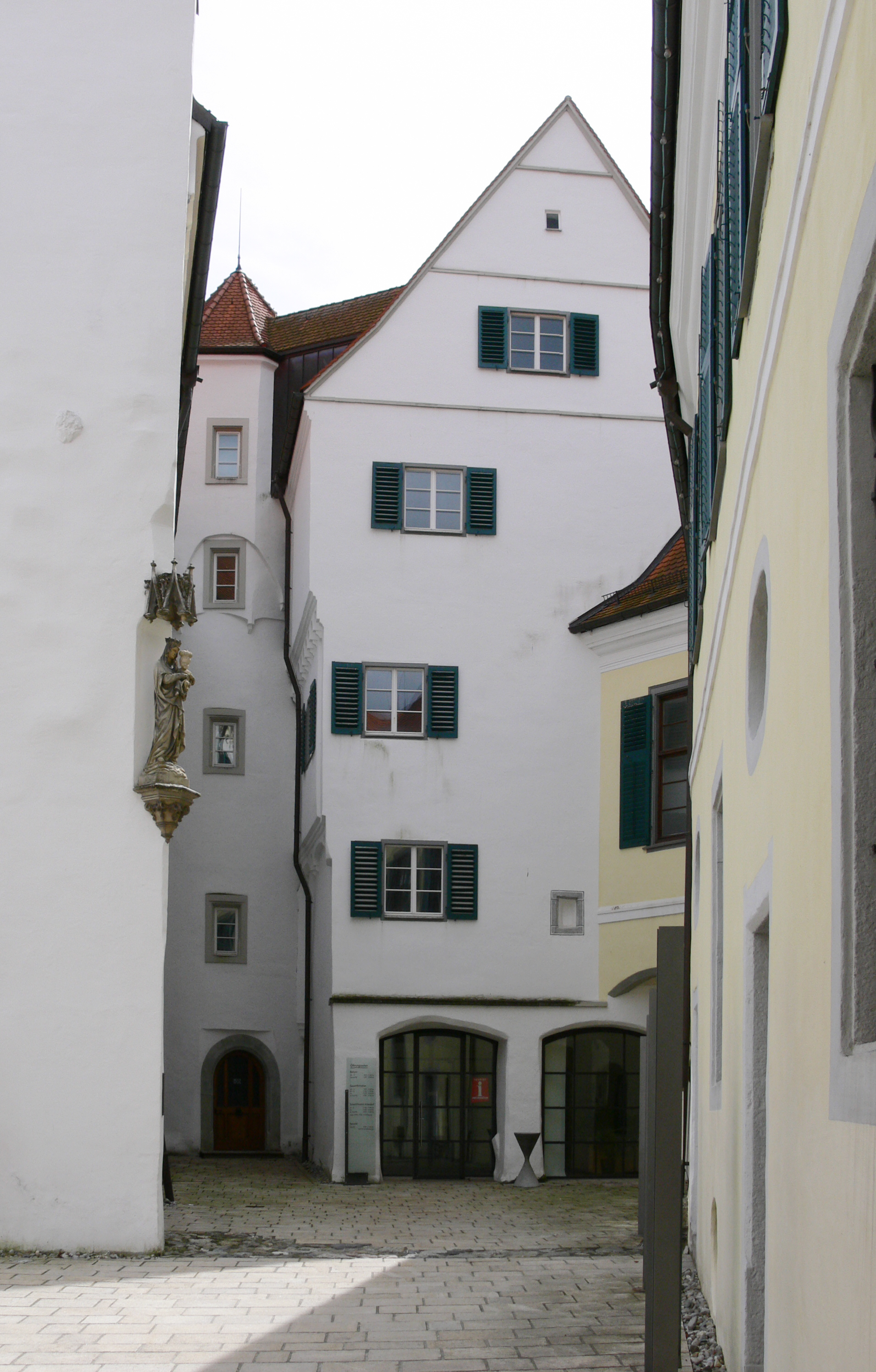
Aulendorf, castle yard

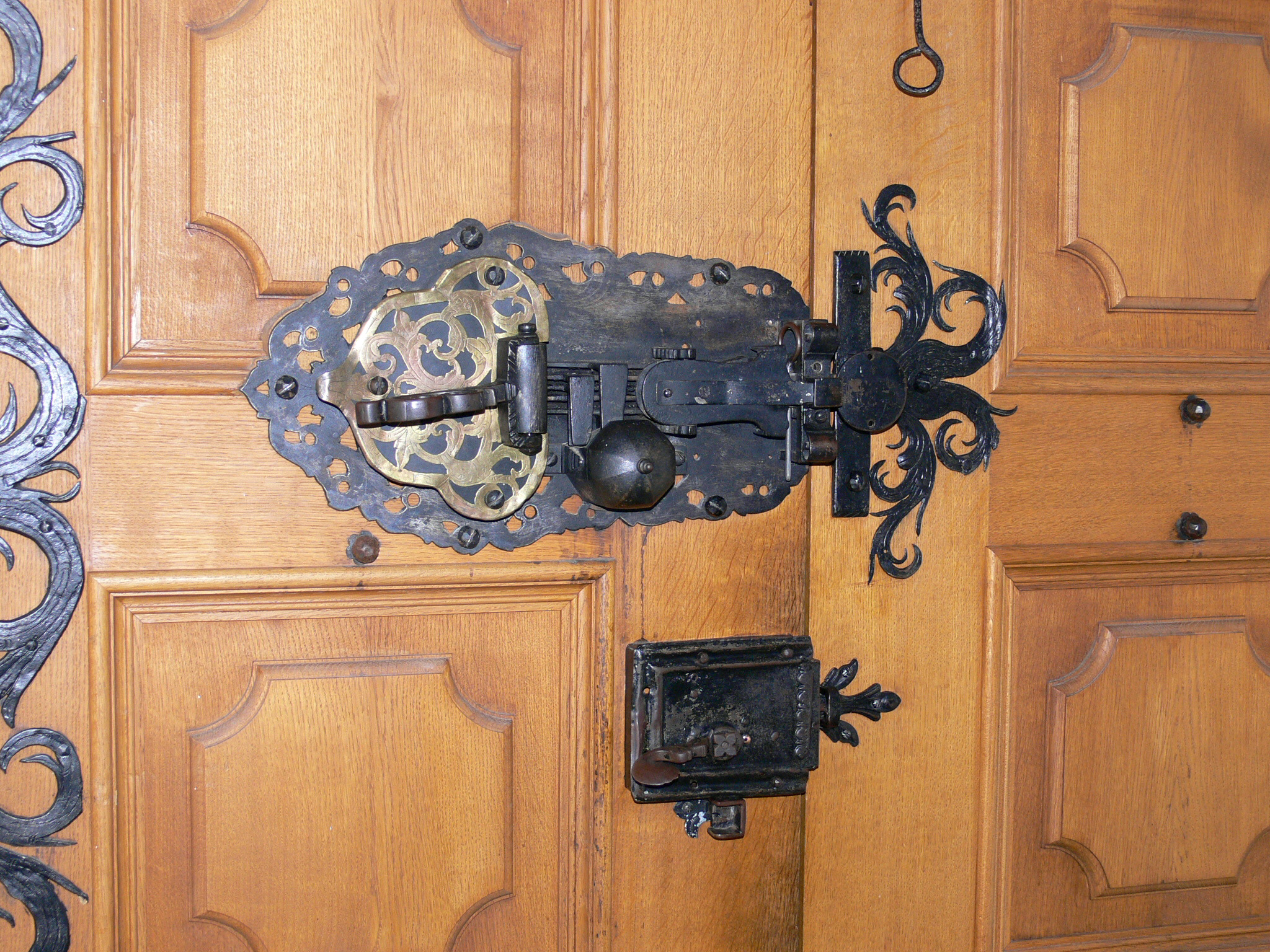
Sießen, lock on main door of monastery church

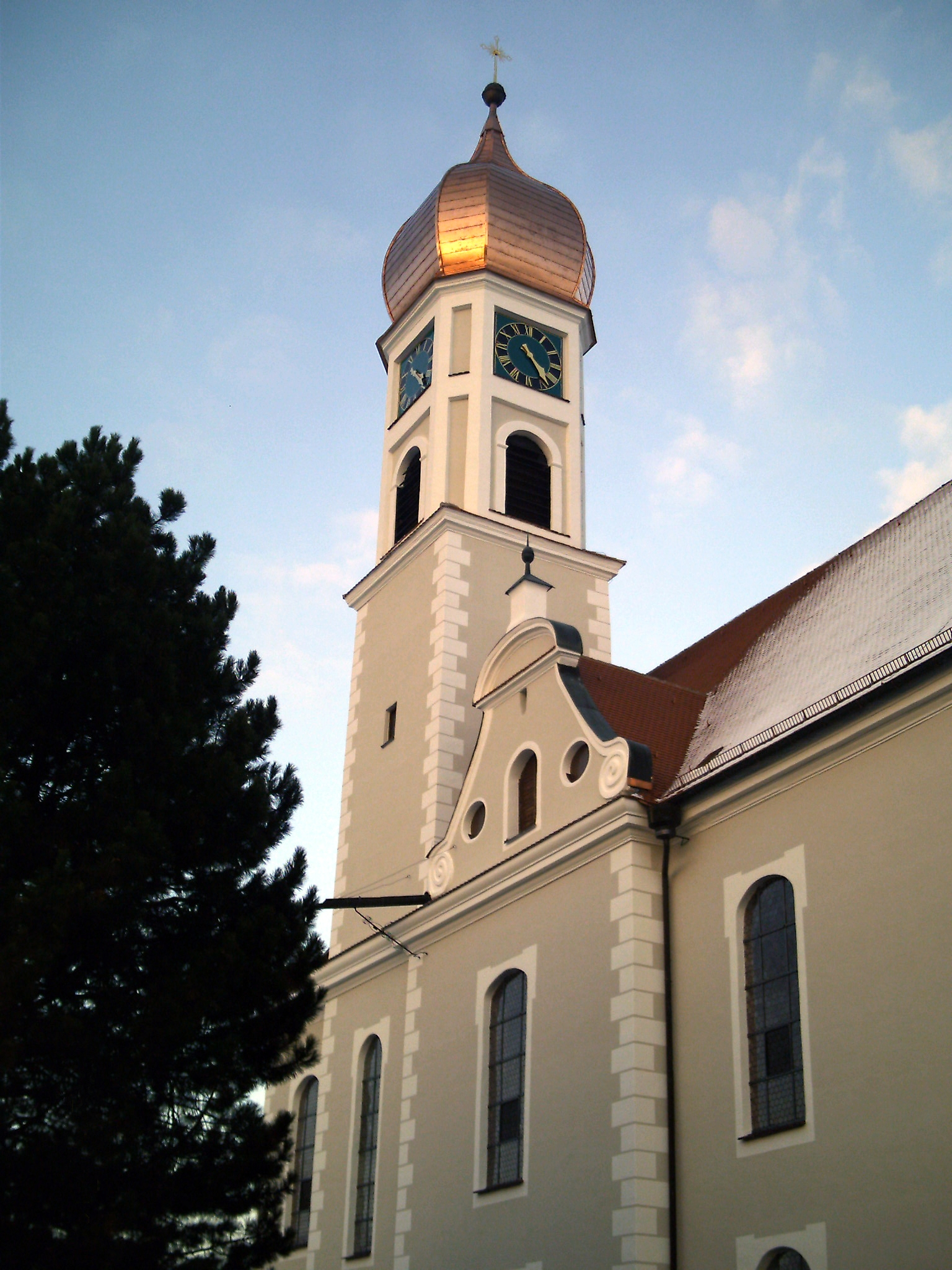
Tannheim, parish church

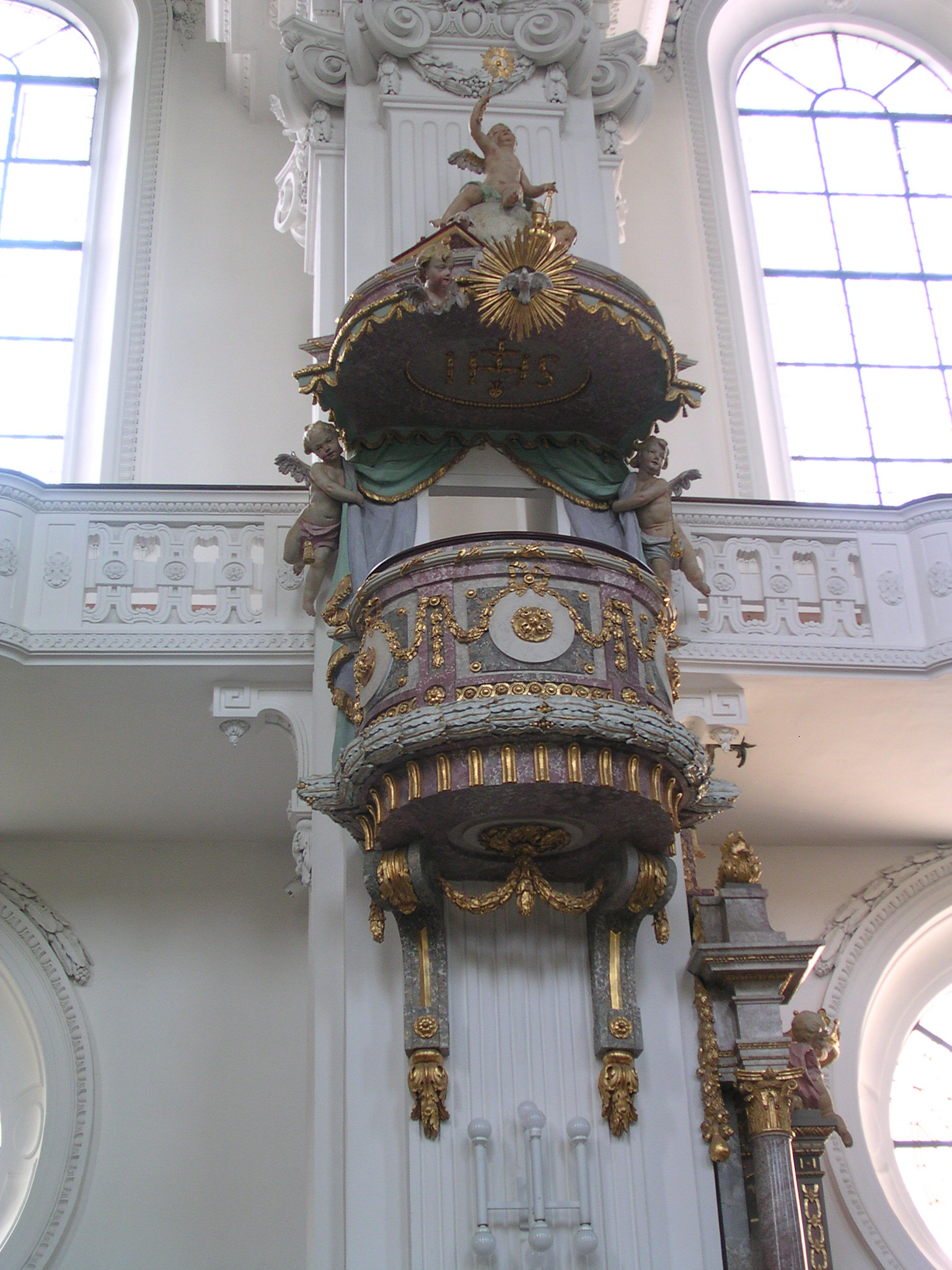
Rot an der Rot, parish church, chancel

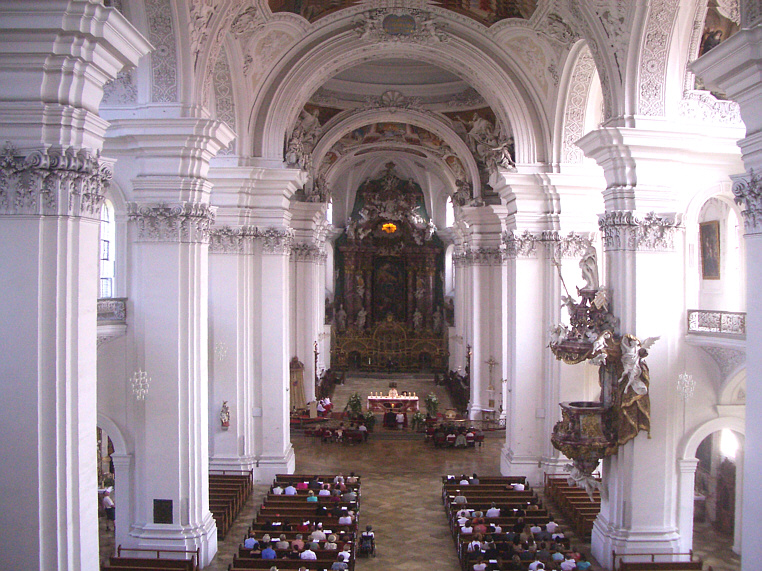
Basilica Weingarten, nave

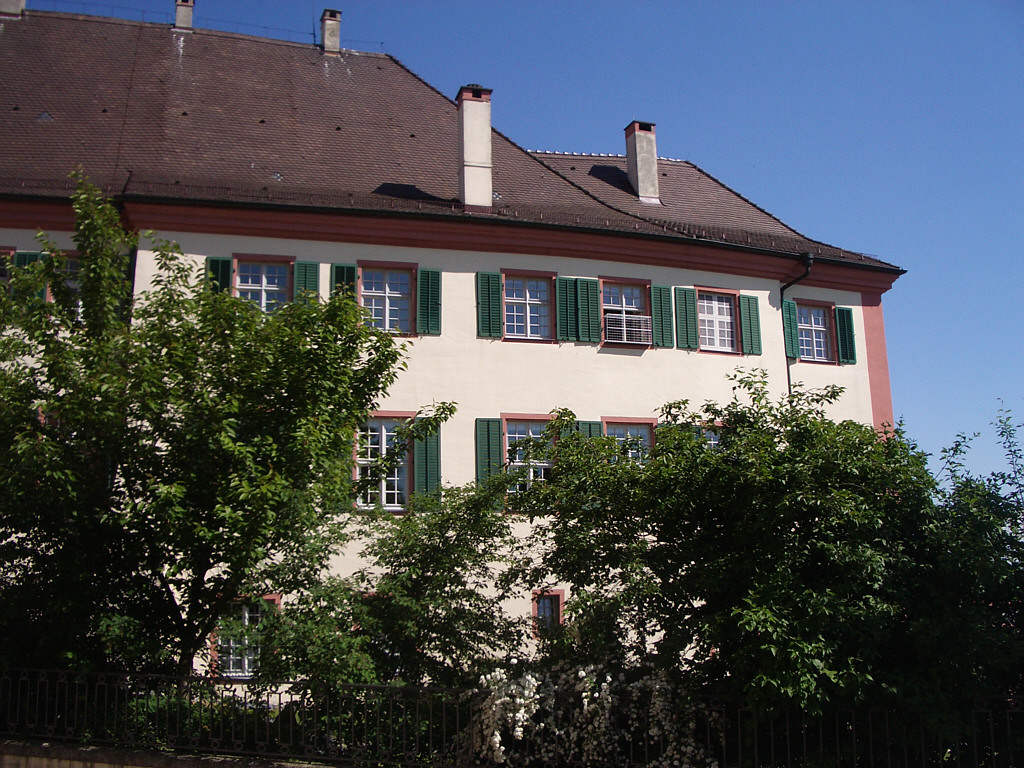
Altshausen, New Castle

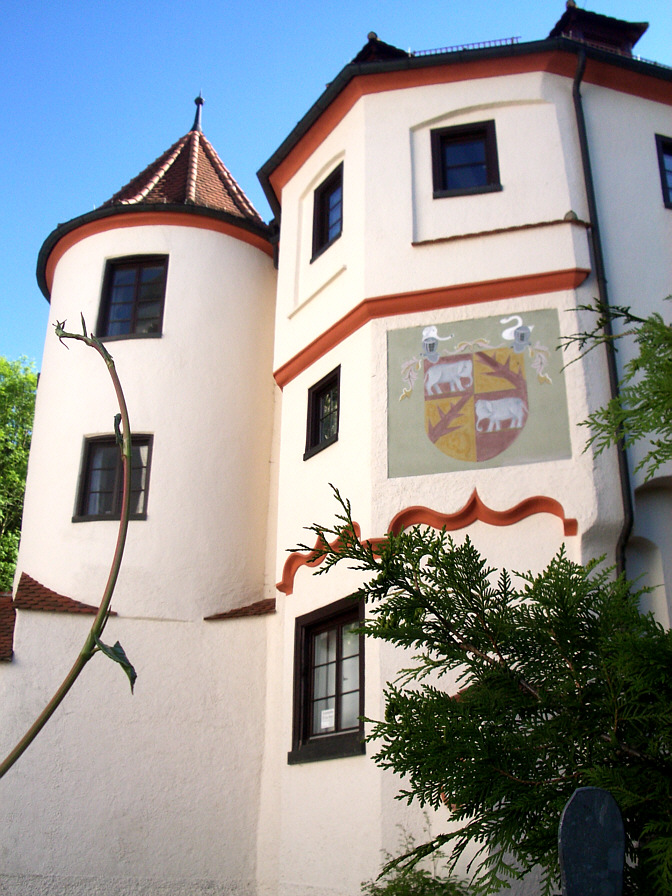
Castle Neufra

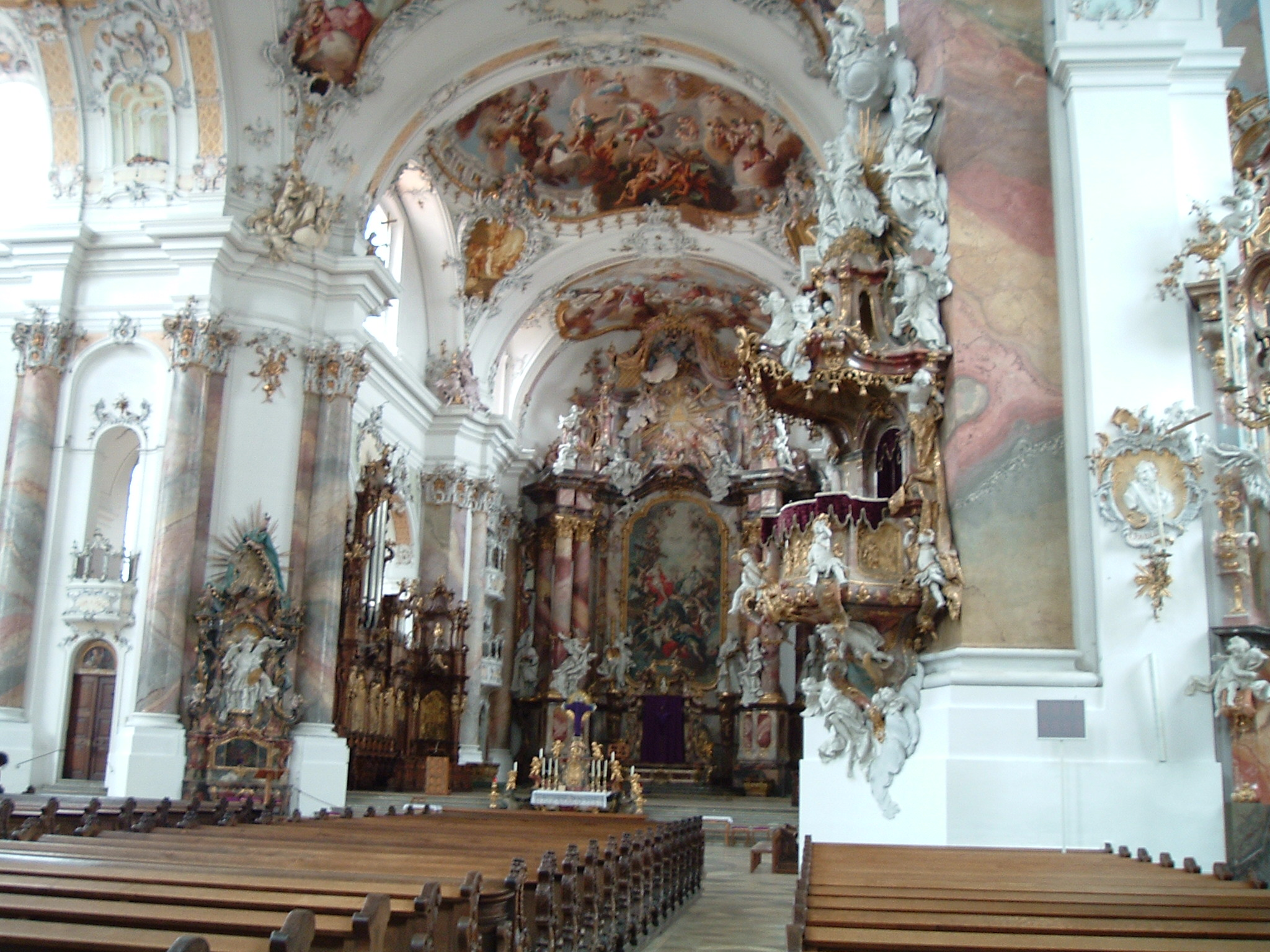
Ottobeuren, Basilica, interior

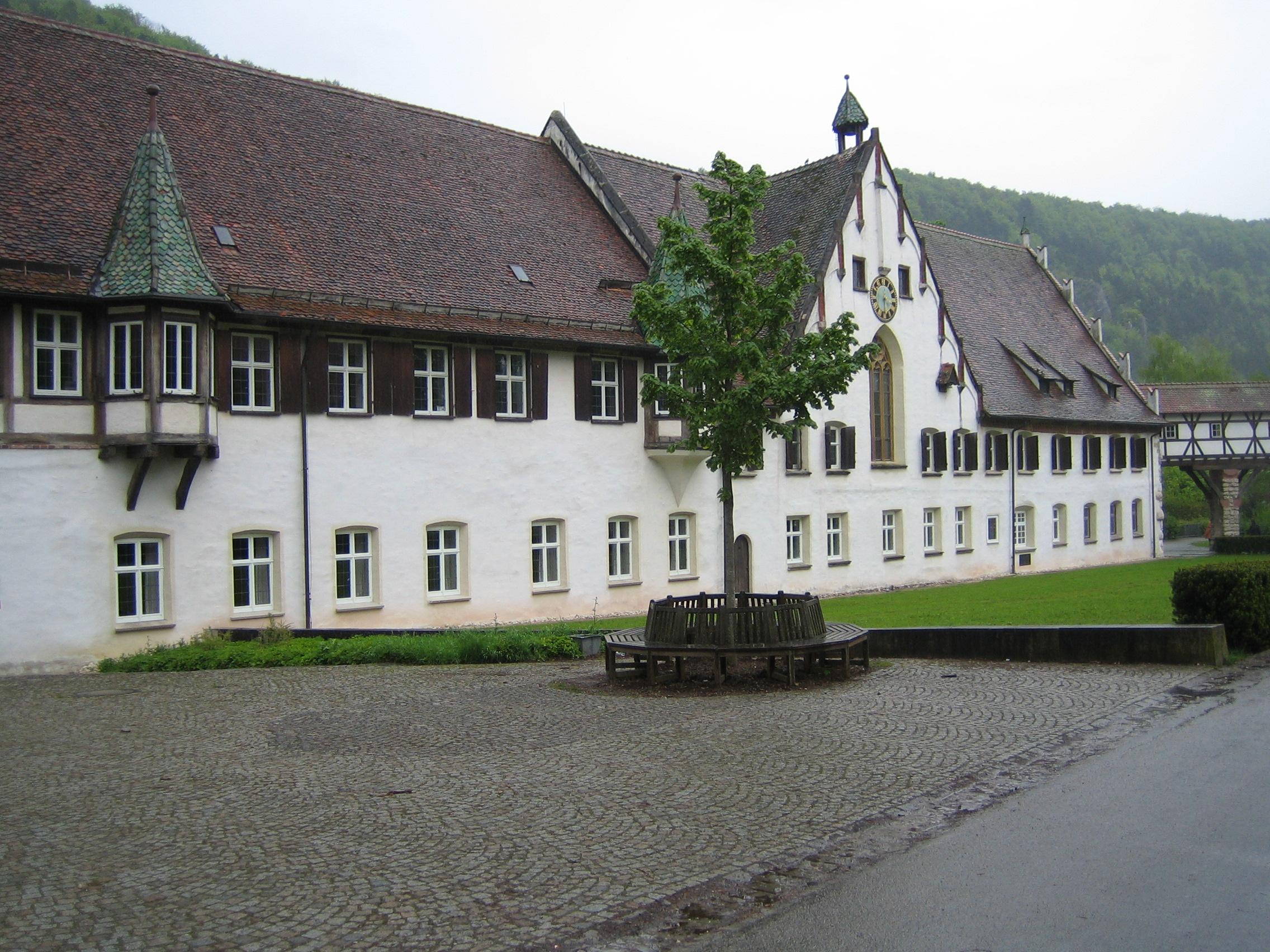
Blaubeuren, monastery

== Routes ==
There are four routes of the Upper Swabian Baroque Route: the main route, the west route, the south route and the east route.

=== Main route ===
The main route is circular, starting and terminating at Ulm. It passes the following villages and cities:

- Ulm, Wiblingen, Donaustetten, Gögglingen, Unterweiler, Blaubeuren, Erbach (Donau), Donaurieden, Ersingen, Oberdischingen, Öpfingen, Gamerschwang, Nasgenstadt, Ehingen (Donau), Munderkingen, Obermarchtal, Mochental, Zell, Zwiefalten, Dürrenwaldstetten, Daugendorf, Unlingen, Riedlingen, Heudorf, Kappel, Bad Buchau, Reichenbach, Muttensweiler, Steinhausen, Bad Schussenried, Otterswang, Aulendorf, Altshausen, Ebenweiler, Reute bei Bad Waldsee, Bad Waldsee, Baindt, Weingarten, Ravensburg, Obereschach, Gornhofen, Weißenau, Markdorf, Friedrichshafen, Eriskirch, Langenargen, Tettnang, Tannau, Wangen im Allgäu, Deuchelried, Argenbühl, Isny im Allgäu, Kißlegg im Allgäu, Wolfegg, Bergatreute, Bad Wurzach, Rot an der Rot, Ochsenhausen, Ummendorf, Biberach an der Riß, Reinstetten, Gutenzell, Schwendi, Burgrieden, Villa Rot, Laupheim, Baltringen, Maselheim, Bihlafingen, Oberkirchberg, Unterkirchberg, Ulm.

=== West route ===
The West route starts at Riedlingen and terminates at Meersburg on Lake Constance. It passes the following villages and cities:

Riedlingen, Altheim, Heiligkreuztal, Ertingen, Herbertingen, Bad Saulgau, Sießen, Ostrach, Habsthal, Krauchenwies, Sigmaringen, Meßkirch, Kloster Wald, Pfullendorf, Heiligenberg-Betenbrunn, Weildorf, Salem Abbey, Überlingen, Birnau, Seefelden, Baitenhausen, Meersburg.

=== South route ===
The south route leads around Lake Constance. It starts at Kressbronn am Bodensee, passing through Austria and Switzerland before terminating at Meersburg. It passes the following villages and cities:

Kressbronn am Bodensee, Schleinsee, Wasserburg, Lindau, Bregenz, Bildstein, Dornbirn, Hohenems, Altstätten, Trogen, St. Gallen, Arbon, Romanshorn, Münsterlingen, Kreuzlingen, Konstanz, Mainau, Meersburg.

=== East route ===
The east route is the shortest route, starting at Rot an der Rot and terminating at Kißlegg, thereby partly extending into the Allgäu. It passes the following villages and cities:

Rot an der Rot, Berkheim, Bonlanden, Binnrot, Haslach, Tannheim, Buxheim (Swabia), Memmingen, Ottobeuren, Legau, Bad Grönenbach, Kronburg, Maria Steinbach, Legau, Frauenzell, Leutkirch im Allgäu, Rötsee, Kißlegg.

== Artists and architects of Upper Swabian Baroque ==
- Cosmas Damian Asam, architect and painter
- Egid Quirin Asam, sculptor and plasterer
- Andreas Meinrad von Au, painter
- Johann Caspar Bagnato, architect
- Franz Anton Bagnato, architect
- Franz Beer, architect
- Johann Joseph Christian, sculptor and plasterer
- Jakob Emele, architect
- Joseph Anton Feuchtmayer, sculptor and plasterer
- Johann Michael Feuchtmayer, plasterer
- Johann Georg Fischer, architect
- Johann Michael Fischer, architect
- Joseph Gabler, organ builder
- Johann Nepomuk Holzhey, pipe organ builder
- Franz Martin Kuen, Painter
- Sebastian Sailer, monk and dialect poet
- Franz Xaver Schmuzer, plasterer
- Johann Schmuzer, plasterer
- Johann Georg Specht, architect
- Franz Joseph Spiegler, painter
- Jacob Carl Stauder, painter
- Peter Thumb, architect
- Januarius Zick, painter
- Johannes Zick, painter of frescoes
- Dominikus Zimmermann, architect and plasterer
- Johann Baptist Zimmermann, painter and plasterer
