= Bad Schussenried =

- Town
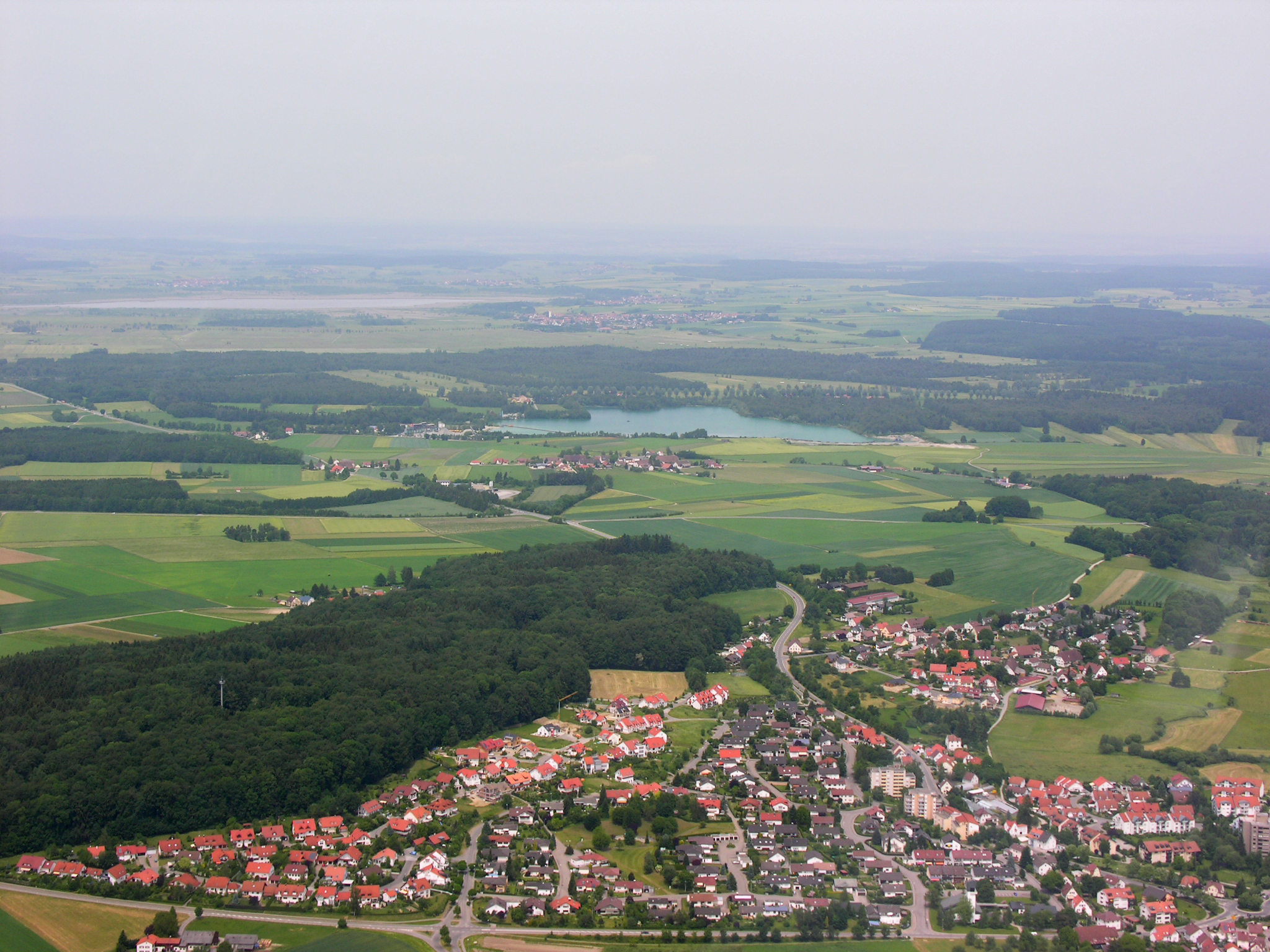

- Coat of arms

- Location of Bad Schussenried within Biberach district
- Interactive map of Bad Schussenried
- Location within Germany Location within Baden-Württemberg
- Coordinates: 48°0′24″N 9°39′31″E
- Country: Germany
- State: Baden-Württemberg
- Admin. region: Tübingen
- District: Biberach

Government
  - Mayor (2018–26): Achim Deinet

Area
  - Total: 55.01 km^{2} (21.24 sq mi)
- Elevation: 570 m (1,870 ft)

Population (2025-12-31)
  - Total: 9,012
  - Density: 163.8/km^{2} (424.3/sq mi)
- Time zone: UTC+01:00 (CET)
  - Summer (DST): UTC+02:00 (CEST)
- Postal codes: 88427
- Dialling codes: 07583
- Vehicle registration: BC
- Website: www.bad-schussenried.de

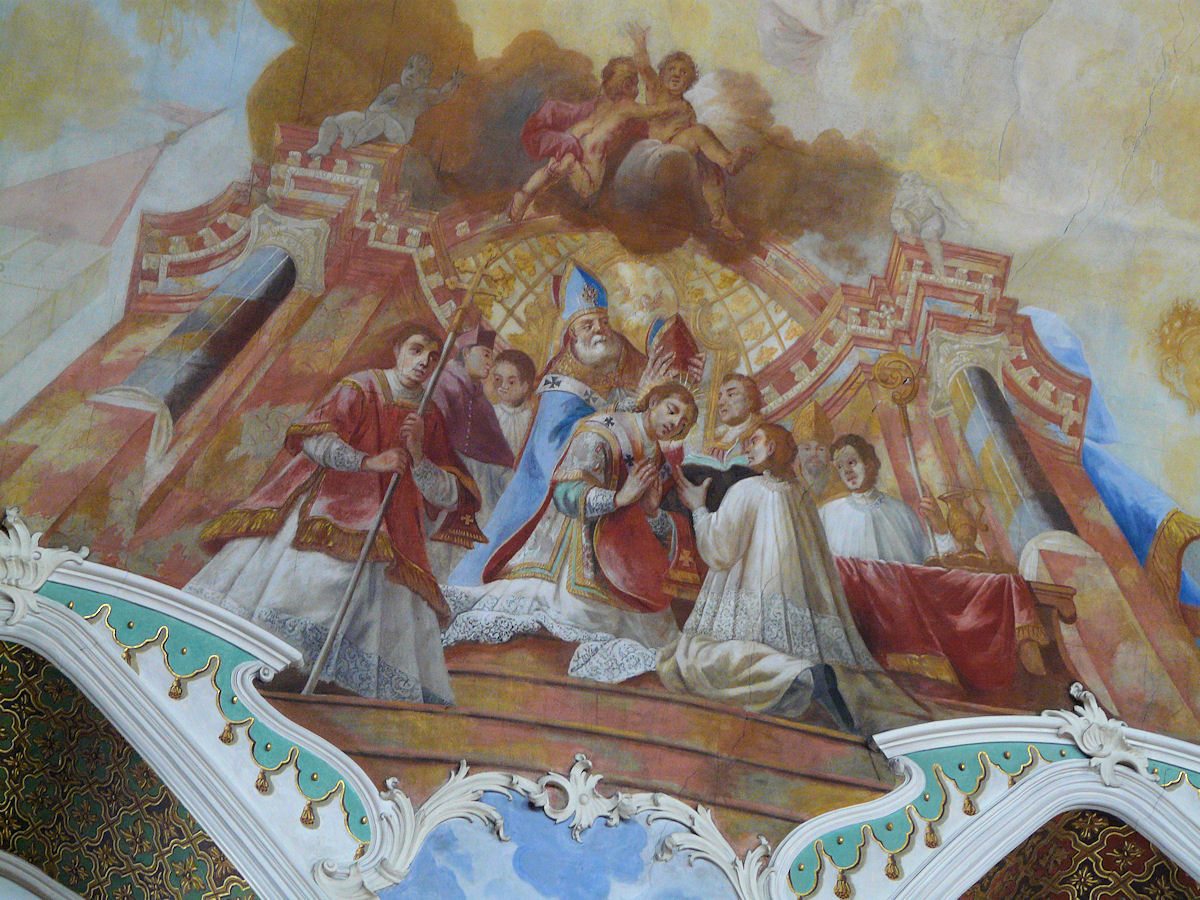
Fresco by Johannes Zick in the Church of St. Magnus.

Bad Schussenried (German pronunciation: [ˌbaːt ˈʃʊsn̩ʁiːt]; Swabian: Schussariad) is a spa town in Upper Swabia in the district of Biberach, Baden-Württemberg, Germany.

It lies on the Upper Swabian Baroque Route and the Swabian Spa Route. Schussenried Abbey, a former monastery founded in 1183, is located in Bad Schussenried. Its church and Baroque library feature impressive architecture and artwork, including intricate ceiling frescoes.

The town is also home to a beer stein museum, the Schussenrieder Bierkrug Museum.

Bad Schussenried had a population of 8,537 at the end of 2015.

== Geography ==
Bad Schussenried is located between Ulm and Lake Constance on the river Schussen. The 48th parallel north runs through Bad Schussenried.

== History ==
Archaeological finds provided evidence of a prehistoric settlement in the region. In 1866, a Paleolithic campsite of hunters and gatherers was discovered. These were the first Paleolithic finds in Central Europe.

=== World Heritage Site ===
At Aichbühl, about 1.5 km north of the Schussen source, excavations at the end of the 19th century in the bog of Federsee discovered Neolithic pile-dwelling (or stilt house) settlements that are part of the Prehistoric Pile dwellings around the Alps UNESCO World Heritage Site.

=== Middle Ages ===
Shuozenried was first mentioned in records in 1153. The history of the city is closely linked to that of Schussenried Abbey. In 1183, the local lords Konrad and Beringer founded the Premonstratensian monastery. The abbey received many privileges, for example in 1521 the High Jurisdiction (blood court), allowing it to depict the sword next to the crozier in the coat of arms. Until the secularization, the canons governed the monastic community.

== Culture and attractions ==
=== Museums ===
- Bierkrugmuseum is a museum about beer steins
- Oberschwäbisches Museumsdorf Kürnbach is an Upper Swabian village with 31 buildings and furnishings from six centuries
- Pilgrimage museum Alte Schmiede at Steinhausen
- Ailinger Erlebnismühle with an over 400 years old tradition in the district Reichenbach
- Museum of coaches
- Zentrales württembergisches Mundartarchiv und Museum
- Monastery museum Klostermuseum Bad Schussenried

=== Buildings ===
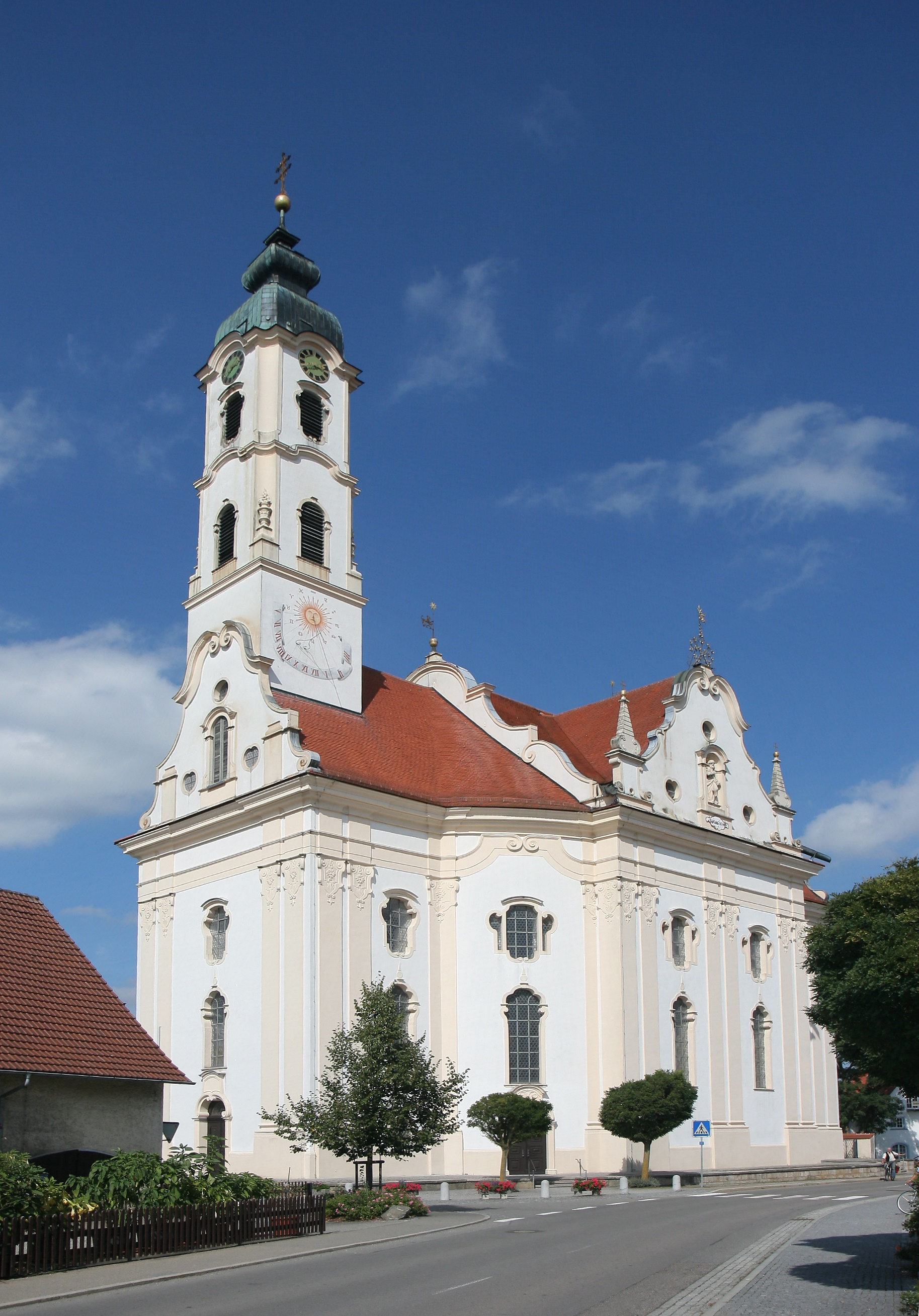
Pilgrimage Church St. Peter and Paul in Steinhausen.

- Schussenried Abbey
- Sanctuary Church of Our Lady, Steinhausen, 1728–1731
- Church St. Oswald at district Otterswang, 1770
- Church Kirche zu den Heiligen Sebastian at district Reichenbach, 1460
- Castles: Burg Hervetsweiler, Burg Kürnbach, Ruine Otterswang, Burg Reichenbach, Burg Rudersberg, Burg Schussenried

== Economy and Infrastructure ==
Until the middle of the 20th century, peat extraction was an important industry in Schussenried. Today major local employers are a psychiatric hospital for general psychiatry and psychotherapy (ZfP Südwürttemberg), the Schwäbische Hüttenwerke (SHW), an automotive supplier, and the concrete mixer division of the Liebherr Group.

=== Transport ===
The station Bad Schussenried is located on the Southern Railway (Württemberg). Trains run every hour to Ulm and Friedrichshafen.

=== Education ===
Bad Schussenried has a primary school, a Werkrealschule, a Realschule and a Progymnasium. In addition, the Humboldt-Institut for German as a foreign language runs a boarding school for international students.

== Personality ==
Oswald Metzger, a former Green party, now Christian democratic politician and cyclist Rolf Gölz, who won a silver medal in the 1984 Summer Olympics, are from Bad Schussenried. The world champion women trick cyclists are also from Bad Schussenried.

=== Sons and daughters of the town ===
- Johann Baptist Allgaier (1763–1823), chess player
- Rolf Gölz (born 1962), professional cyclist and, sporting director of racing team Gerolsteiner

=== Personalities who have worked locally ===
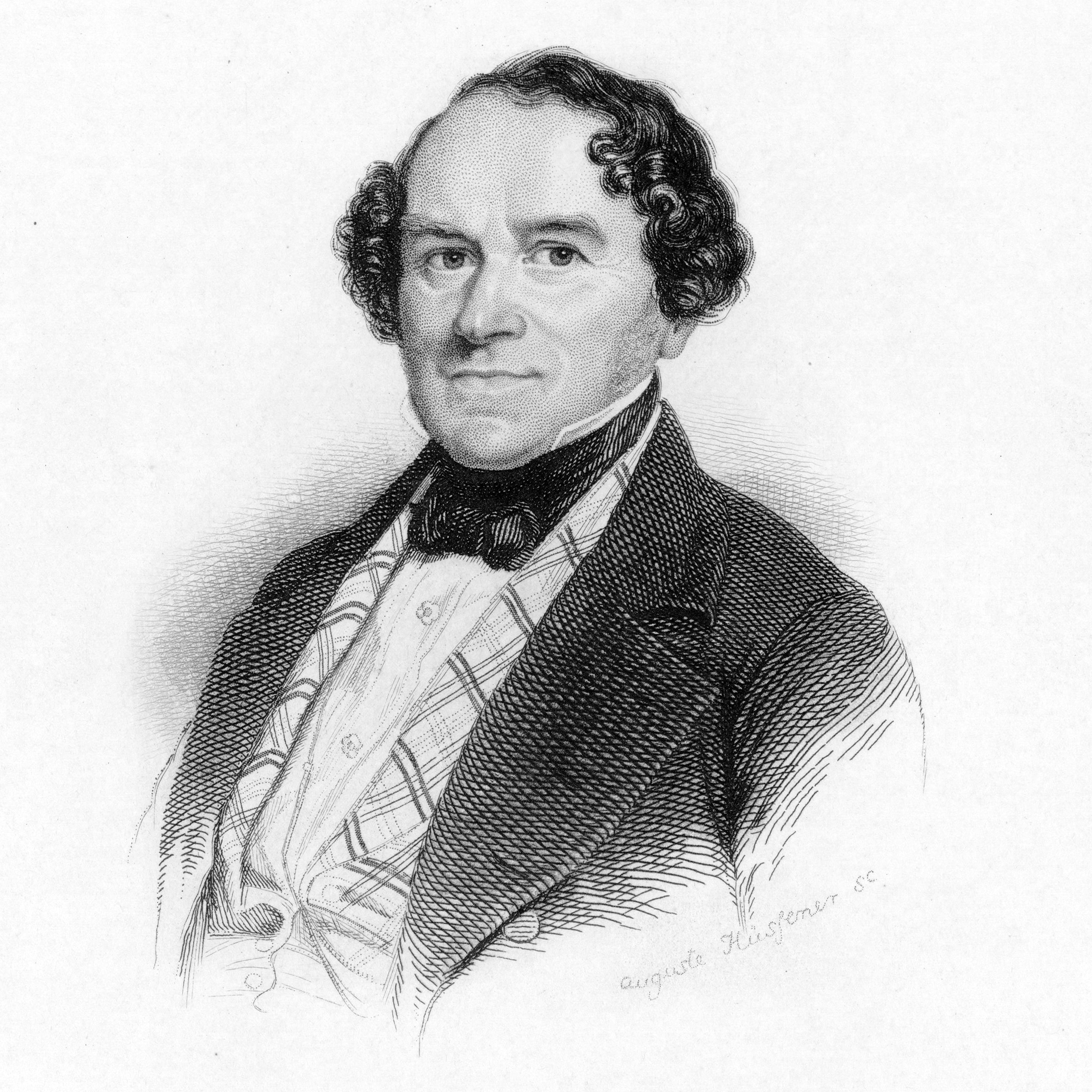
Conradin Kreutzer

- Conradin Kreutzer (1780–1849), composer and band leader, visited the monastery school in Schussenried
