= Schussenried Abbey =

German abbey

- Kloster Schussenried
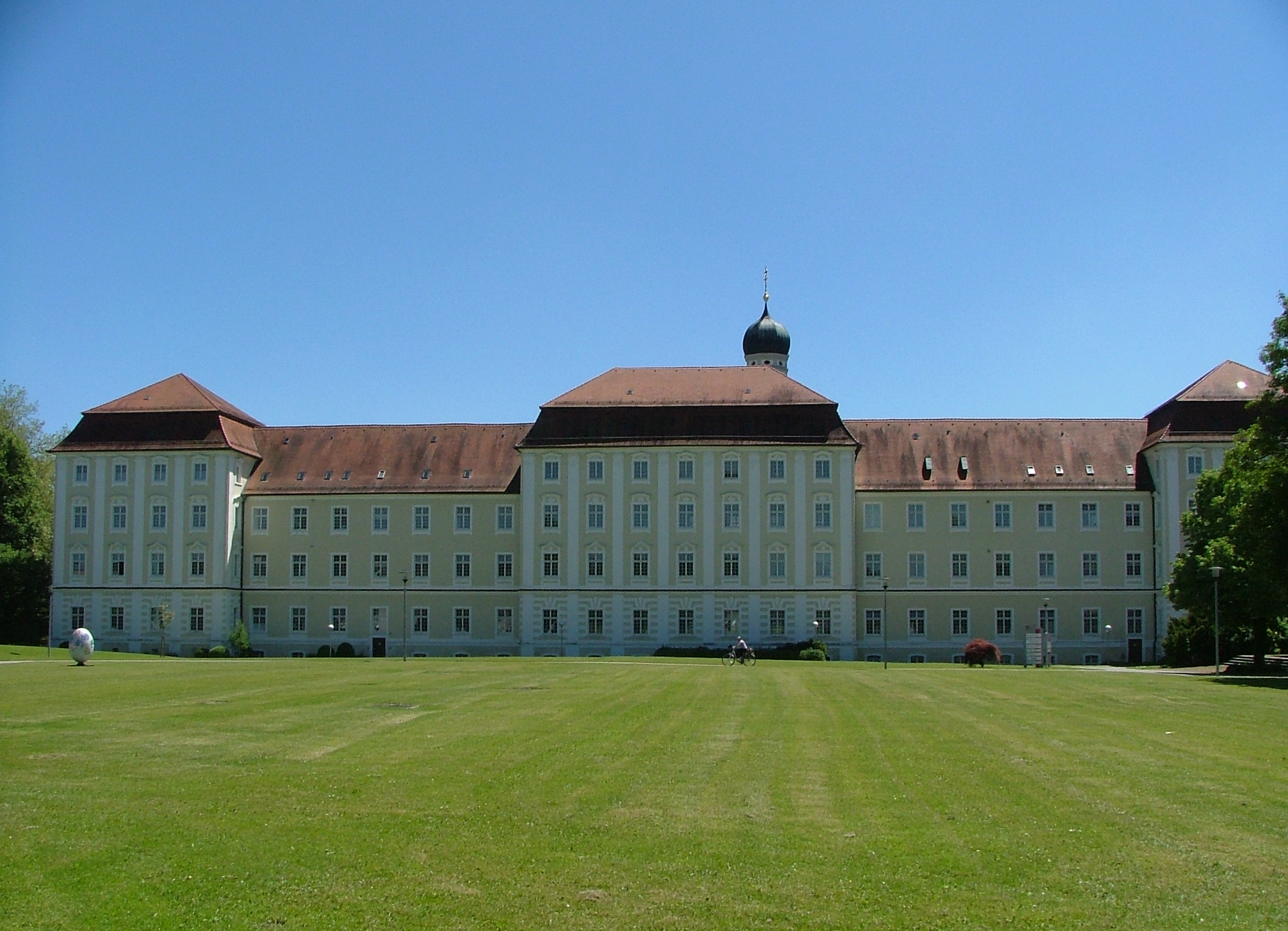
- New Monastery (Neues Kloster) from the north

- Location within Baden-Württemberg Location within Germany

General information
- Location: Bad Schussenried, Germany
- Coordinates: 48°00′26″N 9°39′31″E

Website
- www.kloster-schussenried.de

Schussenried Abbey (Kloster Schussenried, Reichsabtei Schussenried) is a former Catholic monastery in Bad Schussenried, Baden-Württemberg, Germany. It is famed for its Baroque library hall. The abbey was established in the 12th century by the Premonstratensian Order and made an Imperial Abbey in the 15th century. The monastery sustained immense damage in the Thirty Years' War. In the 18th century, the abbey began expansions in the Baroque style, but was unable to complete them. The abbey was secularized in 1803 and twice awarded during the process of German Mediatization, eventually becoming a possession of the Kingdom of Württemberg. Its second king, William I, opened a foundry on its grounds, which was followed by a nursing home. These ceased operation or moved out of the monastery in the 1990s.

== History ==
In 1183, two brothers, Berengar and Konrad von Schussenried, unmarried members of the House of Hohenstaufen, donated their holdings – a castle, two nearby mills, a parish church, and even their family coat of arms – to the Premonstratensian Order. The brothers also joined the Order, and were themselves joined in the latter half of the year by 12 canons and a provost sent from Weissenau Abbey to establish a new monastery. Construction began around 1185, and was complete enough by 1188 to allow the burials of Berengar and the provost in the nave of the abbey church. Konrad was also laid to rest in the church three years later.

A dispute began at this time with the Barons of Wartenberg that resulted in Schussenried's monks fleeing to Weissenau Abbey, where they sought the legal aid of Pope Celestine III. With the help of the Bishop of Constance, an agreement was reached in 1205 that allowed Schussenried's monks to return to their monastery. Further security for the abbey was achieved when Pope Innocent III granted Schussenried his protection on 13 February 1211 and when it was made an imperial abbey and given control of customs in its territories by Emperor Frederick II, in 1227. The general chapter of the Premonstratensian Order itself officially raised Schussenried to the status of abbey in 1440. In 1240, Schussenried was freed from having to recognize a vogt, though it still received, in 1452, the protection of the knight Georg, Truchsess von Waldburg. This was replaced by the 15th century with that of the Holy Roman Emperor himself. Schussenried was freed from the legal jurisdiction of other states as early as 1487, and its abbot was allowed to attend Reichstags by 1497. Legal freedom was followed in 1512 with jurisdiction over high courts in its territories, which was expanded to blood courts in 1521. All cases in Schussenried's territory thereafter would be tried by a local judiciary, for whom a courthouse was built on the abbey's grounds in 1513. Schussenried joined the Swabian College of Imperial abbeys in 1538.

With the abbey's existence secure by the 1220s, Schussenried's monks sought to make it economically independent as well. From 1224 to 1253, Schussenried Abbey purchased estates in the nearby villages of Hopferbach, Kürnbach, Laimbach, Schwaigfurt, Olzreute, Kleinwinnaden, Roppertsweiler, Sattenbeuren, and Eggatsweiler. Further expansion took place over the 14th and 15th centuries via the acquisition of patronage rights in and eventual annexation of Winterstettendorf, Reichenbach, Eggmannsried, Steinhausen-Muttensweiler, Oggelshausen, Stafflangen, Allmannsweiler, Otterswang, Attenweiler, and Eberhardzell. Until the 15th century, the brothers of the abbey were minor noblemen from these towns and after that period were mostly local gentry. As monks at Schussenried, they would also administer to the local parishes, part of the Premonstratensian district of Swabia. Several abbots were from those towns as well, but the majority came from larger Swabian towns. The number of novices at Schussenried at any given time was between 15 and 20, peaking at 45 in the 18th century. These men were educated at Schussenried and other Premonstratensian monasteries, though most of them after 1550 were taught by the Jesuits at the Study Church of the Assumption in Dillingen an der Donau, and some acquired degrees from the universities of Tübingen, Freiburg, Heidelberg, and Rome.

There was little construction at Schussenried during the 16th century, but it survived the Protestant Reformation and German Peasants' War. Abbot Matthäus Rohrer, in office from 1621 to 1653, reconstructed the eastern portion of the monastery until the outbreak of an illness in 1628 amongst the monks later attributed to poisoned wine. During the Swedish phase of the Thirty Years' War, Schussenried was forced to quarter Swedish troops. When those troops, under the command of Carl Gustaf Wrangel, withdrew in 1647, they set fire to the monastery. The only portions of the complex that survived were the library, the monastery's entrance hall, and the nave of the church. With profits from emergency sales, the monks installed a new roof over the church in 1649–50. Reconstruction of the abbey was completed in 1660 under Abbot Augustinus Arzet.

=== New Monastery ===
In 1700, Abbot Tiberius Mangold commissioned the Austrian architect Christian Thumb to create a plan for a new abbey church. Thumb's plans were extensive, including four courtyards, and the existing Church of St. Magnus was to be renovated. Further work was made impossible by the War of the Spanish Succession, which began in 1701 and cost the monastery 297,000 gulden between the quartering of soldiers and monetary seizures. It wasn't until 1714 that Abbot Tiberius was able to continue his renovations, placing an order for new choir stalls from the master Swabian woodcarver Georg Anton Machein. The delivery of the stalls in 1717 began a remodeling of the abbey church in the Baroque style that would last until 1748.

On 20 March 1748, famed Baroque architect Dominikus Zimmermann submitted a plan for the New Monastery. With that plan came a scale model with an area of 110 centimeters (43 in) by 88 centimeters (35 in) and removable floors and roofs. His workshop made another model in 1760 of the outer area and its two complexes of workshops. Zimmerman and his brother Johann Baptist had already worked for Schussenried Abbey at Steinhausen pilgrimage church from 1727 to 1733. Zimmermman's plans were accepted, but a local, Jakob Emele, was charged with their execution in 1749. Only about a third of Zimmerman's designs were made reality before the monastery ran out of funds in 1763, and the abbot dismissed.

The 16th century courthouse was replaced with a prison built in 1758.

=== Secularization ===
In 1803, Napoleon Bonaparte annexed the Left Bank of the Rhine, and compensated disadvantaged German princes with the territories of smaller states in the former Holy Roman Empire. Among the former were the Counts of Sternberg-Manderscheid, who received the Imperial Abbeys of Schussenried and Ochsenhausen. Schussenried Abbey was awarded to the county on 25 February 1803, and it became a residence for the Counts of Sternberg-Manderscheid. The Counts kept 18 of the 30 monks to look after its grounds, but sold much of the Abbeys' inventory and demolished its eastern portion. Three years later, Sternberg-Manderscheid was mediatized into the newly raised Kingdom of Württemberg, to whom the Counts sold the Abbey on 1 April 1835. King William I, as part of his social welfare programs, established a foundry in 1840 and a nursing home in 1875 on the abbey grounds. The nursing home became the State Psychiatric Hospital of Bad Schussenried, where Gustav Mesmer was held until 1949. The hospital moved out of the New Monastery in 1997, and the foundry ceased operations in 1998.

== Grounds and architecture ==
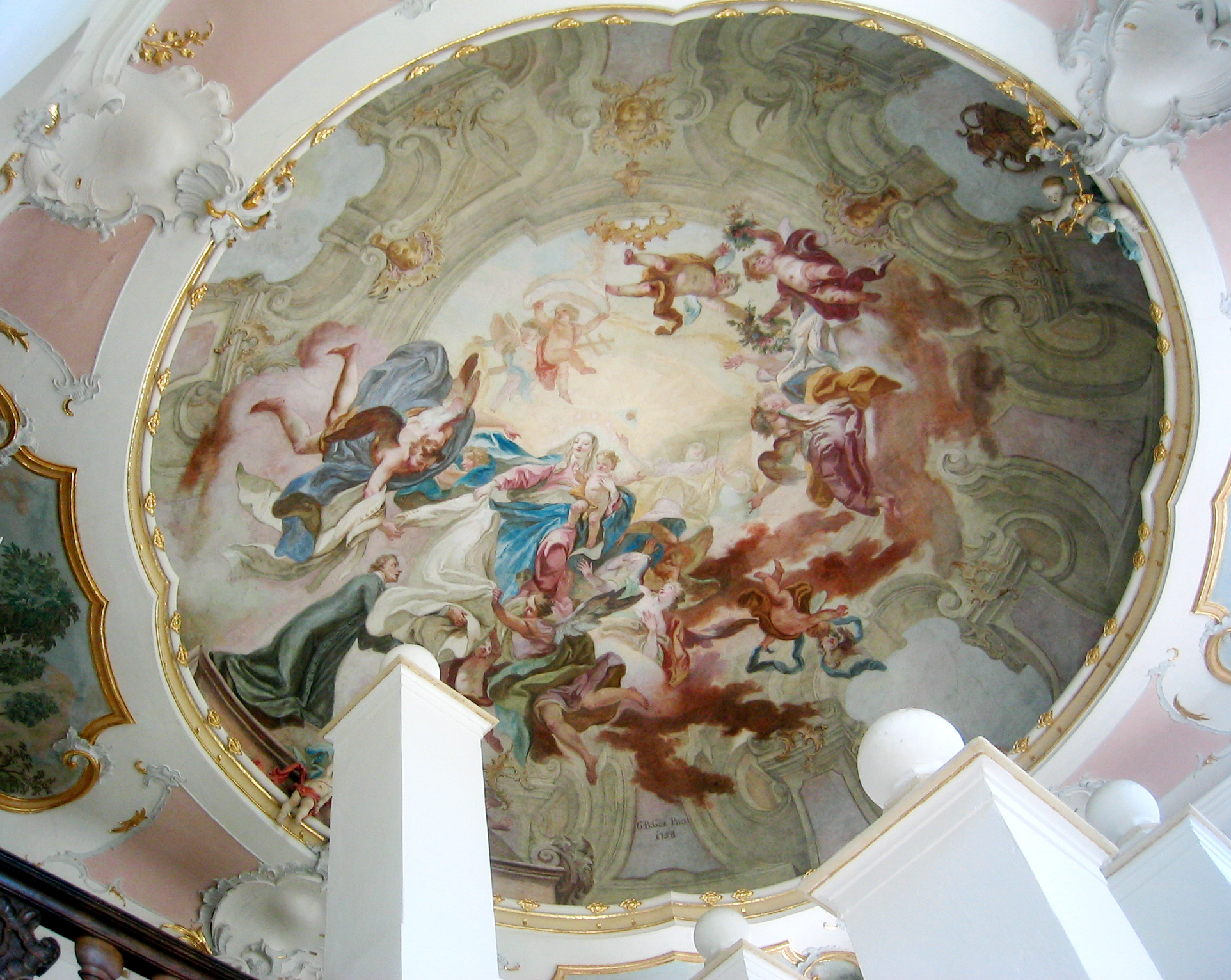
Ceiling painting in stairwell, New Monastery

Schussenried Abbey is one of the main sights of the Upper Swabian Baroque Route.

Originally, the monastery was divided into an inner area only for monks who had taken their vows, and a generally-accessible outer area. Both were enclosed by a wall and towers. Of those, only the Törle, the tower gate into the outer area, remains.

Plans were made in the 18th century to expand and remodel the monastery in the Baroque style. The abbots of Schussenried Abbey regularly visited other Swabian monasteries for ideas for those buildings.

"Old Monastery" refers to the pre-18th century structures (west and south wings, lower gate), and "New Monastery" to the Baroque buildings. Many more buildings were planned for the new monastery, but were not built because of deficient finances. One of those unbuilt buildings was to be a new church, to which the New Monastery would be centered around.

The founding relic of Schussenried Abbey is a piece of the staff of Saint Magnus of Füssen. It is housed in a reliquary designed and produced by Georg Ignaz Baur.

Premonstratensians from other Swabian monasteries who worked at Schussenried included Georg Anton Machein, who crafted choir stalls for the abbey.

=== Library Hall ===
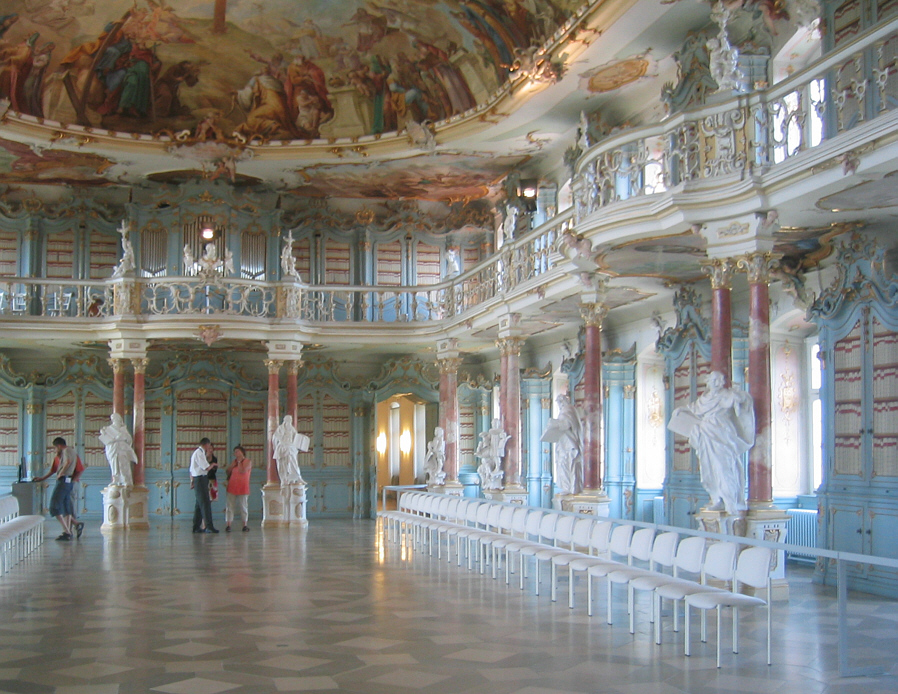
Library

The Library Hall is two stories tall, with walls lined with largely decorative bookcases, some containing fold-out desks. The ceiling fresco, painted in 1757 by Franz Georg Hermann, depicts in 14 scenes like the attempted flight of Caspar Mohr, a Premonstratensian monk and polymath. 24 alabaster sculptures fashioned in 1766 by Fidelis Sporer line the ground floor of the Library Hall. On either side of the hall, eight statues representing the Roman Catholic Church face eight statues representing Islam, Calvinism, Lutheranism, Judaism, Utraquism, Freemasons, Epicureanism, and Gnosticism.

After the secularization of the abbey, the Library Hall became a church and concert hall. An organ was installed in the hall at the end of the 19th century.

One of the rooms in the Library Hall is a gallery, the Four Elements, which depict the four elements via four scientific tools and eight techniques of the 18th century. Earth is represented by a globe, water by buckets, wheels, and pulleys, and mills, fire by the use of a mirror and sunlight to burn wood, and air by Neptune wielding a trident.

=== Abbey church ===
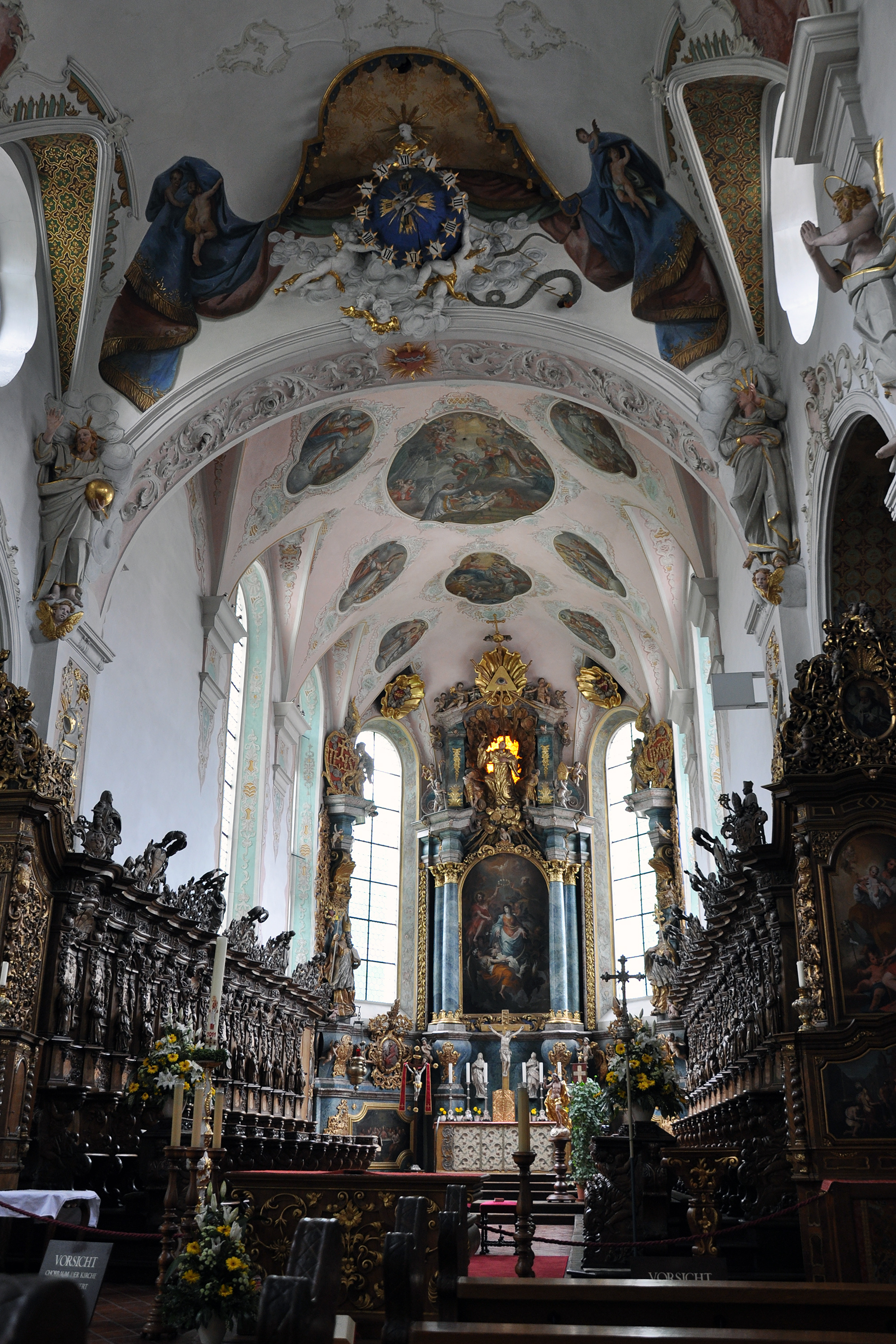
Interior of St. Magnus's Church

The abbey church of Saint Magnus is the parish church for Bad Schussenried and has been used by the local Roman Catholic parish since 1803. It was built in 1229 in the Romanesque style, with three aisles but no transept. It was dedicated to the Virgin Mary, but St. Magnus was added to the dedication in 1366. From 1493 to 1498, the church was reconstructed in the Gothic fashion. Seven chapels and winged altarpieces by Bernhard Strigel were added, as was a porch, in 1482, and new a choir with pointed arches in 1494. These arches were replaced in 1650 with a barrel vault, and the bell tower was enlarged over the 1620s and given with an onion dome in 1692. The church was once again remodeled in the 18th century in Baroque style. The original, flat ceiling was replaced with a vaulted one, round windows installed, and the preceding Romanesque and Gothic embellishments covered with stucco. This work revealed that bricks had been used in the previous renovation, making it some of the oldest brickwork in Upper Swabia.

The ceiling fresco was painted in 1745–46 by Johannes Zick and depicts the life of Saint Norbert of Xanten, founder of the Premonstratensian Order, in 14 scenes. The choir stalls are similarly decorated with images of the 24 saints revered by the Premonstratensians and the Passion of Christ. They were created from 1715 to 1717 by Georg Anton Macheln from linden, for the images, and walnut, for the seats.

=== Museum and exhibits ===
The primary museum, the Klostermuseum, is divided into three parts. The first section documents the worldly role played by Schussenried Abbey during its monastic operation. Part of this exhibit are the models of the planned New Monastery constructed by architects Zimmerman and Emele. The second focuses on three aspects of monastic life – pilgrimage, Mariology, and popular piety, all demonstrated with the abbey's sponsoring of a nearby pilgrimage church. Finally, the third section documents the role of education and the sciences at Schussenried and other Swabian monasteries in the 18th century.

== See also ==
- Alpirsbach Abbey
- Hirsau Abbey
- Maulbronn Monastery
