= Weissenau Abbey =

Imperial abbey of the Holy Roman Empire

Coordinates: 47°45′47″N 9°35′46″E

Imperial Abbey of Weissenau Reichsstift Weißenau
- 13th century – 1802
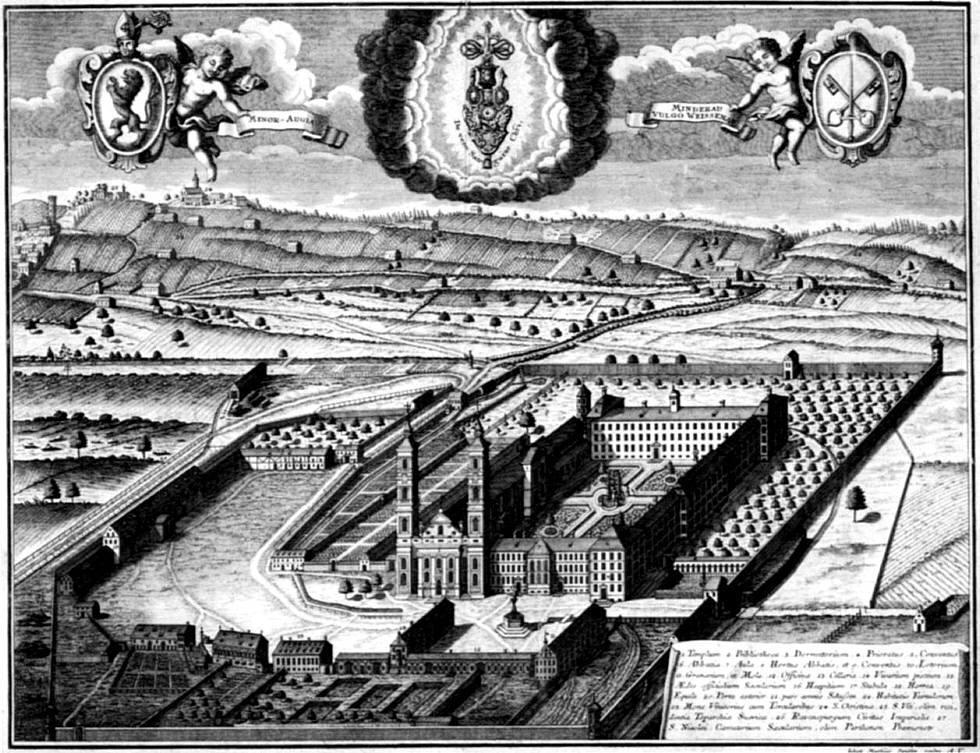
- Engraving of Weissenau Abbey, Johann Mathias Steidlin, 1734
- Status: Imperial Abbey
- Capital: Weißenau
- Common languages: Alemannic German
- Religion: Roman Catholicism
- Government: Elective principality
- Historical era: Middle Ages
  - Founded: 1145 13th century
  - Raised to abbey: 1257
  - Gained Reichsfreiheit: mid-to-late 13th century
  - Received Precious Blood from Rudolph of Habsburg: 1283
  - Joined Council of Princes: 1793
  - Secularised to Sternberg- Manderscheid: 1802
  - Bought by Württemberg: 1835
Succeeded by
Sternberg-Manderscheid

Weissenau Abbey (German: Kloster Weißenau, Reichsstift Weißenau) was an Imperial abbey (Reichsabtei) of the Holy Roman Empire located near Ravensburg in the Swabian Circle. The abbey, a Premonstratensian monastery, was an Imperial Estate and therefore its abbot had a seat and vote in the Reichstag as a prelate of the Swabian Bench. The abbey existed from 1145 until the secularisation of 1802-1803.

== History ==
The site was originally called Au (Latin: Augia, English: meadow), then Minderau (Augia Minor, lesser meadow), and finally Weissenau (Augia Alba or Candida, white meadow). The monastery was founded in 1145 by Gebizo of Ravensburg, a ministerialis of the Welfs, and his sister Luitgarde. Its first monks and their provost Herman (1145–75) came from Rot an der Rot Abbey near Memmingen. The monastery buildings were completed in 1156, and in 1172 the church was dedicated to Our Lady and Saint Peter by Otto, Bishop of Konstanz, to whose diocese it then belonged. During the first few years of its existence it had a nunnery attached, but this was transferred to Weissenthal nearby by Provost Herman, where it continued and existed there until the 15th century.

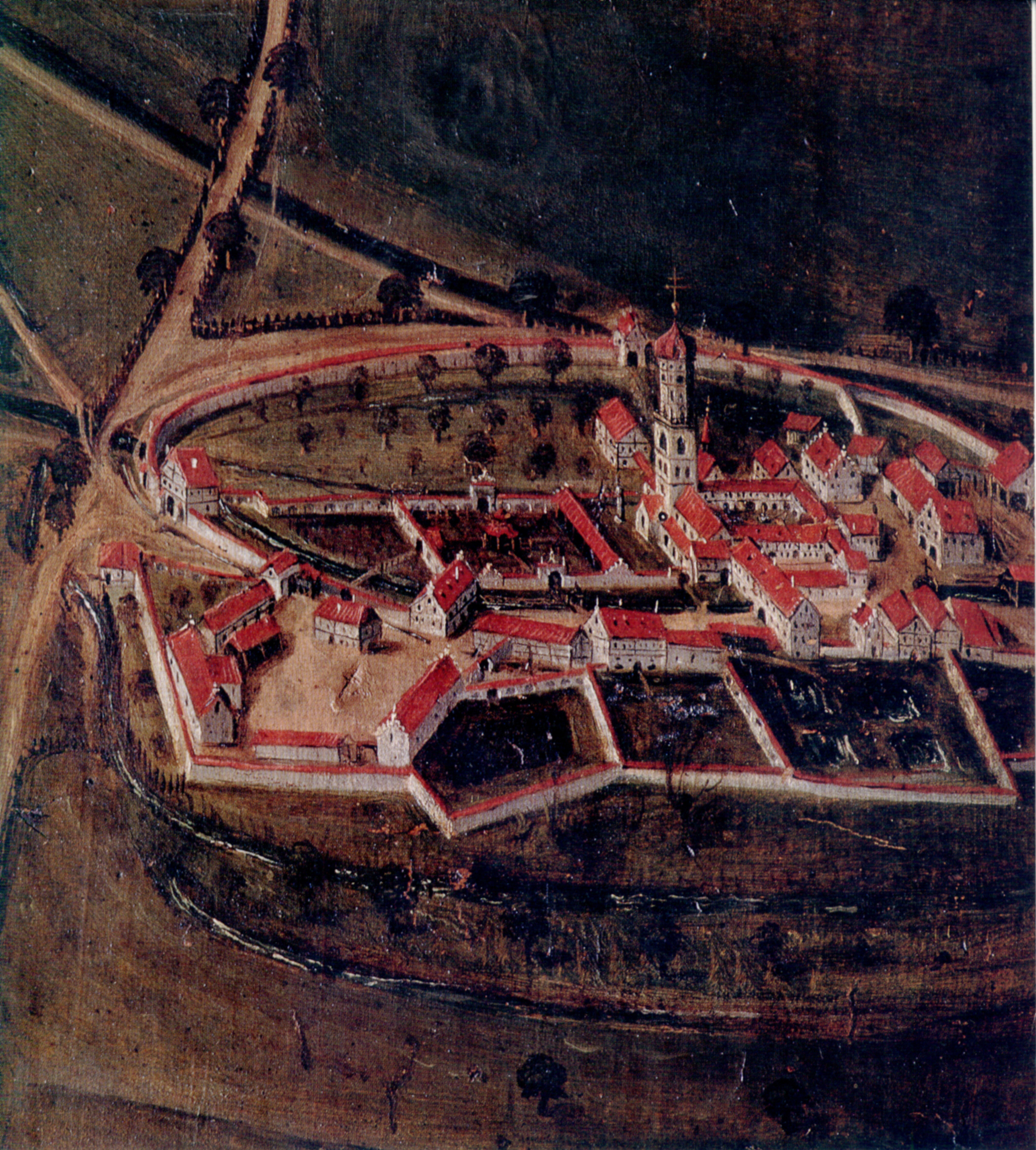
Weissenau Abbey in 1625

The number of canons at Weissenau increased so rapidly that in 1183 the newly founded monastery of Schussenried Abbey was recruited from there. In 1257 Weissenau was raised to the rank of an abbey, with Henry I (1257–66) as its first abbot. It was granted the status of an "Imperial abbey" (i.e., territorially independent) about this time.

In the 13th and 14th centuries, Weissenau was repeatedly pillaged by warring factions. Its most severe trial came during the German Peasants' War, when the canons were temporarily driven out and the abbot, Jacob Murer (1523–33), was replaced by the peasant Johann Wetzel.

Abbot Leopold Mauch (1704–22) began the rebuilding of the abbey in 1708 and of the church in 1717. The church, which is in the Baroque style, was completed in 1724 by his successor, Michael Helmling (1722–24), and the monastic buildings by Anton Unold (1724–65), of which the "Festsaal", still used for concerts, is of particular note for its elaborate stucco work.

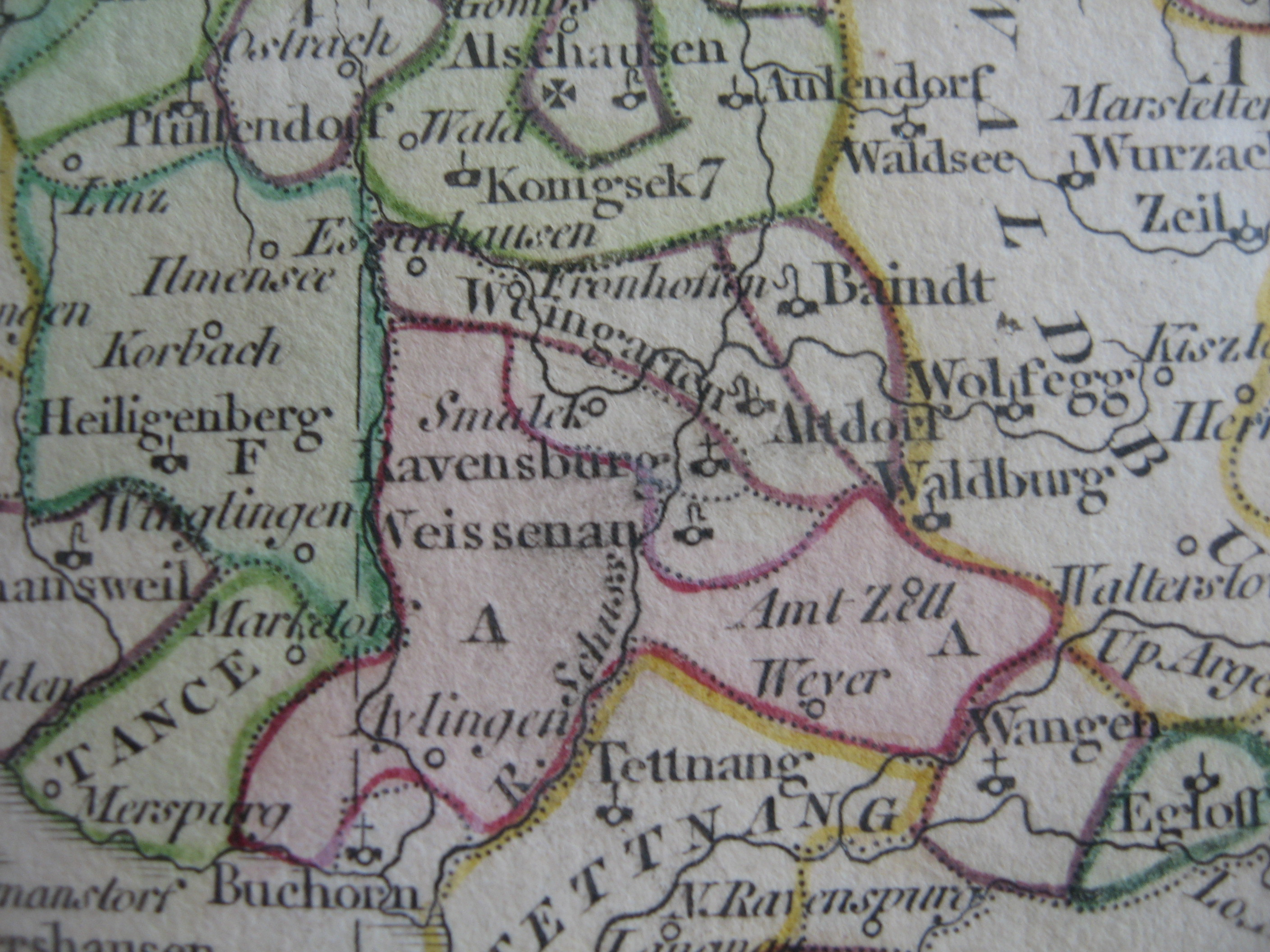
Weissenau and other Imperial abbeys near Ravensburg. Imperial abbots ruled their abbeys as quasi-sovereign monarchs.

At the time of its secularisation in 1802, it had 27 canons, who administered the parishes of Weissenau, St. Jodock, Bodnegg, Grünkraut, Thaldorf, St. Christian, Gornhofen, Obereschach and Obereisenbach. Its possessions comprised 198 estates and its jurisdiction extended over 137 villages. In all, Weissenau had eight provosts and 41 abbots. Its last abbot, Bonaventure Brem (1794–1802), died on 4 August 1818.

After secularisation the former abbey became the property of the Count of Sternberg-Manderscheid, upon whose death it was bought by the government of Württemberg in 1835, but partly resold and turned into a dressmaking and bleaching concern which continued in operation in parts of the outlying premises until 2006. Since 1892, the principal buildings have been used as an asylum for the insane, the present psychiatric clinic "Die Weissenau", which also occupied the former abbots' summer residence at Rahlenhof until recently.

== Procession of the Holy Blood ==
Weissenau became very well known on account of the relic of the Blood of Christ which it received from Rudolph of Habsburg in 1283. Up to 1783 the famous Blutritt (English: Procession of the Holy Blood), similar to that of the neighbouring Weingarten Abbey, took place every year. It consisted of a solemn procession during which the relic was carried by a priest on horseback, accompanied by many other riders and a large crowd. The relic is still preserved in the old abbey church, which now serves as the parish church of Weissenau. Reference to it is made in the medieval epic Lohengrin.

== Gallery ==
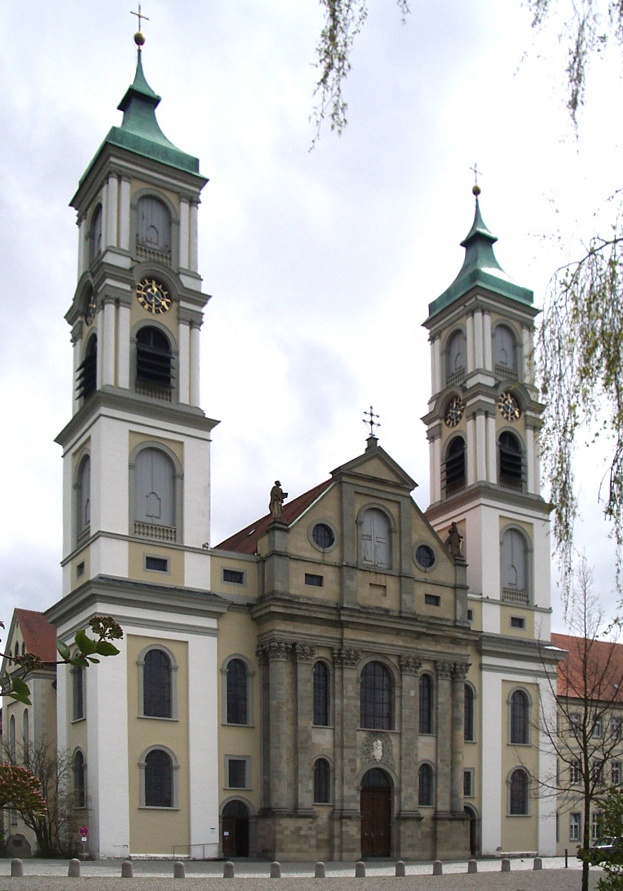
Former abbey church, Weissenau

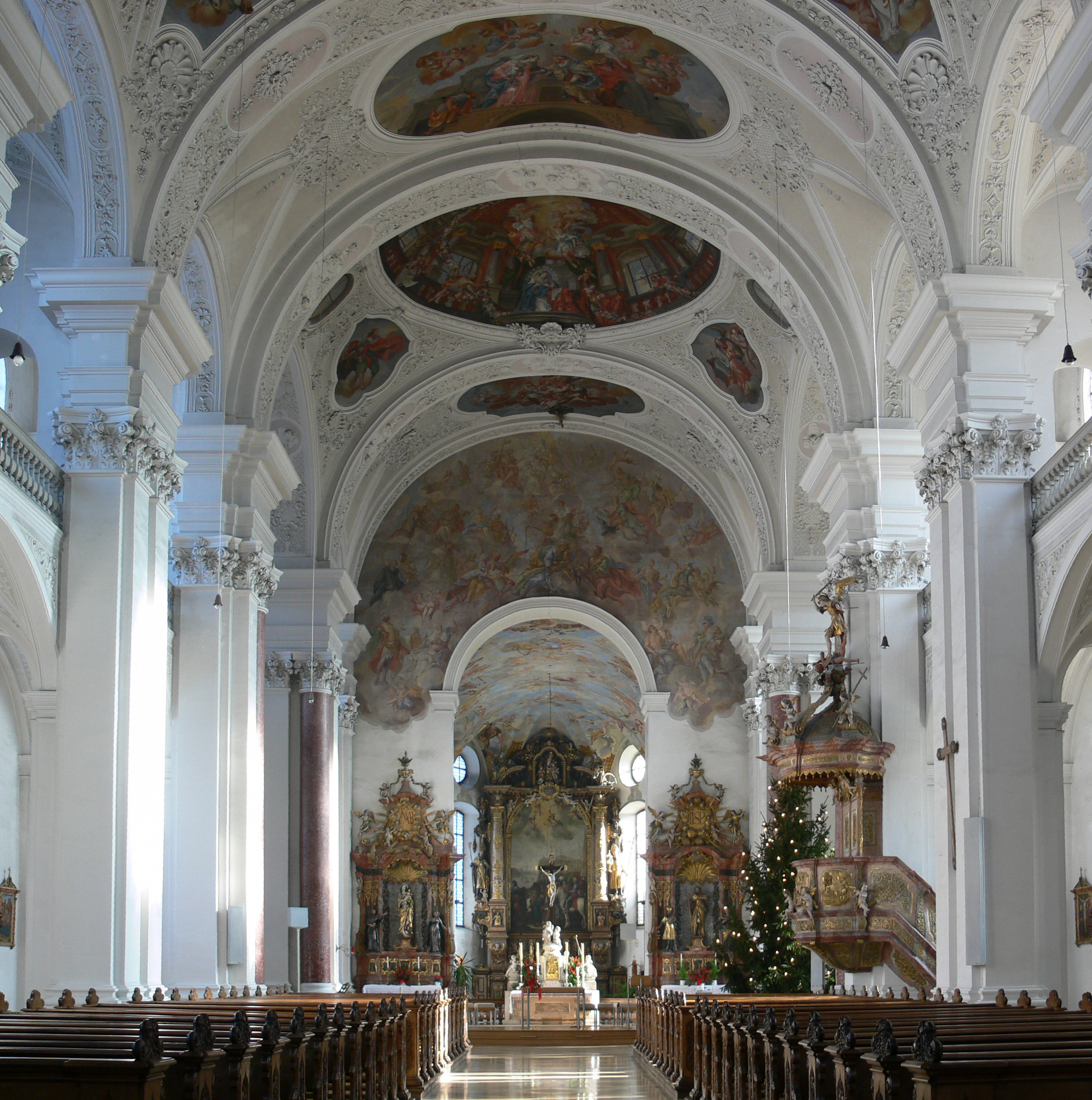
Weissenau Abbey church interior

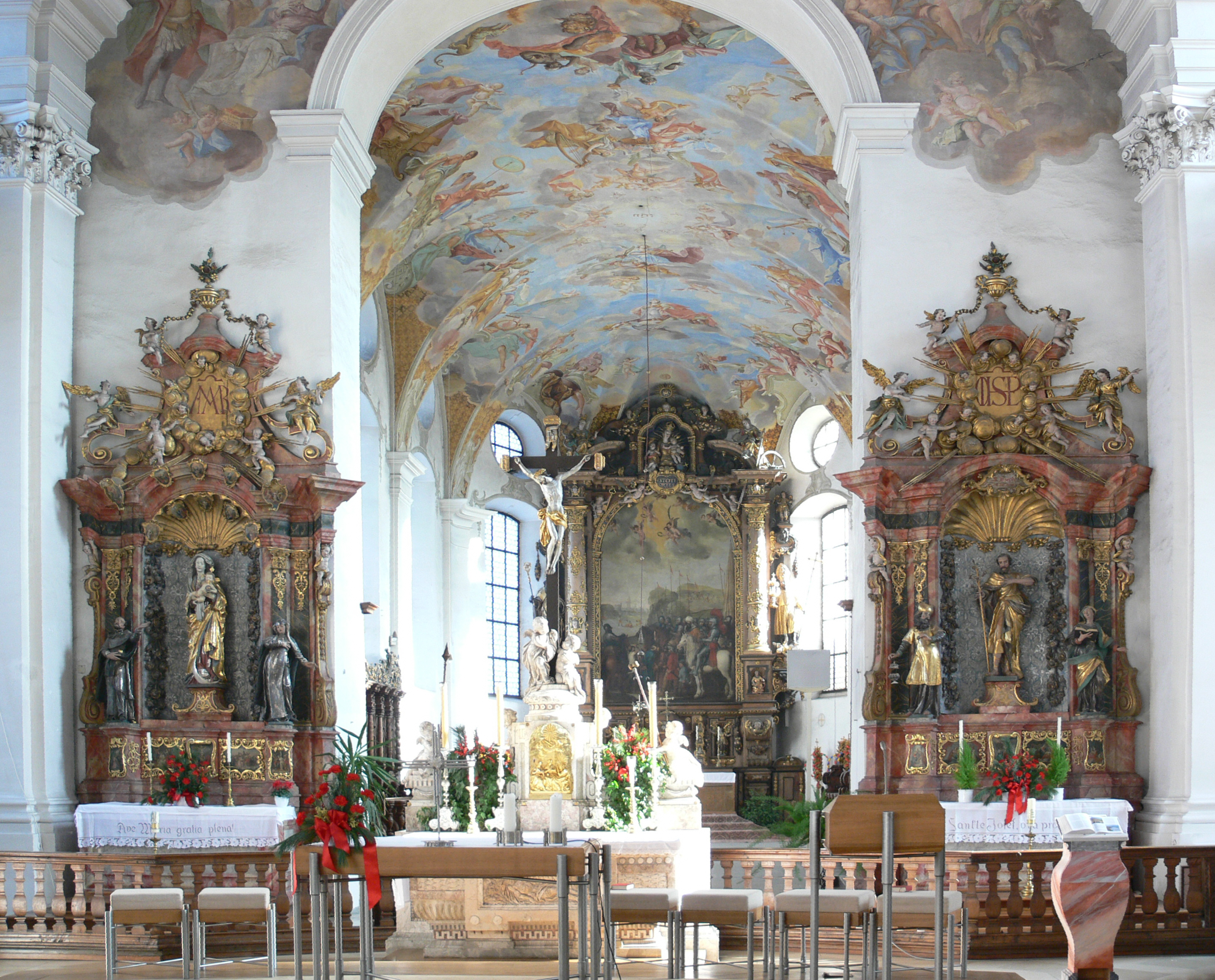
Altars and choir

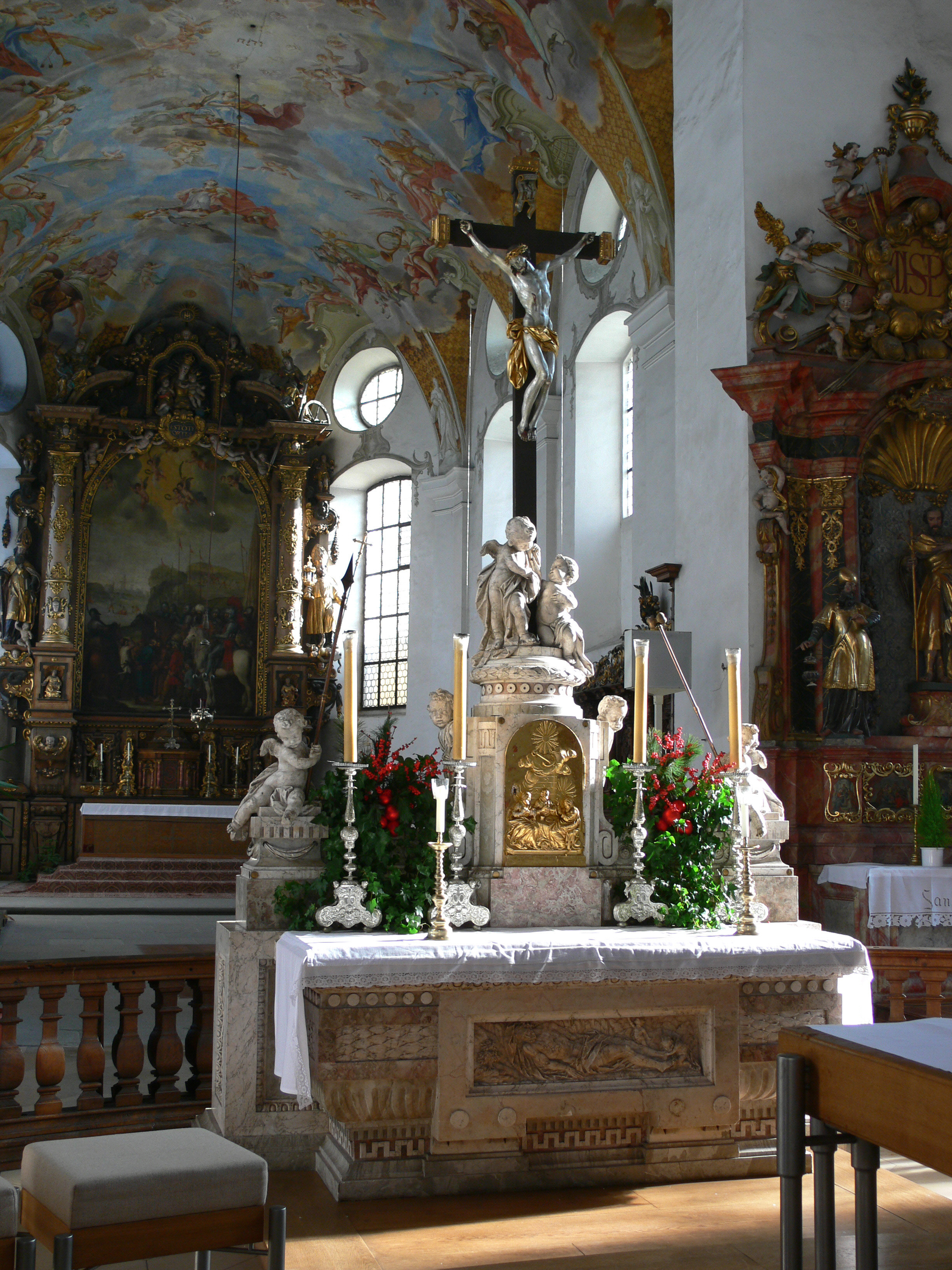
Cross Altar

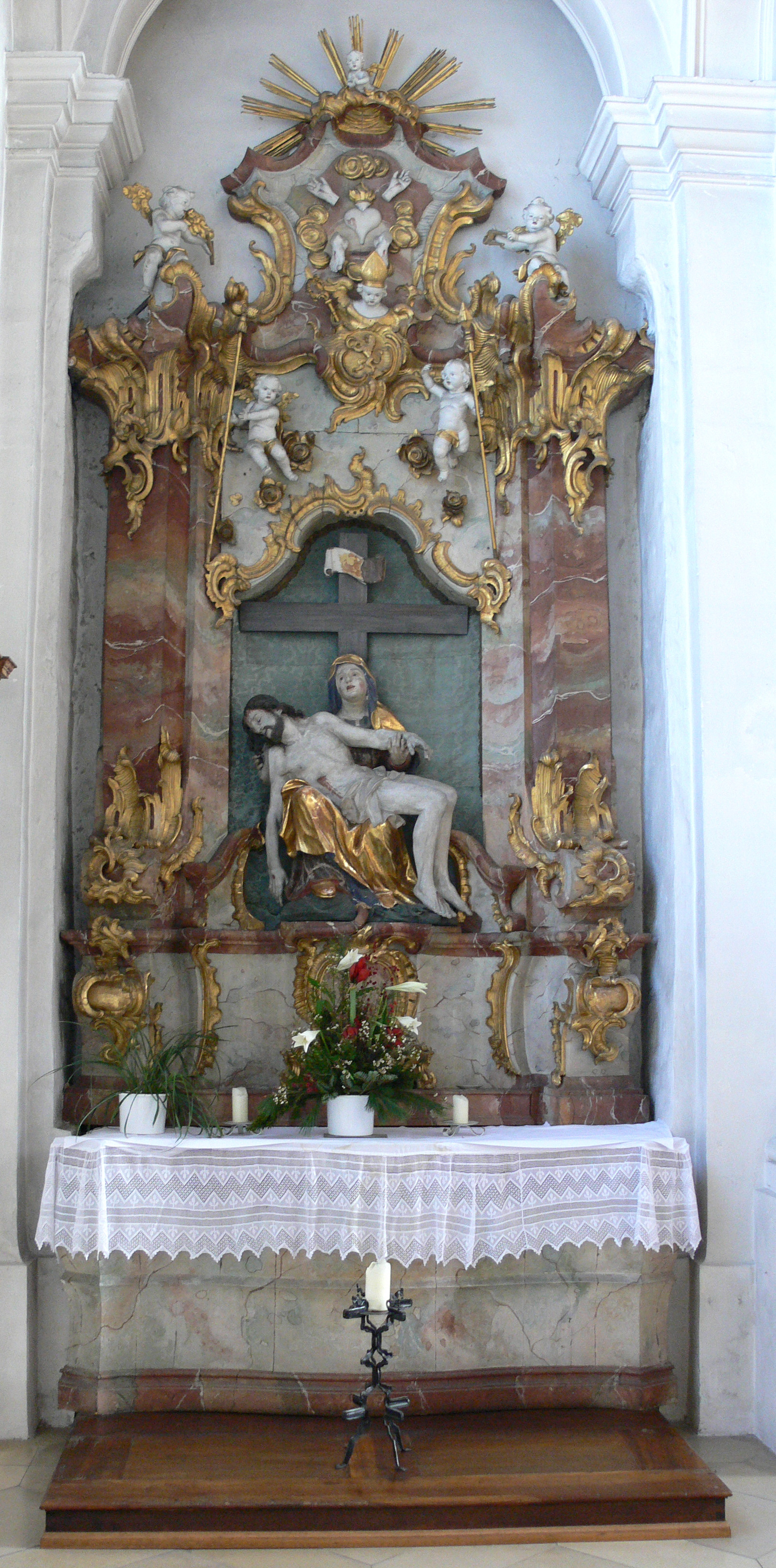
Side altar

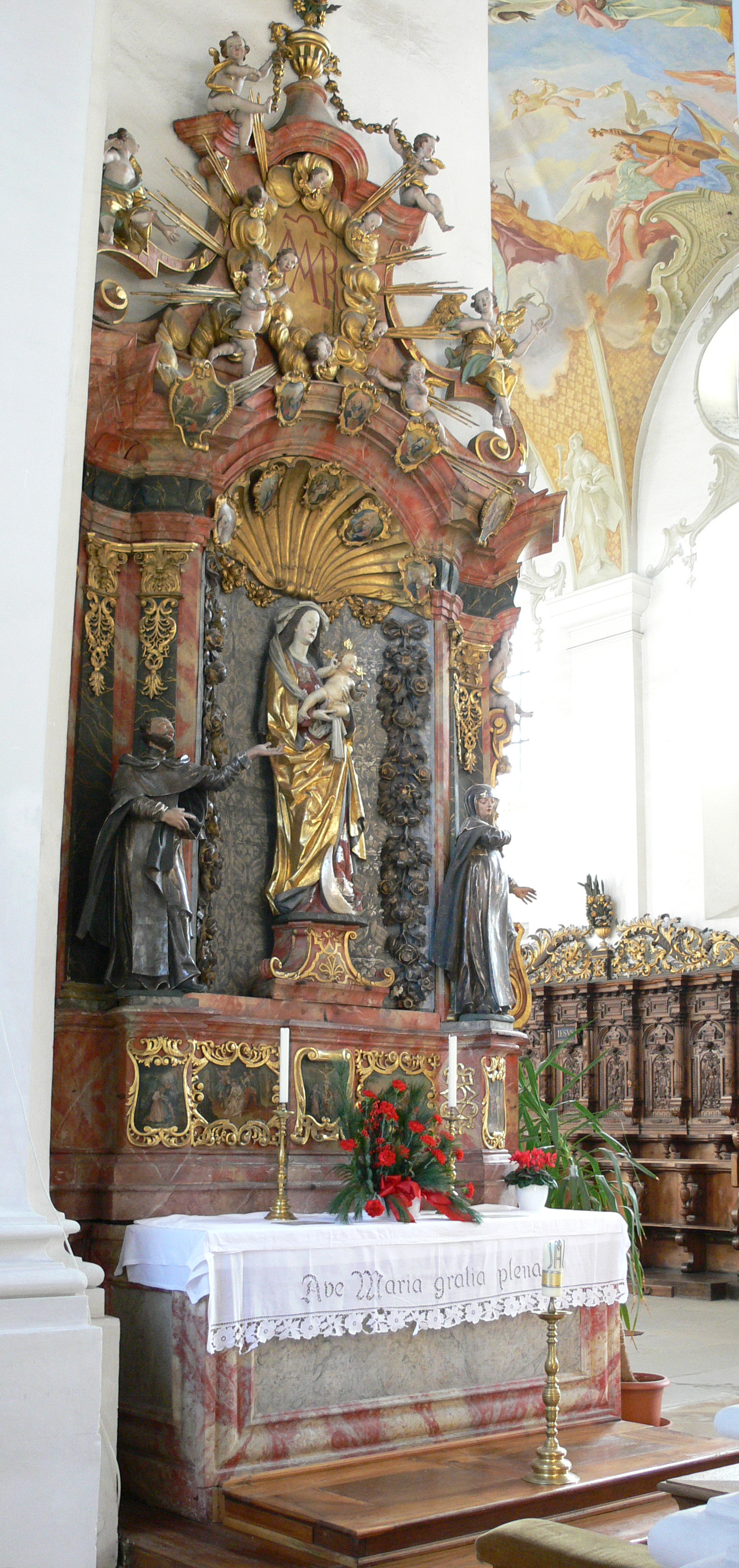
Side altar

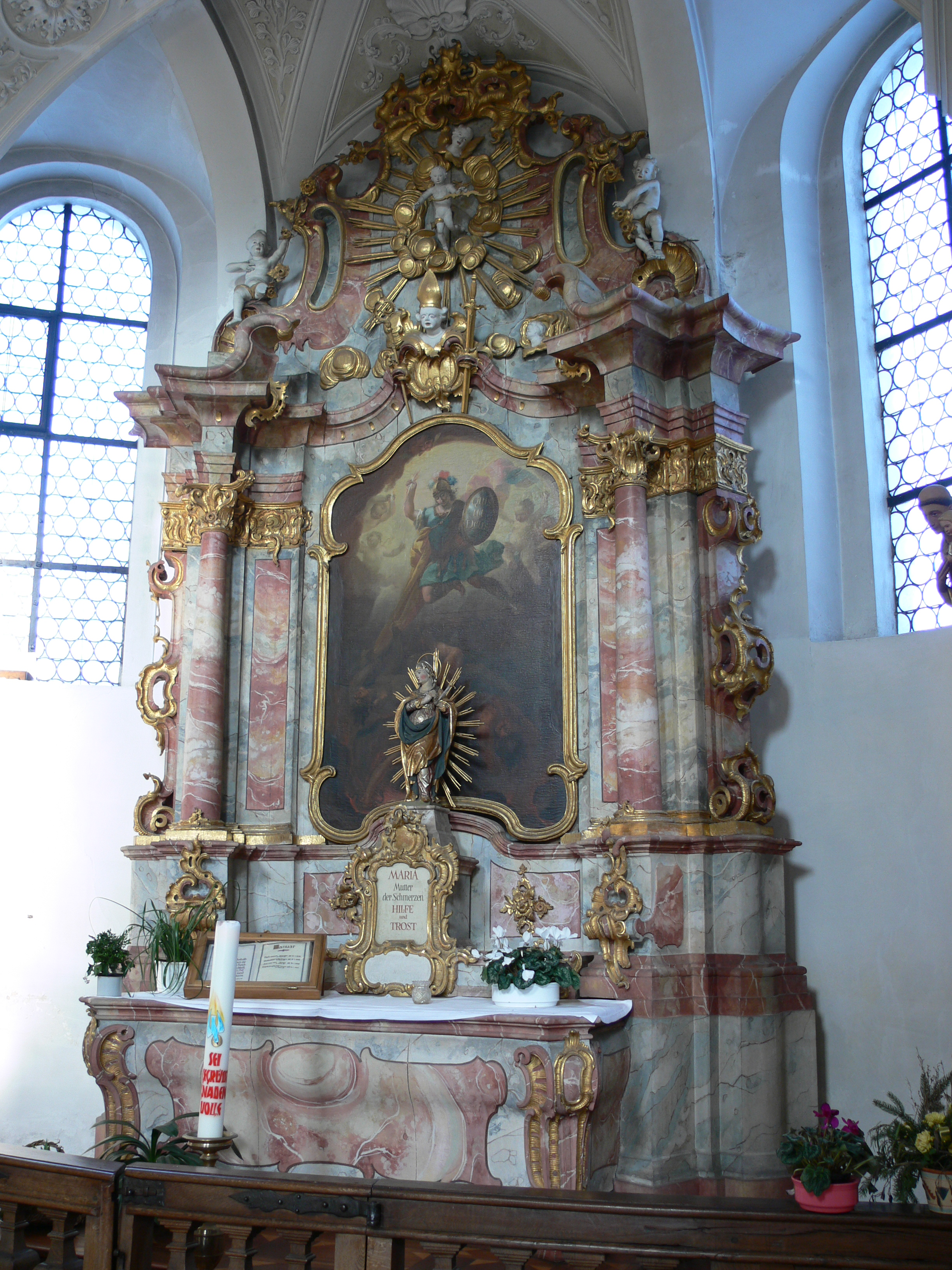
Side altar

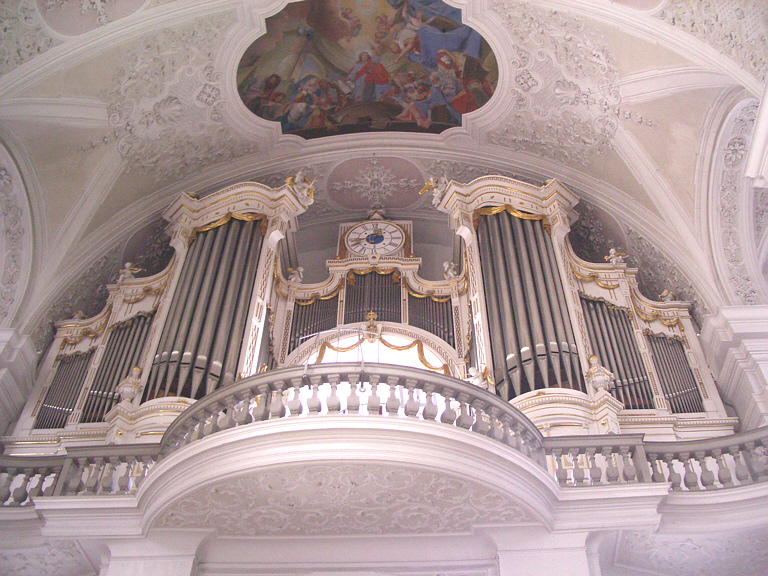
Organ
