= Franz Martin Kuen =

German painter (1719–1771)

Franz Martin Kuen (November 8, 1719 – January 30, 1771) was a German Rococo painter. He painted the ceiling of Wiblingen Abbey. He stayed in Venice in 1746, where he met Giovanni Battista Tiepolo (1696-1770).
