= Rot an der Rot Abbey =

Coordinates: 48.015°N 10.030°E

Imperial Abbey of Rot an der Rot Reichsabtei Rot an der Rot
- 1497–1803
- Coat of arms

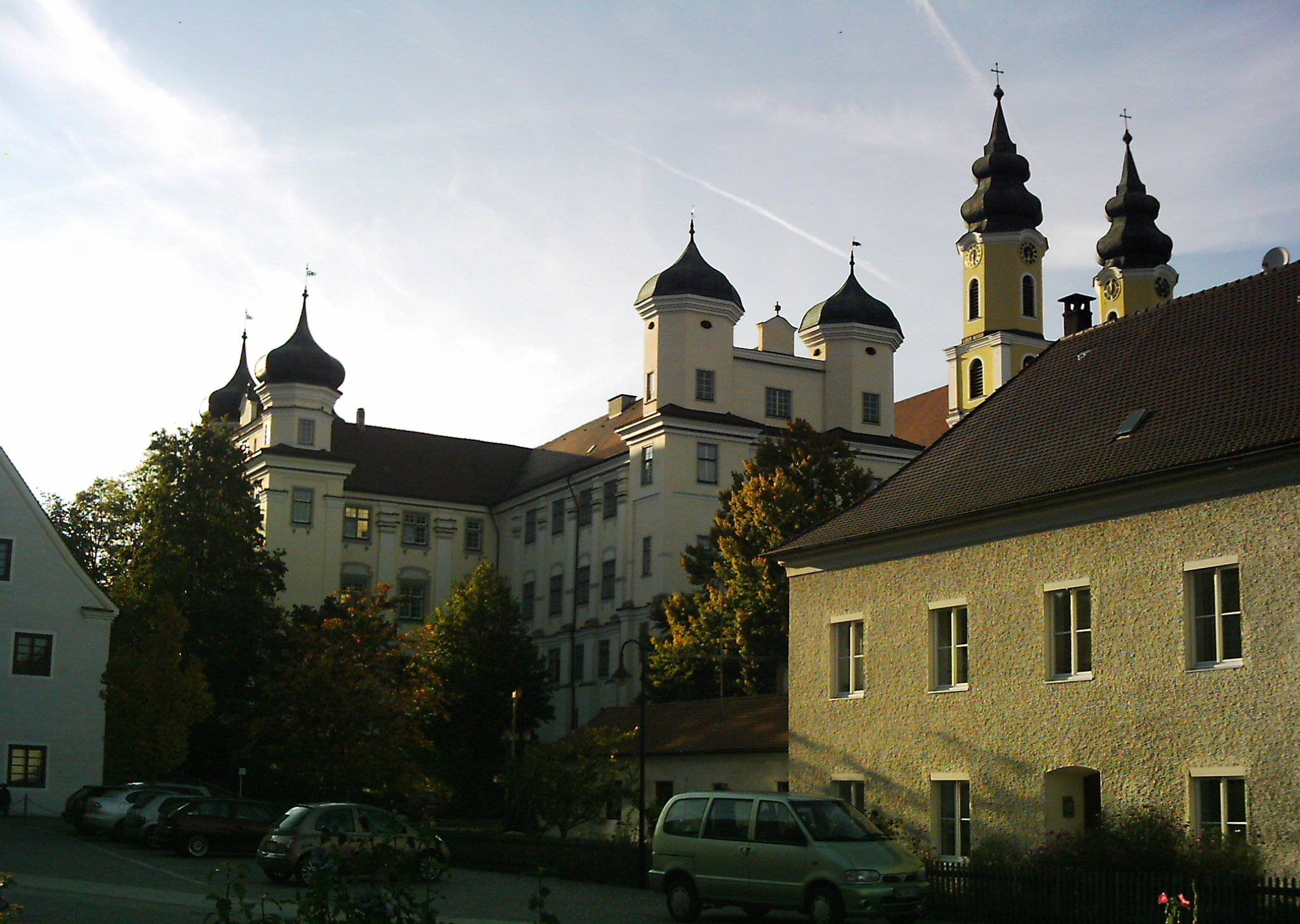
- View of the monastery
- Status: Imperial Abbey
- Capital: Rot an der Rot Abbey
- Government: Theocracy
- Historical era: Middle Ages
  - Founded (by St Norbert?): 1126
  - Placed under Imperial protection by Barbarossa: 1179 1497
  - Exempted from secular courts: 1338
  - Granted Imp. immediacy by Maximilian I: 1497
  - Leopold of Austria mortgaged high justice to abbey^{a}: 1619
  - Looted repeated during Thirty Years' War^{b}: 1618–48
  - Mediatised to Wartenberg: 1803
  - Mediatised to Württemberg: 1806
Succeeded by
County of Wartenberg
- Today part of: Germany
- a: The rights to deliver high justice for Tyrol were only effected during the War of the Austrian Succession (1740–48). b: As well as being looted more than 200 times during the Thirty Years' War (1618–48), the abbey was also looted during the German Peasants' War (1525) and the Schmalkaldic War (1546).

Rot an der Rot Abbey (also referred to as Roth, Münchroth, Münchenroth, Mönchroth or Mönchsroth) was a Premonstratensian monastery in Rot an der Rot in Upper Swabia, Baden-Württemberg, Germany. It was the first Premonstratensian monastery in the whole of Swabia. The imposing structure of the former monastery is situated on a hill between the valleys of the rivers Rot and Haslach. The monastery church, dedicated to St Verena, and the convent buildings are an important part of the Upper Swabian Baroque Route. Apart from the actual monastic buildings, a number of other structures have been preserved among which are the gates and the economy building.

== History ==
=== Foundation and early history ===
Rot an der Rot was first mentioned as Rota in a donation by Adelbert von Wolfertschwenden around the year 1100. Together with the church and the inn, the village formed most likely the centre of a manor.

According to local tradition the monastery was founded under the name of Mönchroth in 1126 by Hemma von Wildenberg with active participation of Norbert of Xanten. Even though the foundation date is confirmed by an entry in the annals of Altenmarkt Abbey, also a Premonstratensian monastery, the personal involvement of Norbert of Xanten cannot be definitely ascertained. The first monks to settle at Rot an der Rot Abbey were French Premonstratensians. Presumably, from the time of its foundation the monastery was directly subordinate to the pope and not to a local or regional ecclesiastical chapter. Shortly after 1126, probably around 1140, a nunnery was added to Rot an der Rot Abbey, which was not unusual for the Premonstratensian order. By close proximity to a monastery the nuns were provided with protection and pastoral care. This nunnery continued to exist until the second half of the 14th century.

The first prior of the abbey was Burkhard sent by Norbert of Xanten from the mother house Prémontré near Laon in northern France together with twelve monks. Burkhard's work was so successful that in 1137 the first filial institution was founded in Wilten near Innsbruck following a request by bishop Reginbert of Brixen. Burkhard's successor, abbot Ottino (1140–82), led the monastery, consisting by now of approximately 200 monks, to its first prosperous period and increased the number of filial institutions. Between 1145 and 1171 the following monasteries were founded: Weissenau Abbey, Schussenried Abbey, Steingaden Abbey, Kaiserslautern and Marchtal Abbey. In 1182 the abbey had possessions not only around Rot an der Rot and in the nearby valley of the Iller but also had managed to acquire possessions on the Swabian Jura, near Lindau, around Hüttisheim, Steinbach and Untermoorweiler.

=== High and Late Middle Ages ===
In a charter dated from 1179, Emperor Frederick Barbarossa declared himself Vogt of the abbey, laying the foundation for the later Imperial immediacy.

In 1182 a devastating conflagration destroyed the original foundation documents and imperial privileges. A Papal bull by Lucius III published the same year replaced the lost documents and assigned the foundation of the monastery to Hemma von Wildenberg and two of her male relatives.

By 1182 the village of Rot was completely in the possession of the monastery being the administrative and pastoral centre of the parish, and consequently became integrated into the economic structure of the monastery. By acquisitions and donations the abbey managed to extend its possessions until its territory was a closed area around the villages of Rot and Haslach. By incorporating parishes, the monastery also secured its economic prosperity.

In 1338 the abbey received a grant exempting it from the jurisdiction of secular courts.

Following the Great Plague of 1348 fewer members of the landed gentry joined the monastery but more and more farmers and members of the middle class resulting in a decrease in the acquisition of lands. Crop failures, fires, wars and an economic crisis lasting for decades accelerated the decline of the abbey until, in 1391, only three monks were left.

The abbot of Weissenau Abbey, an abbey founded as a filial institution by monks from Rot an der Rot, finally took control and in 1407 King Rupert installed Seneschal John II of Waldburg as governor of the abbey.

The restoration of the fortunes of Rot an der Rot Abbey began with Abbot Henrich Merk (1417–20) and was continued by his successor Martin Hesser (1420–57), who was also called the second founder of Rot an der Rot. In Constance in 1425 an alliance was forged with most of the other Swabian abbots to defend the monasteries' rights against the intervention of noble family members of monks. Martin Hesser also expedited the restoration of monastic life and the restitution of the monastery's mortgaged and sold property as well as the rebuilding of the monastery buildings. Since 1458 Rot an der Rot Abbey had the financially lucrative right to occupy the incorporated parishes with priest from the monastery.

In 1481 a fire destroyed almost the whole monastery. The rebuilding of the monastery lasted until 1509 when the new church was dedicated.

=== Reichsfreiheit ===
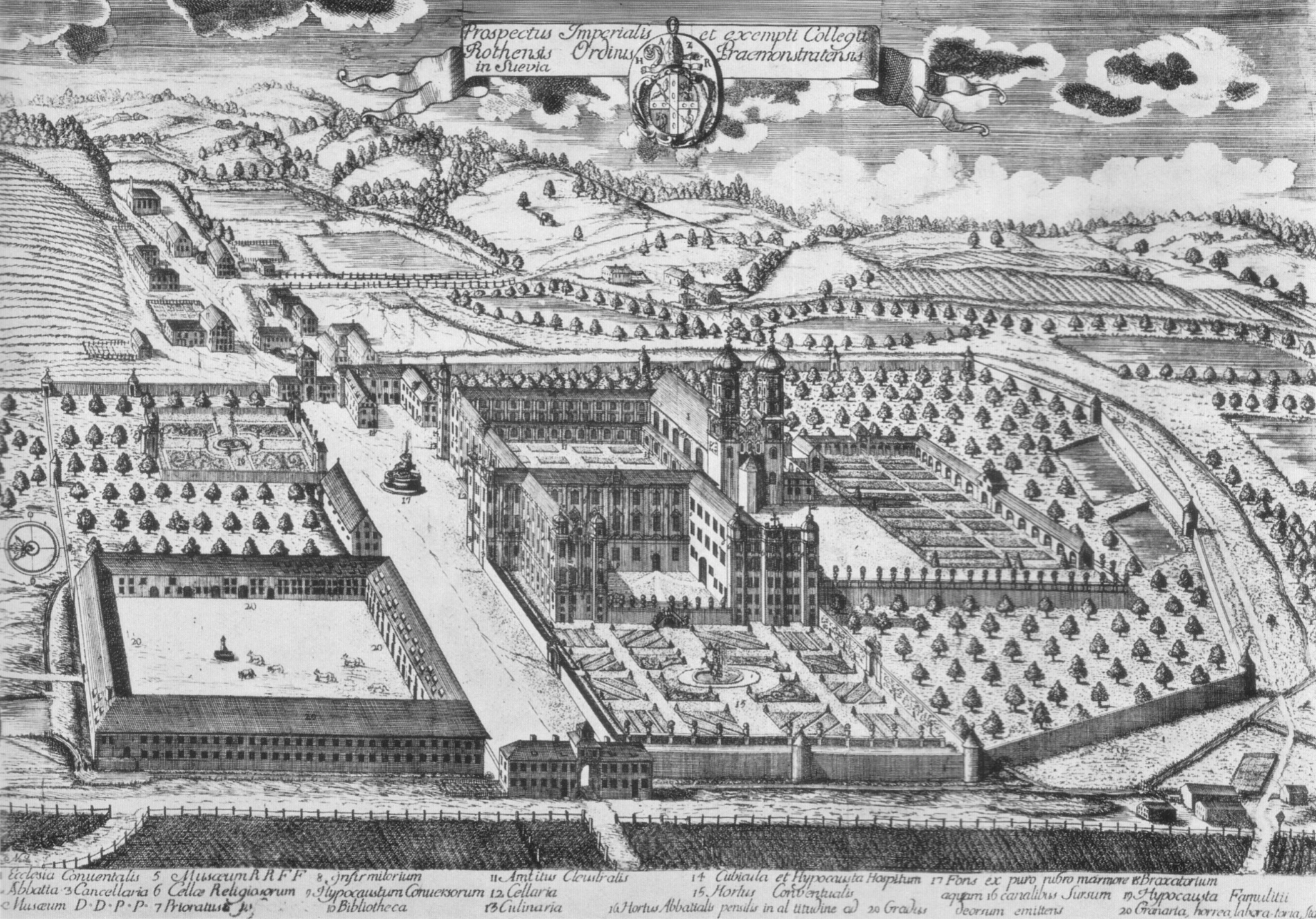
Rot an der Rot Abbey (engraving from 1736

Emperor Maximilian I elevated Rot an der Rot Abbey to the status of Imperial Abbey in 1497. The abbey gained imperial immediacy and the abbot became a member of the Swabian College of Imperial Prelates contributing to the Council of the Princes in the Imperial Diet of the Holy Roman Empire.

However, following repeated lootings during the German Peasants' War in 1525 and the Schmalkaldic War in 1546 the fortunes of the abbey went again into decline which was only stopped by cautious reforms introduced by Abbot Martin Ehrmann (1560–89).

The abbey's position of imperial immediacy was strengthened when in 1619 Leopold of Tyrol mortgaged right to inflict high justice to Rot an der Rot Abbey, which, however, entailed also higher financial contributions to the imperial coffers. This privilege was only effected during the War of the Austrian Succession (1740–48).

During a visitation in 1601 Rot an der Rot Abbey was considered to be in perfect state. Yet, during the Thirty Years' War (1618–48) the abbey was looted more than 200 times. After the end of the war and a period of consolidation, Abbot Martin Erde (1672–1711) endeavored to re-establish religious discipline and learning among the clerics and also attempted to improve the economic situation of the monastery. However, in 1681 most of the abbey was destroyed during a fire.

Between 1681 and 1698 the whole monastery complex was rebuilt in Baroque-style.

The present-day monastery complex is towered by the neoclassicist monastery church St Verena. It was rebuilt between 1777 and 1786 and newly furnished since Abbot Mauritius Moritz had started with the demolishing of the older church against the wishes of the convent. The architect Johann Baptist Laub had the eastern part of the church erected but the real reconstruction commenced only under Abbot Willebold Held (1782–89). After the foundation stone was laid in 1783 most of the work was carried out by the canons themselves. The interior was designed by the painters Meinrad von Ow and Januarius Zick whereas the plaster was designed by Franz Xaver Feuchtmayer. The construction of the massive organ by Johann Nepomuk Holzhey began in 1792 and finished the following year. Adjoined to the church the new monastery building was built. At the bottom of the hill where the monastery is situated the square economy building was raised.

The last Abbot of Rot an der Rot Abbey was Nikolaus Betscher (1789–1803) whose compositions are reminiscent of the church music composed by his contemporaries Joseph Haydn and Wolfgang Amadeus Mozart. Bretscher's work has come to the attention of a wider public again by being publicly performed after having been neglected for a long time.

From 1725 onwards great sums were allocated to increase the library stock. Records from 1796 show that the library, established in 1502, had more than 7000 books in its possession. After the dissolution of the monastery the content of the library was dispersed.

=== Dissolution ===
In 1803 the abbey was dissolved during the secularisation of secular and ecclesiastical states and the monks were forced to leave the premises. The monastery's possessions of thirteen villages and hamlets with a total of 2871 subjects were taken over by the Counts of Wartenberg in compensation for territories they had lost left of the river Rhine. In 1806 the monastery and village of Rot an der Rot was incorporated into the newly founded Kingdom of Württemberg. In 1808 the Counts of Erbach-Erbach inherited the former abbey. In the 19th century, two wings of the monastery building and the library were demolished.

In 1947 the Premonstratensians bought the monastery building and returned to Rot an der Rot. However, the attempt to re-establish monastic life failed and in 1959 the buildings were bought by the Roman Catholic Diocese of Rottenburg-Stuttgart. Today the former monastery is home to the educational and recreational establishment St Norbert run by Premonstratensian nuns who founded a community in Rot an der Rot in 1950.

== Gallery ==
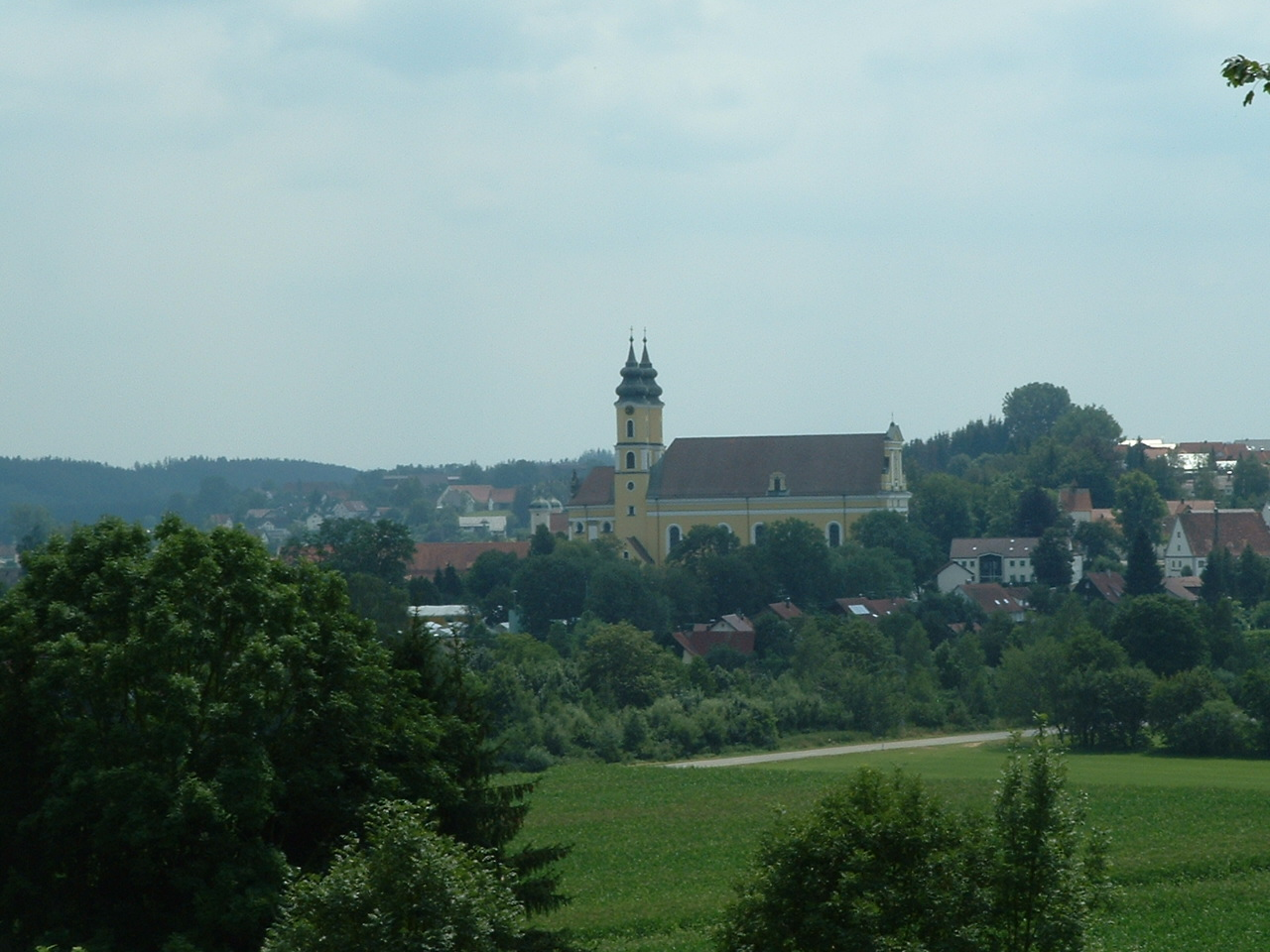
Parish church St Verena

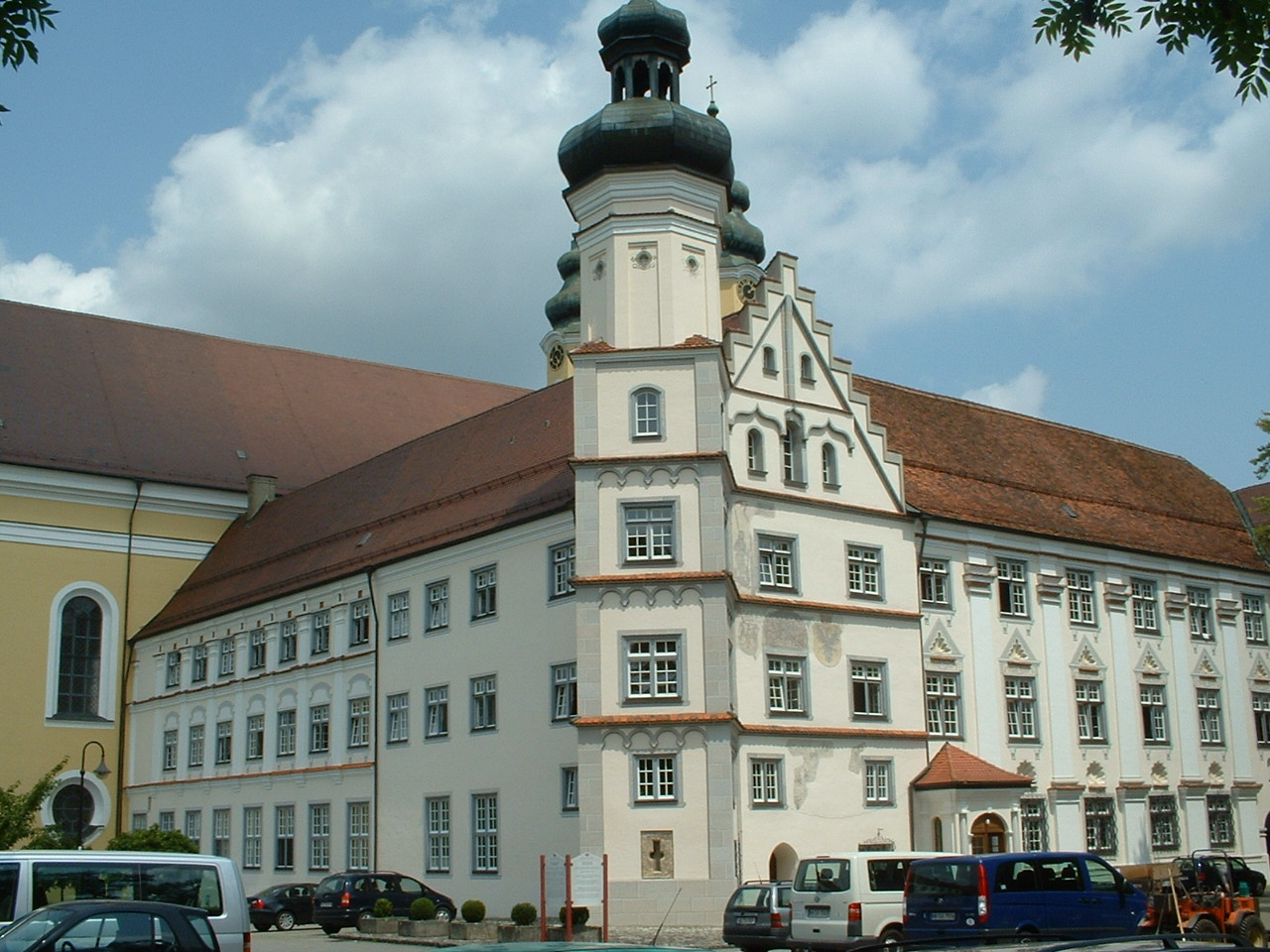
Monastery building

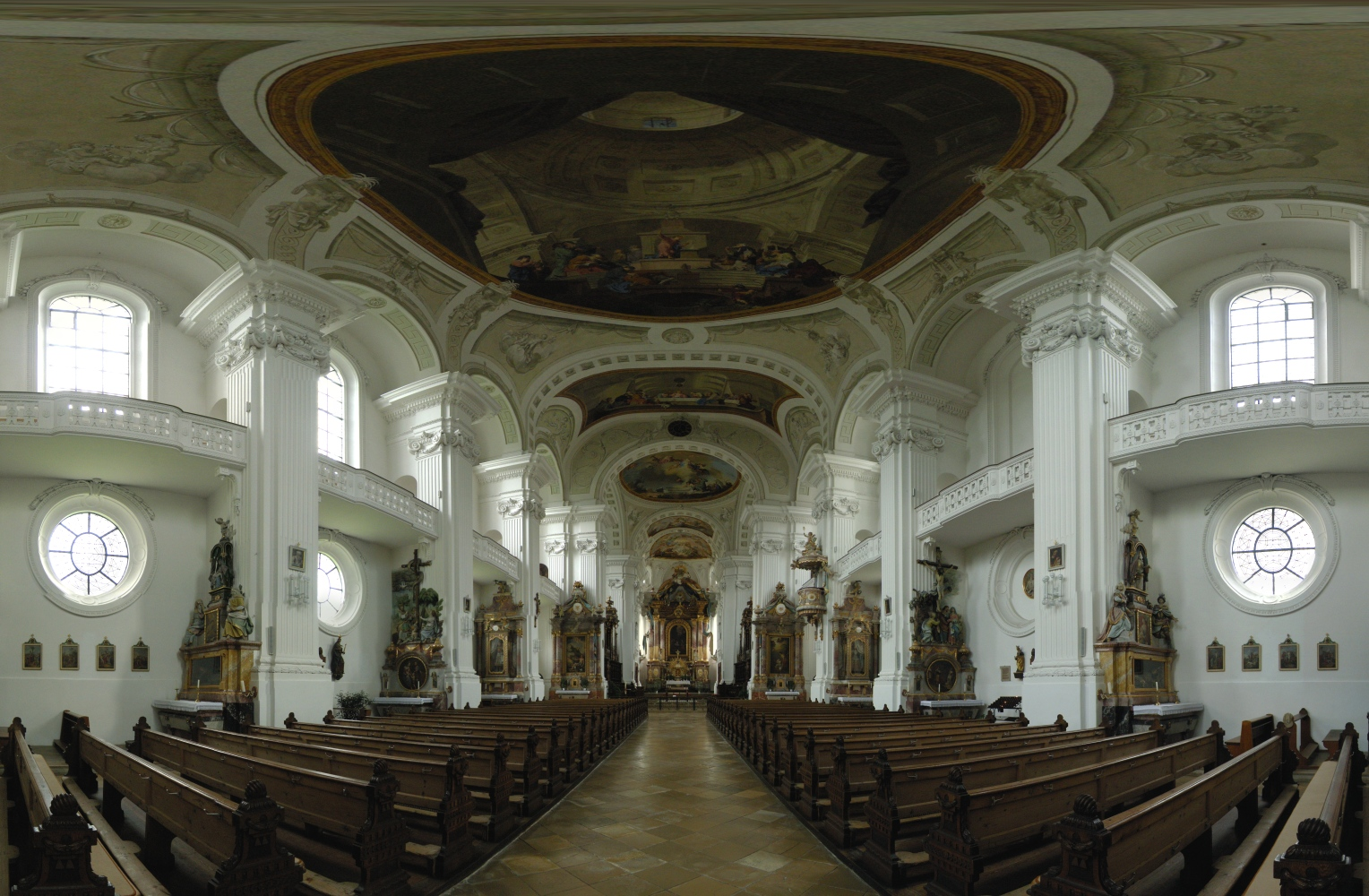
Interior of parish church of St Verena

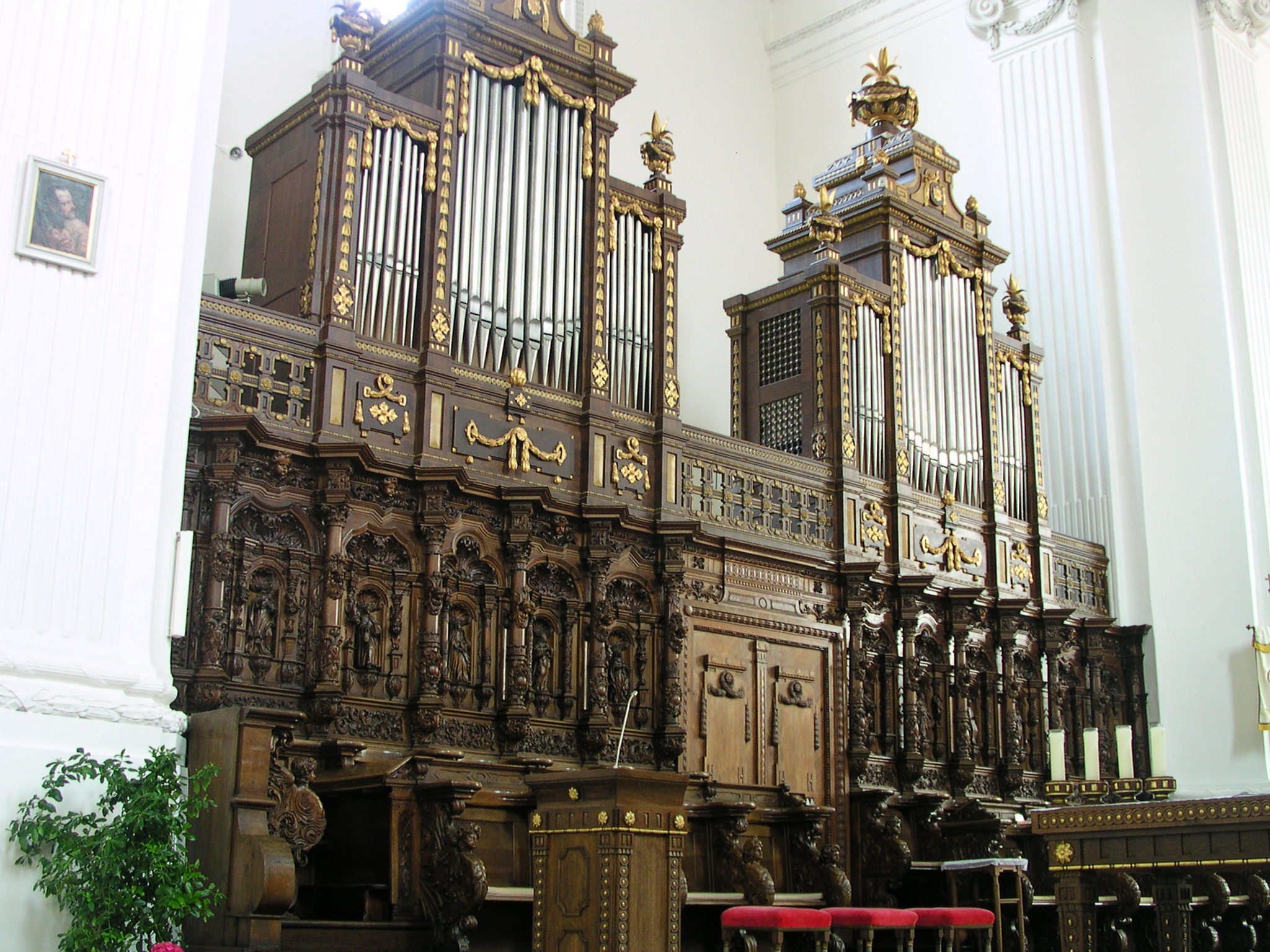
Choir stalls and organ in St Verena

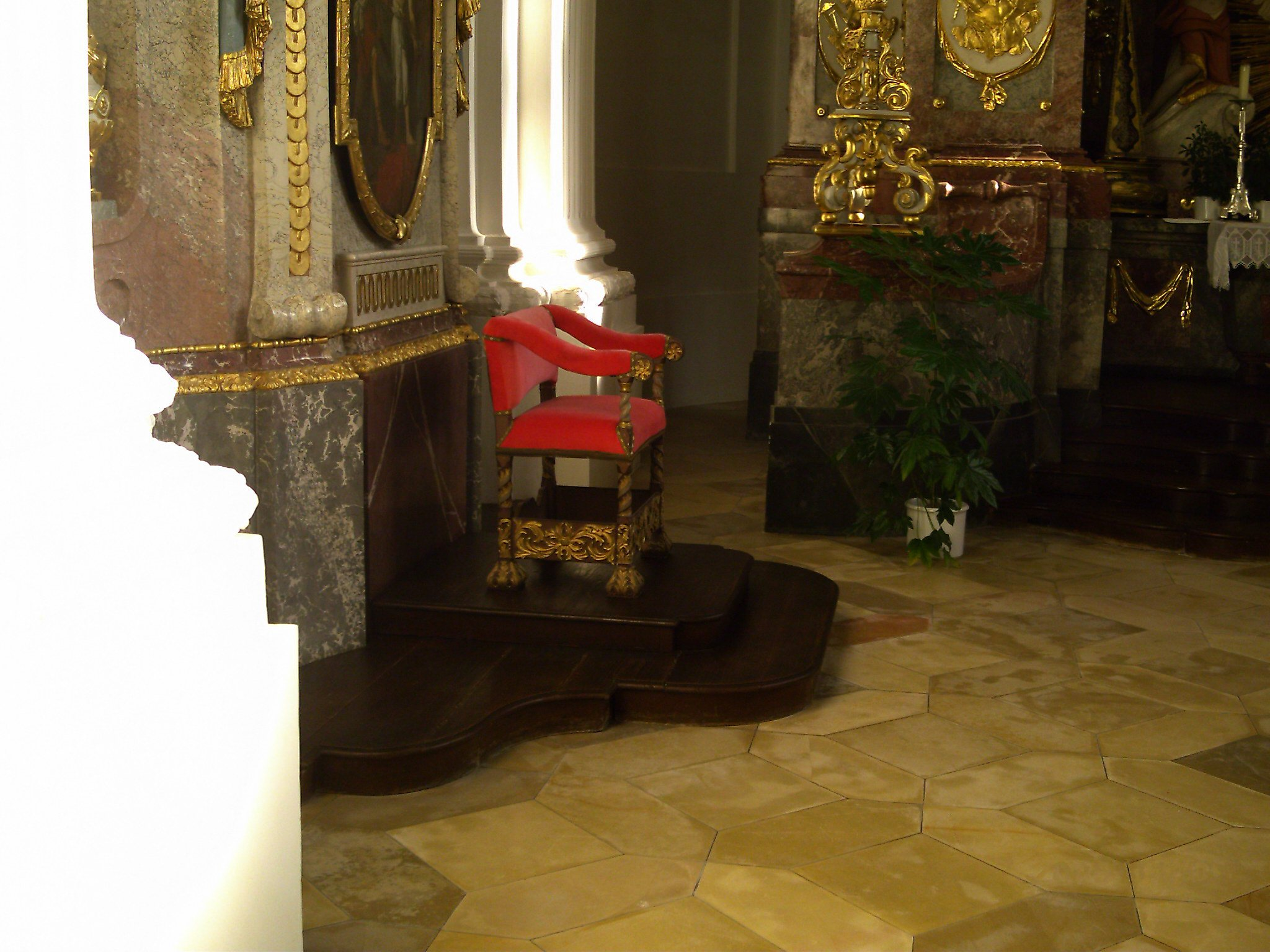
Abbot's throne

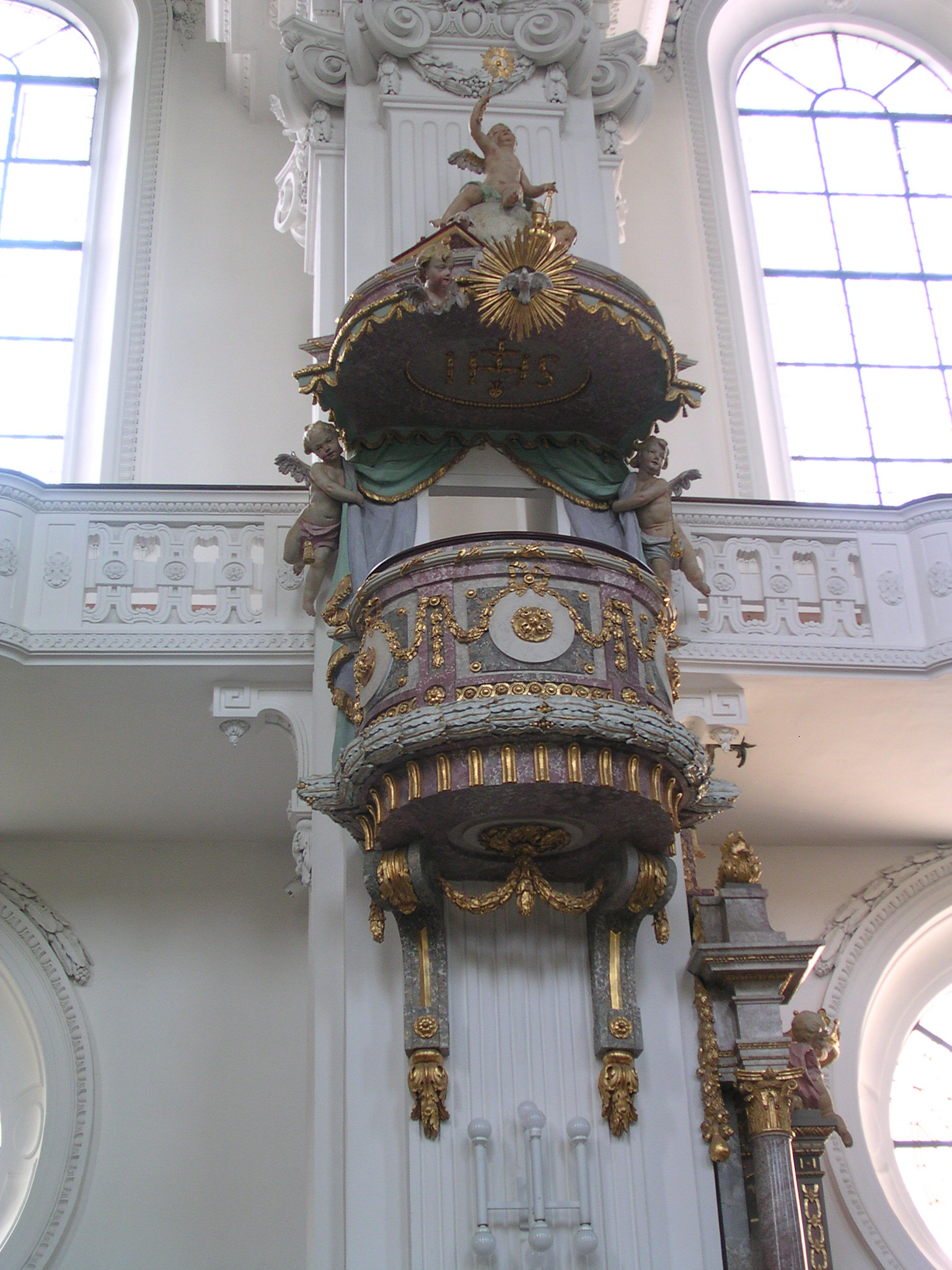
Parish church St Verena, pulpit

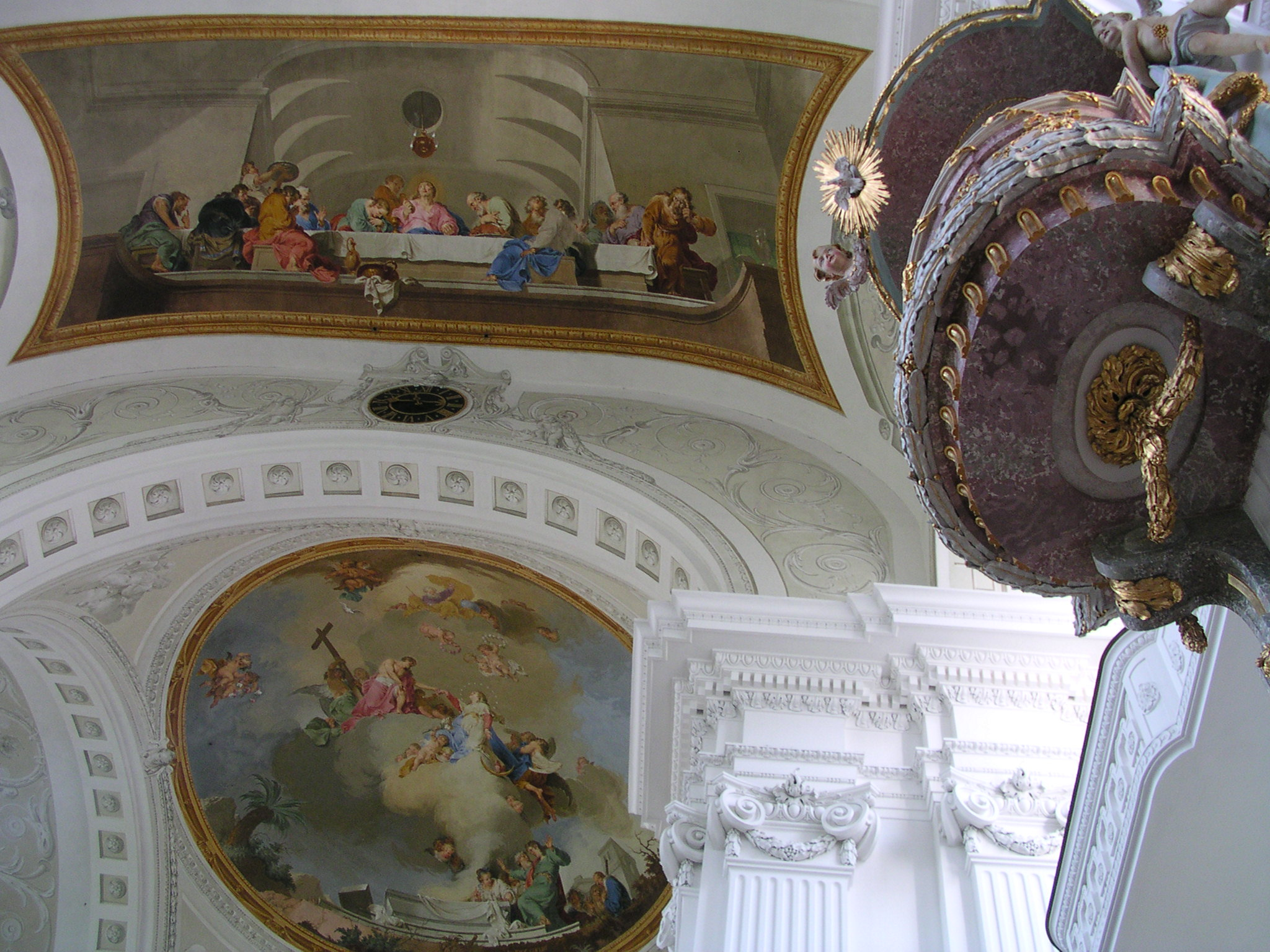
Fresco by Januarius Zick in monastery church St Verena

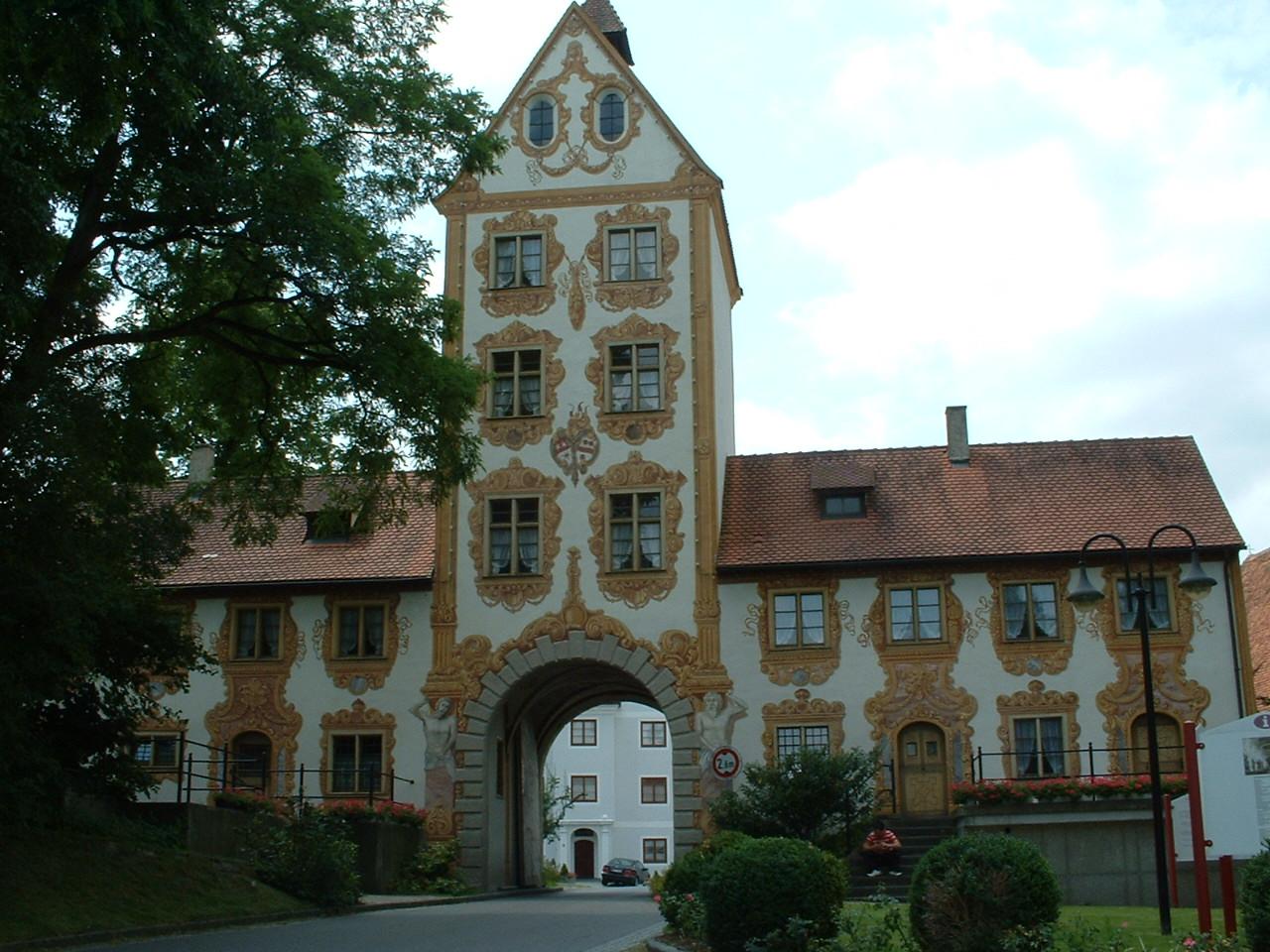
Upper Gate

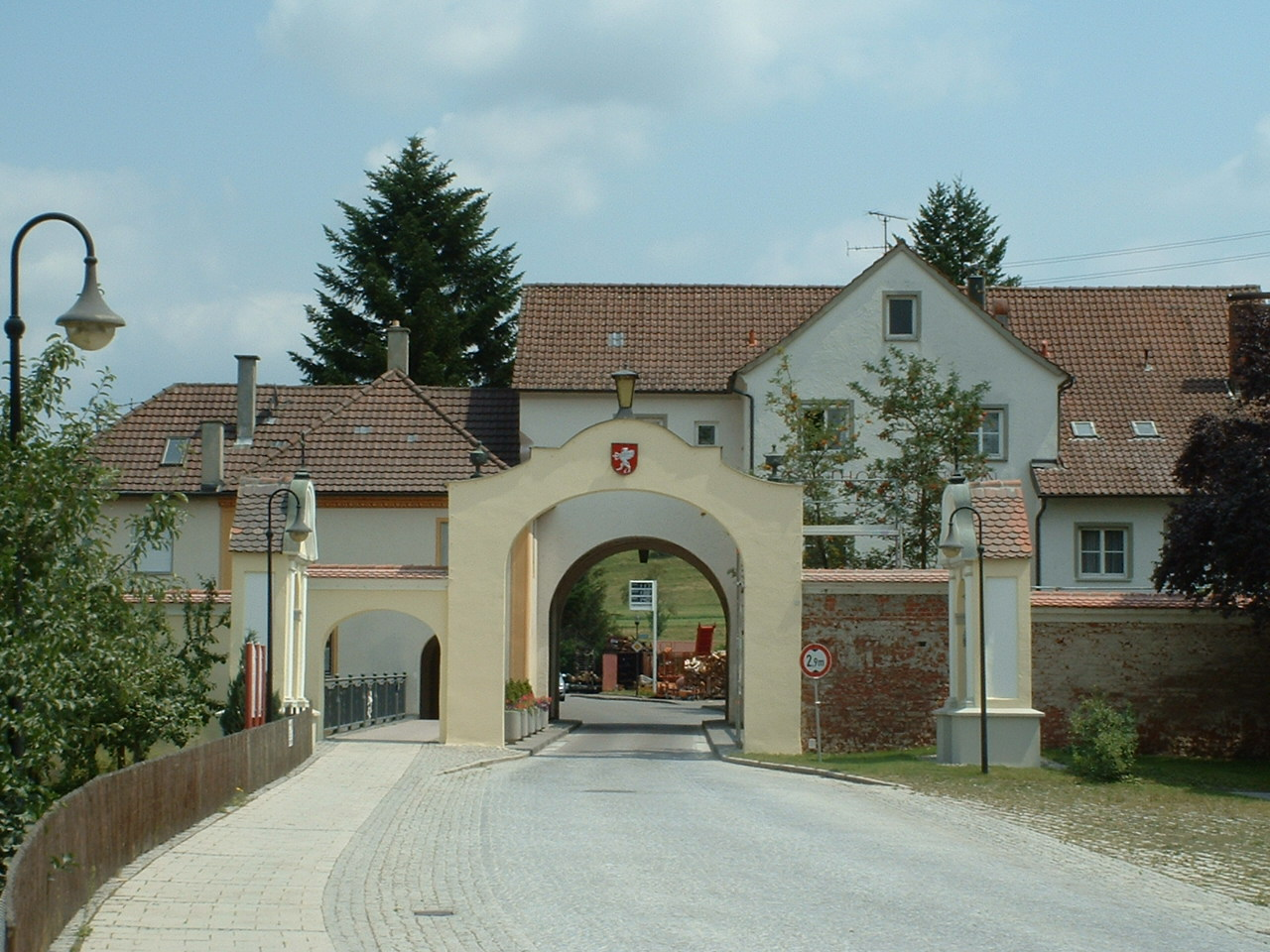
Lower Gate

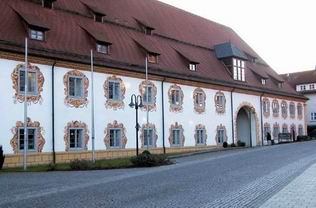
The economy building of Rot an der Rot Abbey

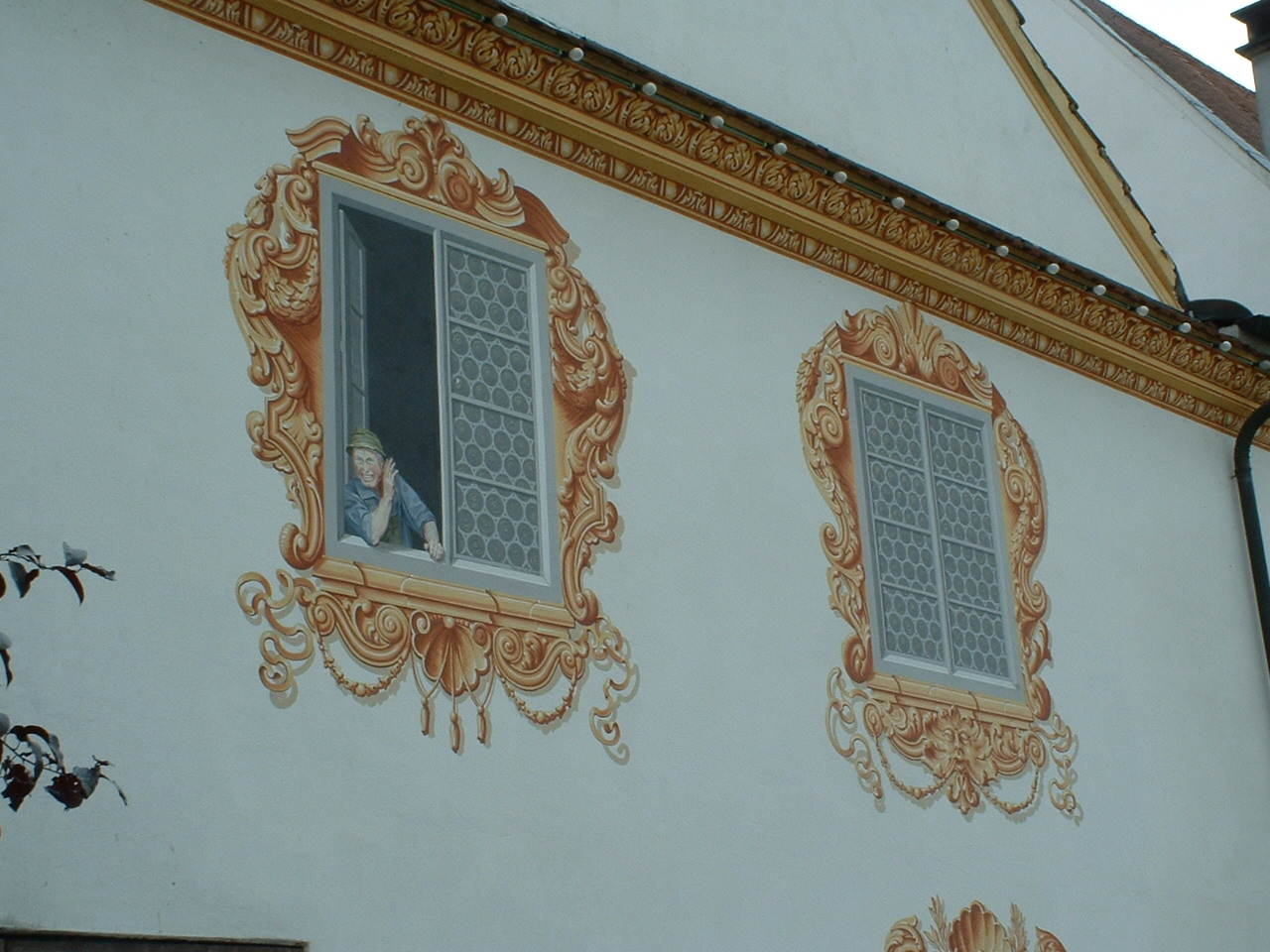
Mural on the economy building

== See also ==
- Imperial abbey
- Premonstratensian
- Upper Swabia
