= Sendener Bach =

River in Germany

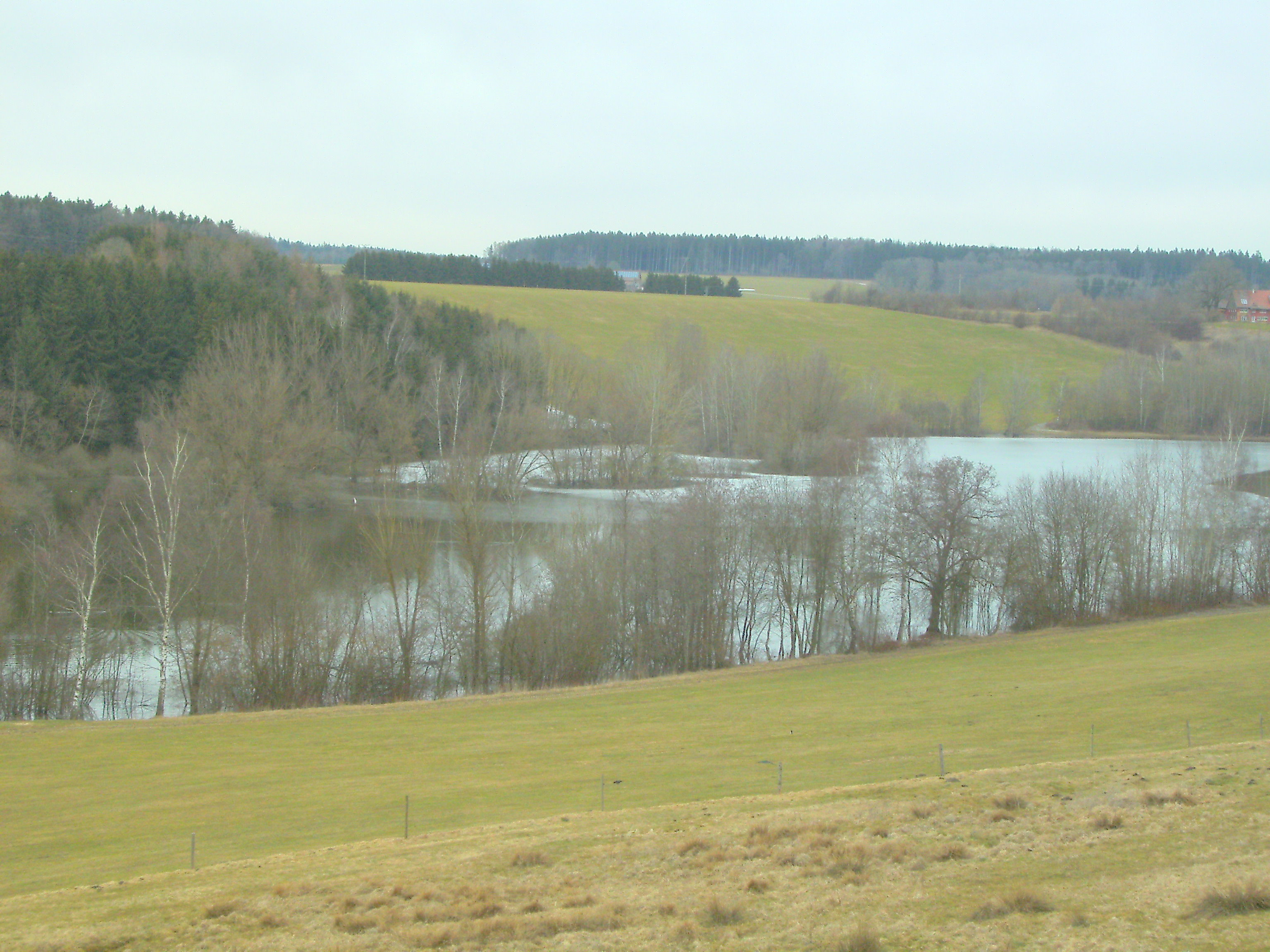

Location
- Country: Germany
- State: Baden-Württemberg

Physical characteristics
- Mouth
  - location: Pfaffenrieder Bach
  - coordinates: 47°58′38″N 9°59′07″E

Basin features
- Progression: Pfaffenrieder Bach→ Rot→ Danube→ Black Sea

Sendener Bach is a small southern tributary of the Pfaffenrieder Bach, located in southeastern Baden-Württemberg, Germany. It flows through the town of Bad Wurzach in the Ravensburg district, eventually passing near Konradsweiler in the Spindelwag district of the Rot an der Rot community in the Biberach district. The waterway is known as the Marienauer Bächle for the first third of its route.

== Course ==
The Marienauer Bächle starts at the Charterhouse of Marienau and flows steadily northwards. It first passes through a forested area, briefly extending into the municipal area of Aitrach on the right bank, and then continues through open terrain to the L 314 Baierz-Treherz.

Flowing northward through Hauerz, Sendener Bach forms the border on the right with the Spindelwag district of Rot an der Rot. Eventually, the stream flows into the Pfaffenrieder Bach near the village of Konradsweiler after covering a distance of 9.1 kilometers. The Pfaffenrieder Bach is not much longer than Sendener Bach up to this point.

== Story ==
In 1665, the princely family of Waldburg-Zeil built a large bathing facility near a healing spring in Hauerz. Noblemen used the healing water for medical treatment and entertainment. Ten years later, in 1675, the Wurzach line of the house of Waldburg acquired the bathing facility. This bathing facility was near the present-day Gasthof zum Adler, close to the Badelinde. There has never been a reliable chemical analysis of the healing water.

== See also ==
- List of rivers of Baden-Württemberg
