= Ellbach =

Ellbach may refer to:

- Ellbach (Kocher), a river of Baden-Württemberg, Germany, tributary of the Kocher
- Ellbach (Sulm), a river of Baden-Württemberg, Germany, tributary of the Sulm
- Ellbach (Rot), a river of Baden-Württemberg, Germany, headstream of the Rot
- Ellbach (Saar), a river of Saarland, Germany, tributary of the Saar
- Ellbach (Isar), a river of Bavaria, tributary of the Isar in Bad Tölz
- Ellbach (Brandenberger Ache), a river of the Kufstein District, Austria, tributary of the Brandenberger Ache

== See also ==
- Elbach, a commune in Alsace, France
- Elbbach, a river in Rhineland-Palatinate and Hesse, Germany
