= Schmiddis =

River in Germany

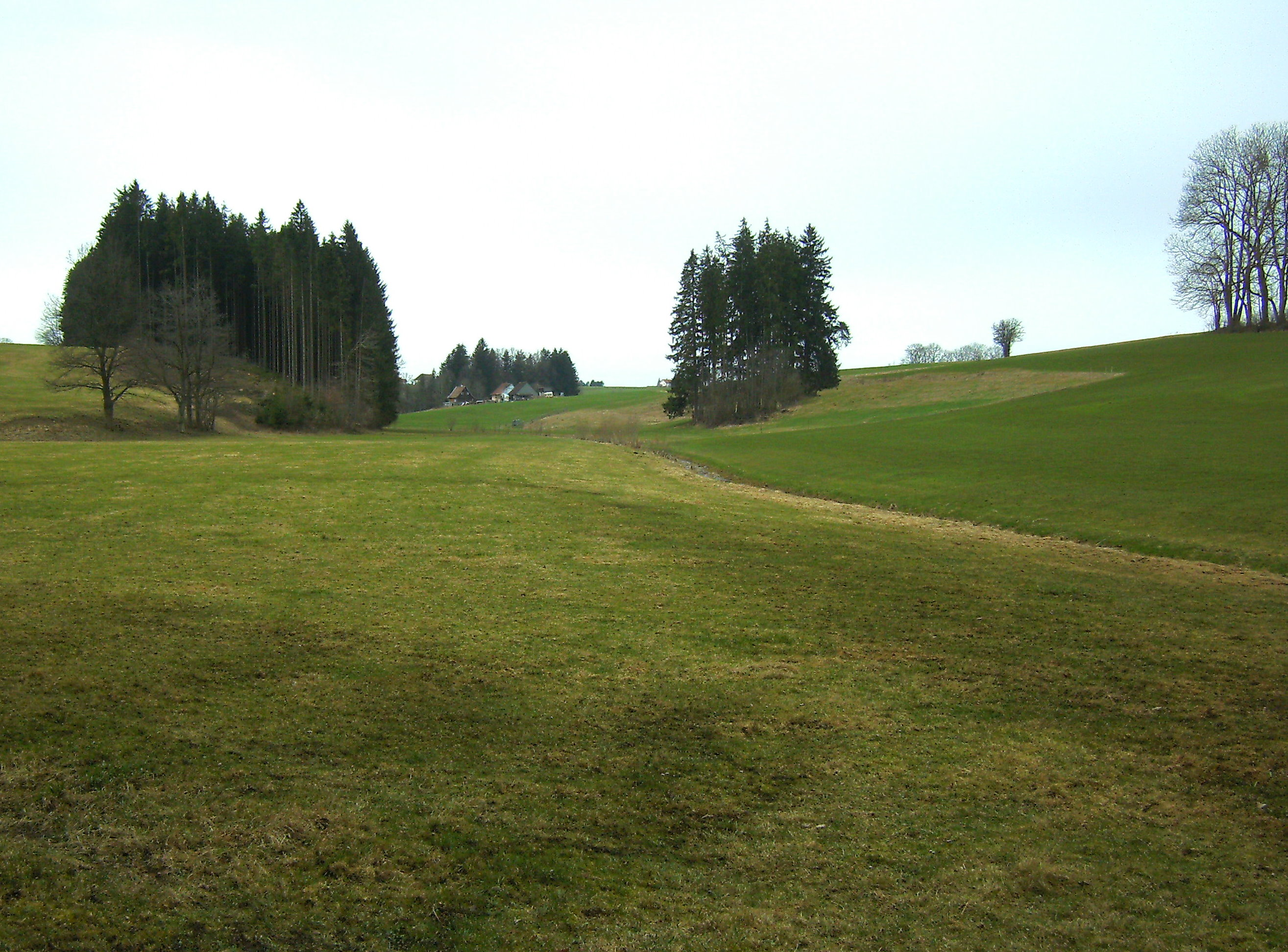
- Area of the river source

Location
- Country: Germany
- State: Baden Württemberg

Physical characteristics
- Source
  - location: in Schmiddis
  - elevation: 655 m (2,149 ft)
- Mouth
  - location: Haslach
  - coordinates: 47°57′15″N 10°03′19″E
  - elevation: 645 m (2,116 ft)
- Length: 7.0 km (4.3 mi)

Basin features
- Progression: Haslach→ Rot→ Danube→ Black Sea

The Schmiddis (also: Schmiddisbach) is one of the headstreams of the river Haslach. It is situated in the region of Upper Swabia in Baden Württemberg, Germany.

== Geography ==
The Schmiddis is a small stream which has its source in the hamlet of Schmiddis near Treherz, part of the municipality of Aitrach in the district of Ravensburg. It runs in a northerly direction for 3 kilometres, It joins the Rappenbach at the retention basin Rappenbach, forming the river Haslach.

Two bridges cross the Schmiddis, one for the state road 314, and a second one close to the mouth of the stream near the retention basin Rappenbach.

== See also ==
- List of rivers of Baden-Württemberg
