= Haslach (Rot) =

River in Germany

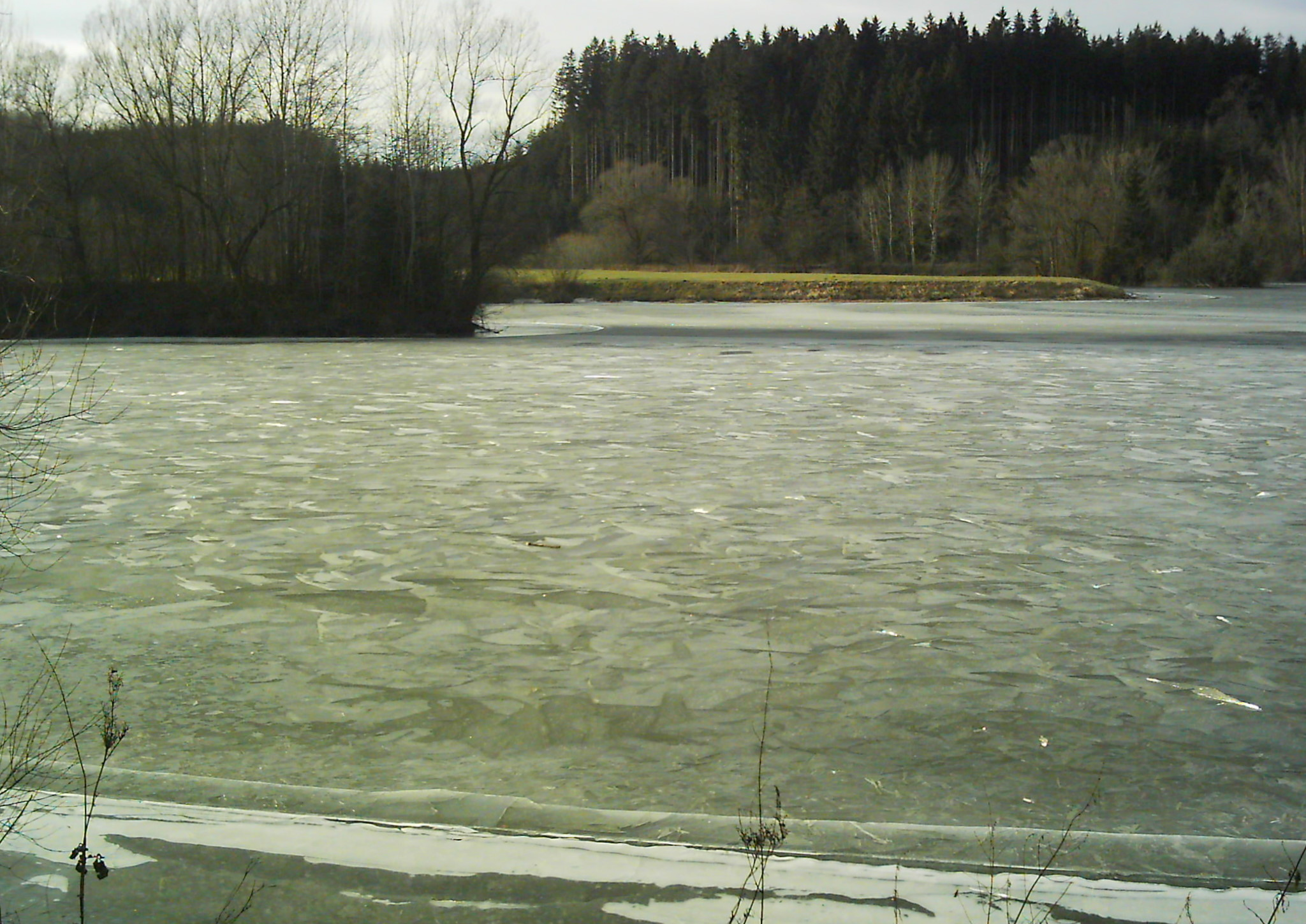

Location
- Country: Germany

Physical characteristics
- Source
  - location: near Haslach
  - coordinates: 48°01′14″N 10°01′58″E
  - elevation: 645 m (2,116 ft)
- Mouth
  - location: Rot
  - coordinates: 47°57′38″N 10°03′29″E
  - elevation: 600 m (2,000 ft)
- Length: 5.5 km (3.4 mi)

Basin features
- Progression: Rot→ Danube→ Black Sea

The Haslach (German pronunciation: [ˈhaslax]) is a small river in the region of Upper Swabia in Baden Württemberg in Germany. It is an eastern tributary to the river Rot and has a length of 5.5 km.

== Geography ==
The source of the river Haslach is to the southeast of Haslach in the district of Ravensburg on the territory of the municipalities of Aitrach and Bad Wurzach. The rivulets Schmiddis and Rappenbach flow into the retention basin Rappenbach, forming the river Haslach. The river Haslach then runs into a northerly directions. One kilometre to the south of Rot an der Rot another stream, the Roteisbach, joins the Haslach.

After 5.5 km the Haslach empties its waters into the river Rot between Rot an der Rot and Zell near Rot an der Rot Abbey.

== History ==
On 17 August 1969 heavy thunderstorms and torrential rain of a kind rare in Upper Swabia resulted in a dangerous rise of the water level in an outdated retention basin. When the waters flooded the dam crest, the dam, which was 8 metres high, collapsed at a length of 50 metres, resulting in a flood wave that swept large quantities of scree, boulders, wood and uprooted trees onto roads, thoroughfares and rivers rendering them impassable. Fire brigades and members of the Federal Agency for Technical Relief from all over Baden-Württemberg came to the rescue and helped clearing the affected areas from debris.

== See also ==
- List of rivers of Baden-Württemberg
