= Ellbach (Rot) =

River in Germany

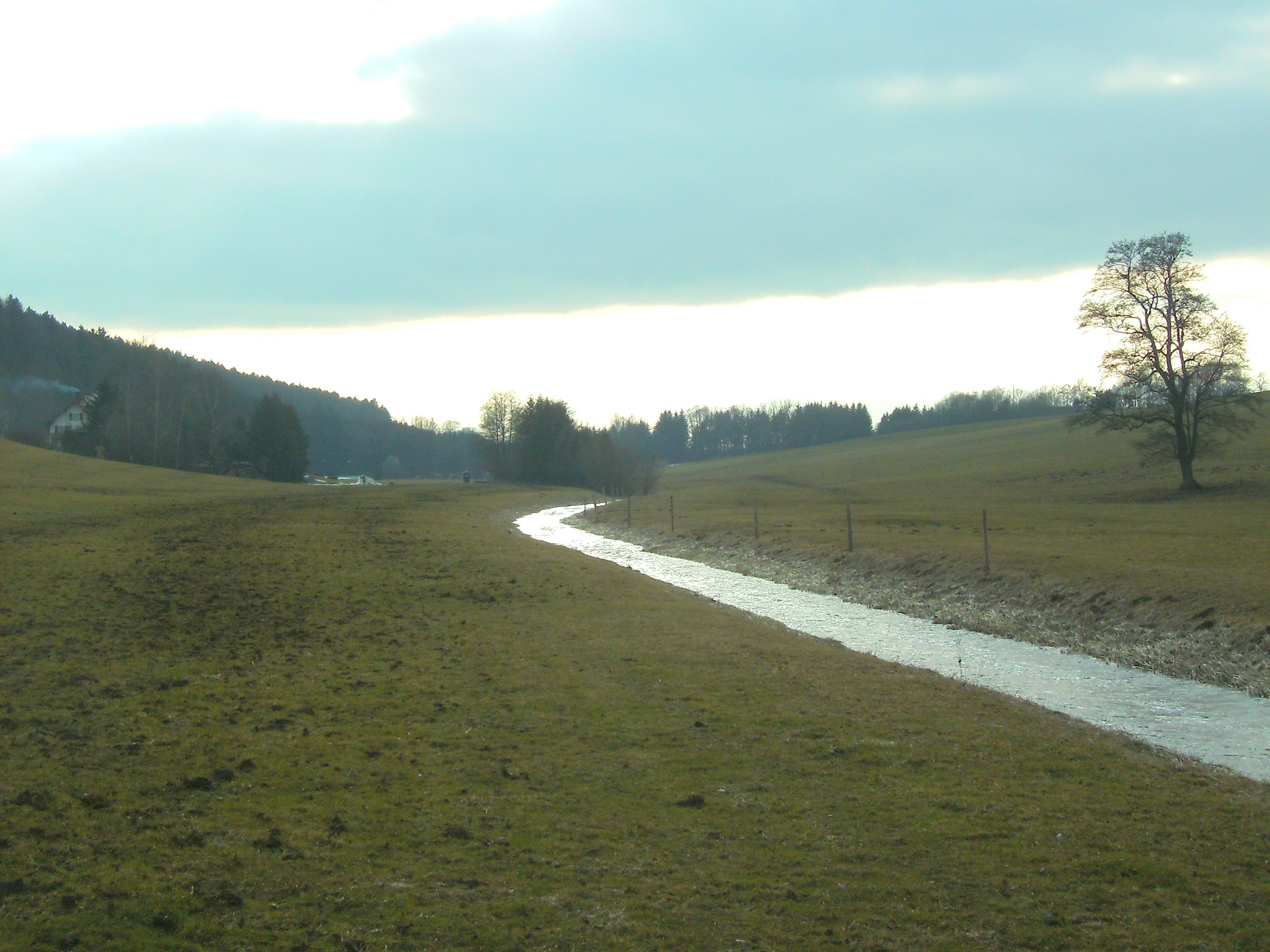

Location
- Country: Germany
- State: Baden-Württemberg

Physical characteristics
- Mouth
  - location: Rot
  - coordinates: 47.9976°N 10.0008°E

Basin features
- Progression: Rot→ Danube→ Black Sea

Ellbach is a river of Baden-Württemberg, Germany. It is a right headstream of the Rot southwest of Rot an der Rot.

== See also ==
- List of rivers of Baden-Württemberg
