= Imperial immediacy =

Constitutional status in the Holy Roman Empire

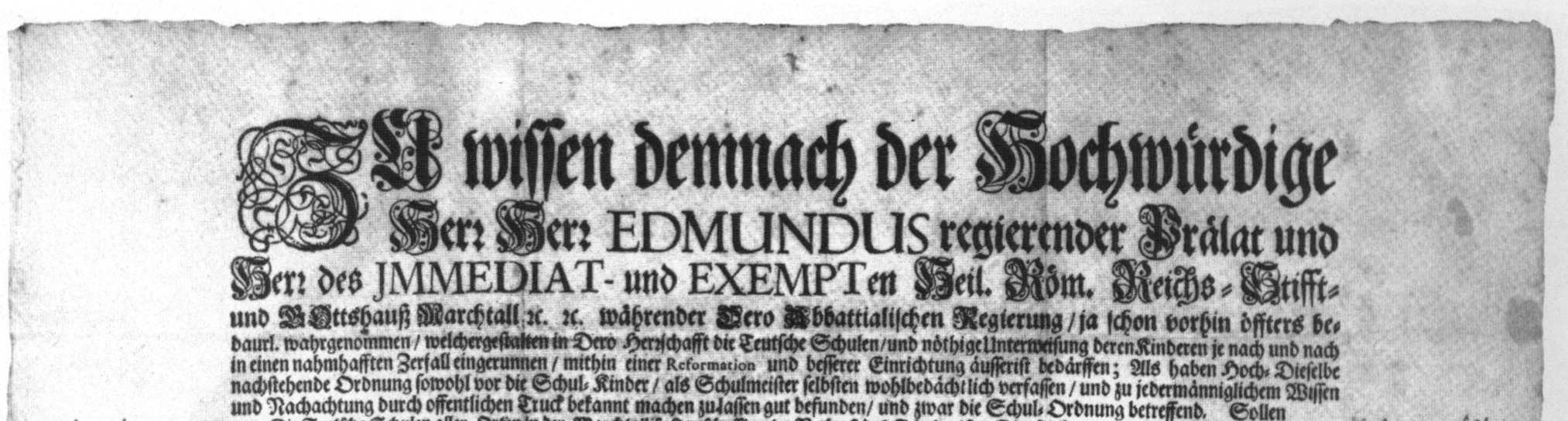
Document signed by the Abbot of Marchtal, "immediate and exempt"

In the Holy Roman Empire, imperial immediacy (German: Reichsunmittelbarkeit or Reichsfreiheit) was the status of an individual or a territory which was defined as 'immediate' (unmittelbar) to Emperor and Empire (Kaiser und Reich) and not to any other intermediate authorities, while one that did not possess that status was defined as 'mediate' (mittelbar).

The possession of this imperial immediacy granted a constitutionally unique form of territorial authority known as "territorial superiority" (Landeshoheit) which had nearly all the attributes of sovereignty, but fell short of true sovereignty since the rulers of the Empire remained at least nominally answerable to the Empire's institutions and basic laws. In the early modern period, the Empire consisted of over 1,800 immediate territories, ranging in size from quite large such as Austria, Bavaria, Saxony, and Brandenburg, down to the several hundred tiny immediate estates of the Imperial Knights of only a few square kilometers or less, which were by far the most numerous.

== Acquisition ==
The criteria of immediacy varied and classification is difficult, especially for the Middle Ages. The situation was relatively clear in the case of the cities: imperial cities were directly subject to the emperor's jurisdiction and taxation, and a first list can be found in the imperial tax register of 1241. In the case of the nobility, the enfeoffment with an imperial fief and high aristocratic lineage was regarded as decisive criteria for immediacy. However, towards the end of the Middle Ages, the counts were generally considered to be immediate to the Empire, although they often had obtained their fiefs from neighboring princes. The imperial immediacy of bishops was acquired automatically when they were enfeoffed with their Hochstift (prince-bishopric) and granted immunities. The situation for the prelates (abbots) was not always clear since there were some who, although recognized as immediate, had not been enfeoffed directly by the king. In the end, for the Middle Ages, the formal grant of immediacy was of relative importance; the decisive factor was the capacity to assert and enforce one's claim to immediacy against competing claims.

The position of the princes with regard to the crown had strengthened progressively since the reign of Frederick Barbarossa (1152–1190) who restricted the immediate crown vassalage to the archbishops, bishops and imperial abbots, roughly ninety of them, and to distinguish most dukes and a selection of reliable margraves, landgraves and counts as maiores imperii principes ("greater princes of the empire"). They were intended to be the only direct vassals, apart from the Imperial ministeriales who did homage within the royal household, and the royal towns which offered collective fealty. From the thirteenth century onward, the growing exclusiveness of the princes derived from their determination to enforce their preeminence and make the other lords feudally dependent on themselves, and to incorporate them into their own territorial lordships, thus making them 'mediate' by cutting them off from direct legal relationship with the crown.

During the High Middle Ages, and for those bishops, abbots, and cities then the main beneficiaries of that status, immediacy could be exacting and often meant subjection to the fiscal, military, and hospitality demands of their overlord, the Emperor. However, from the mid-13th century onwards, with the gradually diminishing importance of the Emperor, whose authority to exercise power became increasingly limited to the enforcement of legislative acts promulgated by the Imperial Diet, entities privileged by imperial immediacy eventually found themselves vested with considerable rights and powers previously exercised by the emperor.

== Gradations ==
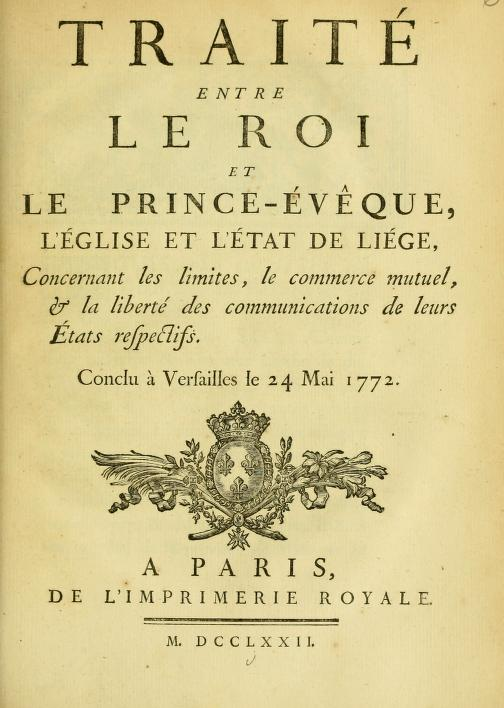
The Prince-Bishop of Liège, member of the Imperial estates, enjoyed Imperial immediacy and therefore could negotiate and sign international treaties on his own, as long as they were not directed against the Emperor and the Empire.

Several immediate estates held the privilege of attending meetings of the Imperial diet in person, including an individual vote (votum virile):

- the seven prince-electors designated by the Golden Bull of 1356
- the other princes of the Holy Roman Empire
  - secular: dukes, margraves, landgraves, etc.
  - ecclesiastical: prince-bishops, prince-abbots and prince-provosts.

They formed the Imperial estates, together with 99 immediate counts, 40 Imperial prelates (abbots and abbesses), and 50 Imperial cities, each of whose "banks" only enjoyed a single collective vote (votum curiatum).

Further immediate estates not represented in the Imperial diet were the Imperial Knights as well as several abbeys and minor localities, the remains of those territories which in the High Middle Ages had been under the direct authority of the Emperor and since then had mostly been given in pledge to the princes.

At the same time, there were classes of "princes" with titular immediacy to the Emperor which they exercised rarely, if at all. For example, the Bishops of Chiemsee, Gurk, and Seckau (Sacken) were practically subordinate to the prince-archbishop of Salzburg, but were formally princes of the Empire.

== Advantages and disadvantages ==
Additional advantages might include the rights to collect taxes and tolls, to hold a market, to mint coins, to bear arms, and to conduct legal proceedings. The last of these might include the so-called Blutgericht ("blood court") through which capital punishment could be administered. These rights varied according to the legal patents granted by the emperor.

As pointed out by Jonathan Israel, the Dutch province of Overijssel in 1528 tried to arrange its submission to Emperor Charles V (who was also King of Spain) in his capacity as Holy Roman Emperor rather than as Duke of Burgundy. If successful, that would have evoked Imperial immediacy and would have put Overijssel in a stronger negotiating position, for example giving the province the ability to appeal to the Imperial Diet in any debate with Charles. For that reason, the Emperor strongly rejected and blocked Overijssel's attempt.

Disadvantages might include direct intervention by imperial commissions, as happened in several of the southwestern cities after the Schmalkaldic War, and the potential restriction or outright loss of previously held legal patents. Immediate rights might be lost if the Emperor and/or the Imperial Diet could not defend them against external aggression, as occurred in the French Revolutionary wars and the Napoleonic Wars. The Treaty of Lunéville in 1801 required the emperor to renounce all claims to the portions of the Holy Roman Empire west of the Rhine. At the last meeting of the Imperial Diet (German: Reichsdeputationshauptschluss) in 1802–03, also called the German mediatisation, most of the free imperial cities and the ecclesiastic states lost their imperial immediacy and were absorbed by several dynastic states.

== See also ==
- Autonomous administrative division
- List of states of the Holy Roman Empire
- Tenant-in-chief
