= Marchtal Abbey =

Monastery in Alb-Donau-Kreis, Baden-Württemberg, Germany

Coordinates: 48°14′11″N 9°34′15″E

Imperial Abbey of Marchtal Reichsstift Marchtal
- 1500–1803
- Coat of arms

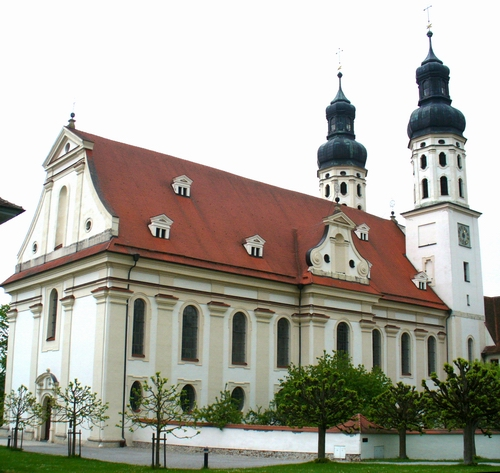
- Minster church, Marchtal Abbey
- Status: Imperial Abbey
- Capital: Marchtal Abbey
- Government: Elective principality
- Historical era: Middle Ages; early modern period
  - Monastery founded by Ahalolfinger: before 776
  - Dedicated by Herman II, Duke of Swabia: 993 1500
  - Refounded by Hugo II, Count Palatine of Tübingen: 1171
  - Rededicated by Henry I, Bishop of Constance: 2 May 1239
  - Raised to abbey: 1440
  - Raised to Imperial abbey: 1500
  - Secularised to Thurn und Taxis: 1803
  - Mediatised to Württemberg: 1806
Preceded by	Succeeded by
Duchy of Württemberg	House of Thurn und Taxis
- Today part of: Germany

Marchtal Abbey (German: Kloster Marchtal or Reichsstift Marchtal) is a former Premonstratensian monastery in Obermarchtal in the Alb-Donau-Kreis, Baden-Württemberg, Germany. The minster church of Saints Peter and Paul, the former abbey church, located on a prominent elevation, still dominates the landscape for miles around.

== History ==
=== First foundation ===
In 776 the noble clan of the Ahalolfinger made a gift of the monastery founded by their ancestor Halaholf and his wife to St Gall's Abbey. By 993 the monastery had become a collegiate foundation of canons dedicated by Herman II, Duke of Swabia, and his wife Gerberga to the apostles Peter and Paul.

During the 12th century the monastery passed through the possession of a series of Swabian nobles, including the Staufen and particularly Frederick I, Holy Roman Emperor. These constant changes of proprietor caused a severe decline in the monastery.

=== Second foundation ===
In 1171 the monastery was refounded by Pfalzgraf Hugo II of Tübingen as a Premonstratensian double abbey for men and women and given an adequate endowment. The canons were brought from Mönchsrot Abbey in Rot an der Rot. The existing premises were extensive and large-scale construction was not immediately necessary.

The first prior of the new foundation was Eberhard von Wolfegg from Mönchsrot Abbey. Between 1204-1208 Prior Meinhardt had the walls rebuilt. Prior Walther II had the old church extended to a three-aisled basilica, which was dedicated on 2 May 1239 by Henry I, Bishop of Constance.

In 1273 Prior Konrad (1226–75) forbade any more admissions to women, and the double monastery soon became one for men only.

Under Prior Heinrich Mörstetter (1436–61) Marchtal was raised to the status of an abbey, in 1440. In 1500 it was made an Imperial abbey, with a place and vote in the Reichstag. In 1609 the abbot received the right to bear the pontificalia (mitre, ring and pectoral cross). At this period more than 20 places and estates belonged to the territory of the abbey, besides houses in the towns of Reutlingen, Ehingen, Munderkingen and Riedlingen.

The Thirty Years' War caused much distress in the southwest of Germany. In 1632 the canons had to flee from the Swedes. The buildings survived the war, but in a very dilapidated state. It was left to the 15th abbot, the young Nikolaus Magnus Wierith, to undertake the restorations. Planning for the construction of the new church began in 1674; the first stone was laid in 1686, and the dedication took place in 1701. During this period the monk Isfrid Kayser (1712-1771) became known for his compositions.

The abbey was dissolved in 1803 during the secularisation following upon the Reichsdeputationshauptschluss, and with its territories became the possession of the Princes of Thurn und Taxis, who administered it as part of the Principality of Buchau.

In 1806 the former abbey was mediatised by the Kingdom of Württemberg. The abbey church became the parish church and the monastery became a "castle" (Schloss) or country house.

=== Salesian Sisters ===
In 1919 a group of sisters of the Order of the Visitation of Holy Mary, also sometimes known as "Salesian sisters", from Chotieschau Abbey in Bohemia (now Chotěšov Abbey, Czech Republic) were given accommodation in the north wing. The sisters ran a secondary school for girls here until 1992, when it was taken over by the "Stiftung Katholische Schule der Diözese Rottenburg-Stuttgart". The convent moved in 1997 to Untermarchtal.

In 1973 the diocese of Rottenburg-Stuttgart bought the entire monastic complex from the Princes Thurn und Taxis, and converted it into a teacher training academy, opened on 8 September 1978. On 16 September 2001, to mark the 300th anniversary of the dedication of the church, Bishop Gebhard Fürst raised the abbey church to the rank of a minster church.

== Images ==
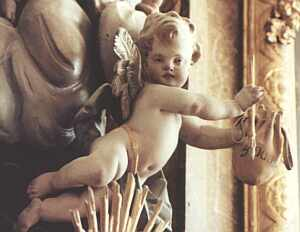
Putto in the minster church

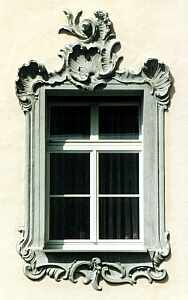
Rococo window frame, abbey

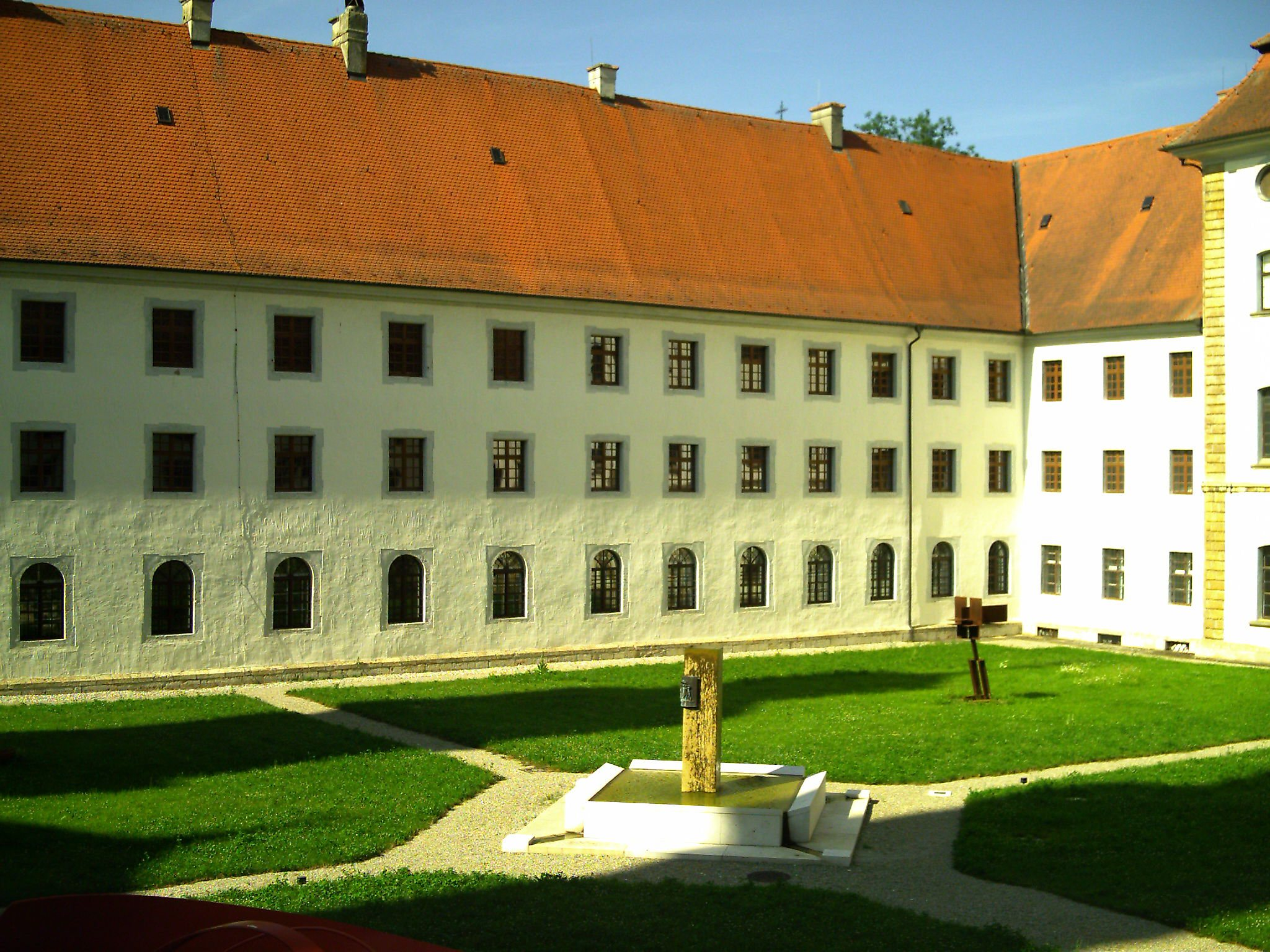
Inner courtyard

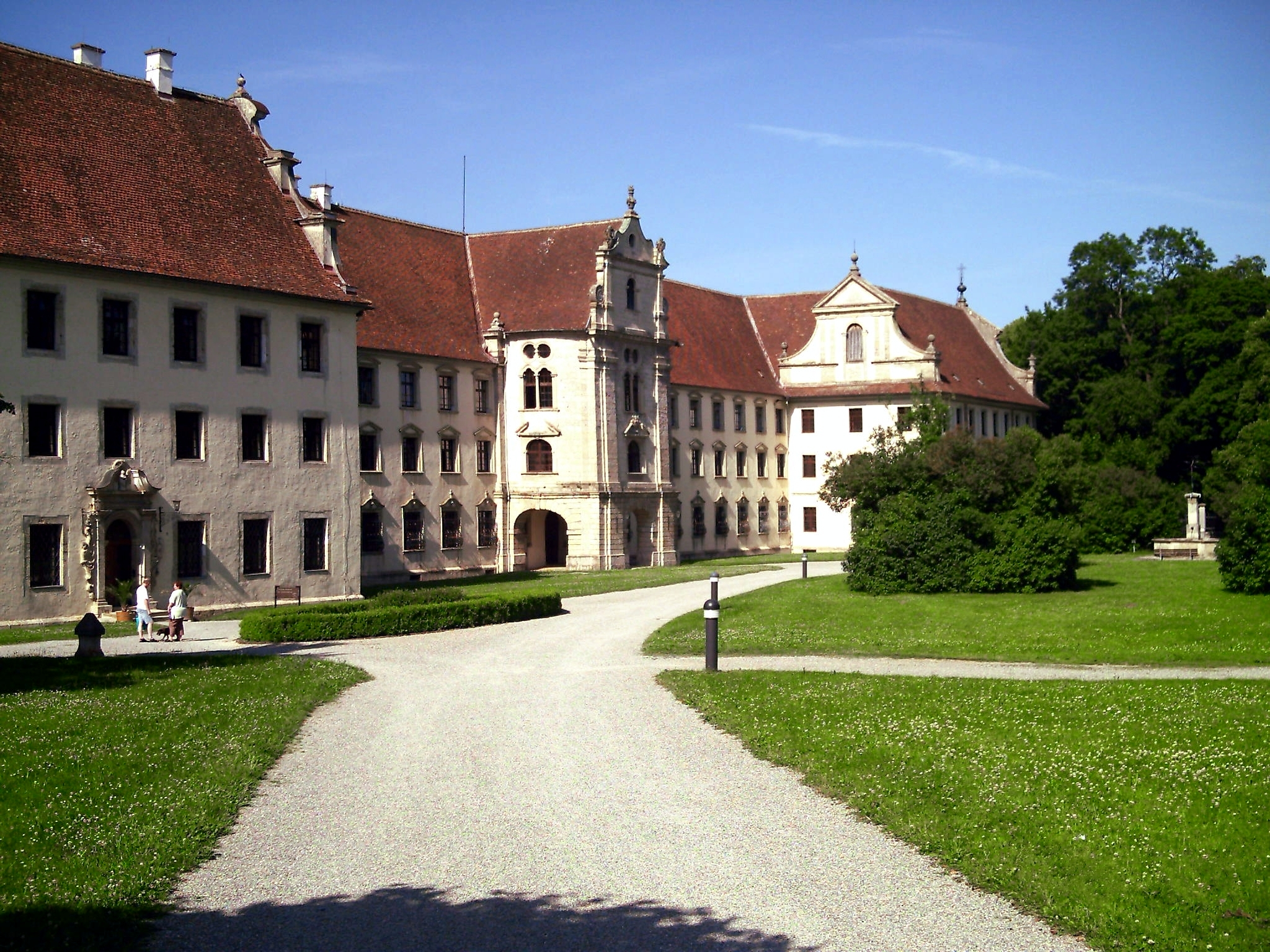
External view

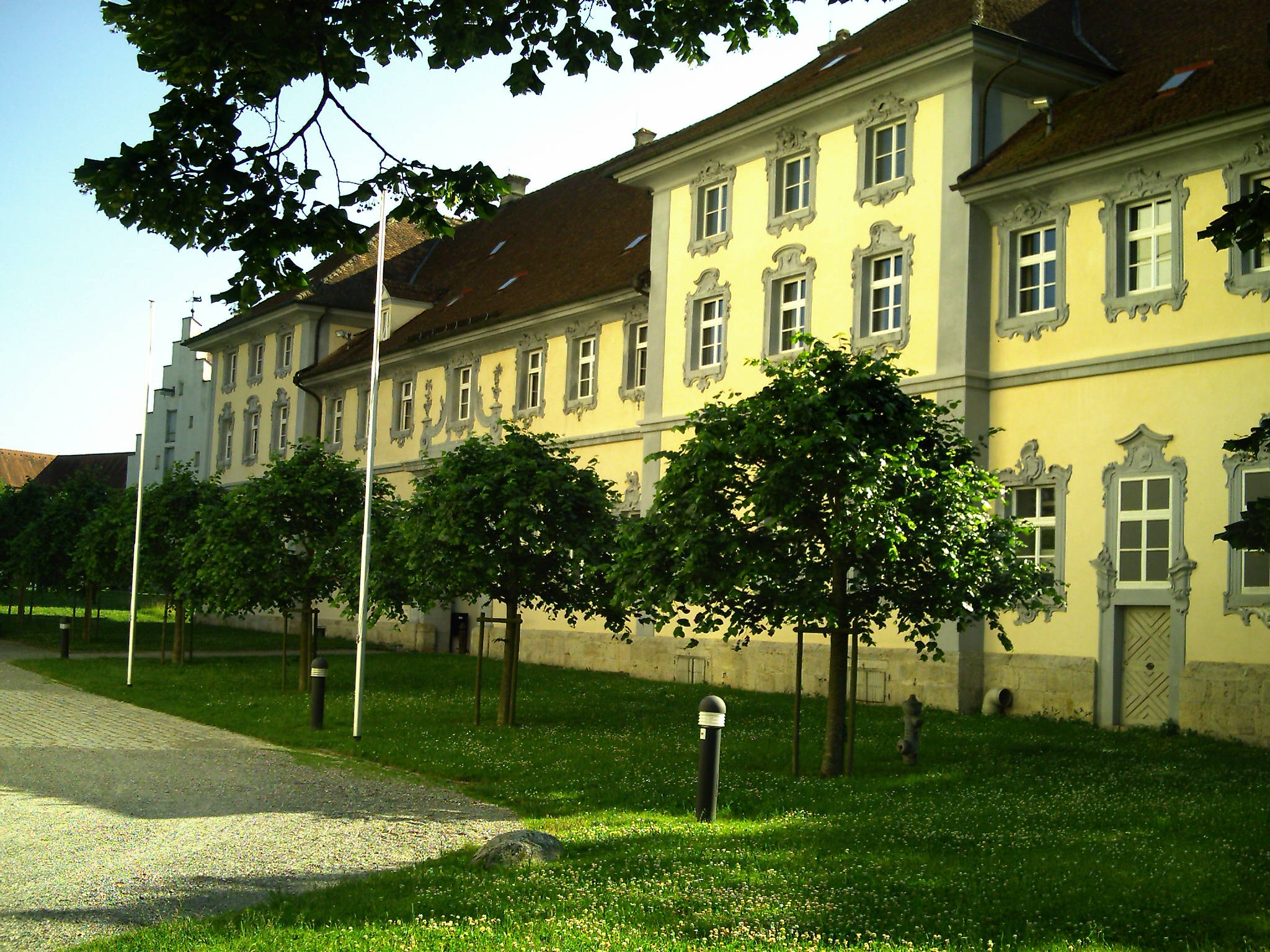
Sebastian Sailer Building

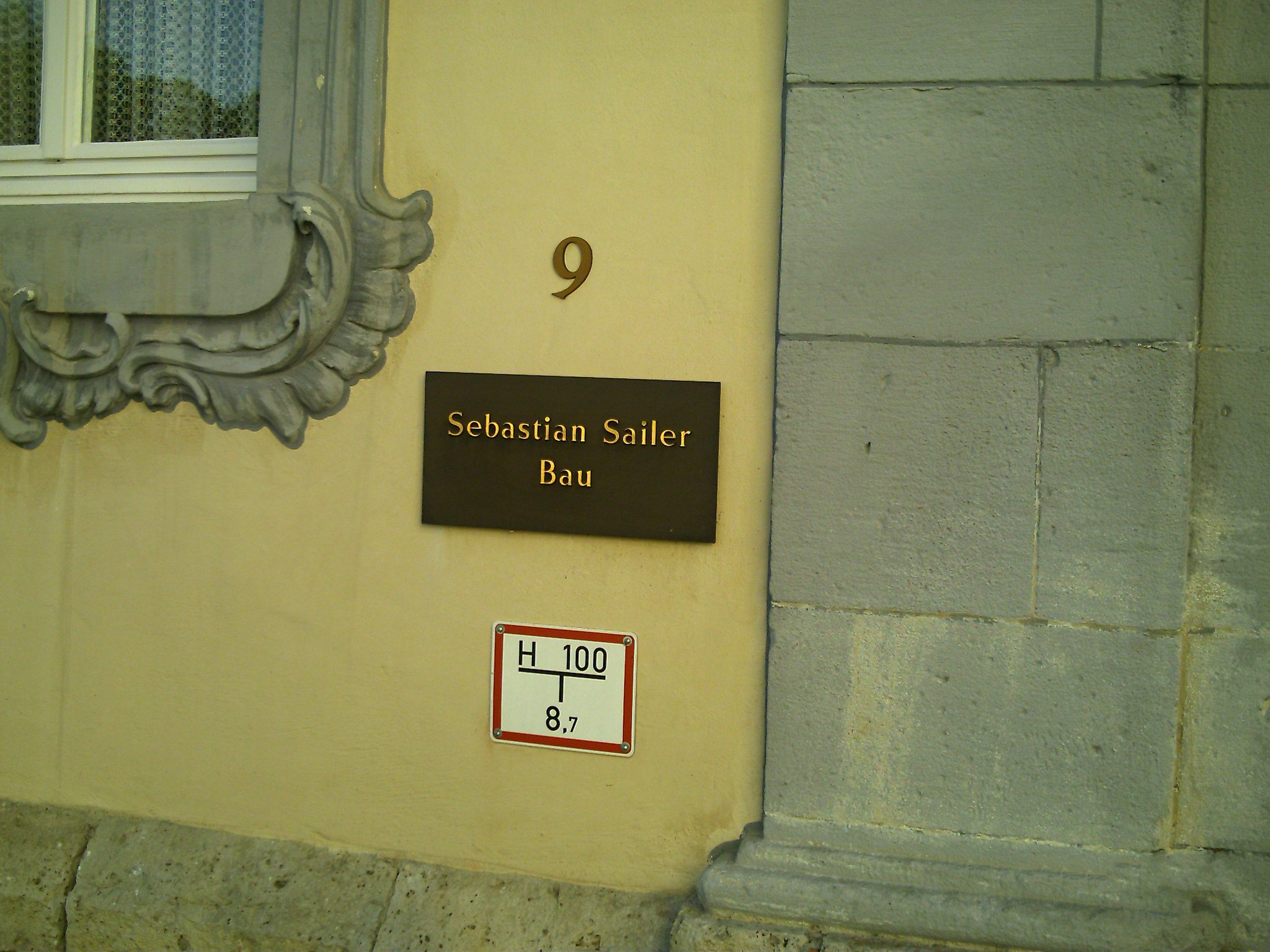
Sebastian Sailer Building (plaque)

== Sources ==
- Max Müller, Rudolf Reinhardt, Wilfried Schöntag (eds.), 1992: Marchtal. Prämonstratenserabtei, Fürstliches Schloß, Kirchliche Akademie. Festgabe zum 300jährigen Bestehen der Stiftskirche St. Peter und Paul (1692 bis 1992). Ulm.
