= Rot an der Rot =

- Municipality
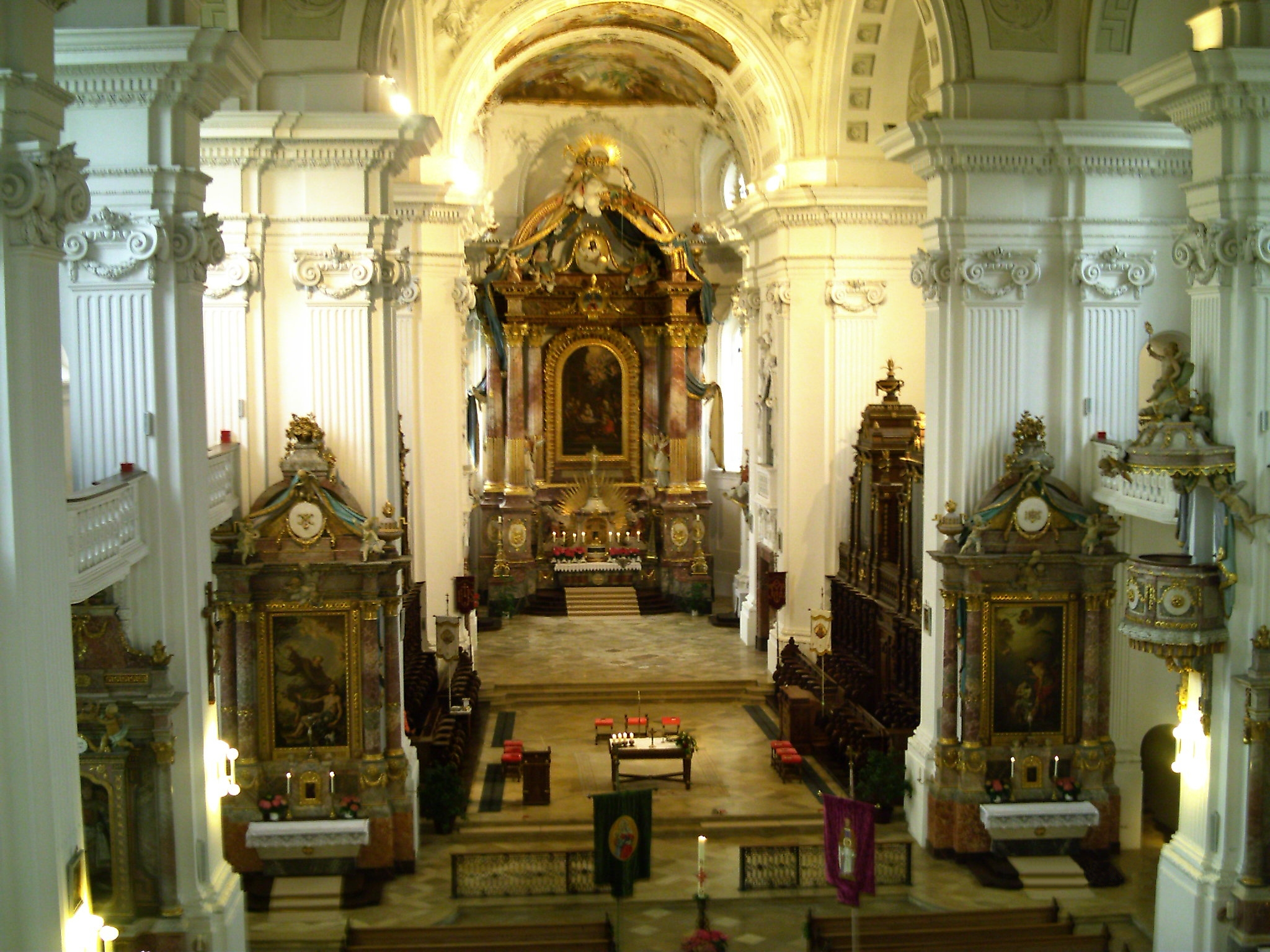
- St. Verena

- Coat of arms

- Location of Rot an der Rot within Biberach district
- Interactive map of Rot an der Rot
- Location within Germany Location within Baden-Württemberg
- Coordinates: 48°0′50″N 10°1′53″E
- Country: Germany
- State: Baden-Württemberg
- Admin. region: Tübingen
- District: Biberach
- Subdivisions: 2

Government
  - Mayor (2024–32): Andreas Maaß

Area
  - Total: 63.41 km^{2} (24.48 sq mi)
- Elevation: 605 m (1,985 ft)

Population (2025-12-31)
  - Total: 4,533
  - Density: 71.49/km^{2} (185.2/sq mi)
- Time zone: UTC+01:00 (CET)
  - Summer (DST): UTC+02:00 (CEST)
- Postal codes: 88430
- Dialling codes: 08395
- Vehicle registration: BC
- Website: www.rot.de

Rot an der Rot (German pronunciation: [ˈʁoːt ʔan deːɐ̯ ˈʁoːt], lit. 'Rot on the Rot') is a town in the district of Biberach in Baden-Württemberg in Germany. The town developed out of Rot an der Rot Abbey.

== Bilder ==
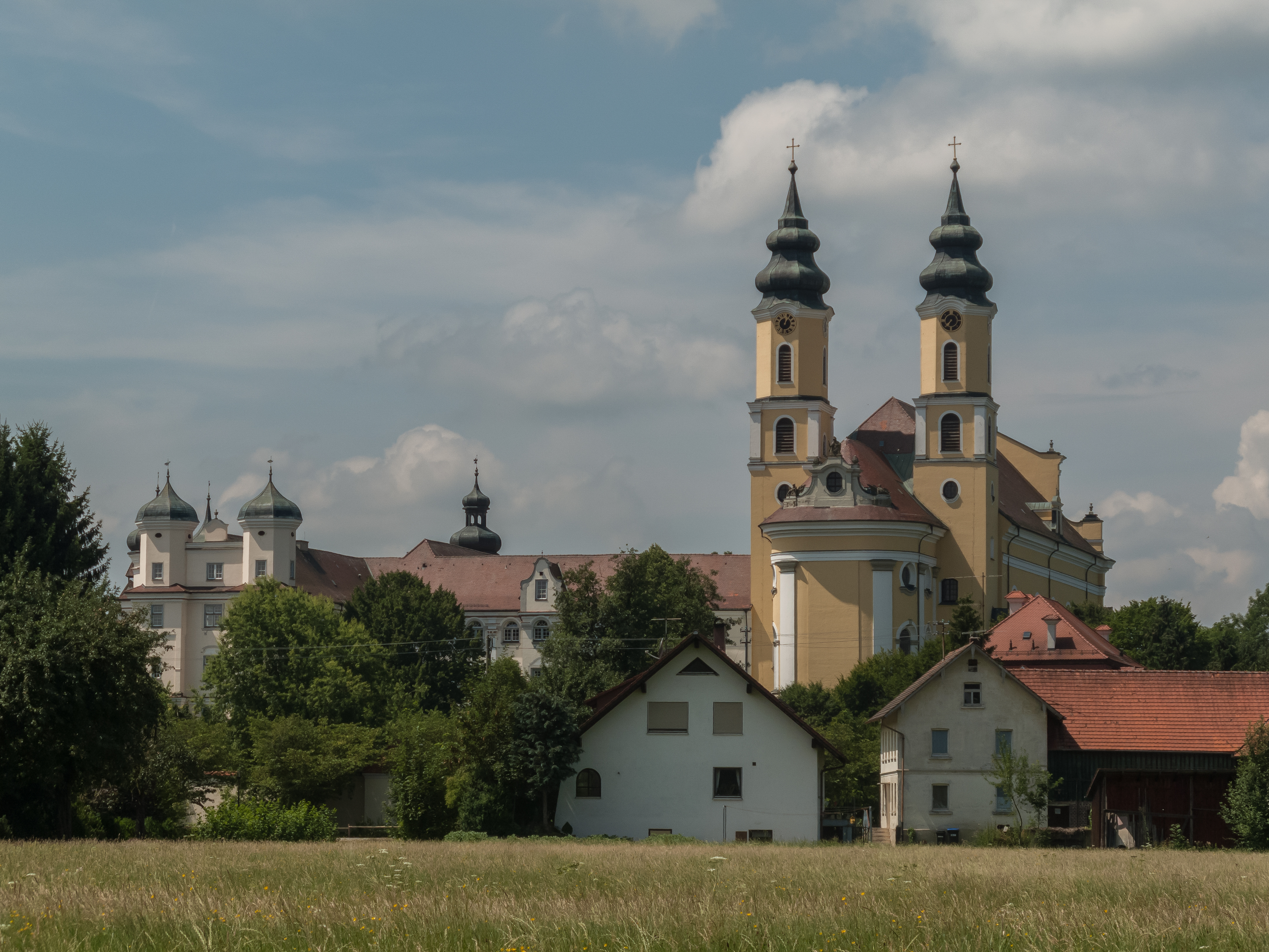
Church: Klosterkirche Sankt Verena und Maria

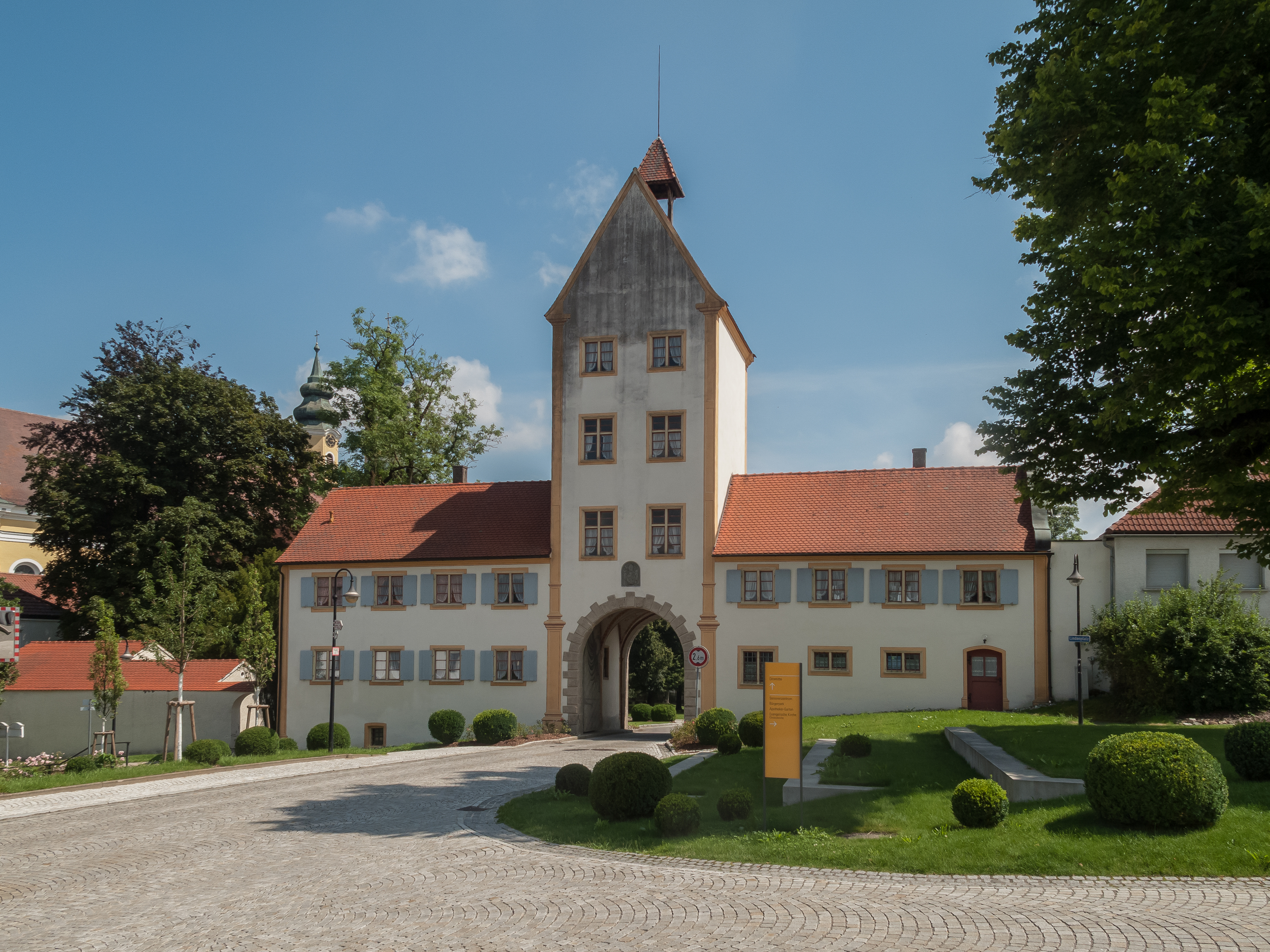
Gate: Oberes Tor

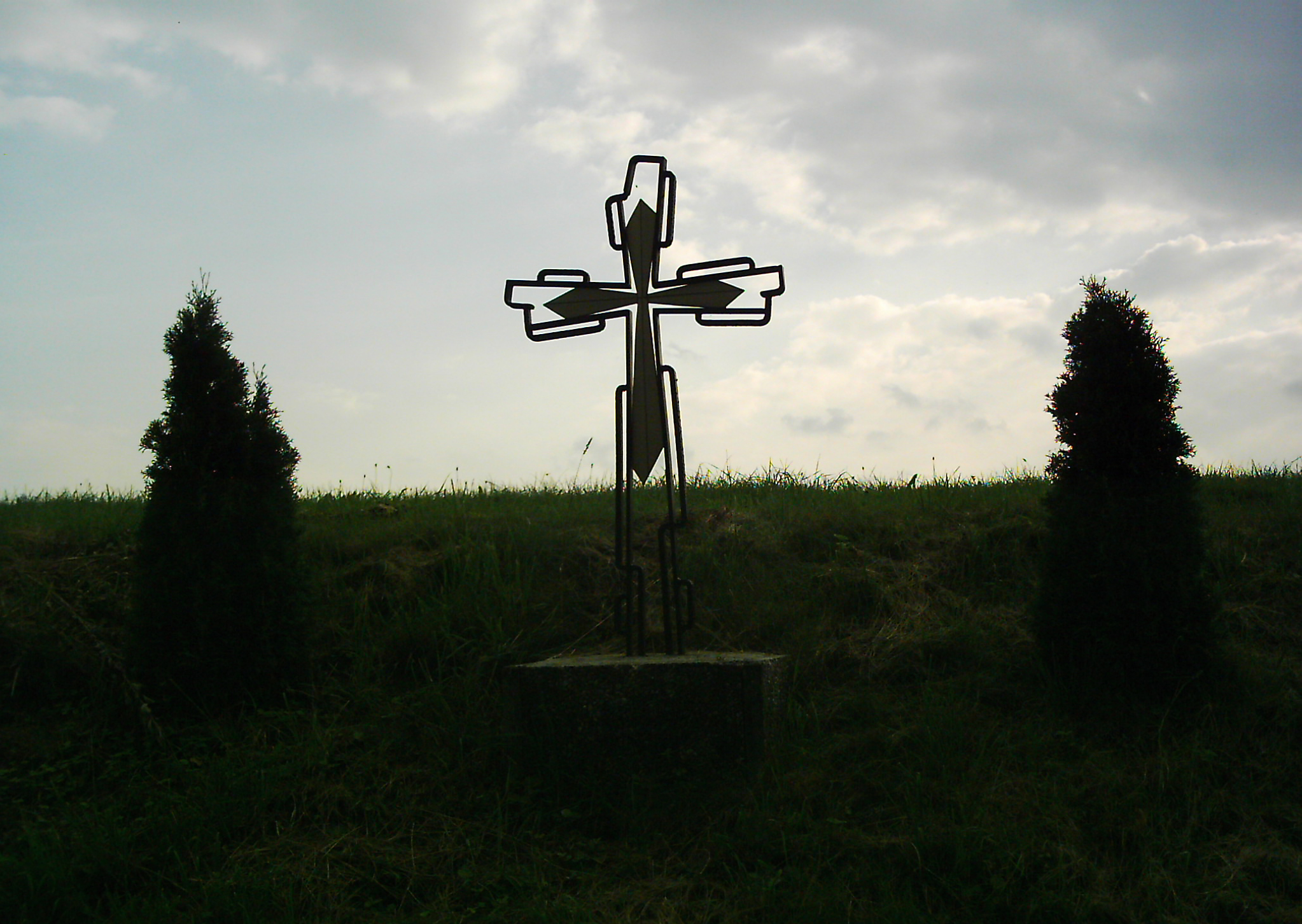
Wayside cross

== Notables ==
- Wilhelm Hanser (1738–1796), composer and organist
- Julius von Roeck (1818–1884) mayor of Memmingen
- HAP Grieshaber (1909–1981), painter and graphic artist
- Gerd Leipold (* 1951), former CEO of Greenpeace International

=== Other people associated with the city ===
- Wilhelm Eiselin (* 1564 in Mindelheim; † March 28, 1588 in Rot an der Rot), Premonstratensian
- Franz Baum (1927–2016), former member of parliament
- Siegfried Rundel (1940-2009), composer and publisher
- Frank Günther (* 1947), Shakespeare translator
- Berthold Schick (* 1966), musician, lives in Rot an der Rot
- Holger Badstuber (* 1989), football player
