= Rot (Danube) =

River in Germany

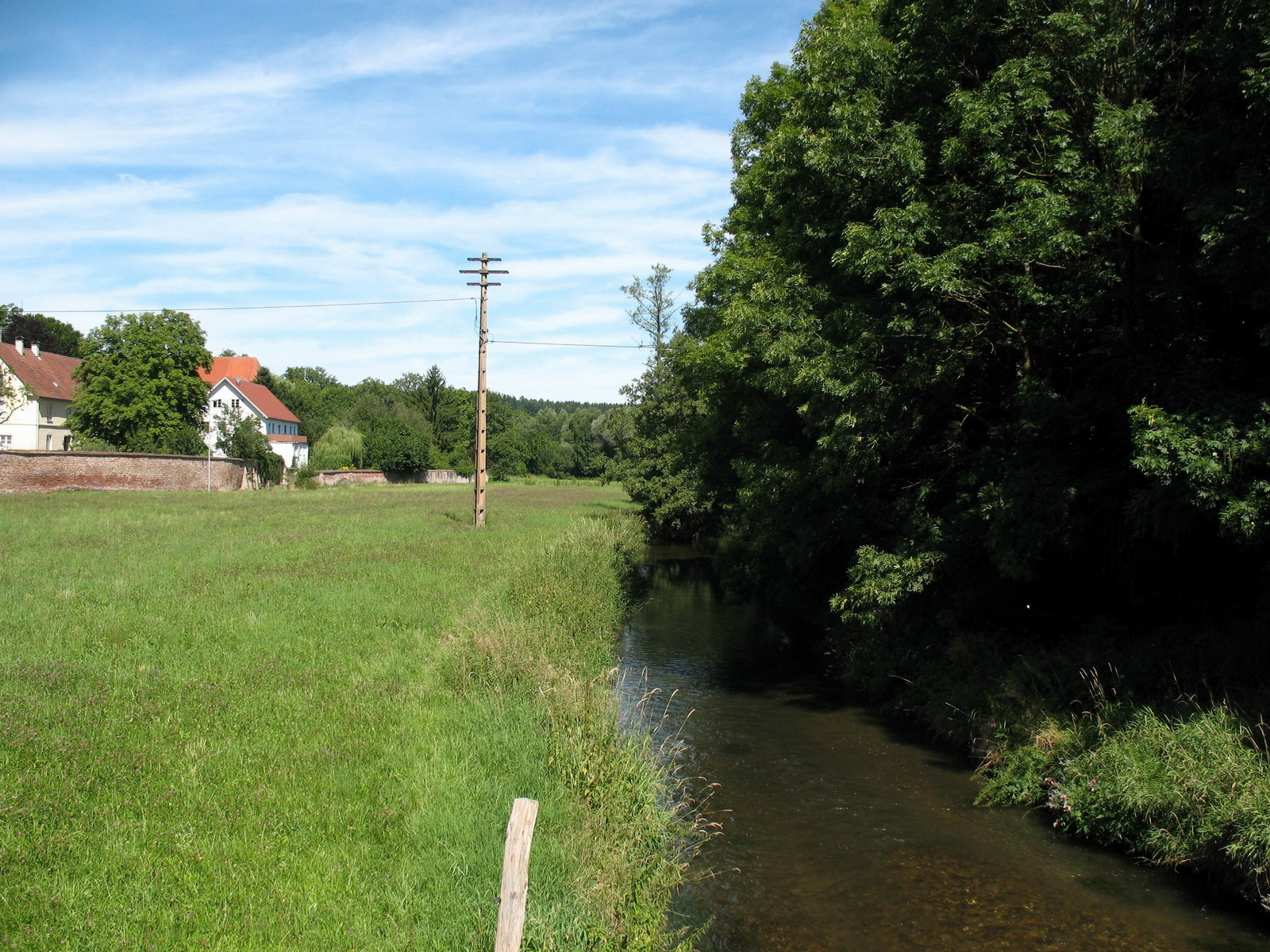

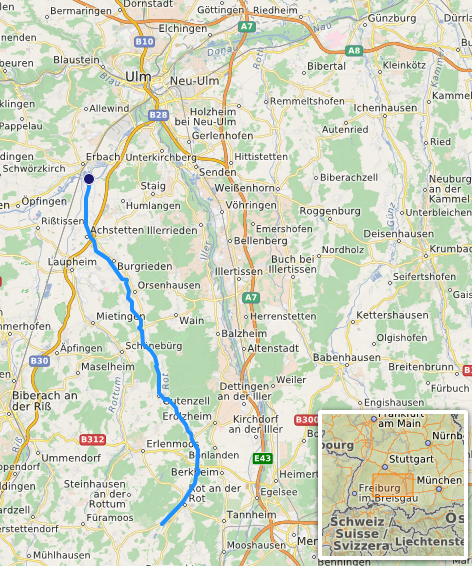

Location
- Country: Germany
- State: Baden-Württemberg

Physical characteristics
- Source
  - location: near Rot an der Rot
- Mouth
  - location: Danube
  - coordinates: 48°18′47″N 9°54′0″E
- Length: 55.8 km (34.7 mi)
- Basin size: 297 km^{2} (115 sq mi)
- Discharge
  - average: 10 m^{3}/s (350 cu ft/s)

Basin features
- Progression: Danube→ Black Sea

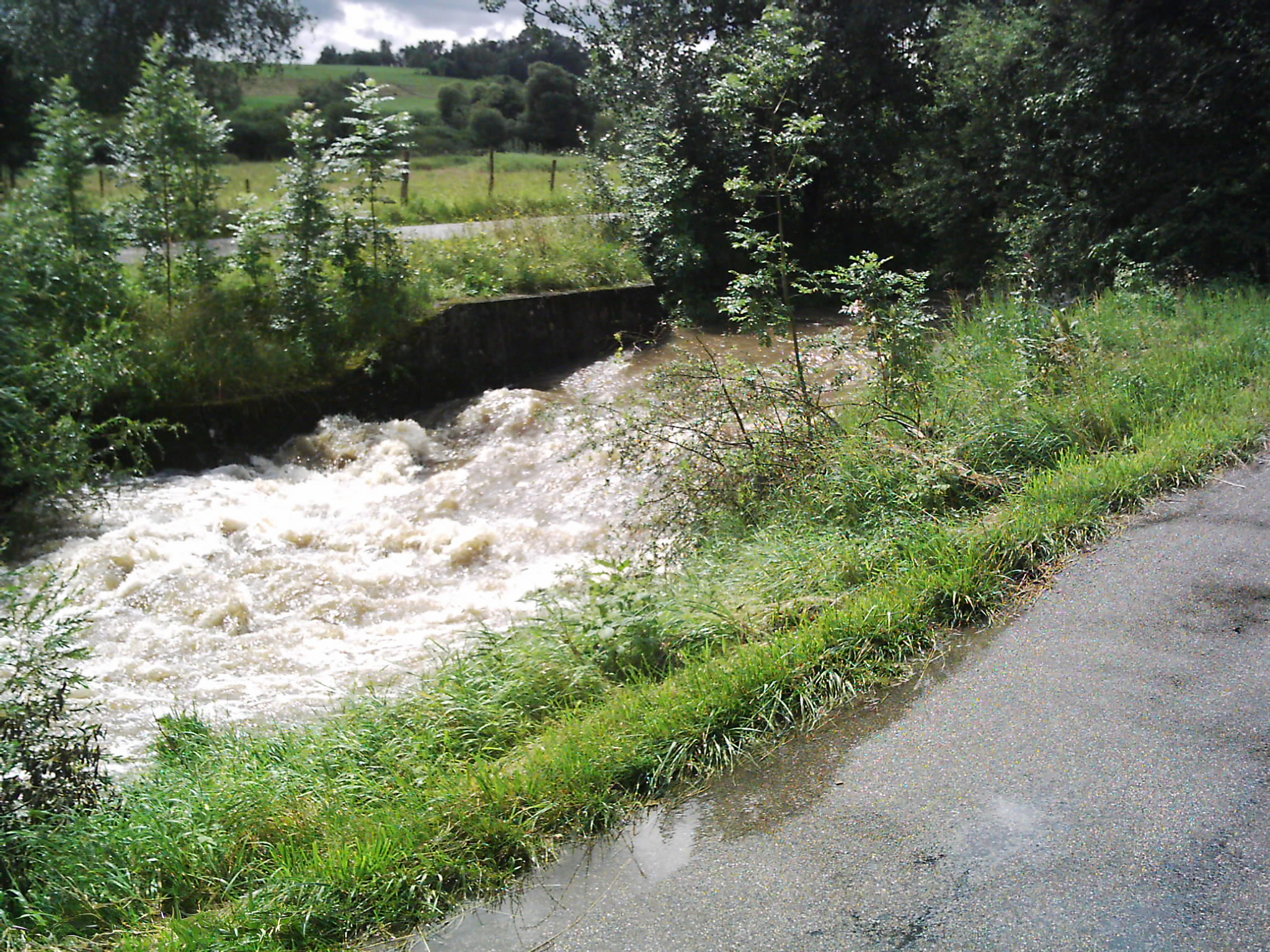
The Rot during a period of flooding

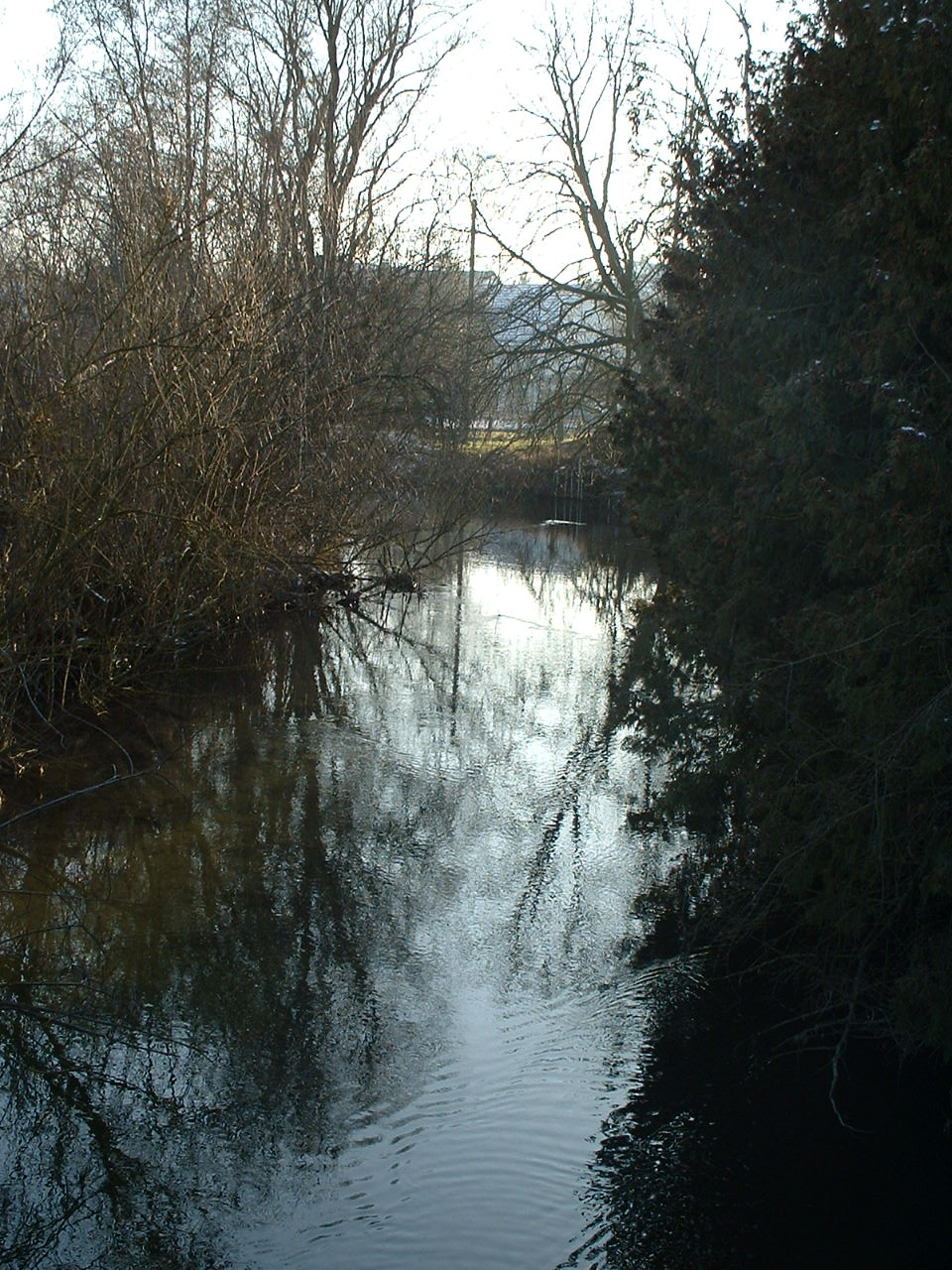
The Rot near Achstetten

The Rot (German pronunciation: [ʁoːt]) is a southern tributary of the river Danube in the region of Upper Swabia in Baden-Württemberg in Germany. It has a length of 56 km.

The Rot runs in a northerly direction parallel to the river Iller to the east, and Westernach to the west. Both these rivers are also tributaries to the Danube.

== Geography ==
The Rot originates in the district of Biberach in the vicinity of the village of Rot an der Rot, when two streams merge, the Paffenrieder Bach from the south and the Sendener Bach from the south-west.

The Rot meanders north through its increasingly widening valley, the heights of which are covered by woods, whereas the river itself is embedded first by moorland and wet meadows, later by fields.

Passing Rot an der Rot, where it is joined by the small river Haslach, the Rot flows through Eichenberg, Gutenzell-Hürbel, Schwendi, Burgrieden towards Achstetten and Stetten. From Schwendi onwards the river has been channelised, with a weir at Achstetten to slow down the flow of the water. Here the river forks, parts of the river are allowed to follow the original meandering bed whereas the main body of water follows the channelised route. After about 1,5 km the two merge again.

The Rot then flows through Dellmensingen, situated in the Alb-Donau District. North of Dellmensingen most of the waters of the Rot flow through an artificially created channel into the reservoir of a hydroelectric plant near Donaustetten. The remaining waters of the Rot keep flowing in its original stream bed to empty into the Danube north of Donaustetten.

== Tourism ==
Parts of the Upper Swabian Baroque Route and the Upper Swabian Mill Route run along the river Rot.

== See also ==
- Upper Swabia
- Danube
- List of rivers of Baden-Württemberg
