= Bad Wurzach =

- Town
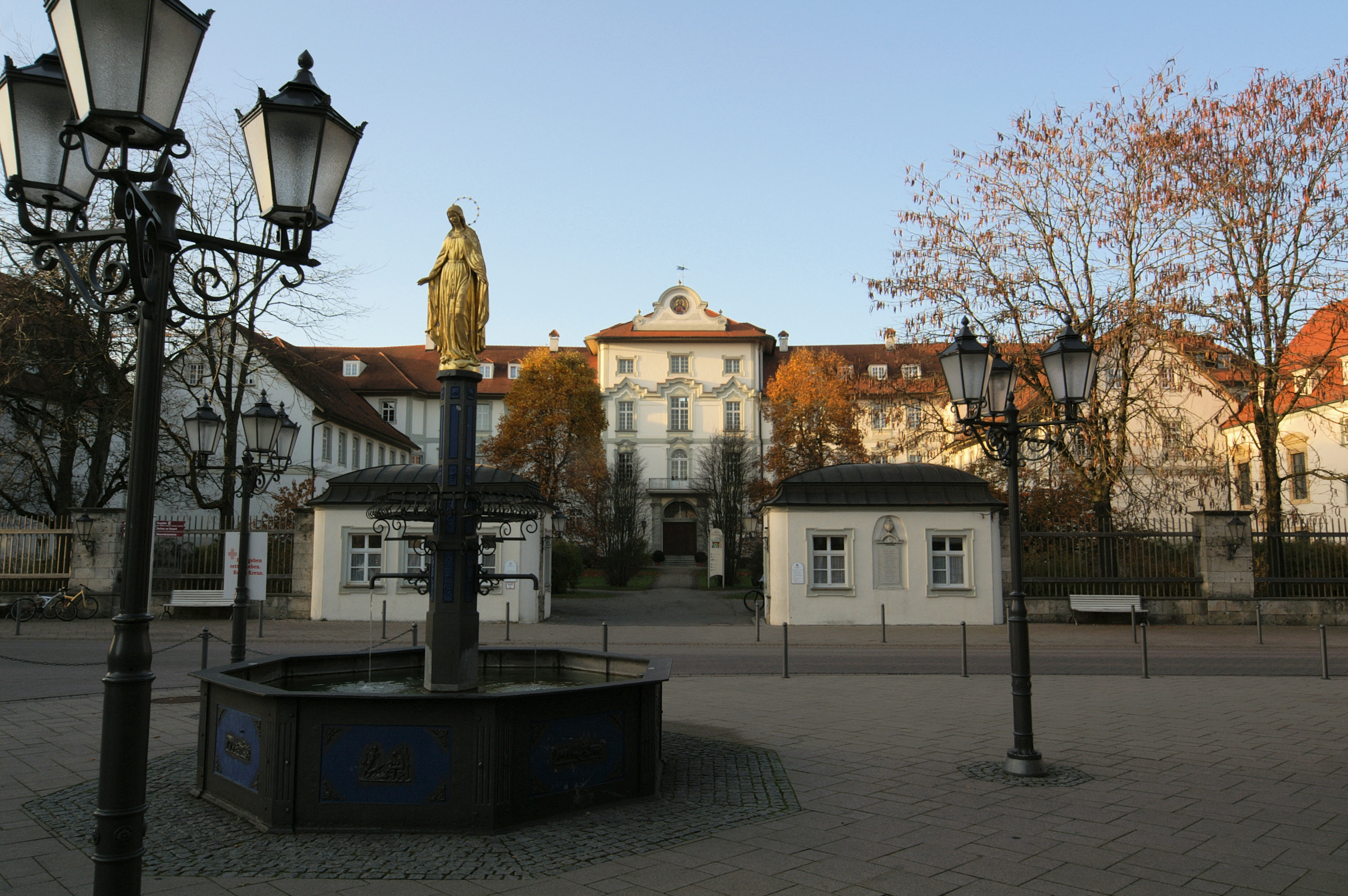
- Castle in Bad Wurzach

- Coat of arms

- Location of Bad Wurzach within Ravensburg district
- Interactive map of Bad Wurzach
- Location within Germany Location within Baden-Württemberg
- Coordinates: 47°54′34″N 9°53′58″E
- Country: Germany
- State: Baden-Württemberg
- Admin. region: Tübingen
- District: Ravensburg

Government
  - Mayor (2018–26): Alexandra Scherer

Area
  - Total: 182.24 km^{2} (70.36 sq mi)
- Elevation: 654 m (2,146 ft)

Population (2025-12-31)
  - Total: 14,927
  - Density: 81.908/km^{2} (212.14/sq mi)
- Time zone: UTC+01:00 (CET)
  - Summer (DST): UTC+02:00 (CEST)
- Postal codes: 88410
- Dialling codes: 07564
- Vehicle registration: RV
- Website: www.bad-wurzach.de

Bad Wurzach (German pronunciation: [baːt ˈvʊʁtsax]; until 1950 Wurzach) is a spa town in the state of Baden-Württemberg in southern Germany. It is a well known health-resort destination, and home to the oldest bog spa (in German: Moorheilbad) in Baden-Württemberg, as well as one of the largest contiguous raised bog areas in Europe. It is situated 25 kilometres (16 mi) northeast of Ravensburg and part of Ravensburg County, located in the Upper Swabia region. Since 1950 the town has carried the predicate Bad (spa). It is the third-largest municipality by area in the state of Baden-Württemberg, second only to Stuttgart, which is the capital of the state, and Baiersbronn.

== Geographical location ==
The municipality of Bad Wurzach (a spa town) lies in a broad lowland between the regions of Allgäu and Upper Swabia. Castle and town are adjacent to the so-called Wurzacher Ried (de:Wurzacher Ried, Wurzach Reed Marsh). The "Ried" is a very large mire. Covering almost 7 square miles (18 km^{2}) it is the largest contiguous, intact raised bog in Central Europe. The Council of Europe awarded this nature reserve the European Diploma of Protected Areas.

The town's height above sea-level varies between 650 metres (2,130 ft) and 800 metres (2,600 ft).

== Municipal subdivisions ==
The borough of Bad Wurzach consists of the following communities:

- Bad Wurzach (population 5,399)
- Arnach (1,436)
- Dietmanns (791)
- Eintürnen (735)
- Gospoldshofen (619)
- Haidgau (972)
- Hauerz (1,128)
- Seibranz (1,219)
- Unterschwarzach (1,385)
- Ziegelbach (925)

== Neighboring communities ==
The town borders with two communities in the county Biberach, as well as two cities and four communities in the county Ravensburg. The communities are, beginning in the north and going clockwise, Eberhardzell and Rot an der Rot in the county Biberach, and Aitrach, Aichstetten, Leutkirch im Allgäu, Kißlegg, Wolfegg and Bad Waldsee in the county Ravensburg.

== History ==
The town is first recorded on 13 June 1273 as 'Oppidum Wurzun. On 27 May 1333, "Emperor Louis the Bavarian granted to Hans, Truchsess of Waldburg, the town rights of Memmingen, a much larger town 25 kilometres (16 mi) away, to the settlement of "Wurzun". With town rights, Wurzach was given the right to exercise lower jurisdiction, the right to hold markets, and the right and duty to erect a surrounding wall to protect itself. In 1514 the Leinwandschau ("examination") was established. In 1515, the construction of the nunnery of Maria Rosengarten began. Its well preserved main buildings still stand today. On 14 April 1525, there was a battle between peasants on the Leprosenberg ("Leper Hill") just outside the town gates, as part of the Peasants' War which was raging at the time. In 1637, only 19 people remained in the town due to the effects and consequences of the Thirty Years' War and plagues. In 1675, the governance of Waldburg-Zeil-Wurzach was established. In 1806, the Barony of Wurzach came under the suzerainty of Württemberg and was allocated to the Oberamt Leutkirch (administrative district of Leutkirch), a large neighbouring town. In 1813 and 1814, during the War of Liberation, 35,301 soldiers were being taken care of in Wurzach. The Leprosenhaus (Leper House) located on the aforementioned Leprosenberg acted as a military hospital for 4,003 men. In 1903, the administrative district of Waldburg-Zeil-Wurzach was disbanded.

In 1904, the Rossberg-Wurzach railway opened. In 1936, the first moor-bath treatments were made available in the nunnery of Maria Rosengarten. Due to the disbandment of the administrative district of Leutkirch in 1938, Wurzach became part of the county of Wangen.

During the German occupation of the Channel Islands during World War II, many residents of the islands born in Great Britain were arrested and deported to Bad Wurzach, to be housed in camp "Ilag V-C". Despite wartime privations, friendships grew and a formal twinning was eventually made with Saint Helier, capital of Jersey.

In 1950, the town was granted the title of "Bad" along with spa town honours. With the municipal reform of 1972, the communities mentioned above in the town subdivisions became part of the town of Bad Wurzach. Since 1996, the town has undergone extensive restoration and repair, and modern buildings have been added as part of a reconditioning programme.

== Annexation ==
In the course of the Gemeindegebietsreform in Baden-Württemberg (county reform of 1972 in the state of Baden-Württemberg) the following, up until then solitary, communities were suburbanized and became part of Bad Wurzach:

- 1 June 1972: Arnach, Eintürnen and Ziegelbach
- 1 July 1972: Hauerz
- 1 December 1972: Gospoldshofen
- 1 January 1973: Dietmanns and Haidgau
- 1 January 1975: Seibranz

Haidgau already belonged to the county Ravensburg before the county reform. Unterschwarzach and Dietmanns belonged to the county Biberach. The other communities belonged to the county Wangen.

== History of the suburbanized communities ==
Around the year 950 a knight by the name of Berngarius de Arnanc was mentioned in a deed of donation. Until 1806 a tenth was paid to the monastery in nearby Wolfegg. After the monastery was handed over to the chieftain of Waldburg-Wolfegg-Waldsee the tenth was paid to him.

Arnach — was an autonomous community, belonging to the administrative district of Waldsee until 1938. After that it belonged to the county Wangen until 1972.

Dietmanns — used to be a priest village which formerly belonged to the shire of Wolfegg. It was part of the administrative district of Waldsee from 1806 until 1938. After that it was allocated to the county Biberach until 1973.

Eintürnen — belongs since 1500 to the shire of Wolfegg. In 1824 its status was elevated to that of an autonomous community belonging to the administrative district of Waldsee. It was part of the county Wangen from 1938 until 1972.

Gospoldshofen — the village was excluded from the town municipality of Wurzach in 1823 to become part of the administrative district of Leutkirch. Its status was subsequently elevated to that of an autonomous community. In 1938 it also became part of the county Wangen and remained so until 1972. The chieftain "von Waldburg zu Zeil-Wurzach" once used to be the landlord of this village.

Hauerz — became an autonomous community belonging to the administrative district of Leutkirch. It was part of the county Wangen, too, from 1938 until 1972.

Haidgau — this village, in earlier days also spelled Heidgau, belonged to the shire of Wolfegg. It was first mentioned in a deed of the monastery of St. Gallen in 797. It was an autonomous community belonging to the administrative district of Bad Waldsee, and starting from 1938 to the county Ravensburg.

Seibranz — was once taxable for the most part by the chieftain of Waldburg-Zeil. It used to be a community of the administrative district of Leutkirch, until it, too, shared the destiny of Arnach, Eintürnen, Gospoldshofen and Hauerz, in that it became a part of the county Wangen in 1938. It remained so until 1975.

Unterschwarzach — this village was once a priest village which belonged to the chieftain "von Waldburg-Wolfegg-Waldsee". It used to be part of the administrative district of Waldesee until 1938, and then became part of the county Biberach.

Ziegelbach — belonged once to the shire of Wolfegg. It was also part of the administrative district of Waldsee until 1938, and then became part of the county Ravensburg.

== Religions ==
The Carthusian Order has had a monastery here, Marienau Charterhouse, since 1964, when the displaced Maria Hain Charterhouse was re-settled here from its previous location near Düsseldorf.

=== Town council ===
The local election on 7 June 2009 delivered the following results:

1. CDU 52.57% (▼6.33%) — 11 seats

2. FWV 39.84% (▼1.26%) — 9 seats

3. Grüne Offene Liste 7.59% (▲7.59%) — 1 seat (▲1)

== International relations ==
Bad Wurzach has formal town twinning links with:

- Luxeuil-les-Bains, France
- Popielów, Poland
- Wallingford, United Kingdom
- Saint Helier, Jersey

== Coat of arms ==
The city's coat of arms features a crawdad. Legend has it that the inhabitants of Wurzach back then liked that little fellow, native to the town's creek called "Wurzacher Ach", so much that they used its image as their heraldic animal.

== Culture and places of interest ==
Bad Wurzach lies on the Schwäbische-Bäder-Strasse (Swabian-Spa-Road) and on the Oberschwäbische-Barock-Strasse (Upper Swabian-Baroque-Street), which both pass many places of interest. Furthermore, it lies on the Schwarzwald-Schwäbische-Alb-Allgäu-Weg (Black Forest-Swabian-Alb-Allgäu-Route).

=== Museums ===
- Leprosenhaus (Leper House) — once a leprosarium, and the birthplace of the painter Sepp Mahler. The museum is dedicated to the history of the leper house. The building also contains a gallery which features the paintings of Sepp Mahler.
- Käserei-Museum (Cheese Dairy Museum) — shows how cheese was made in the Allgäu region a hundred years ago and back in the 1930s. To finance the museum a so-called "Cheese Share" in the form of an indulgence voucher has been made available.
- Museum für klösterliche Kultur (Museum of Monasterial Culture)
- Upper Swabian Torf Museum (Peat Museum of Upper Swabia) — features among other things the nature trail "Auf den Spuren des Torfstechers" (On the Tracks of the Peat Cutter).
- Torfbahn im Wurzacher Ried (Peat Railway in the Reed of Wurzach) — special trips on the light railway (track width 600 mm) are available every second and fourth Sunday of each month. The tour starts at the "Zeiler Torfwerk" (peat cuttery of Zeil), located directly on Bundesstraße 465 (federal highway B465), and ends at the "Torfwerk Haidgau (peat cuttery of Haidgau) after a stunning ride through the moor".

== Civil works ==
- Schloss Bad Wurzach (Castle of Bad Wurzach). The castle features an extremely well preserved baroque era staircase, dating from 1728, designed by renowned baroque architect Balthasar Neumann. After the dissolution of the Roman Catholic seminary, the castle was a POW camp housing French officers from the start of World War II. After the occupation there of the Channel Islands, civilians had been brought to the castle and kept as detainees. There was very little contact in the first few years after the war between the former deportees and Upper Swabians. The first group of visitors arrived in 1970 on the occasion of the 25th anniversary of their liberation. Ever since there has been much contact. In 2002 a twinning between the cities of Saint Helier and Bad Wurzach has been established.
- Kloster "Maria Rosengarten" (Nunnery Maria Rosengarten). The nunnery features a rococo in-house chapel dating back to 1763.
- Gottesberg (God's Hill). On the top of the hill sits a pilgrimage church. The church is home to a "Heilig-Blut" (Sacred-Blood) relic. An annual Blutritt (Blood-Ride) takes place on the second Friday in July, which attracts horse riders, coachmen with their chariots, and onlookers from all over the county, and even beyond.
- Marienau Charterhouse (Kartause Marienau). This is the only Carthusian monastery now extant in the entire German-speaking area. It is not open to the public.

== Natural monuments ==
- Wurzacher Ried (Reed of Wurzach) — the reed is an integral nature reserve and one of the biggest still intact raised bog areas in Europe. The cutting of peat has been completely stopped in 1997.
- Wachbühl — a hill that rises to 791 m 791 metres (2,595 ft) above sea-level. It functions as a viewpoint and local hiking destination. It is also the highest point of the Zeil range (Zeiler Rücken).

== Friedrich-Schiedel Prize for Literature ==
Since 1983 the city accords the Friedrich Schiedel Prize for Literature every two years. The event takes place in the baroque staircase of the city's castle.

== Leisure and sports facilities ==
- Thermal spa with new sauna landscape
- Public indoor swimming pool
- Public outdoor swimming pool in Hauerz
- Numerous circular hiking trails in the Wurzacher Ried
- Skating spot
- Several sports grounds including one with artificial turf
- "Alpakahof" (Alpaka Farm). The Alpakahof is a petting zoo located at the edge of the integral nature preserve "Rohrsee" (Reed Lake). Its grounds cover 12 hectares, making it, therefore, the biggest petting zoo of the state of Baden-Württemberg.

== Economy and infrastructure ==
=== Traffic ===
Bad Wurzach lies on the Bundesstraße 465, which leads from Kirchheim unter Teck to Leutkirch im Allgäu. The city is connected through several bus lines with Bad Waldsee, Leutkirch, Isny im Allgäu, Ravensburg and Biberach among others. It belongs to the "Bodensee-Oberschwaben-Verkehrsbund" (Lake Constanze-Upper Swabia Traffic Federation).

The railway line Rossberg-Bad Wurzach (Bahnlinie Rossberg-Bad Wurzach) had been opened in 1904 as a connection to the Württembergian-Allgäu railway line (Württembergischen-Allgäubahn). After the closure through the DB Cargo AG in 2002 the city of Bad Wurzach bought the cargo railway line on 1 October 2004 to continue the operation of the railway together with the Connex Cargo Logistics company.

=== Local companies ===
The biggest employer is the glassworks factory Saint-Gobain Oberland AG. The company, which now also functions as German head office, has been founded in 1946 as "Oberland Glas AG". The four factories in Germany operate under the name of the French parent company Saint-Gobain.

== Educational institutions ==
The Gymnasium Salvatorkolleg is a private secondary school, which takes nine years to graduate from and leads to a university-entrance diploma. Under urban sponsorship there are also a Realschule (secondary school, which takes six years to graduate from), a Hauptschule (secondary school, which takes five years to graduate from, a full-time Werkrealschule (different type of Realschule, which also takes six years to graduate from), a primary and secondary school, six primary schools, and a Förderschule (school for students with learning disabilities). There are also 6 Roman Catholic and five urban Kindergartens to choose from for the parents of the city's youngest citizens.

== Spa Service Bad Wurzach ==
The urban spa service has been founded in 1948, and allowed the city to become quickly a significant health-resort destination. Bad Wurzach is regarded as the oldest moor-spa in Baden-Württemberg. It exists since 1936 and is the only one of its kind in the Allgäu region. Since the opening of the "Vitalium" in 1999 the city also features a thermal spa. The first moor-bath treatments to combat chronic musculoskeletal affections were made available in the nunnery "Maria Rosengarten". Initially, those treatments were only available to women, one year later also to men. This spa service was first operated by the sister's order of Arme Schulschwestern (Poor School Sisters). These moor-bath treatments became extremely popular over the years because of their healing effects. By 1947 already 2,800 customers had a total of 7,000 treatments. Nowadays 20,000 of these treatments take place per year. Due to capacity problems and steadily increasing demand the "Kurmittelhaus" (Therapeutic Appliance House) had been opened on "Parkstrasse" (Park Street) in 1948.

In 1950 the city was granted the predicate "Bad". This prefix of the city's name indicates that there is a bath house, more specifically a therapeutic bath house, present. In Bad Wurzach it is the "Moorheilbad" (Therapeutic Moor-Bath House). In the federal republic of Germany the protected prefix "Bad" can be carried only by cities with a state-approved therapeutic bath house. In 1968 the Kurmittelhaus on Parkstrasse had gotten too small, too. Therefore, the city decided to build another Kurmittelhaus, located on the slope of a small hill by the name "Reischberg", within the city. In 1977 the "Kurhotel Moorsanatorium Reischberg" (Regimen Hotel Moor-Sanatorium Reischberg) opened its doors and was able to celebrate its 30th anniversary in 2007. The construction of the "Vitalium", a health and wellness facility, in 1999 extended the touristic health and relaxation possibilities yet again, and increased the attractiveness of the Moorheilbad. The Vitalium underwent extensive structural alteration works in 2007. Added were an outdoor thermal-pool, a generous sauna landscape, and a so-called "Wohlfühlhaus" (Feel Well House) for wellness treatments. The urban spa service of Bad Wurzach is an owner-operated municipal enterprise. It consists of the health center with its attached Vitalium, the regimen hotel Moorsanatorium Reischberg, the Therapeutic Appliance House on the edge of the "Kurpark" (Regimen Park), the public indoor swimming pool, the public outdoor moor pool, and the "Kurverwaltung" (Regimen administration). The administration of the entire enterprise is managed by the head office "Kurbetriebsverwaltung". (Regimen Business Administration).

== Notable people ==
- Johannes Ruez (1691-1760), Bildhauer
- Franz-Xaver Schnitzer (1740–85), composer and organist
- Clemens Högg (1780–1845), SPD politician and member of parliament in Bavaria
- Oskar Graf (1782–1842), politician and member of parliament in Baden
- Carl Joseph Leiprecht (1903–81), bishop of Rottenburg-Stuttgart
- Father Agnellus Schneider (1913–2007), writer and environmentalist who lived and worked in Bad Wurzach
- Gerd Riss (born 1965), 11-time motorcycle champion (speedway)
- Gunther Hartmann (born 1966), 2012 Leibniz Prize winner, innate immunologist and clinical pharmacologist
- Heiko Butscher (born 1980), football player who grew up in Bad Wurzach
