= Gunther Hartmann =

German immunologist and clinical pharmacologist

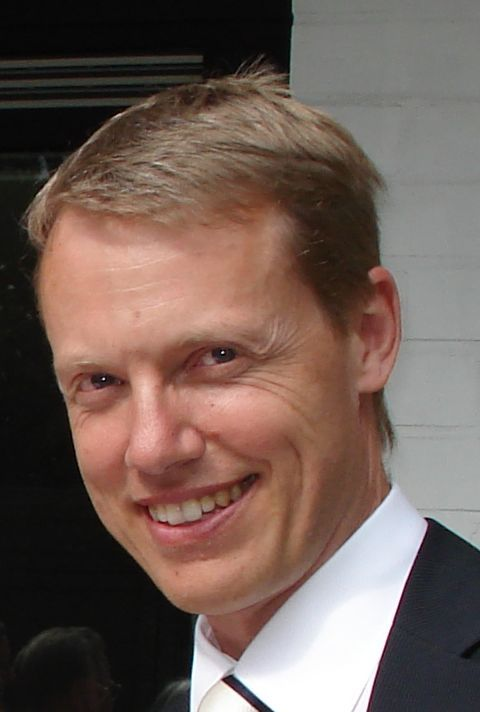
Gunther Hartmann, November 2009

Gunther Hartmann (born 7 December 1966 in Leutkirch) is a German immunologist and clinical pharmacologist. Since 2007 he has been the Director of the Institute of Clinical Chemistry and Clinical Pharmacology at the University Hospital of the University of Bonn.

== Career ==
In 1986, Hartmann graduated from Salvator College Catholic High School in Bad Wurzach and then began his medical studies at the Medical School of the University of Ulm. He earned his medical degree there in 1994 from the Department of Clinical Genetics and then became a clinical fellow at the Medizinische Klinik Innenstadt of LMU Munich. In 1998, he joined the lab of Arthur Krieg at the University of Iowa as a postdoctoral researcher. Then in 2001, he completed his habilitation degree in Clinical Pharmacology at LMU Munich.

Hartmann's group has long been interested in understanding how the innate immune system recognizes foreign nucleic acids, to protect against threats from viruses and pathogens. This work began when he was a postdoc at LMU Munich. In the Krieg lab in Iowa, he characterized the CpG motif in DNA that is detected by human Toll-like receptor 9 (TLR9) and then back at LMU Munich, he studied the immunobiological consequences of TLR9 activation. First at LMU Munich and then at the University of Bonn, his group went on to study RNA recognition by TLR7, specifically the TLR7-mediated detection of short interfering RNAs (siRNA). Along these lines, the Hartmann group has studied RIG-I as a sensor for cytosolic RNA, and identified blunt-ended double-stranded RNA with a 5´-triphosphate as the RIG-I ligand. In addition, the group has also studied the recognition of cytosolic double-stranded DNA by the cGAS/STING pathway.

In 2005, Hartmann was made head of the Department of Clinical Pharmacology at the University Hospital Bonn (UKB), and in 2007, he was appointed Professor and Director of the Institute of Clinical Chemistry and Clinical Pharmacology including the Central Laboratory at the UKB. Since 2009, he has been a member of the expert committee on Cancer Therapy Trials at the German Cancer Aid organization. He is the founding and current spokesperson for the ImmunoSensation Cluster of Excellence, funded by the Deutsche Forschungsgemeinschaft (DFG) starting in November 2012 and renewed in 2019. He has served as president of the international Oligonucleotide Therapeutic Society (2011–12). In 2012, Hartmann was awarded the Gottfried Wilhelm Leibniz Prize by the DFG in recognition of his work on the detection of nucleic acids by the immune system. In 2016, he was appointed Vice Dean of Research for the Medical Faculty of the University of Bonn. Beginning in 2018, he is serving as the spokesperson for the Collaborative Research Center/Transregio grant “Nucleic Acid Immunity”, funded by the DFG. In addition, Hartmann was one of the founders of a spin-off company (Rigontec GmbH) developing 5'-triphosphate RNAs to target RIG-I, which was acquired by Merck & Co. in 2017.

== Honors ==
- 2000: "Young Master" of the German Society of Hematology and Oncology
- 2000: Paul Martini Prize
- 2004: Georg Heberer Award of the Chiles Foundation in Portland
- 2004: Ludwig Heilmeyer Award
- 2004: Biofuture Award of the Federal Ministry of Education and Research
- 2007: Wilhelm Vaillant Prize for Medical Research
- 2009: GoBio Prize of the Federal Ministry of Education and Research
- 2011: Dr. Friedrich Sasse Medal in gold of the Berlin Medical Society
- 2012: Gottfried Wilhelm Leibniz Prize
- 2013: Member of the German Academy of Sciences Leopoldina
