= Battle of Wurzach =

Battle in the German Peasants' War

Coordinates: 47°54′23″N 9°53′02″E

Battle of Wurzach Schlacht am Leprosenberg
- Part of German Peasants' War
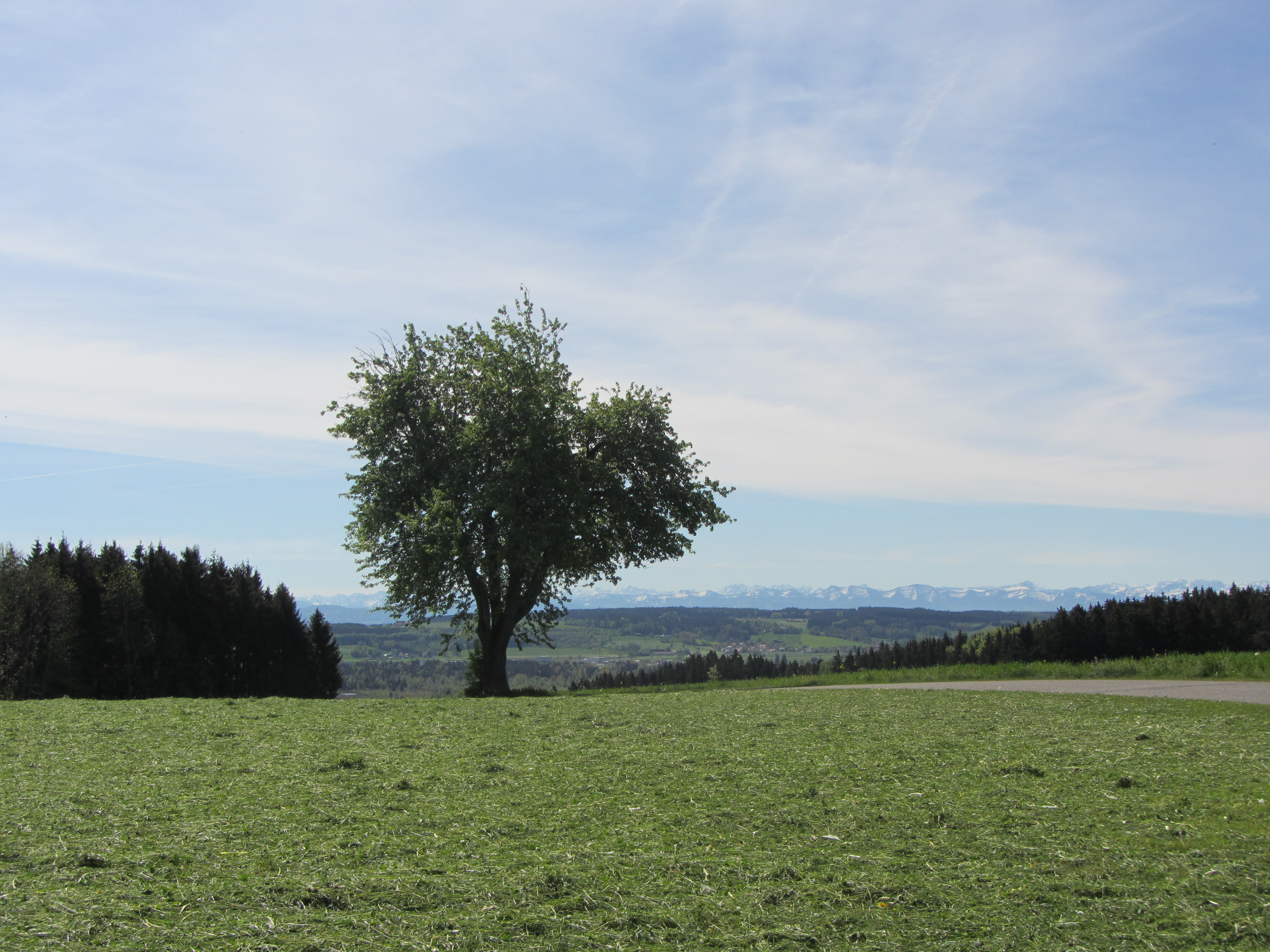
- View from the Grabener Höhe of the battlefield in 2012
Date	14 April 1525
Location	near Bad Wurzach
Result	Victory for the Swabian League

Belligerents
Old Swabian Confederation	Swabian League

Commanders and leaders
Pfaff-Florian of Aichstetten	George III, Truchsess of Waldburg-Zeil

Strength
7,000	7,000

Casualties and losses
140	unknown

The Battle of Wurzach (German: Gefecht bei Wurzach or Schlacht am Leprosenberg), was a battle during the German Peasants' War that took place near Bad Wurzach in the present-day district of Ravensburg in Upper Swabia.

== Course of the battle ==
During Easter Week, on Tuesday 11 April 1525, Farmer George (Bauernjörg) and his army were still deployed on a line from Ulm to Leipheim. In the evening of that day he encamped in Baltringen, one of the bases of the rebellion. Three days later, the mercenaries (Landsknechte), armoured cavalry (Panzerreiter), and camp followers (Tross) of the Swabian League, financially supported by Jacob Fugger, encamped in the rather flat terrain west of the town towards Bad Waldsee, near the Leprosenberg ("Leper's Hill"). The peasants under their leader Pfaff-Florian of Aichstetten had oriented their positions south of the town on the hilly terrain of Auf der Bleiche below the Ziegelberg hill. Small skirmishes took place in the run-up to the battle. Both army commanders had considerable local knowledge as the battlefield was only 20 kilometres from each of their home towns. The peasants were unable to penetrate the town walls surrounding Wurzach or to convince the townsfolk to take their side.

On Good Friday, 14 April 1525, the positions of the peasant army were fired upon by the cannons of the Swabian League. The two forces each had about the same number of troops. However, the experienced Landsknechte and armoured riders of the Swabian League, with their better armament and training, were the decisive factors in the battle.

In the evening the overmatched peasants began to withdraw. Those peasants who fled to the west of the positions of the Swabian League were lucky. They could escape in the direction of Gaisbeuren. The fleeing peasants who tried to escape in the night in the direction of the Wurzacher Ried and Wurzacher Ach were probably killed, since they were also pursued by Farmer George's cavalry.

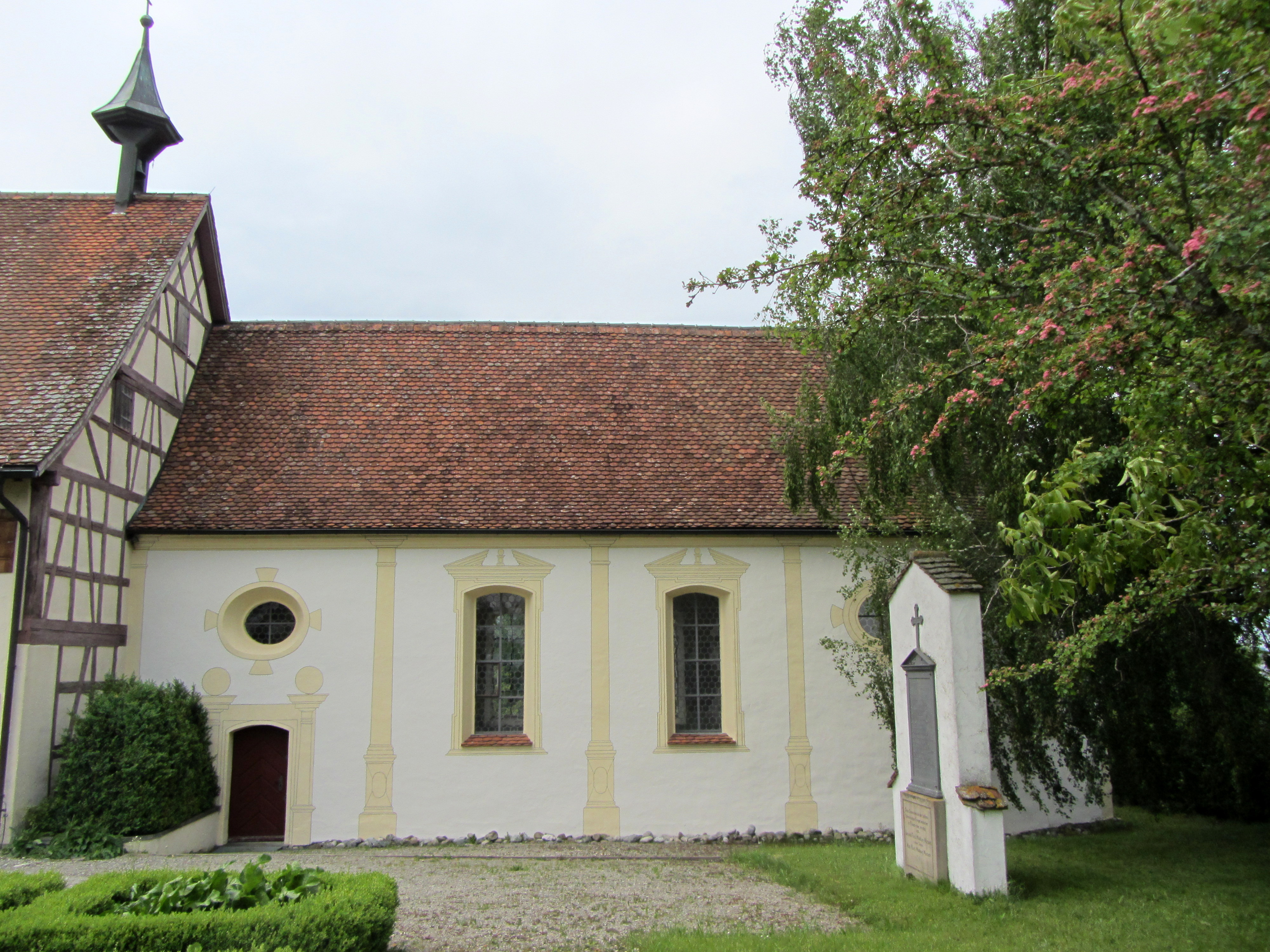
The Lepers' Chapel, 2012

A series of further battles followed. By September 1525, all fighting and punitive action was over and Emperor Charles V and Pope Clement VII thanked the Swabian League for their intervention.

Pfaff-Florian was one of the survivors of the battle and fled to the Confederation after the Treaty of Weingarten was negotiated. As a rule, commanders and leaders were executed immediately upon capture. Captured rebel peasants had to pay a general bounty of 6 guilders in instalments and were later released. George and his cousin, William, were each appointed by Emperor Charles V on 27 July 1526 in Toledo as a Hereditary Imperial Steward (Reichserbtruchsess). The Lepers' Hospital (Leprosenhaus) and Lepers' Chapel (Leprosenkapelle), founded in 1505, may still be seen on the site of the battlefield today.

== Literatur ==
- Wilhelm Zimmermann: Der große deutsche Bauernkrieg. Köhler, Stuttgart, 1841–43; Dietz, Stuttgart, 1891; Dietz, Berlin, 1952; deb, Berlin, 1980 and 1982 (7th edition, ISBN 3-920303-26-1); Berlin, 1993 ISBN 3-320-01829-9.
- Peter Blickle: Die Revolution von 1525. 4th revised and bibliographically expanded edition. Oldenbourg, Munich, 2004, ISBN 3-486-44264-3.
