= Upper Swabia =

Region in Germany

Coordinates: 48°19′59″N 10°30′0″E

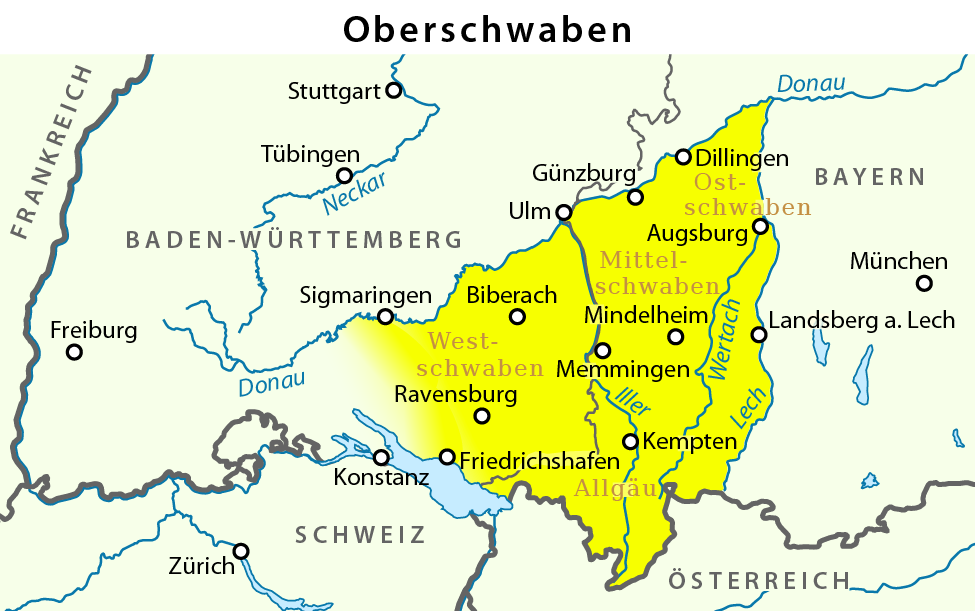
Map of Upper Swabia

Upper Swabia (German: Oberschwaben [ˈoːbɐˌʃvaːbn̩] or Schwäbisches Oberland) is a region in Germany in the federal states of Baden-Württemberg and Bavaria. The name refers to the area between the Swabian Jura, Lake Constance and the Lech. Its counterpart is Lower Swabia (Niederschwaben), the region around Heilbronn.

== Geography ==
The region of Upper Swabia is situated in the central south of Germany consisting of the south-east of Baden-Württemberg and the south-west bavarian Swabia region and lies on the Iller-Lech Plateau, also known as the Upper Swabian Plain, one of the natural regions of Germany. The landscape of Upper Swabia was formed by retreating glaciers after the Riss glaciation, leaving behind a large number of shallows which quickly filled up with water. This led to the large quantity of lakes in Upper Swabia. The landscape of Upper Swabia is quite hilly rising from approximately 458 metres above sea level in the valley of the river Danube to a maximum of 833 metres above sea level in the south-west of Upper Swabia only to drop again to 395 meters above sea level at Lake Constance. The European watershed also passes through the region, with some rivers emptying into the Danube (ultimately flowing into the Black Sea) and others emptying into Lake Constance (ultimately ending in the North Sea).

Due to Upper Swabia's altitude and hilly terrain, agriculture consists mainly of dairy farming, the exception being the basin of the river Schussen, where the predominant produce is hops and fruits.

Upper Swabia is still a very rural area dominated by villages. The urban population is concentrated in the cities of Augsburg, Friedrichshafen, Ravensburg & Weingarten and Biberach an der Riß as well as Memmingen and Günzburg.

The eastern border of Upper Swabia has been disputed for some time. Historically, the river Lech marks the border between Swabia and Bavaria. However, this would mean that large parts of Bavarian Swabia would have to be incorporated into Upper Swabia. As a result, these days the river Iller marks the eastern border of Upper Swabia.

The inhabitants of the former Free Imperial City Ulm and those that belonged to the former Imperial Abbey of Zwiefalten do not consider themselves as being part of Upper Swabia. Yet, in spite of their location close to the Swabian Alb, geographically, historically and culturally, they have always been closely connected to Upper Swabia.

== Administration ==
Upper Swabia is part of the Regierungsbezirk Tübingen, a Regierungsbezirk, an administrative district of a federal state.

The following districts are wholly or partially part of Upper Swabia:

- Alb-Donau
- Biberach
- Bodenseekreis (Lake Constance)
- Ravensburg
- Reutlingen
- Sigmaringen
- Ulm

== History ==
Upper Swabia has been populated at least since the Neolithic age. Archaeological evidence confirming this was discovered around the Federsee, a lake near Bad Buchau. Until around the year 260 CE, the region that was to become Upper Swabia, was part of the Roman province of Raetia, after which the Alamanni invaded the Agri Decumates and settling there.

During the Merovingian period, Upper Swabia came under the rule of the Frankish kings. It was part of the Duchy of the Alamanni. During the same period, the Christianization of the region began.

During the Carolingian, Ottonian and Salian period, Upper Swabia was part of the Duchy of Swabia.

From the High Middle Ages onwards, Upper Swabia became fragmented into a large number of small independent political units: Free Imperial Cities, principalities, counties, seigneuries, Imperial Abbeys and other clerical territories.

During the German Peasants' War of 1524–1525, Upper Swabia was a centre of the revolt. The peasants formed three armed groups, called Haufen (or Haufe): the Allgäuer Haufen, active in the Allgäu and eastern Upper Swabia, the Seehaufen, centred on the region north of Lake Constance, and the Baltringer Haufen, named after the village of Baltringen, a few kilometres south of Laupheim in northern Upper Swabia.

During the revolt, numerous castles and monasteries in Upper Swabia were destroyed by the peasants. By July 1525, however, the rising had been utterly suppressed in Upper Swabia, with countless peasants losing their lives either due to battles or due to punitive measures inflicted upon them afterwards by their lords. Economically and socially, the consequences were dramatic: whole communities were bankrupt and unable to pay proper taxes for a long time, the legal position of peasants was not to be altered for another 300 years, and due to the large number of outlawed peasants trying to survive by illegal means, such as robbery, commerce was severely hindered.

This instability was one of the factors that lead to Upper Swabia's becoming a plaything of marauding armies during the Thirty Years War 1618 - 1648. Military actions followed by disease, such as the plague, led to a severe depopulation of Upper Swabia.

After the end of the war, the Catholic Church intensified its efforts to regain ground from the Protestants. These efforts are known as the Counter-Reformation. The local lords, secular and clerical, tried to attract immigrants to areas affected by the ravages of war and to re-populate these areas. This led to an economic upturn within the region. The efforts of the Counter-Reformation and the newly acquired financial ability of both secular and clerical lords enabled them to restore, extend and enhance the already existing seigneurial buildings in Baroque-style. The result of this is today called Upper Swabian Baroque.

During the secularization and mediatization in 1803, almost all monasteries were dissolved and the Free Imperial Cities lost their independence. With the end of the Holy Roman Empire in 1806, marked by the Reichsdeputationshauptschluss, catholic Upper Swabia was incorporated into the protestant Kingdom of Württemberg. This annexation was finalized during the Congress of Vienna in 1815.

The aristocratic dynasties that ruled Upper Swabia for centuries still have considerable political and economic influence and power. After World War I and the end of the Kingdom of Württemberg, Upper Swabia became part of the new federal state Württemberg.

After World War II, the northernmost areas of Upper Swabia became part of the American occupation zone, while the larger, southern area became part of the French occupation zone. In 1946, the Allied authorities founded the states of Württemberg-Baden and Württemberg-Hohenzollern, the borders of which ran along the borders of the occupation zones. As a consequence, the northern areas of Upper Swabia became part of the state of Württemberg-Baden and the southern areas became part of the state of Württemberg-Hohenzollern. Both states joined the Federal Republic of Germany on its founding in 1949. This situation lasted until 1952, when, following a referendum the previous year, Württemberg-Baden and Württemberg-Hohenzollern together with Baden created the new federal state of Baden-Württemberg.

== Tourism ==
=== Theme routes ===
- The Upper Swabian Baroque Route has several branches, leading from Ulm to Lake Constance and back again. During the age of Counter-Reformation in the 17th and 18th century, a large number of churches, abbeys and secular buildings were built inBaroque-style.
- The Swabian Spa Route connects various spa towns, recognizable by the designation Bad.
- The eastern leg of the German Half-Timbered Buildings Route leads from Bad Urach to Lake Constance, passing through Biberach an der Riß, Riedlingen, Pfullendorf and Meersburg.
- The Upper Swabian Mill Route was established in 2005 and passes along more than 100 grinding mills in the region.

=== Vantage points ===
Name	Elevation	Description
Höchsten	833 m (2733 ft)	The highest mountain in Upper Swabia is a popular vantage point; situated approximately 17 km north of Lake Constance in western Upper Swabia.
Waldburg Castle	772 m (2533 ft)	Situated on top of a cone-shaped mountain to the east of Ravensburg.
Bussen	767 m (2516 ft)	The "Holy Mountain of Upper Swabia", also a place of pilgrimage.
Gehrenberg	754 m (2474 ft)	Mountain in the vicinity of Markdorf. On top of the mountain, there is an observation tower with views of Lake Constance and the Alps (weather permitting).
Grabener Höhe	754 m (2474 ft)	Located between Bad Waldsee and Bad Wurzach, it offers views on the Alps and the Wurzacher Ried, one of the largest bog areas in Central Europe.

In spite of this, the touristic development of Upper Swabia has been rather slow during the last decennia. The bordering regions of Allgäu, Swabian Alb, Black Forest and particularly the area around Lake Constance have been more prosperous. Even politicians remarked in the 1990s that Upper Swabia was more an industrial region, albeit only in a few centres, than a tourist destination. However, during recent years, amends have been made in order to attract more tourism. This has been supported by the state government which provided subsidies, particularly to improve rural infrastructure.

== Regional media ==
=== Print media ===
- Schwäbische Zeitung (Swabian Newspaper), based in Leutkirch im Allgäu; most read daily .
- Südwest-Presse (South-Western Press)), based in Ulm, mostly read in northern Upper Swabia, and its counterpart for the region around Lake Constance the Südkurier ('Southern Courier') based in Konstanz.
- Wochenblatt (Weekly Paper), free weekly newspaper, based in Biberach an der Riß.
- Memminger Kurier (Weekly Paper), free weekly newspaper, based in Memmingen

=== Radio and television ===
- Südwestrundfunk ('Southwest Broadcasting') have local and regional studios for radio and television broadcasts in Ulm and Friedrichshafen.
- REGIO TV Euro 3, regional television channel for southern Upper Swabia.
- Radio 7, commercial radio station, based in Ulm with several local studios throughout the region.
- Donau 3 FM, local commercial radio station, based in Ulm, for the surrounding region.
- RT1-Südschwaben, local commercial radio station, based in Memmingen, for the surrounding region between Memmingen, Mindelheim and Illertissen

== Infrastructure ==
=== Railways ===
Upper Swabia is criss-crossed by several railway lines:

- Württembergische Südbahn (Wurttembergian Southern Railway), the most important railway line, linking Ulm with Friedrichshafen on Lake Constance. At Laupheim-West station a railway line branches off, connecting the city of Laupheim with the main artery of the Wurttembergian Southern Railway. Originally this railway line extended as far as the municipality of Schwendi. In Warthausen, the so-called Öchsle, a narrow-gauge railway line to Ochsenhausen, branches off. These days, the Öchsle is only used as a museum railway line. From May to October, it runs every weekend and on public holidays too, from July until September also on Thursdays. Additionally, there are extra tours during the winter months.
- Württembergische Allgäubahn (Wurttembergian Allgäu Railway), connecting Aulendorf with Memmingen
- Donautalbahn (Danube Valley Railway), leading from Ulm via Sigmaringen to Donaueschingen in Baden. Finally
- Zollernalbbahn (Zollern Alb Railway), which on its stretch from Aulendorf to Sigmaringen passes through Upper Swabia, before leading on to Tübingen across the Swabian Alb mountain range, passing the ancestral home of the dynasty of the Hohenzollern, hence the name of the railway line.

=== Roads ===
There are no motorways (Autobahnen) in Upper Swabia. However, several federal highways (Bundesstraßen) traverse the region:

- Bundesstraße 31, along the northern shore of Lake Constance.
- Bundesstraße 311, from Ulm to Sigmaringen.
- Bundesstraße 30, from Ulm to Friedrichshafen.
- Bundesstraße 32, from Sigmaringen to Wangen.
- Bundesstraße 33, from Ravensburg to Meersburg.
- Bundesstraße 312, from Riedlingen to Memmingen.
- Bundesstraße 465, from Ehingen to Leutkirch im Allgäu.
- Bundesstraße 467, from Ravensburg to Kressbronn.
- Bundesautobahn 7
- Bundesautobahn 96

=== Airports ===
- Bodensee-Airport Friedrichshafen is serviced by several airlines and also caters for charter flights to popular holiday destinations.
- Memmingen Airport is serviced by several airlines and also caters for charter flights to popular holiday destinations.

== Gallery ==
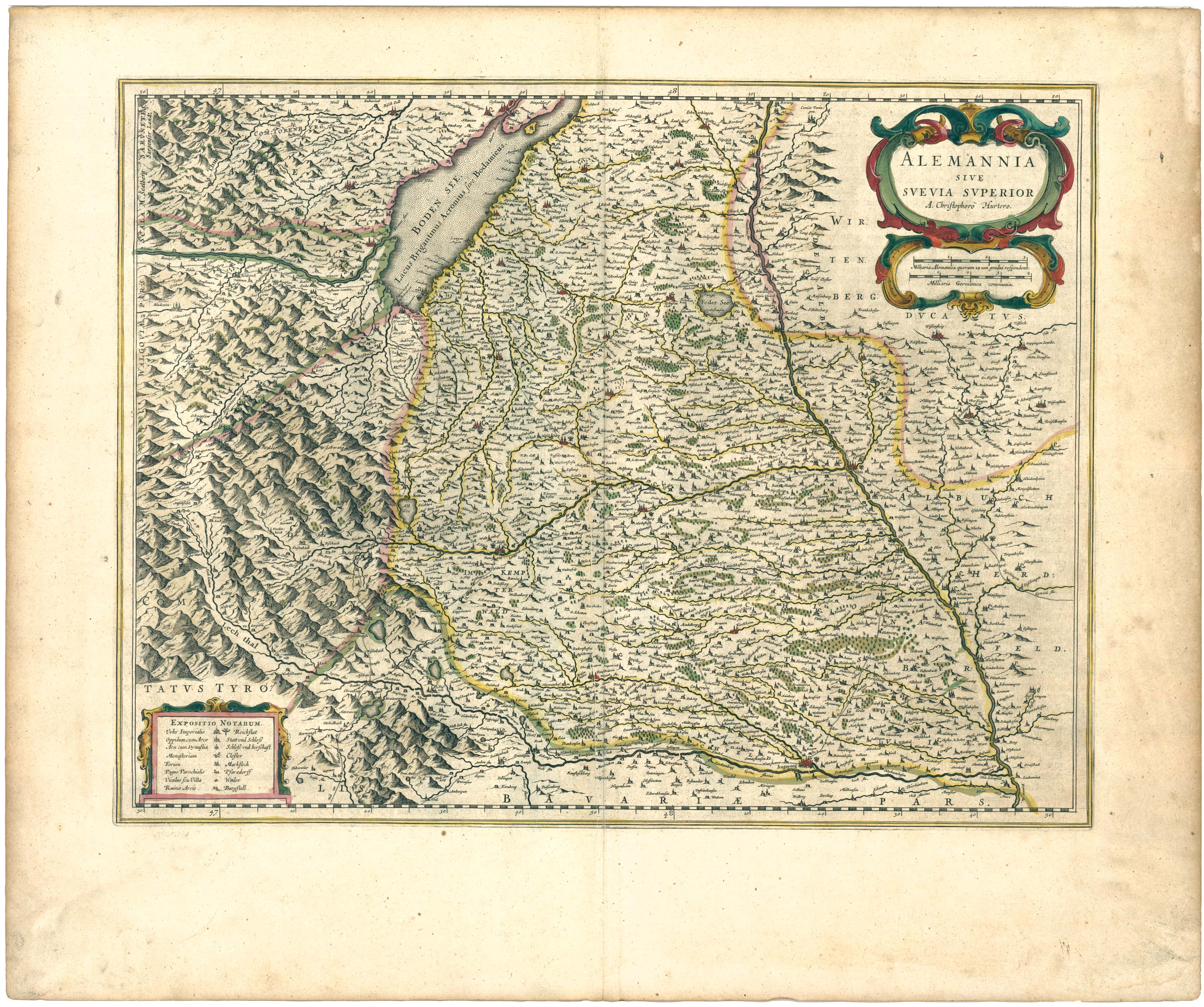
Upper Swabia in 1645

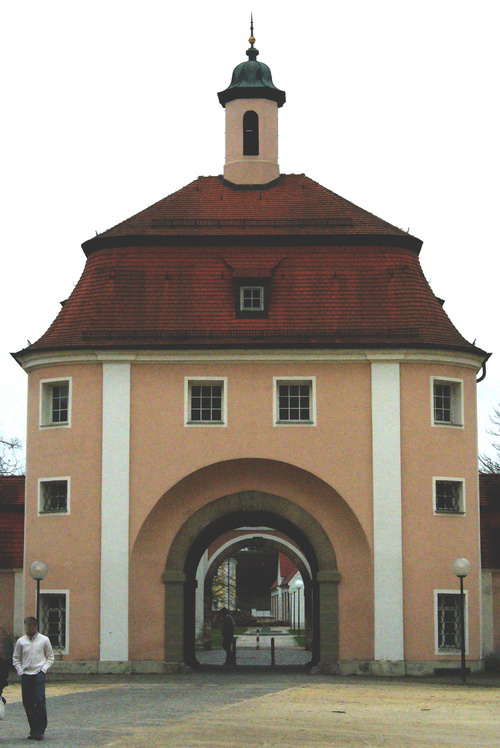
Gate of monastery in Wiblingen

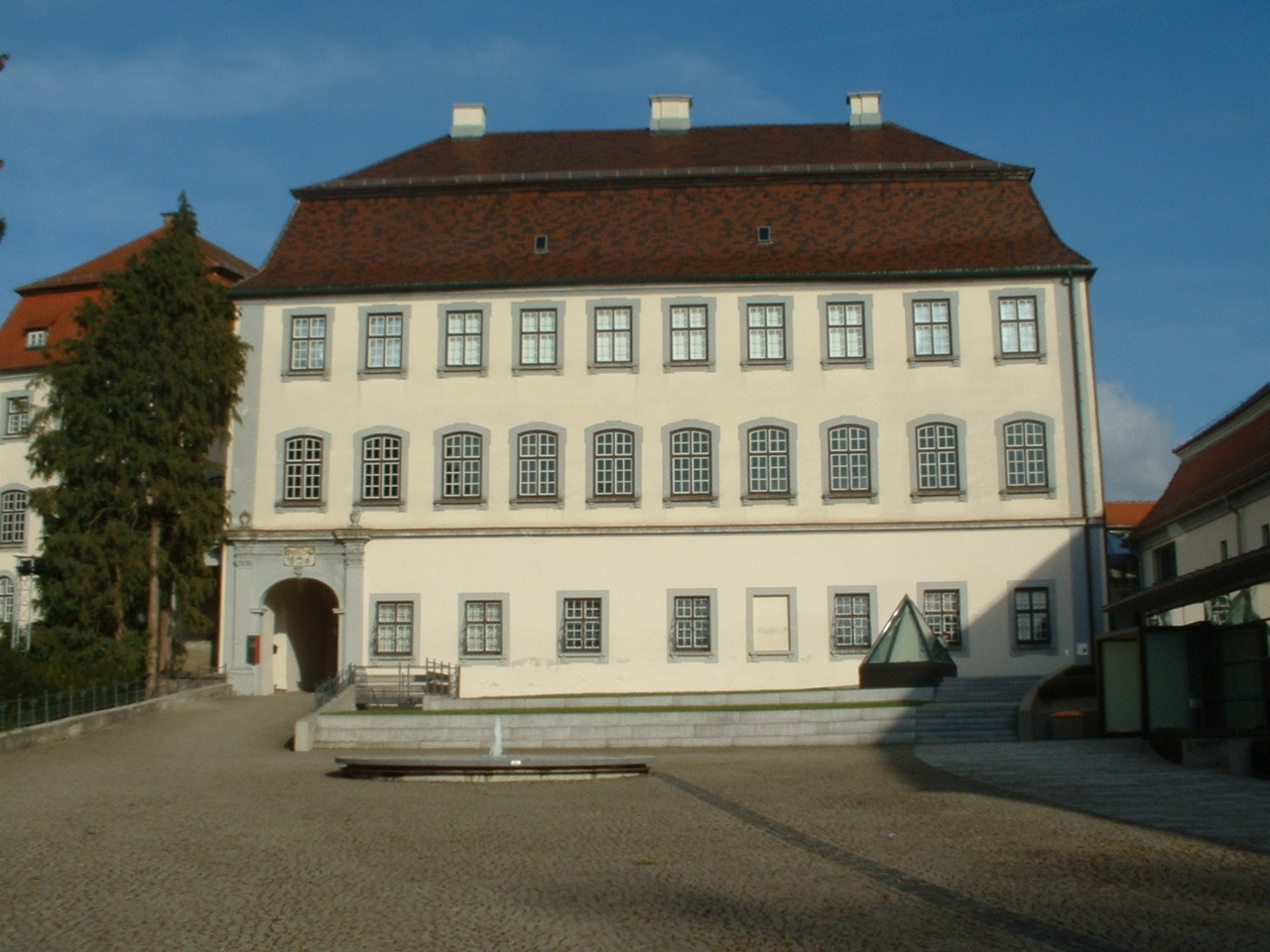
Großlaupheim Castle

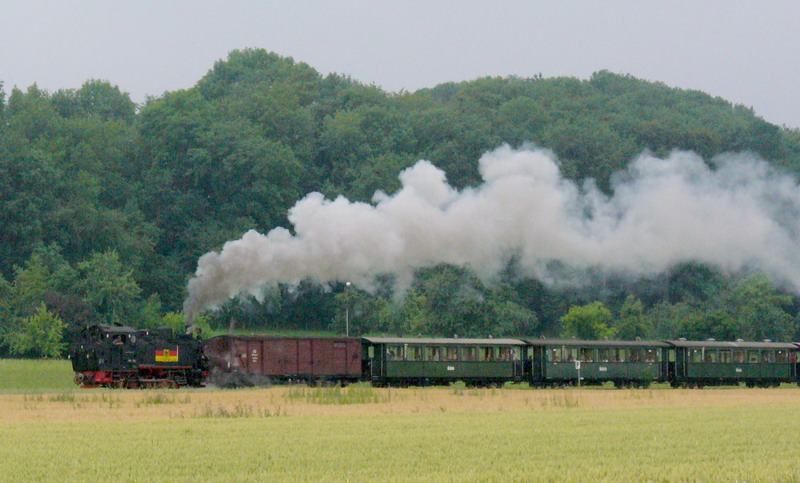
Narrow-gauge railway "Öchsle"

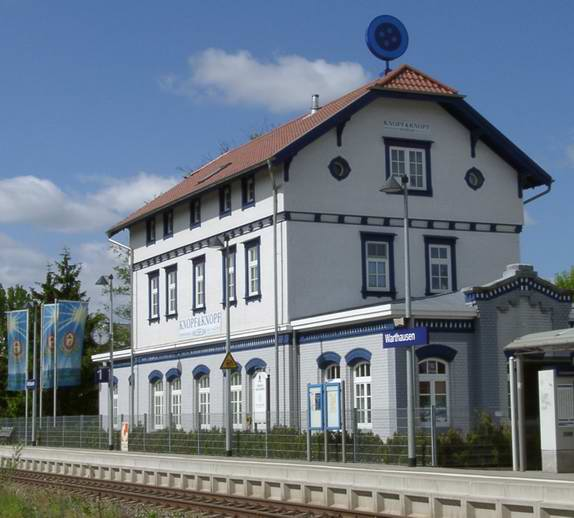
Old train station Warthausen

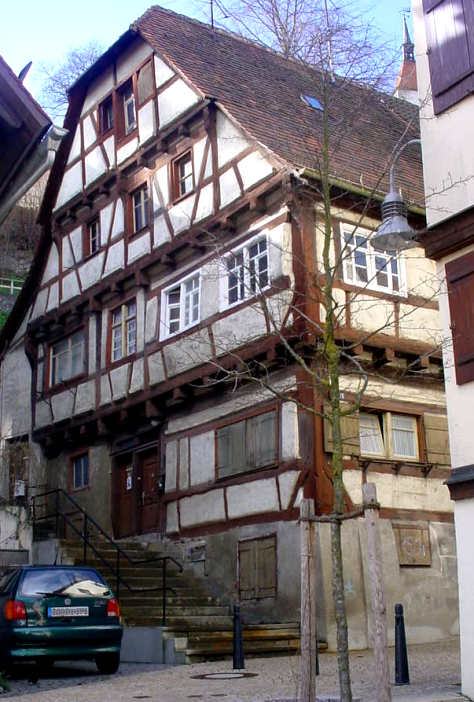
House in "Weavers Lane", Biberach

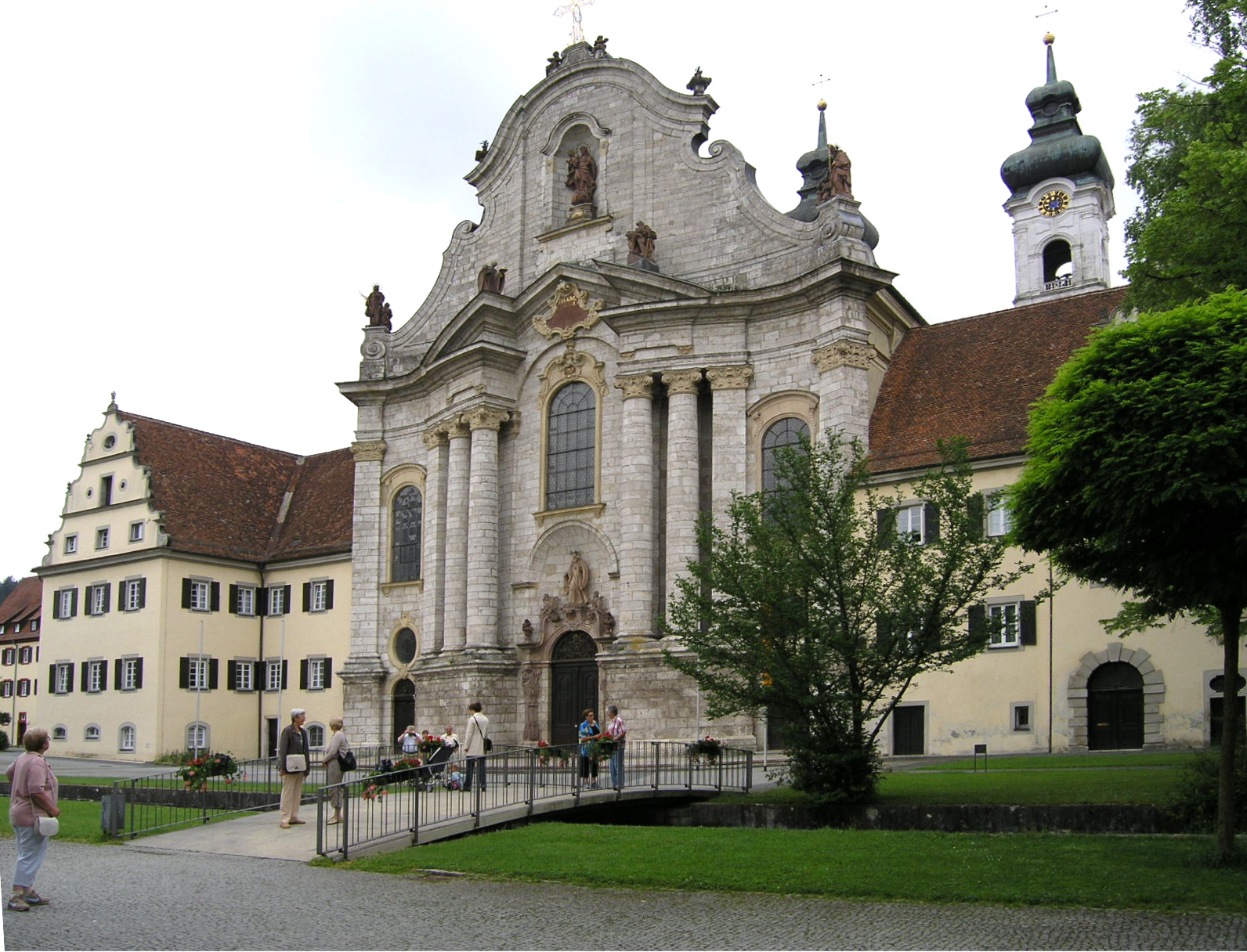
Former Imperial Zwiefalten Abbey

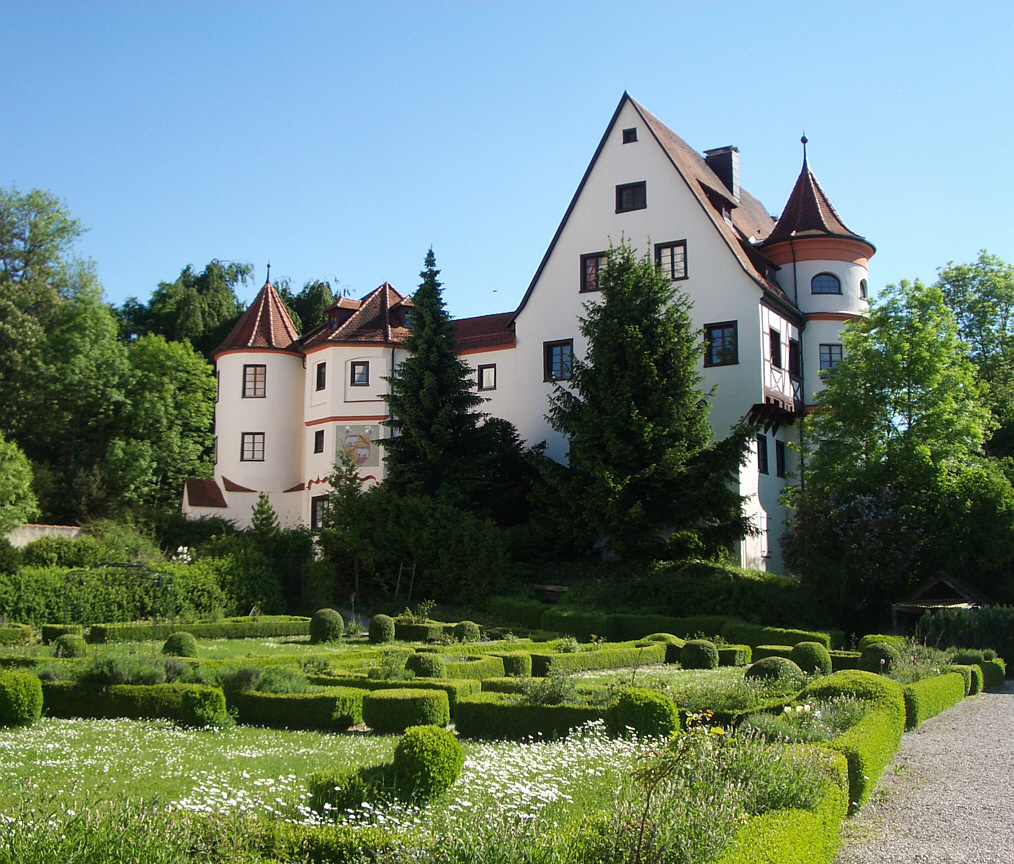
Neufra Castle

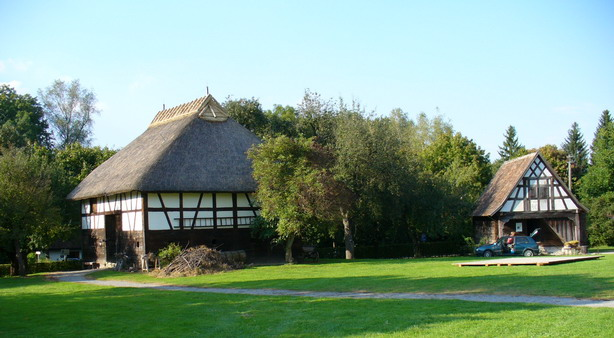
Open-air museum Kürnbach in Bad Schussenried

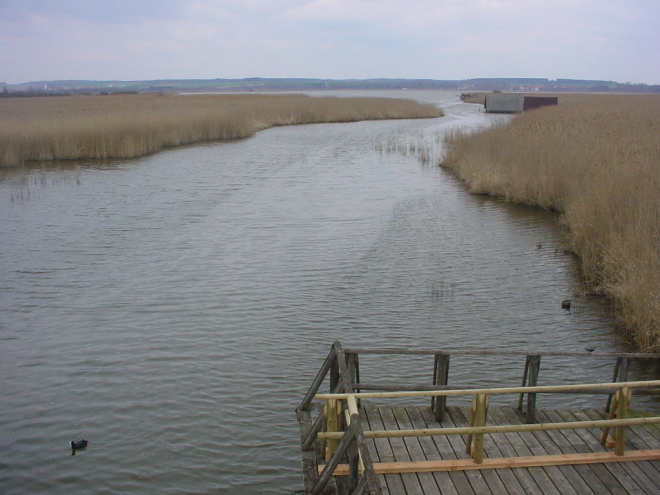
Federsee

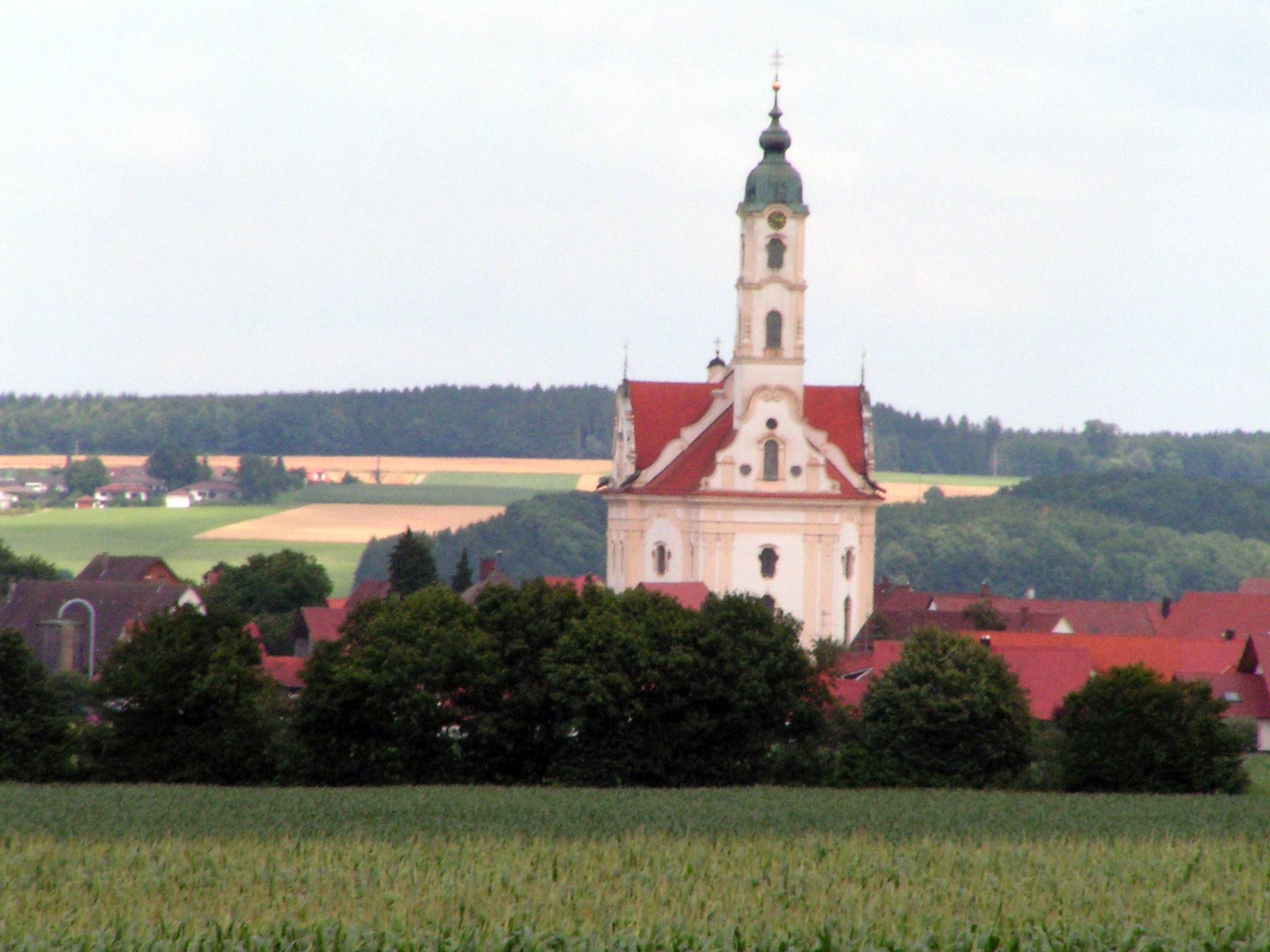
Parish church Steinhausen

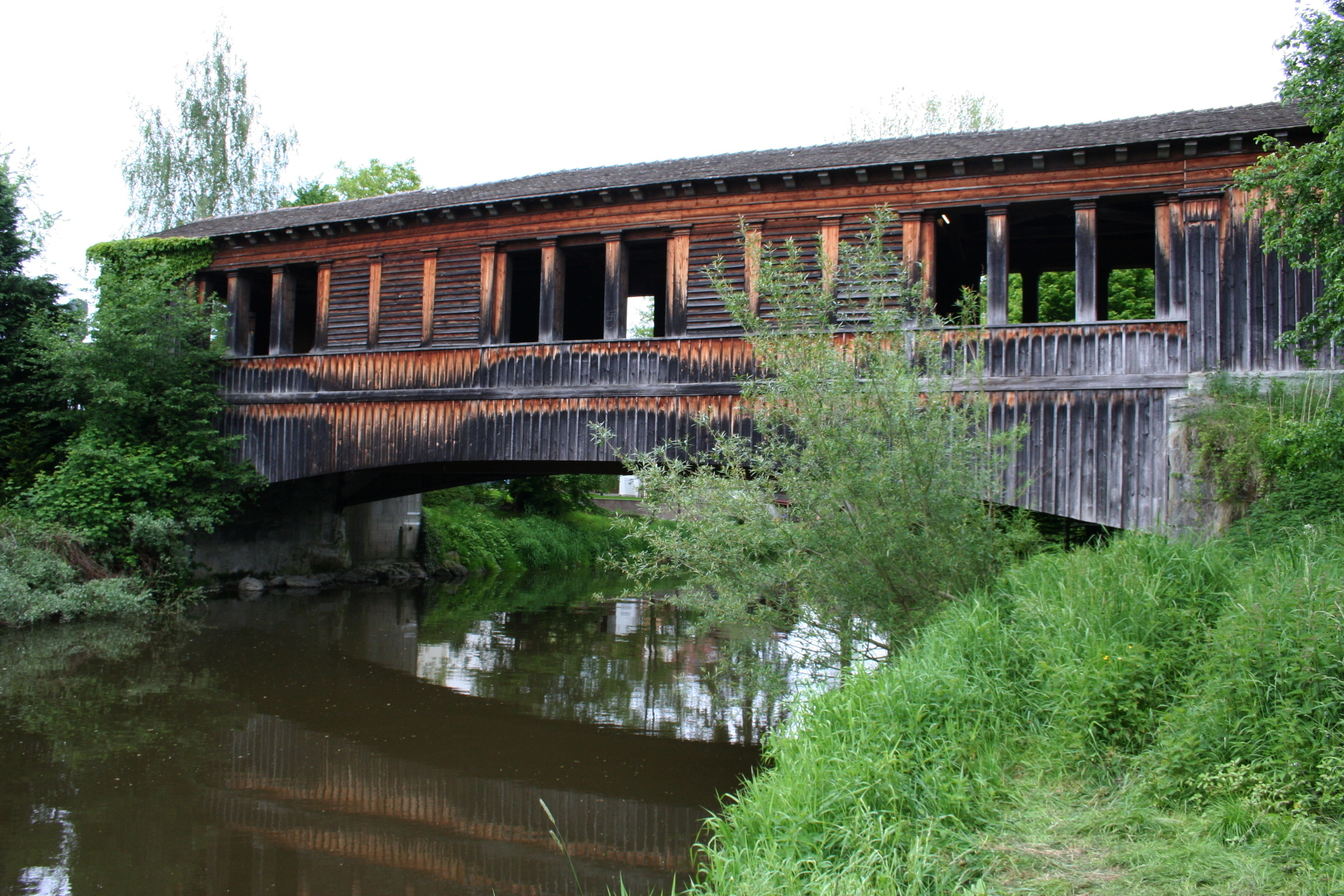
Wooden bridge over the Schussen near Eriskirch

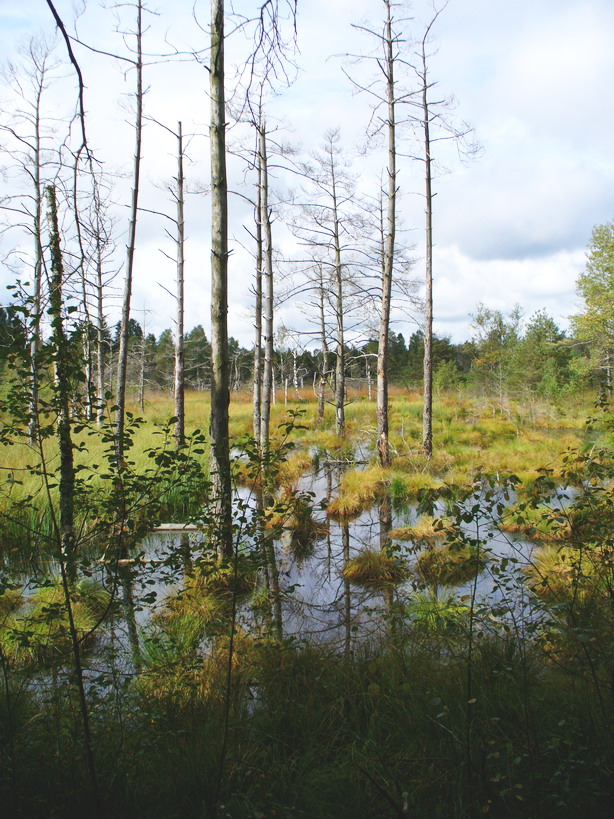
Bog near Bad Wurzach

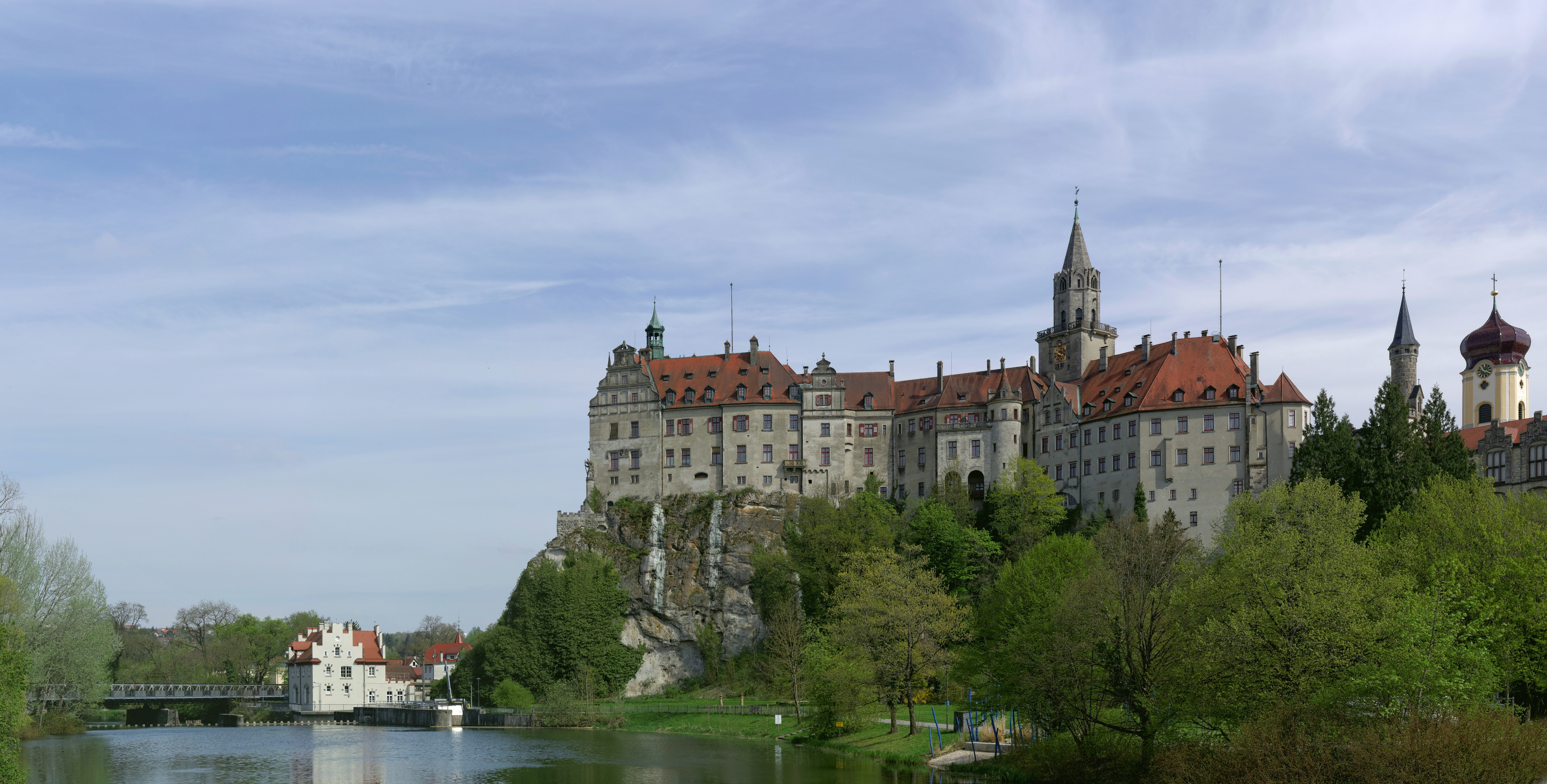
Sigmaringen Castle

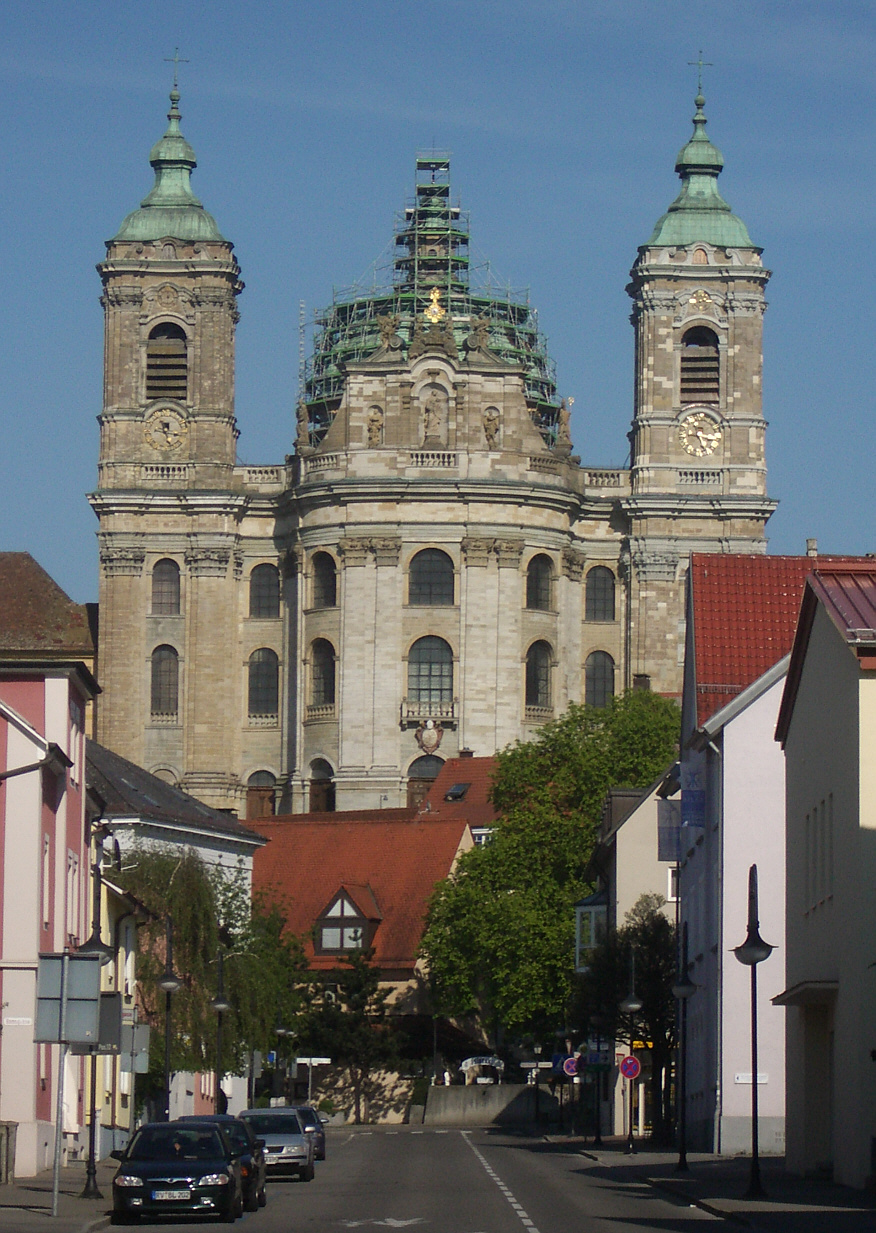
Basilica in Weingarten

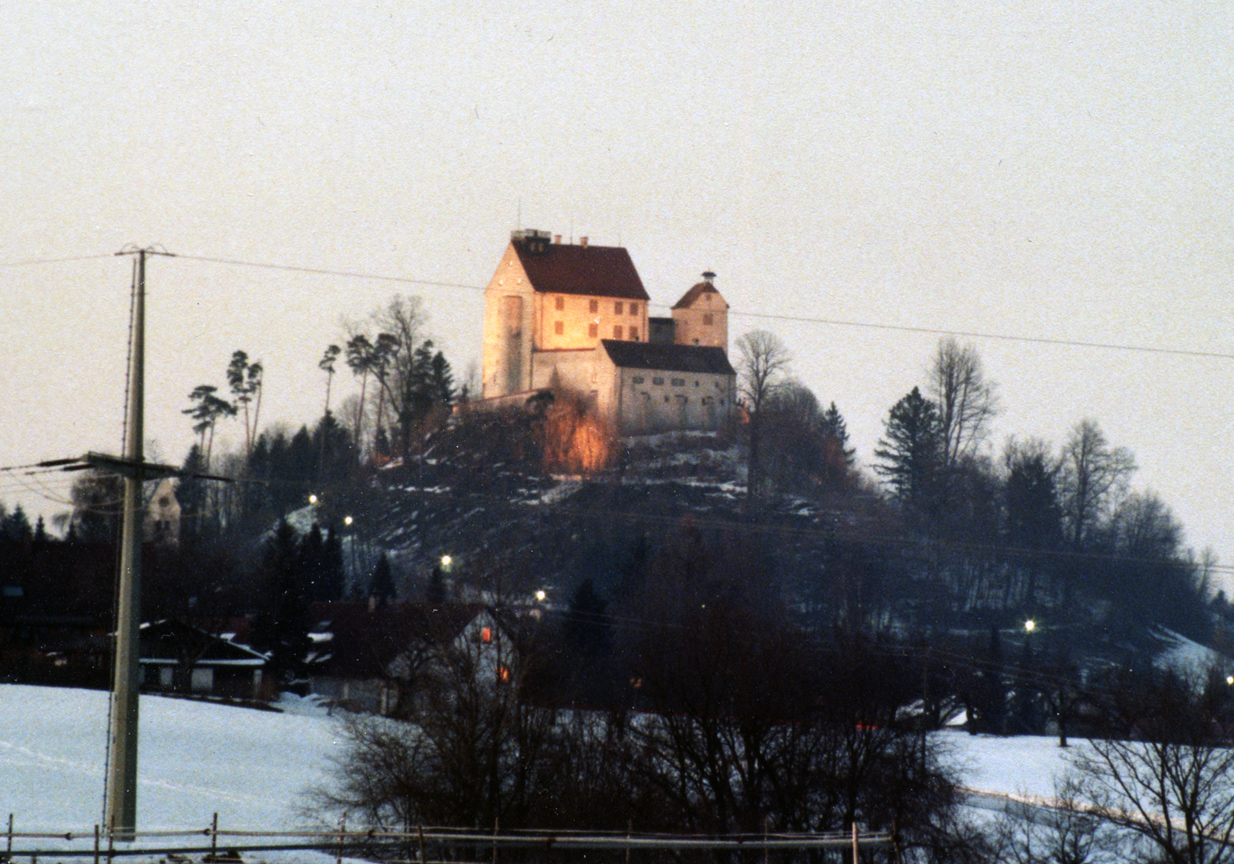
Waldburg Castle

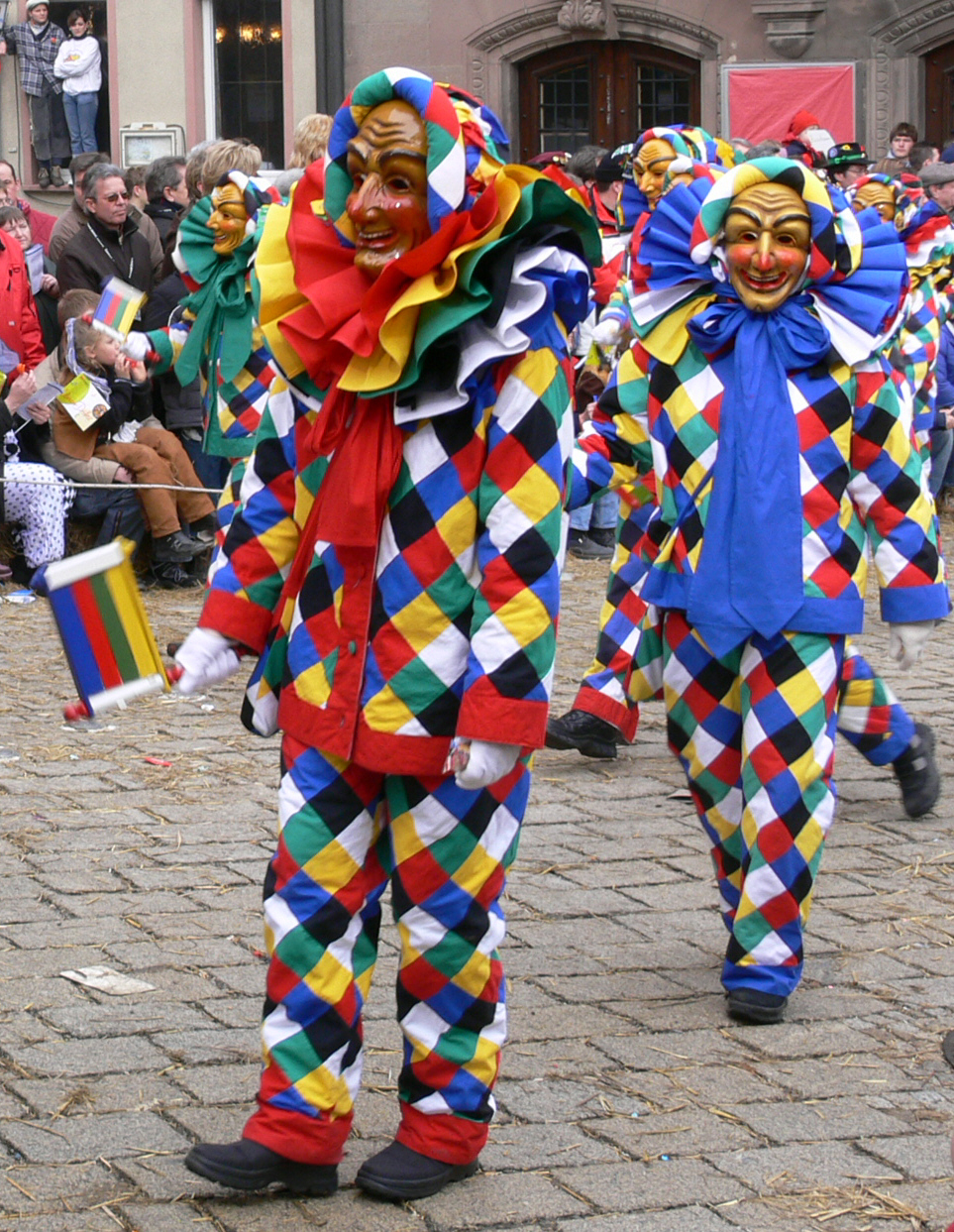
Carnival group from Tettnang

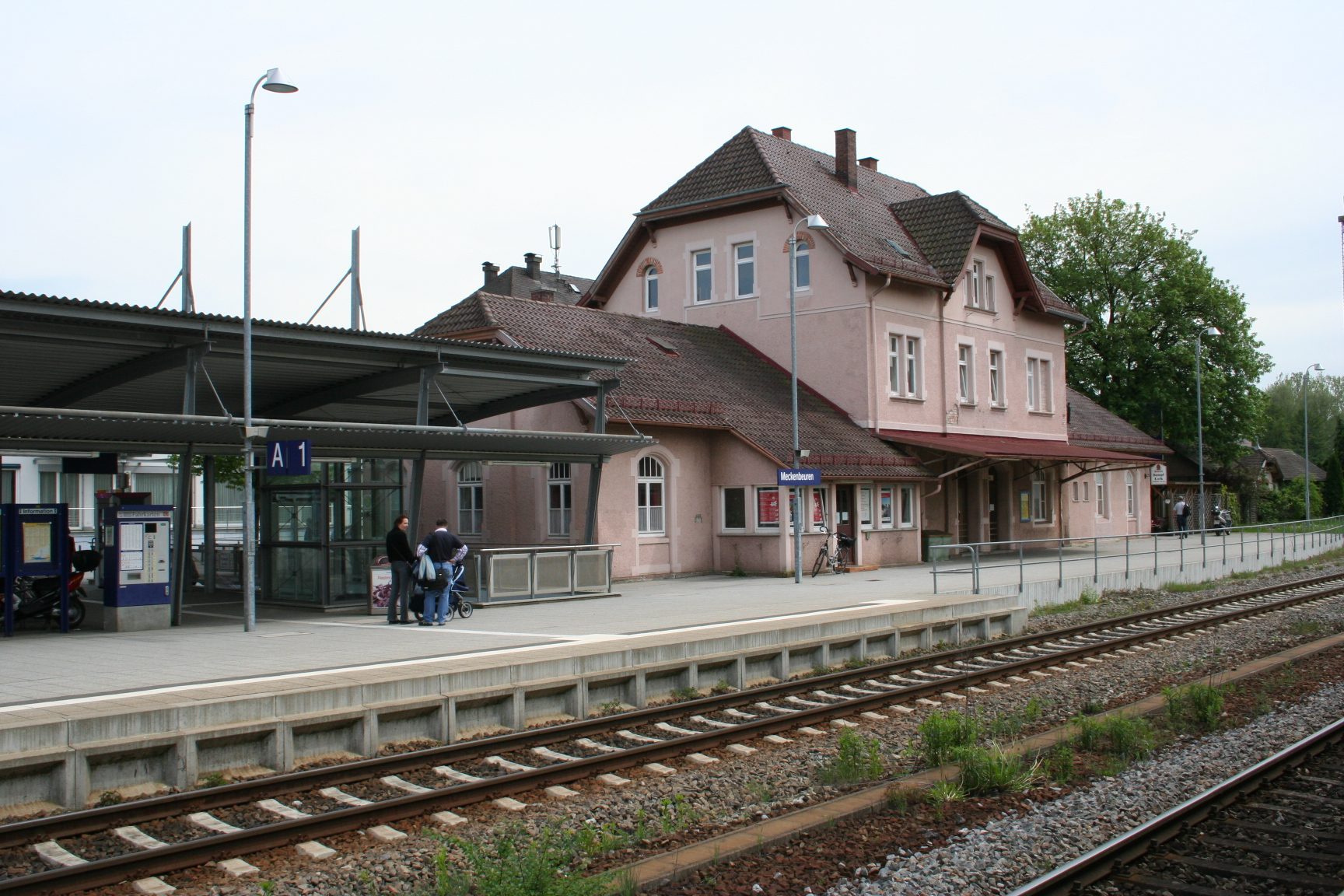
Train Station Meckenbeuren

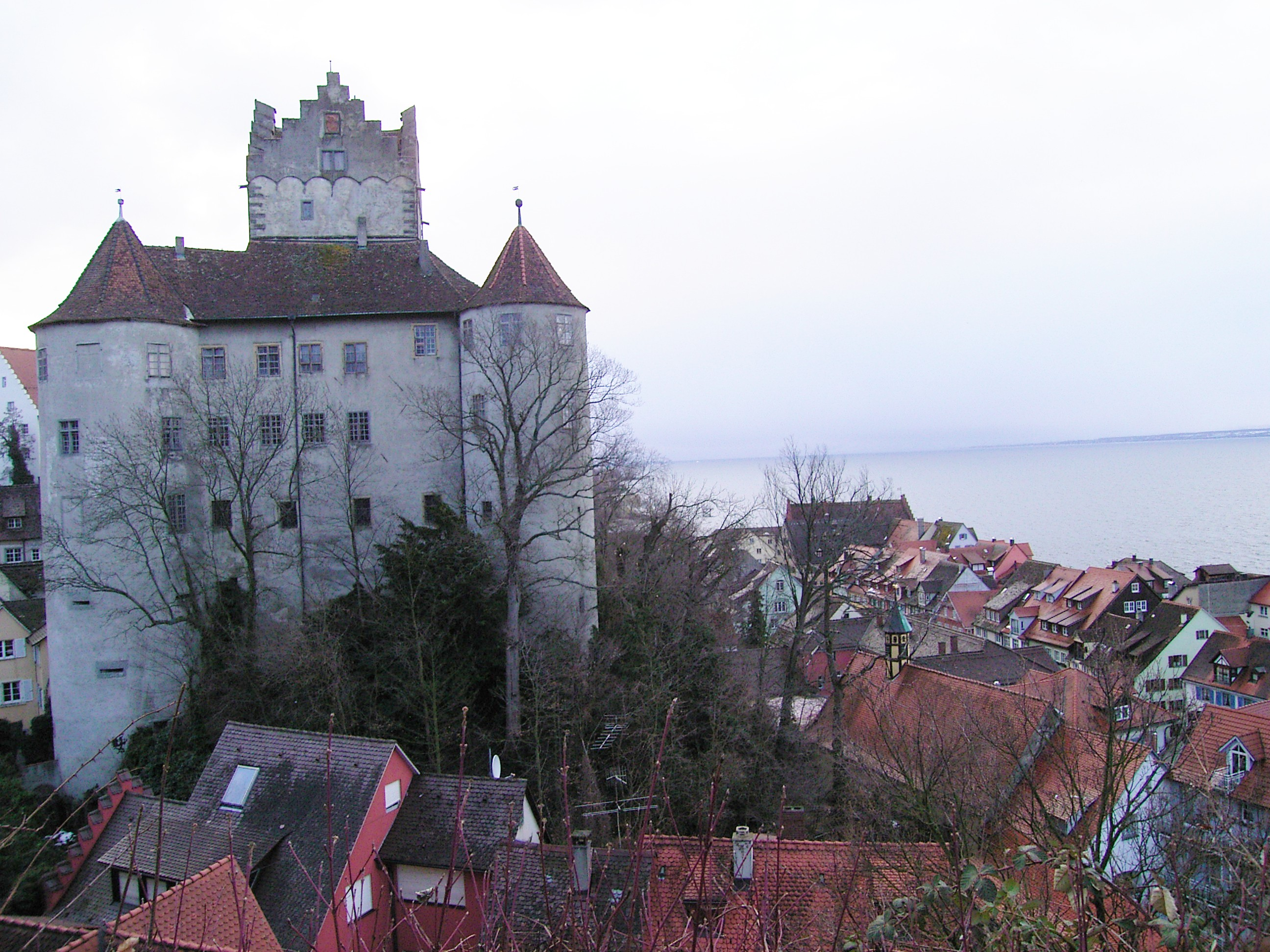
Meersburg Castle on Lake Constance

== See also ==
- Baden-Württemberg
- Swabian children
- Swabia region
- Upper Swabian Baroque Route
