= Marienau Charterhouse =

Monastery in Baden-Württemberg, Germany

Coordinates: 47°54′22″N 9°59′58″E

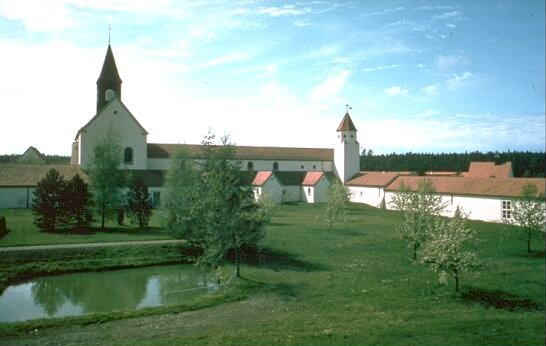
Marienau Charterhouse

Marienau Charterhouse (Kartause Marienau) is a Carthusian monastery, or charterhouse, the successor to the Maria Hain Charterhouse in Düsseldorf, located since 1964 in Marienau, a part of Bad Wurzach, district of Ravensburg in Baden-Württemberg. It is the only extant Carthusian monastery in Germany.

== Maria Hain ==
The former Schloss Hain in Düsseldorf-Unterrath was established under the name of Kartause Maria Hain (Maria Hain Charterhouse) as a Carthusian monastery in 1869, where despite the threats of the Kulturkampf in the 1880s and of World War II, it survived until 1964, when the site was required for the expansion of Düsseldorf Airport and the monks were forced to leave.

== Marienau ==
Marienau Charterhouse was established in 1964 in Talacker near Bad Wurzach, Baden-Württemberg, as a replacement for Maria Hain. Its secluded woodland location acts to keep it apart from the world, and the monastery is not open to general visitors.

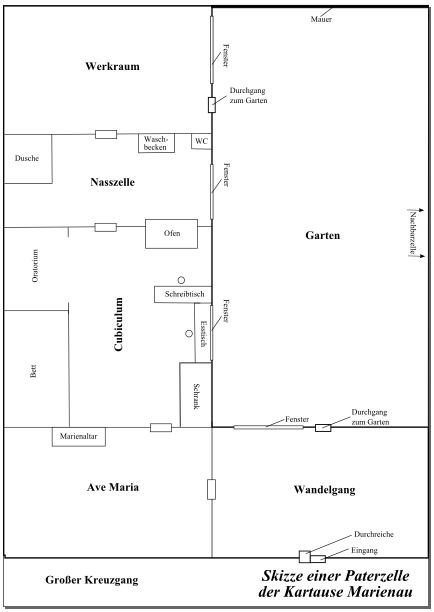
Sketch of a father's cell in Marienau Charterhouse

It was built between 1962 and 1964 to designs by the architects Emil Steffann and Gisberth M. Hülsmann.

Marienau is a "double charterhouse", that is, it has hermitages for 24 monks, rather than the usual 12. The buildings, as specifically required by the Carthusian order through Pater Marianus Marck, fall into five clearly defined areas:

1. The central "small" cloister
2. The "great" cloister
3. The brothers' building
4. The workshops and farmhouse
5. The gatehouse and guesthouse

The buildings round the great cloister are single-storied, while the remainder are two-storied. All are of simple brick construction with ceilings of wooden beams and red tiled roofs. The outside walls are painted yellow. The perimeter wall encloses the entire precinct, with a height of some 2.5 metres and a total length of about 1.2 kilometres, with three gates.

At the centre point of the enclosed area, amounting to about 10 hectares, is the simple church. Enclosed within the monastery complex is the graveyard. Carthusians are traditionally buried in their robes without a coffin, on a board; the only monument is a simple wooden cross without a name. The graveyard also contains a large wooden cross under which are buried the bones of the dead from Maria Hain, which were moved to the new charterhouse in 1964 with the rest of the community.

== Sources and external links ==
- Carthusian Order website: photos of Marienau Charterhouse
