= Lower Swabia =

Region in Germany in the federal state of Baden-Württemberg

Lower Swabia (German: Niederschwaben, Unterschwaben or Schwäbisches Unterland) is a region in Germany in the federal state of Baden-Württemberg. The name, which refers to medieval Swabia, is applied to the region around Heilbronn. The exact geographical location of this area has not been strictly defined. However, most of the area is situated in the North of Baden-Württemberg, and includes some of the Neckar river valley. Its counterpart is Upper Swabia (Oberschwaben), which lies directly to the South by lake Constance and the Swabian Alb.
