= Bundesstraße 465 =

Federal highway in Germany

B 465
- Bundesstraße 465
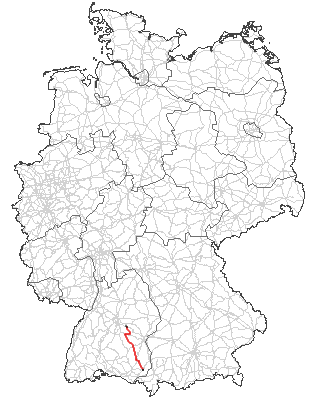

Route information
- Length: 110 km (68 mi)

Major junctions
- North end: Kirchheim unter Teck
- South end: Leutkirch im Allgäu

Location
- Country: Germany
- States: Baden-Württemberg

Highway system
- Roads in Germany; Autobahns; List; Federal; List; State; E-roads

The Bundesstraße 465 (abbreviation: B 465) leads from Kirchheim (Teck) to Leutkirch Allgäu.

== History ==
Today's Bundesstraße 465 is formed from three former Württemberg state roads:

- The northern stretch to Römerstein was part of Württemberg state road no. 45, led from Plochingen over Kirchheim (Teck) and Blaubeuren to Ulm.
- The middle stretch from Bad Urach was part of Württemberg state road 43 , and led from Stuttgart over Urach, Münsingen and Ehingen to Biberach an der Riss. This road was according to the Description of the Oberamt Ehingen created in 1810.
- The southern part led as Württemberg state road 54. from the railway station in Unteressendorf to Bad Wurzach and Leutkirch im Allgäu and finally to Isny.

The Bundesstraße 465 was established in the early 1960s.

== Places served ==
The Bundesstraße 465 passes the following municipalities

- Dettingen unter Teck
- Owen

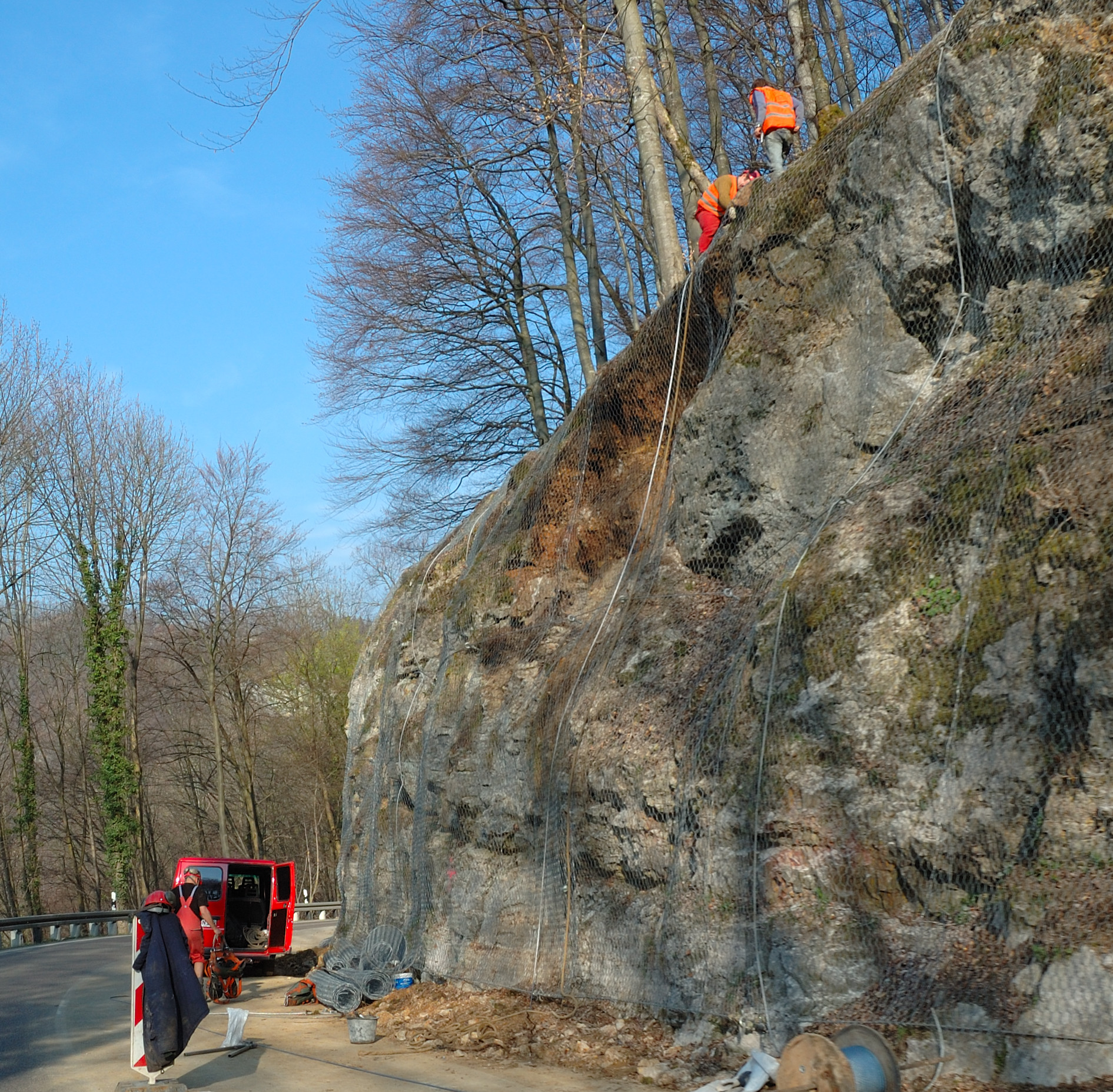
Rock fixing between Lenningen and Römerstein (2007)

- Lenningen
- Römerstein
- Bad Urach
- Münsingen
- Ehingen
- Schemmerhofen
- Warthausen
- Biberach an der Riß
- Eberhardzell-Oberessendorf
- Bad Wurzach
- Leutkirch im Allgäu
