= Dietmanns =

- Municipality
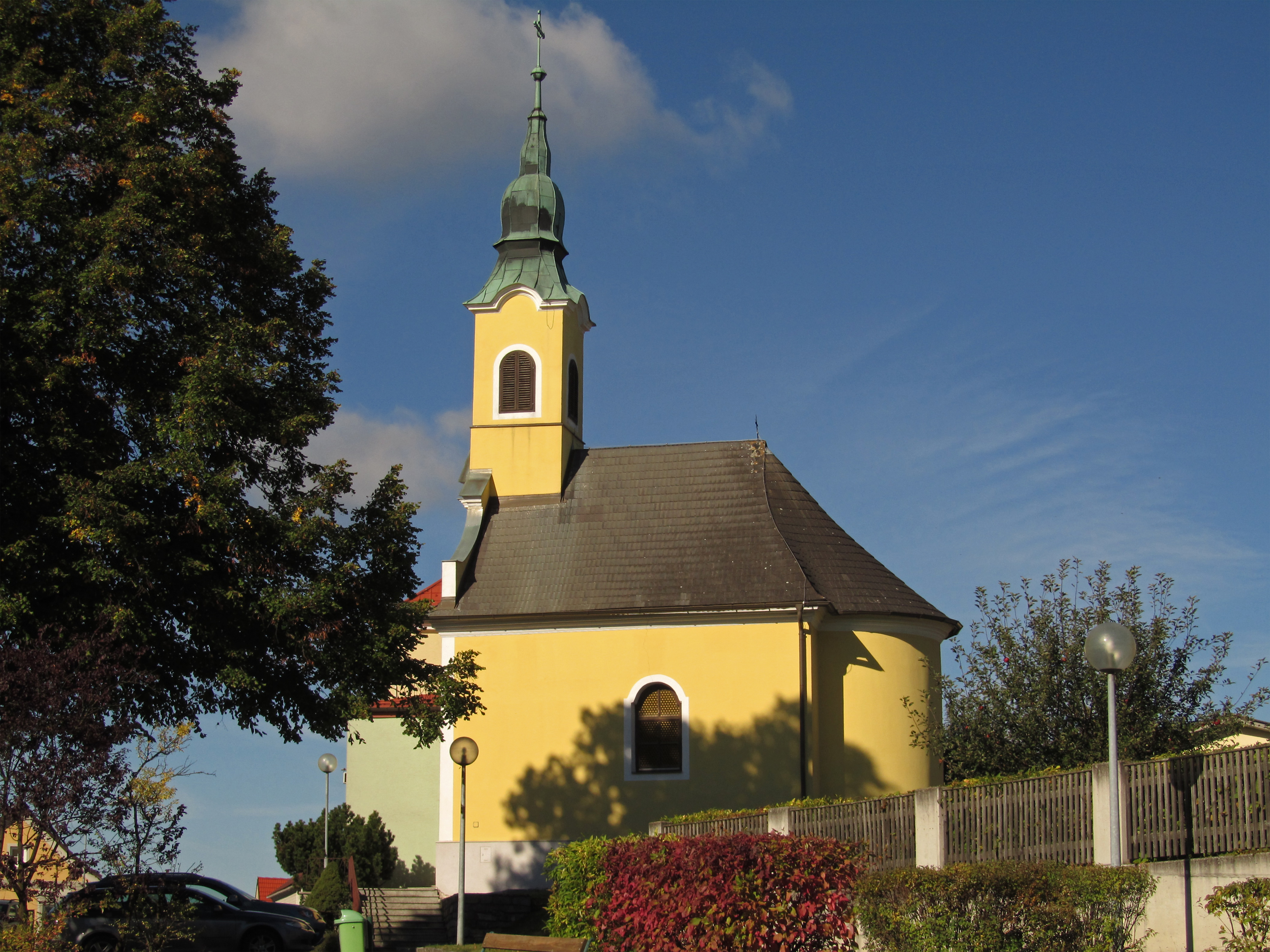
- Dietmanns chapel

- Coat of arms

- Location within Austria
- Coordinates: 48°47′00″N 15°22′00″E
- Country: Austria
- State: Lower Austria
- District: Waidhofen an der Thaya

Government
  - Mayor: Harald Hofbauer (SPÖ)

Area
  - Total: 6.87 km^{2} (2.65 sq mi)
- Elevation: 622 m (2,041 ft)

Population (2018-01-01)
  - Total: 1,063
  - Density: 155/km^{2} (401/sq mi)
- Time zone: UTC+1 (CET)
  - Summer (DST): UTC+2 (CEST)
- Postal code: 3813
- Area code: 02847
- Vehicle registration: WT
- Website: https://www.dietmanns.at/

Dietmanns is a municipality in the region Waldviertel district of Waidhofen an der Thaya in the Austrian state of Lower Austria.

== Population ==
Historical population
Year	Pop.	±%
1971	1,316	—
1981	1,262	−4.1%
1991	1,202	−4.8%
2001	1,243	+3.4%
