= Collaborative Research Center =

Building on the Rockefeller University campus in Manhattan, New York, U.S.

Coordinates: 40°45′47″N 73°57′16″W

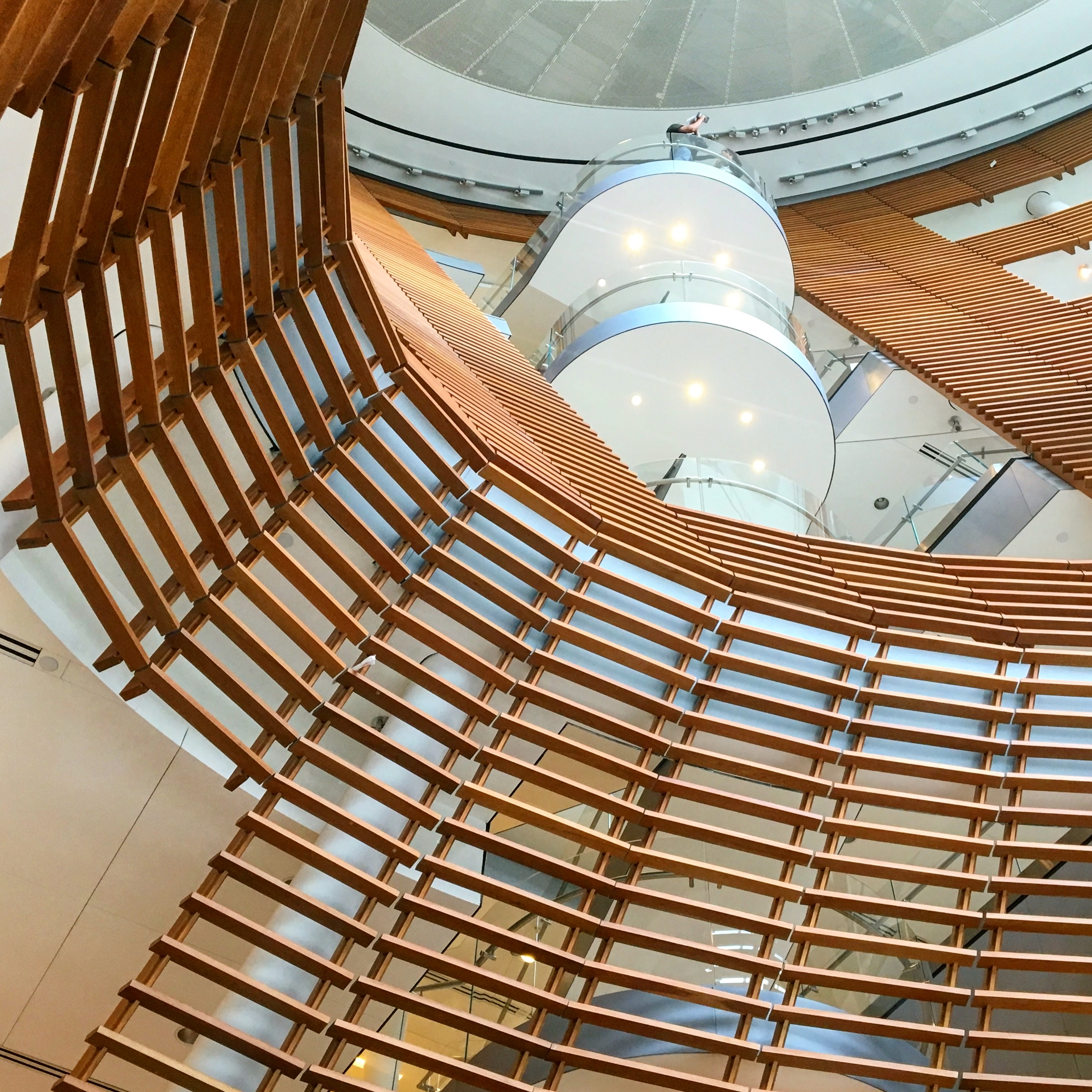
- Interior detail, 2017
- Location: New York City, United States
- Affiliations: Rockefeller University
- Location within Manhattan

The Collaborative Research Center is a building on the Rockefeller University campus in New York City. Construction began in 2007, funded by a $50 million from the Starr Foundation.
