= Wachbühl =

Mountain in Baden-Württemberg, Germany

Coordinates: 47°52′N 9°58′E

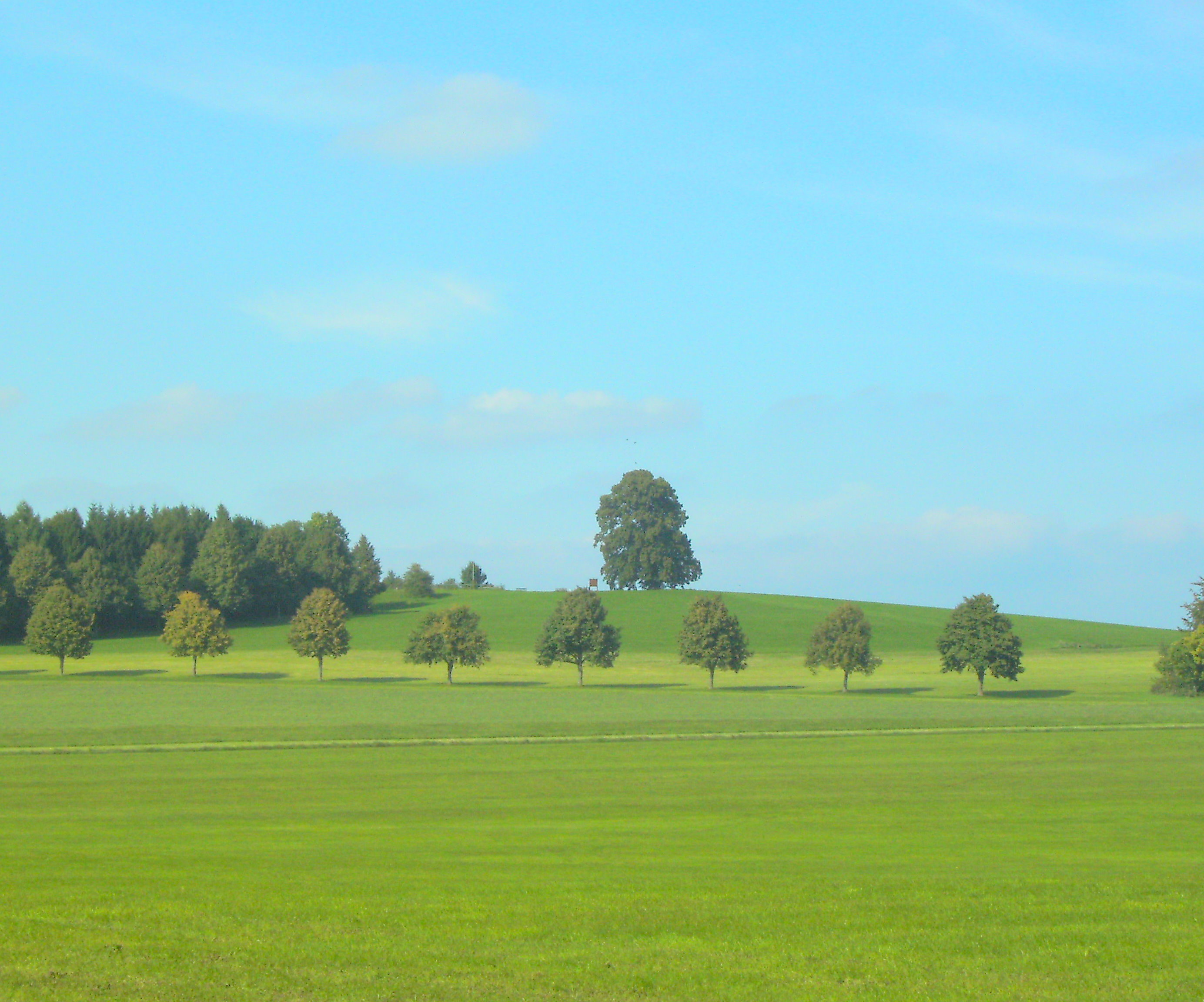
- Wachbühl.

Highest point
- Elevation: 791 m (2,595 ft)
- Prominence: 142 m (466 ft)
- Parent peak: mountain P.815 southeast of Beuren (Isny im Allgäu)
- Isolation: 13.84 km (8.60 mi) to P.795

Geography
- Location: Baden-Württemberg, Germany

Wachbühl is a mountain of Baden-Württemberg, Germany.
