= Eberhardzell =

- Municipality
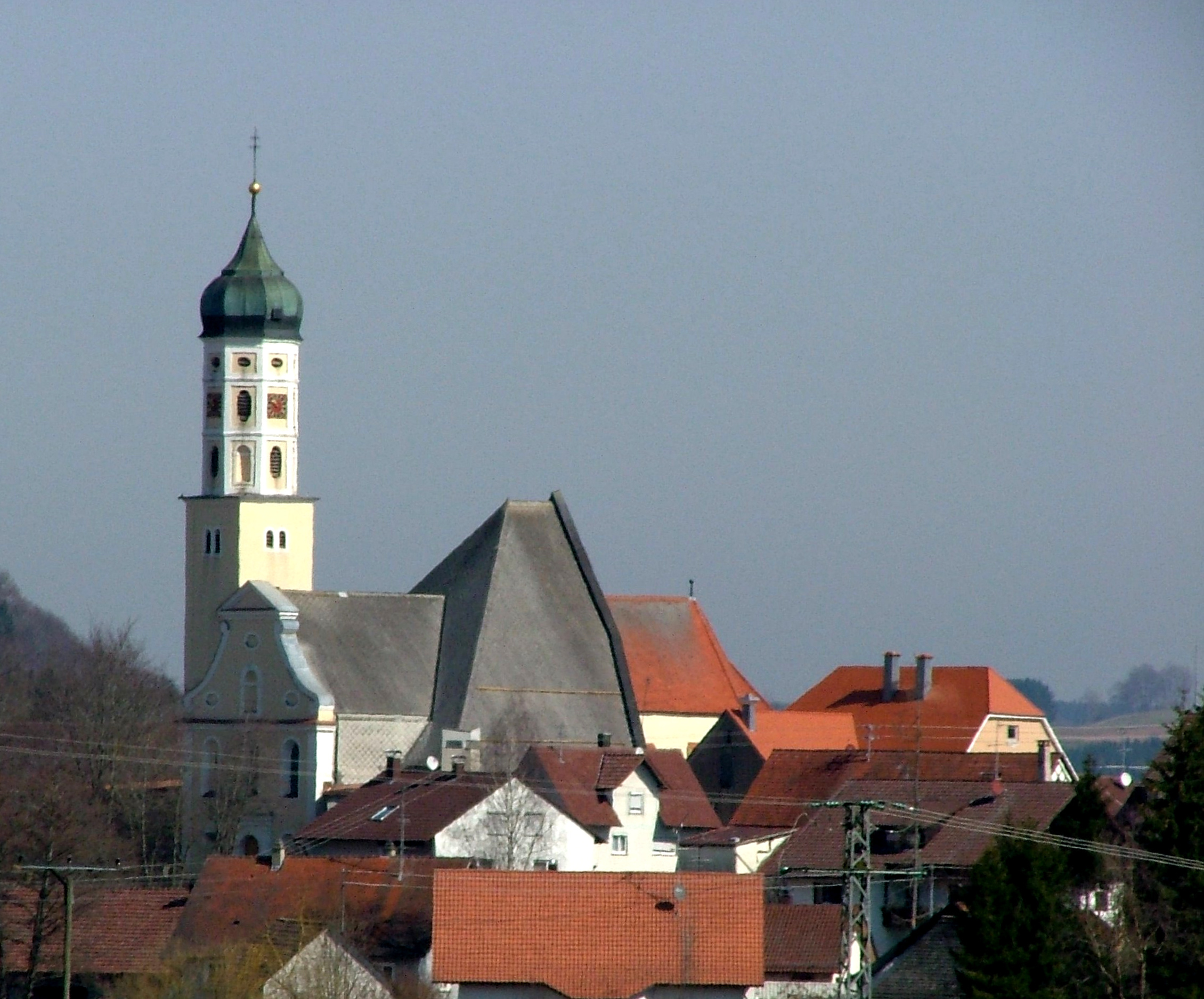
- Church of Saint Mary

- Coat of arms

- Location of Eberhardzell within Biberach district
- Interactive map of Eberhardzell
- Location within Germany Location within Baden-Württemberg
- Coordinates: 48°0′4″N 9°49′27″E
- Country: Germany
- State: Baden-Württemberg
- Admin. region: Tübingen
- District: Biberach

Government
  - Mayor (2023–31): Guntram Grabherr

Area
  - Total: 59.72 km^{2} (23.06 sq mi)
- Elevation: 588 m (1,929 ft)

Population (2025-12-31)
  - Total: 4,555
  - Density: 76.27/km^{2} (197.5/sq mi)
- Time zone: UTC+01:00 (CET)
  - Summer (DST): UTC+02:00 (CEST)
- Postal codes: 88436
- Dialling codes: 07358
- Vehicle registration: BC
- Website: www.eberhardzell.de

Eberhardzell (German pronunciation: [ˈeːbɐhaʁttsɛl]) is a municipality in the district of Biberach in Baden-Württemberg in Germany.

== Culture and Attractions ==
- Parish church St. Maria
- Clergy house
- Ratusz from 1746
- Castle Heinrichsburg

== Notable people ==
- Gebhard Müller (1900-1990), German politician (CDU)
