= Zick =

Zick may refer to:

Surname

- A family of German artists:
  - Johann Martin Zick (1684–1753)
  - Johann Zick (1702–1762)
  - Januarius Johann Rasso Zick (1730–1797)
  - Carl Zick (fl. c. 1808)
  - Conrad Zick (1773–1836)
  - Gustav Zick(1809–1886)
  - Alexander Zick (1845–1907)
- Bob Zick (1927–2017), American baseball player
- Rolf Zick (1921–2024), German journalist

Nickname

- Zick, nickname for Isaac
- Zick Rubin (born 1944), American psychologist and lawyer

Fiction

- Ezekiel Zick, character from the comic book and animated series, Monster Allergy

== See also ==
- Zicker (disambiguation)
- Zickhusen
