= Johannes Zick =

German painter

- Born: 10 January 1702
- Died: 4 March 1762 (aged 60)
- Other name: Johann Zick
- Known for: Painting
- Children: Januarius Zick
- Relatives: Konrad Zick (grandson), Gustav Zick (gread grandson), Alexander Zick (Great great grandson)

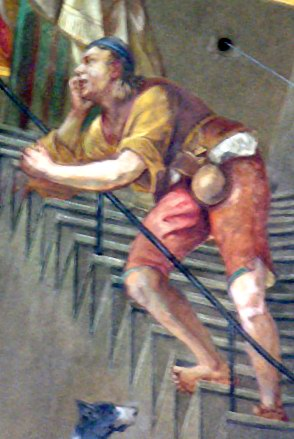
Self-Portrait, part of the ceiling fresco in St. Martin's Church in Biberach an der Riß, by Johannes Zick (1748)

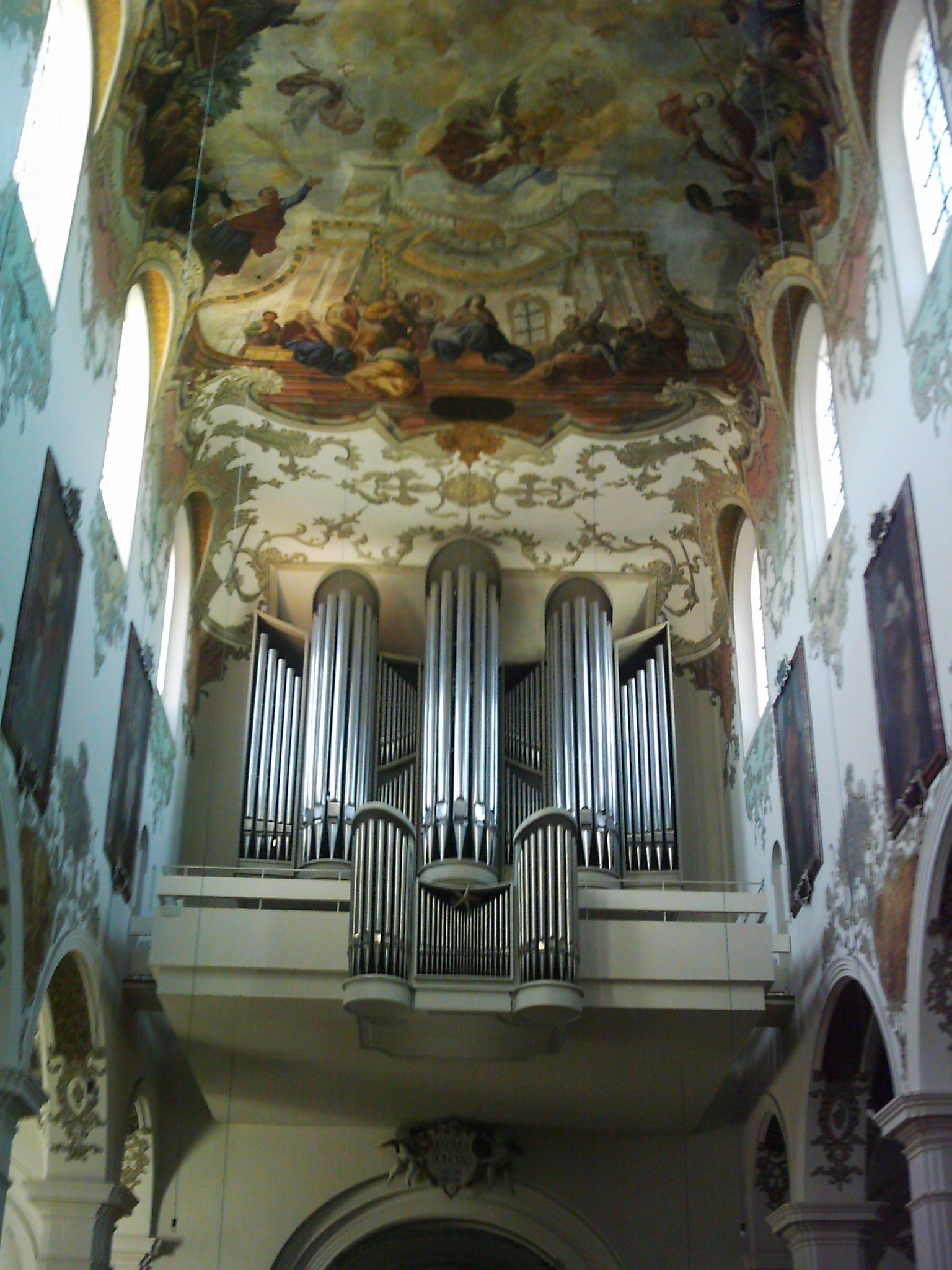
Ceiling in St Martin's Church, Biberach an der Riß

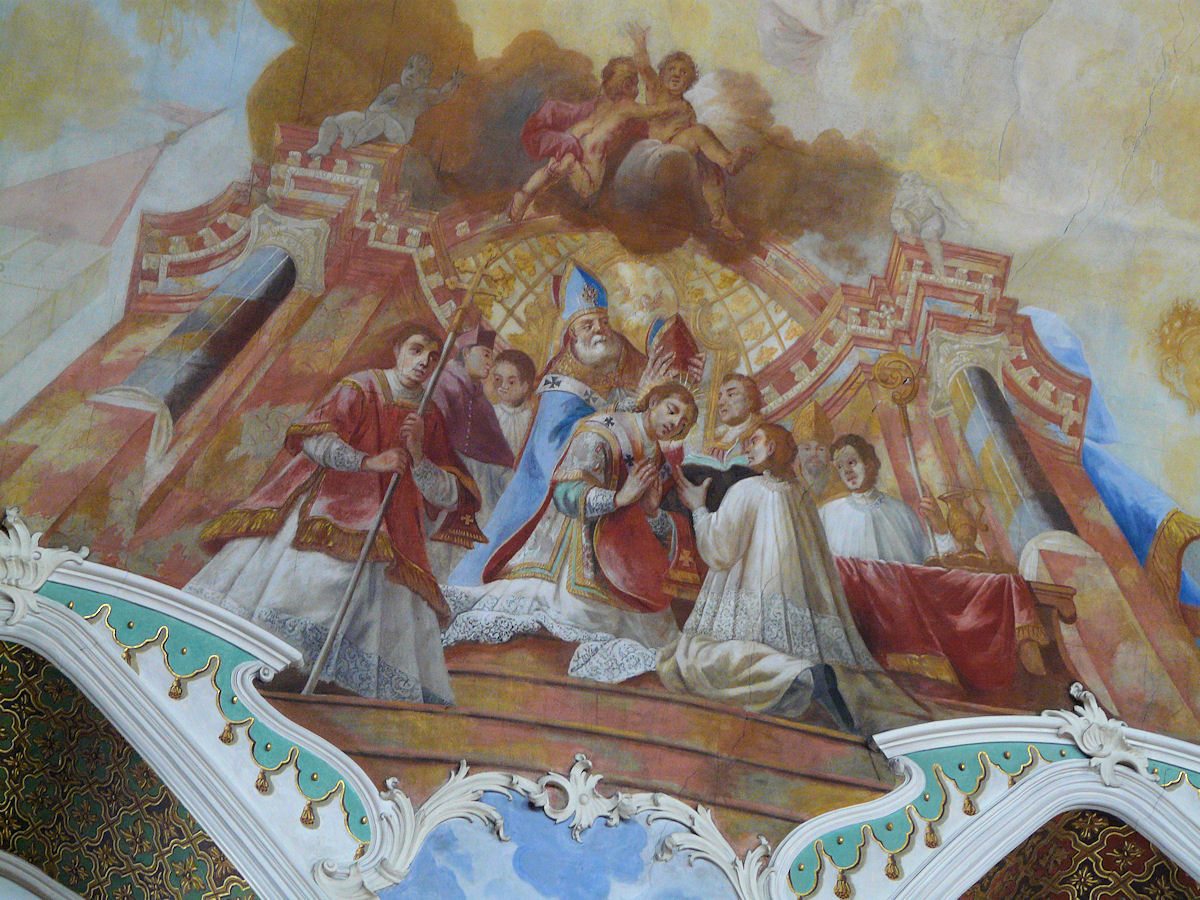
Fresco by in the Church of St. Magnus in Bad Schussenried.

Johannes (Johann) Zick (10 January 1702 – 4 March 1762) was a German painter of frescoes in southern Germany and active during the Baroque period. He was the father of painter Januarius Zick and considered to be an important master of the Late Baroque.

== Life ==
Johannes Zick was born in 1702 in Lachen, part of the territory of the Prince-Abbot of Kempten in the Unterallgäu in modern-day Bavaria, where he started his career as a blacksmith in his father's workshop. From 1721 to 1724, he was apprenticed to the Konstanz court painter Jacob Carl Stauder. They both painted the frescoes on the ceiling of the church Mariahilf in Munich.

Zick moved with his family to Munich in 1728 where he was appointed court painter to Prince Bishop Duke Johann Theodor of Bavaria. Johannes Zick's further development as a painter of frescoes was stimulated by the Asam brothers, who were active in Munich at the time.

Johannes Zick worked extensively in Upper Swabia between 1744 and 1749. Due to his employment in Upper Swabia, his family followed him there in 1746, living either in Schussenried or in Biberach an der Riß. In 1746, he painted the frescoes on the ceiling of the central nave in St. Martin's Church in Biberach an der Riß and, following his design, the other naves were reconstructed and painted with frescoes in 1747.

Around 1750, he moved to Würzburg where he painted the frescoes in the so-called garden room at the Würzburg Residence, the dwelling place of the Prince Bishop of Würzburg. For nine years, between 1751 and 1759, he furnished the residence of the Prince Bishops of Speyer in Bruchsal with paintings. Johannes Zick died in Würzburg in 1762.

== Works ==
- 1736 - Decoration of vault and altar in the church of St. John the Baptist, Bergkirchen
- 1737 - Frescoes in Roßacker Chapel, Rosenheim
- 1738/1739 - Frescoes in St. George's church, Raitenhaslach (Burghausen)
- 1740/1742 - Five altarpieces in the collegiate church St. Andrews, Berchtesgaden
- 1745/1746 - Frescoes in the Premonstratensian abbey church St. Magnus, Schussenried
- 1746/1747 - Frescoes and decorations in the church of St. Martin, Biberach an der Riß
- 1749/1750 - Frescoes for the garden-room at the Würzburg Residence
- 1751-1759 - Numerous frescoes at the residence in Bruchsal
- 1753 - Paintings in Amorbach parish church
- 1755 - Paintings in the refectory of Monastery Oberzell near Würzburg
- 1756 - Paintings in the Sandkirche, Aschaffenburg
- 1757 - Paintings in the Grafenrheinfeld parish church

== See also ==
- Upper Swabian Baroque Route
- Zick
