= Simultaneum =

Church with worship by two or more religious groups

A shared church (German: Simultankirche), simultaneum mixtum, a term coined in 16th-century Germany, is a church in which public worship is conducted by adherents of two or more religious groups. Such churches became common in the German-speaking lands of Europe in the wake of the Protestant Reformation. The different Christian denominations (such as Roman Catholic, Lutheran, Reformed, or United, etc.), share the same church building, although they worship at different times and with different clergy. Simultaneums have been seen as a manifestation of Christian ecumenism.

Simultaneum as a policy was particularly attractive to Christian rulers who ruled over populations which contained considerable numbers of both Catholics and Protestants. It was often the opposite of cuius regio, eius religio and used in situations where a ruler was of a different religion than the majority of the people, and not strong enough to impose his religion on the population. These have been seen as a form of religious toleration.

During the Nine Years' War (1688–1697), Louis XIV of France occupied the Electorate of the Palatinate, a Protestant region situated mainly in the western part of what is today Germany, where he introduced the simultaneum. At the end of the war the region returned to Protestant control, but a last-minute addition to the Treaty of Ryswick provided for a continuation of the simultaneum. Although intended to apply only to the Palatinate, the simultaneum was subsequently also applied in portions of Protestant Alsace (a region ruled by France, but where the Edict of Fontainebleau was not enforced).

== Examples ==
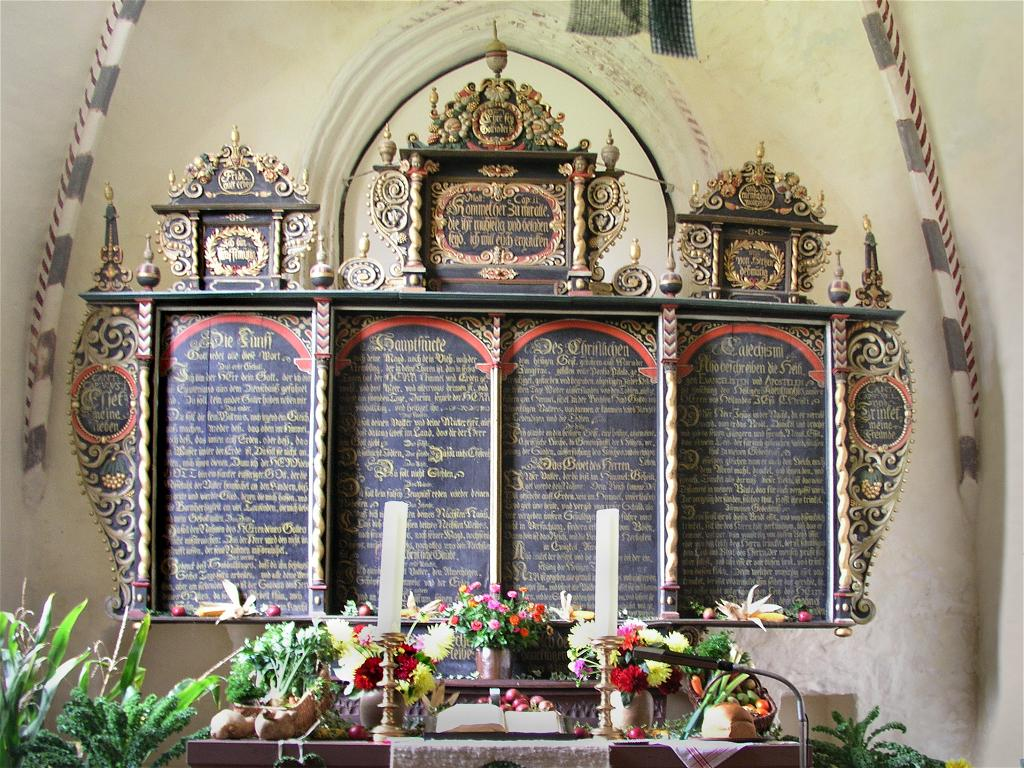
Following the compromise between the Reformed Aniconism and Lutheran Adiaphora in Ringstedt's Reformed-Lutheran simultaneum of St. Fabian there is a Lutheran altar, but it shows no Lutheran crucifix, but only candles, in compromise with Reformed sensibilities.

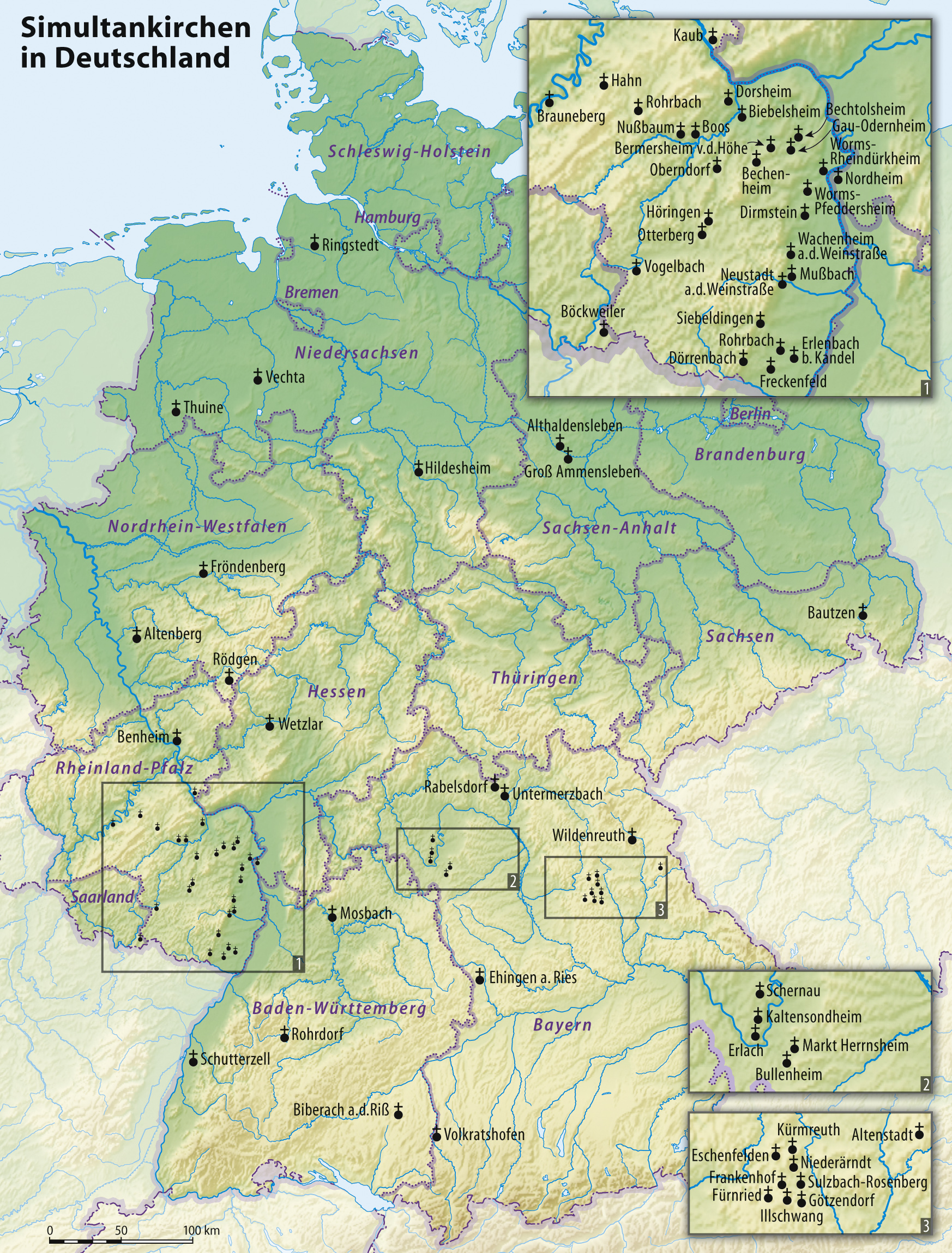
Map of all simultaneum churches in Germany

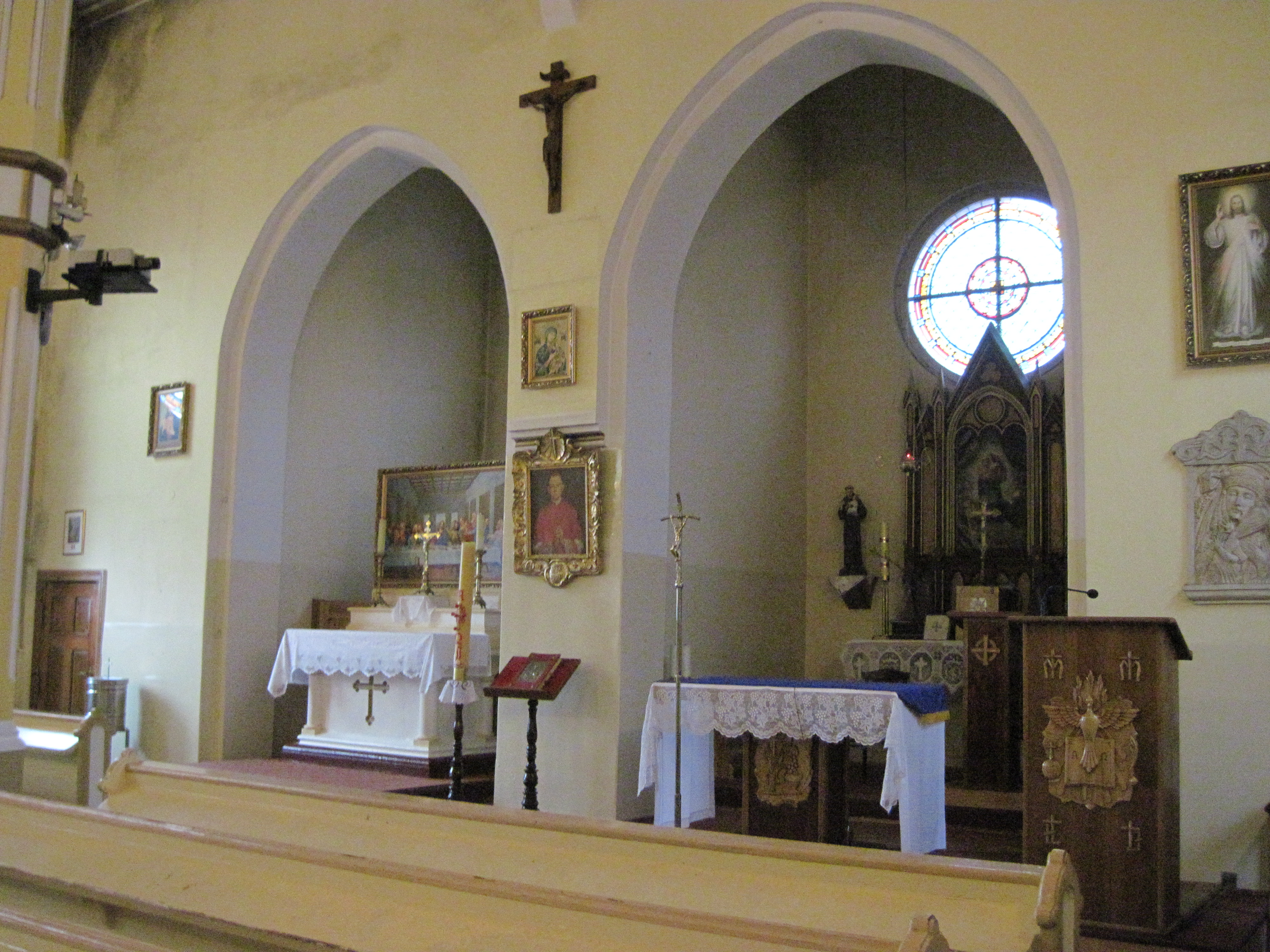
Lutheran and Catholic altars in St. M. Kozal church in Gniezno, Poland

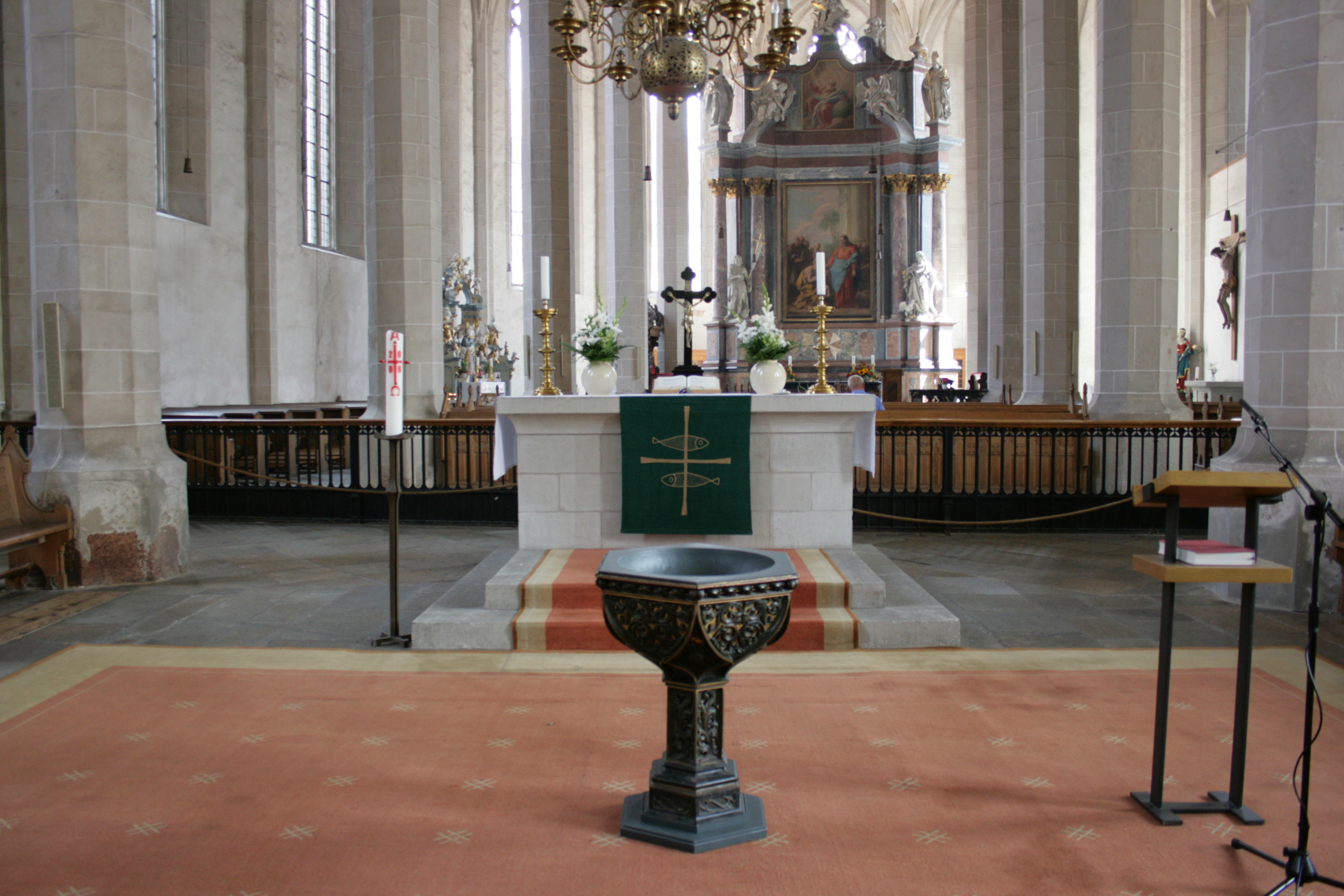
Since 1530, the Cathedral of St Peter in Bautzen has shared by the Catholic Church and the Evangelical-Lutheran Church of Saxony

=== Belgium ===
- Olne, province of Liège; a simultaneum was introduced in 1649

=== France ===
- Béarn - there used to be a simultaneum there between 1561–1569
- Old Saint Peter's Church, Strasbourg, Alsace; now divided into separate Protestant and Catholic churches
- Wissembourg, Alsace: there was a so-called trimultaneum, with a Catholic, Lutheran, and Reformed congregation sharing one church

=== Germany ===
- Altenberg im Bergischen Land, Altenberger Dom, since 1857 Catholic-United simultaneum
- Althaldensleben, Double Church, Catholic-United simultaneum until the present day
- Bautzen, St. Peter's Cathedral, oldest Catholic-Lutheran simultaneum since 1524
- Bechtolsheim, Ss. Mary and Christopher, Catholic-United simultaneum until the present day
- Berlin, French Church of Friedrichstadt, Calvinist-United simultaneum since 1981
- St. Martin's Church, Biberach, Catholic-Lutheran simultaneum until the present day
- Biebelsheim, St. Martin's Church, Catholic-United simultaneum until the present day
- Boos upon Nahe, Simultaneum, Catholic-United simultaneum until the present day
- Brauneberg, St. Remigius Church, Catholic-United simultaneum until the present day
- Braunfels, Castle Church, since 2005 a Catholic-United simultaneum
- Wildenreuth, St. James' Church, Catholic-Lutheran simultaneum until the present day
- Fröndenberg, Collegiate Church, Catholic-United simultaneum until the present day
- Gau-Odernheim, St. Rufus Church, Catholic-United simultaneum until the present day
- Goldenstedt, in Vechta, Lower Saxony was a simultaneum between 1650 and 1850.
- Groß Ammensleben, former Cloister Church, from 1614 until 1817 a Catholic-Lutheran simultaneum, since then a Catholic-United simultaneum
- Hahn im Hunsrück, Catholic-United simultaneum until the present day
- Hildesheim, St. Michael's Church, since 1542 a Catholic-Lutheran simultaneum
- Frankenhof, St. Margareth Church, Catholic-Lutheran simultaneum until the present day
- Götzendorf in Bavaria, St. Magdalena Church, Catholic-Lutheran simultaneum until the present day
- Illschwang, St. Vitus Church, Catholic-Lutheran simultaneum until the present day
- Kulmbach, the castle chapel on the Plassenburg, Catholic-Lutheran simultaneum until the present day
- Mosbach, St. Juliana Collegiate Church, Catholic-United simultaneum until the present day
- Neuried-Schutterzell, St. Michael's Church, a Catholic-United since 1804
- Neustadt an der Weinstraße, Collegiate Church, Catholic-United simultaneum until the present day
- Otterberg, Otterberg Abbey, Catholic-United simultaneum until the present day
- Rheinberg-Ossenberg, Castle Chapel, a Catholic-United simultaneum until the present day
- Ringstedt, St. Fabian Church, since 1706 a Reformed-Lutheran simultaneum
- Rohrdorf in the Black Forest, John's Church, a Catholic-United simultaneum until the present day
- Saarbrücken, Church of Peace (German: Friedenskirche), an Old Catholic-Russian Orthodox simultaneum until the present day
- Siebeldingen, St. Quintinus Church, a Catholic-United simultaneum until the present day
- Thuine, St. George's Church, Catholic-Reformed simultaneum until the present day
- Vechta, Cloister Church (German: Klosterkirche), since 1818 a Catholic-Lutheran simultaneum
- Wachenheim an der Weinstraße, St. George's Church, Catholic-United simultaneum until the present day
- Wetzlar, former collegiate church, colloquially Wetzlar Cathedral, since 1544–1817 a Catholic-Lutheran, from then on a Catholic-United simultaneum
- Wilnsdorf-Rödgen, St. John the Baptist Church, Catholic-United simultaneum until the present day
- Worms-Pfeddersheim, simultaneum, Catholic-United simultaneum until the present day
- Worms-Rheindürkheim, St. Peter Church, Catholic-United simultaneum until the present day

=== Netherlands ===
- In the Lands of Overmaas in the 17th century, the government of the Dutch Republic mandated that simultaneum applied to the region's churches, which were shared between Catholics and Calvinists.

=== Poland ===
- Gniezno, St. Michał Kozal Church, Roman Catholic and Evangelical (of the Augsburg confession) simultaneum (the church with two presbyteries)

=== United Kingdom ===
- Arundel, St. Nicholas' Church and Fitzalan Chapel. This consists of an Anglican parish church, with a separate Roman Catholic chapel attached, the latter being the burial place of the Dukes of Norfolk. Although these exist within a single building, it is suggested that this should not be properly considered a simultaneum, as there is no worship space which is shared, but used at different times. The two spaces are separated by an iron grille, and a glass screen, which is kept locked, except during very occasional ecumenical services. The glass screen replaces a brick wall which was erected by a Duke of Norfolk in the 19th century. It was lowered in 1956 and entirely removed in 1970.
- Warrington, The Church of the Resurrection and St. Bridget was a shared church building between the Church of England's Church of the Resurrection and the Roman Catholic's St Bridget's RC Church. The building opened in 1988 after originally being planned in 1984 when Bishop David Sheppard, the Anglican Bishop of Liverpool, and Archbishop Derek Worlock, RC Prelate of Liverpool, put forward the proposal. The worship space within the Church was shared by both communities, but Anglican and Catholic services were at different times throughout the week. The Church closed in November 2022 due to falling numbers of parishioners.

=== United States ===
- Virginia Beach, Church of the Holy Apostles, Roman Catholic and Anglican simultaneum
- Pennsylvania; Historically, Lutheran (ELCA) and Reformed (UCC) German immigrants commonly shared churches, particularly in the Pennsylvania Dutch Country region, although some congregations have since built their own separate churches.

== Holy Land church-sharing ==
The main traditional pilgrim churches of Jerusalem and Bethlehem are shared between several denominations. The regulatory work is known as the "Status quo", a type of church-sharing which is in no way related to the West European Protestant-Catholic sharing system described here (the "simultaneum").

- Church of the Holy Sepulchre, Jerusalem - Greek Orthodox-Eastern Orthodox-Oriental Orthodox-Catholic simultaneum until the present day
- Church of the Nativity in Bethlehem

== See also ==
- Ecumenism
- Local ecumenical partnership
- Interfaith worship spaces
- Multifaith space
