= St. Martin's Church, Biberach =

Coordinates: 48°05′55″N 9°47′21″E

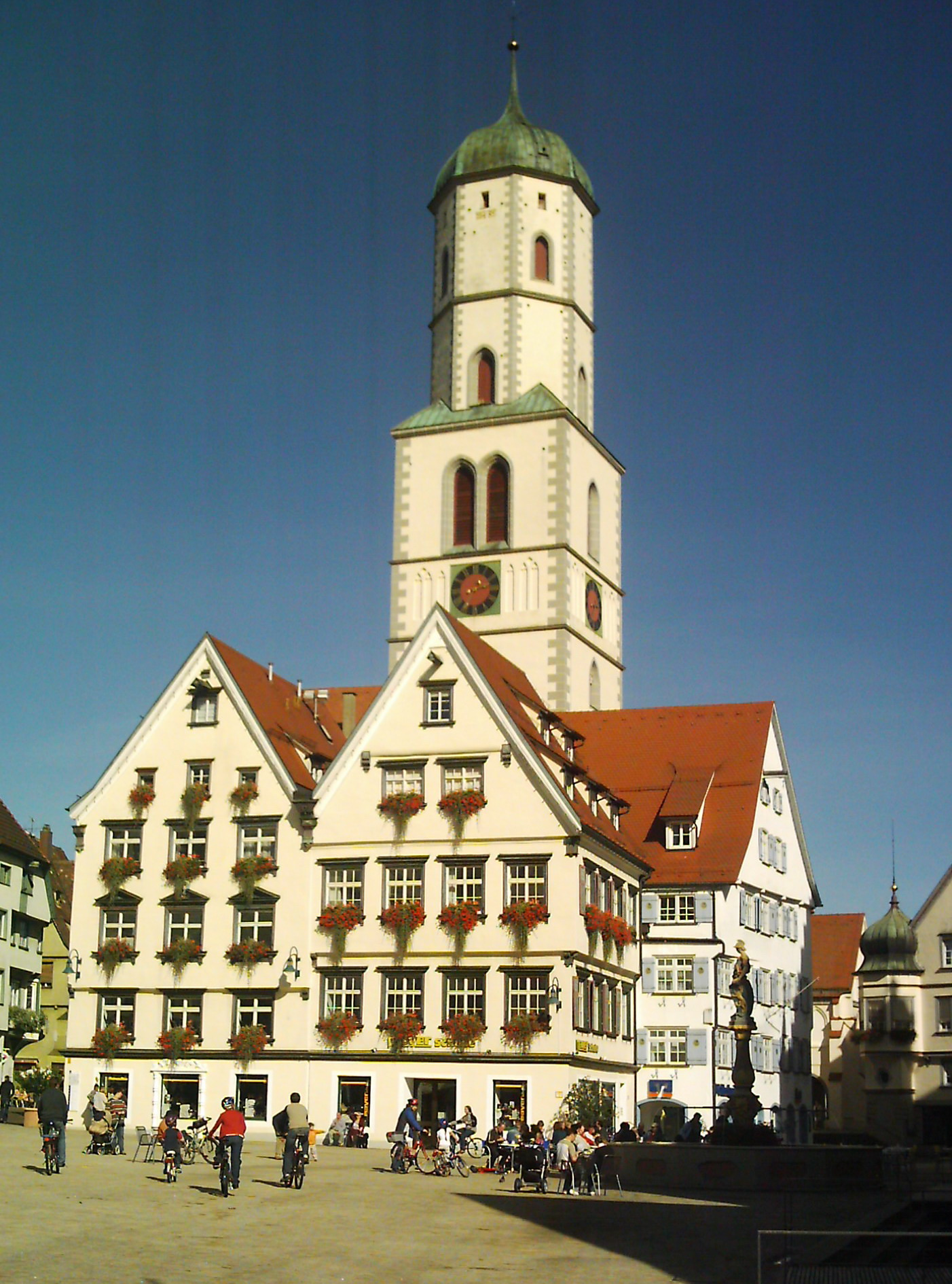
St. Martin's Church

St. Martin's Church, Biberach is a church in Biberach an der Riß, in the Upper Swabia region of the German state (Land) of Baden-Württemberg. It is the oldest still active Simultaneum or shared church in Germany. Its two congregations form part of the Roman Catholic Diocese of Rottenburg-Stuttgart and the Lutheran Evangelical Regional Church in Württemberg, respectively.

== History ==
Schematical illustration of a plan view of a cathedral, with the colored area showing the nave

St. Martin's was built in 1337-1366 and served as the parish church of Biberach before the Reformation. With the conversion of almost the entire population of the town to Lutheranism, the church was used for Lutheran services. Then, in 1548 the Holy Roman Emperor Charles V ordered that Catholic services be resumed. The solution was to divide the church, with Catholic services held in the former choir and Lutheran services in the larger nave. The arrangement was made permanent by the Peace of Augsburg.

For centuries, the two denominations' use of the church was regulated by the time of day. Catholics used the church from 5am to 6am, Lutherans from 6 to 8, Catholics again from 8 to 11, Lutherans from 11 to 12, and so on through the day. Catholics could use all parts of the church during their hours, although there were too few in Biberach to fill the church, while Lutherans were restricted to the nave except during the Lord's Supper when they were allowed to use the choir. The tower bells were rung by each denomination in turn.

During times of religious strife, the sharing of the church became tense. in 1638, during the Thirty Years War, someone blew his nose into the Catholic vessel containing Holy water. The Catholics retaliated by locking the door to the choir, making it impossible for the Lutherans to follow their usual custom of having the Lutheran pastor celebrate Holy Communion while standing in the choir. The next year, a Catholic rang the bells to disrupt the wedding of a prominent Lutheran couple underway in the nave. A crowd gathered and a riot ensued large enough to be investigated by an imperial commission, which resolved issues surrounding shared use of the church.

== Interior and art ==
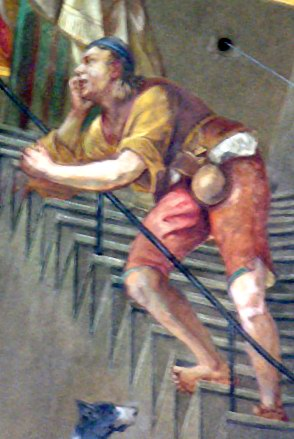
Image of artist Johannes Zick painted in the ceiling fresco

The interior was remodeled and decorated in baroque style in 1746. The richly carved, gothic, early 16th century choir stalls were preserved when most of the interior decorations were removed during the iconoclasm of the Reformation.

The ceiling frescoes were created during the renovation by Johannes Zick, who included a self-portrait. The frescoes in the Lutheran area, the nave, depict the life of Jesus, the wise men and shepherds at the Nativity, the circumcision, Jesus among the scribes, and the events of Easter and Pentecost. The frescoes in the Catholic area, or choir, are of the Roman Catholic theme of the Church triumphant, they depict the Evangelists, the Fathers of the Church, the Archangel Michael, and the Virgin Mary being crowned with the Papal Tiara by angels.

Between the Catholic choir area and the Protestant nave is a large clock, with two faces, one visible from each part of the shared church.

== See also ==
- Photographs of the church
