= Schloss Petersaue =

Former neoclassical palace on the Rhine Isle of Petersaue near Mainz, Germany

Coordinates: 50°01′36″N 8°15′02″E

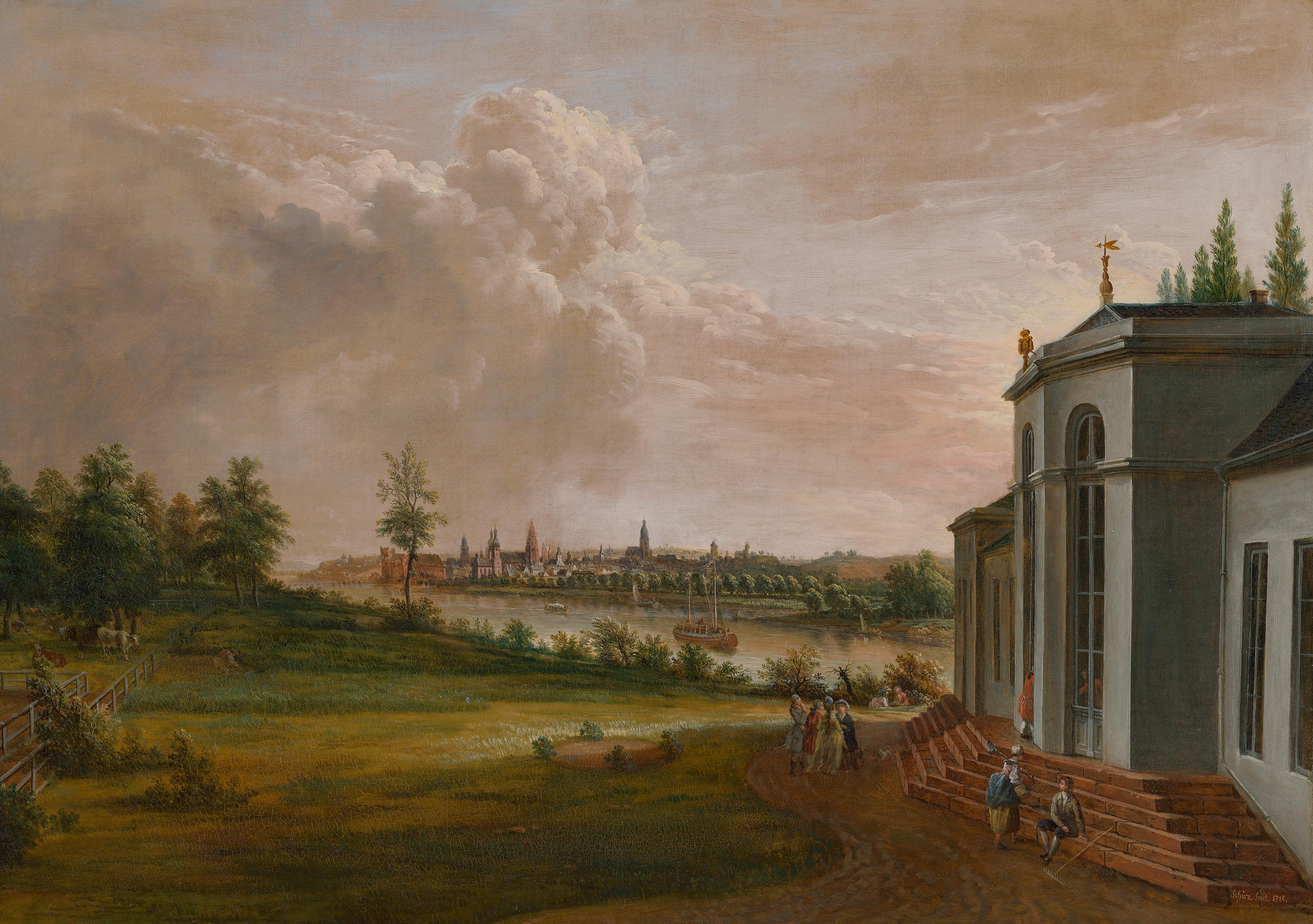
View of Mainz from the Rhine Isle of Petersaue with the Electoral Summer Palace by Christian Georg Schütz around 1786 (State Gallery Schloss Johannisberg - Kurmainzische Galerie, Inv. Nr. 6569)

Petersaue Palace (German: Schloss Petersaue) is a former neoclassical palace on the Rhine Isle of Petersaue near Mainz, Germany. It was commissioned by Prince-elector and Archbishop of Mainz, Friedrich Karl Joseph von Erthal (1719–1802). Today nothing remains anymore of the palace.

== History ==
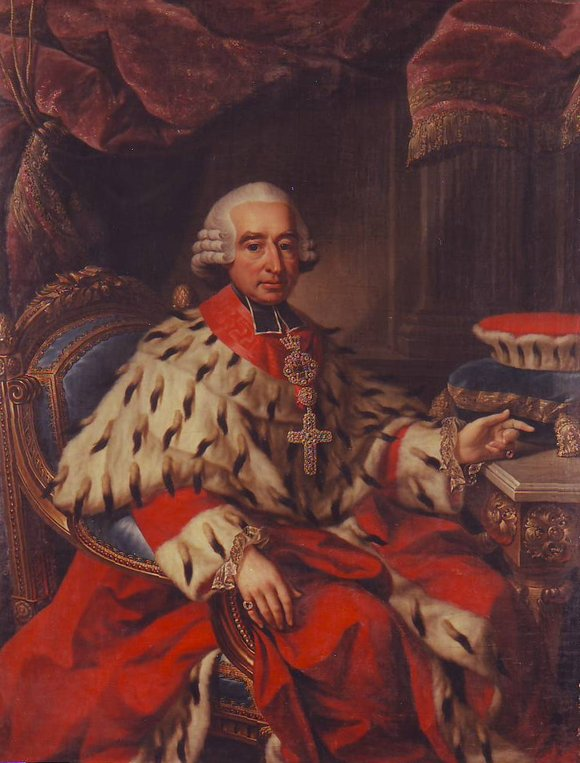
Friedrich Karl Joseph von Erthal

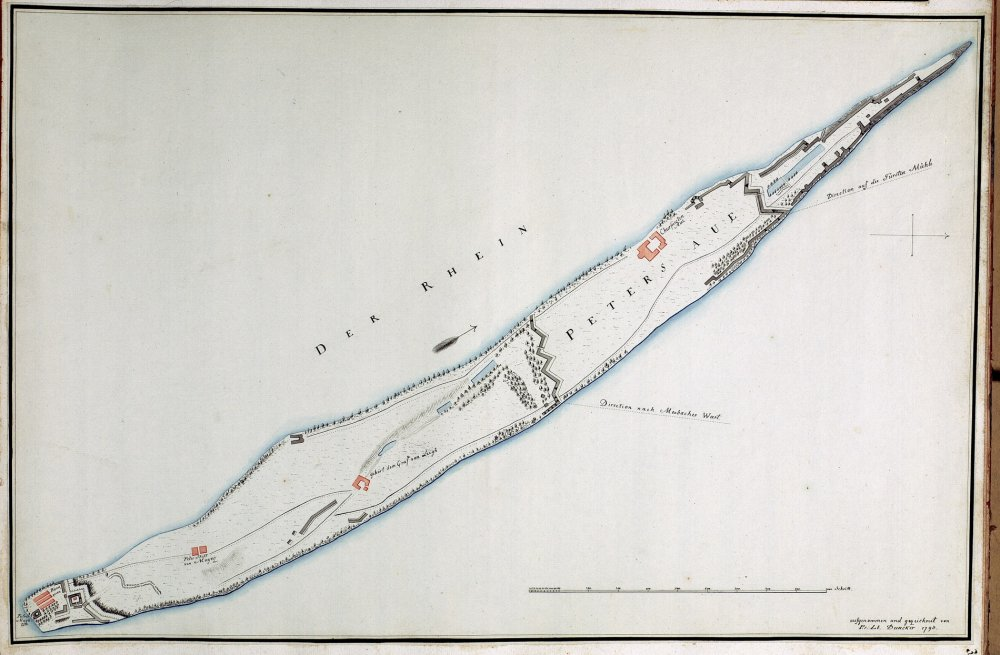
Map of the Rhine Isle of Petersaue of 1798 showing the location of the Electoral Palace right above and the fortifications created by the French

Petersaue is an island in the Rhine river near Mainz. It was originally the property of the collegiate church monastery of St. Peter before the walls, to which the isle owes its name. The monastery existed since the 10th century and was dedicated to the apostle Peter as patron. The monks build a charterhouse on the island.

Friedrich Karl Joseph von Erthal was Prince-elector and Archbishop of Mainz from 1774 to 1802. Near his secondary residence, Schloss Johannisburg in Aschaffenburg, he created the Schönbusch Palace with one of the first English landscape gardens of Germany.

In 1781, he acquired the charterhouse on the Petersaue Island. Behind the charterhouse with view on Mainz, he constructed a one-storey maison de plaisance in neoclassical style.

Who the architect of Schloss Petersaue is, is not known. The Portuguese architect Emanuel Joseph von Herigoyen (1746-1817) could be a possibility as he designed various buildings for the Prince-elector in Aschaffenburg and Schönbusch. Another candidate is Francois Ignace Mangin (1742-1809), who designed the Electoral Palace in Koblenz. The palace was decorated with frescoes by the Koblenz painter Januarius Zick. Zick also worked at the Electoral palace in the city of Mainz itself. This part of the Petersaue island became known as the Electoral Island (German: Kurfürstliche Aue).

Ownership of the palace changed multiple times in the Napoleonic times. During the French Revolutionary Wars, Mainz was besieged and conquered by the French. They decided to significantly enlarge the Fortress of Mainz, and strongly fortified the island of Petersaue.

Today nothing remains anymore of the Electoral palace on the Petersaue Island. There are various maps of the island showing the locations of the palace. Also, there is a painting with a view of Mainz by Christian Georg Schütz showing the Electoral palace of Petersaue. It is owned by the Bavarian State Painting Collections (inventory number 6569) and part of the State Gallery of Schloss Johannisberg, where it is on display with other Views of Mainz by Christian Georg Schütz. The island itself is not accessible for visitors.

== Literature ==
- Schaab, Karl Anton (1844). Geschichte der Stadt Mainz (in German). Mainz. p. 515.
- Mussel, Constantin Johannes (2022). Brüchert, Hedwig (ed.). "Mainz - Stadt am Strom: Katalog zur Sonderausstellung im Stadthistorischen Museum Mainz 30. April 2022 bis 30. April 2023 - Ein Geschenk des Rheins - die "Mainzer" Rheinauen". Schriftenreihe des Stadthistorischen Museums Mainz Band 15 (in German). Mainz: Förderverein Stadthistorisches Museum Mainz e.V.: 94–99. ISSN 1868-3177.
