= Januarius Zick =

Painter and architect (1730–1797)

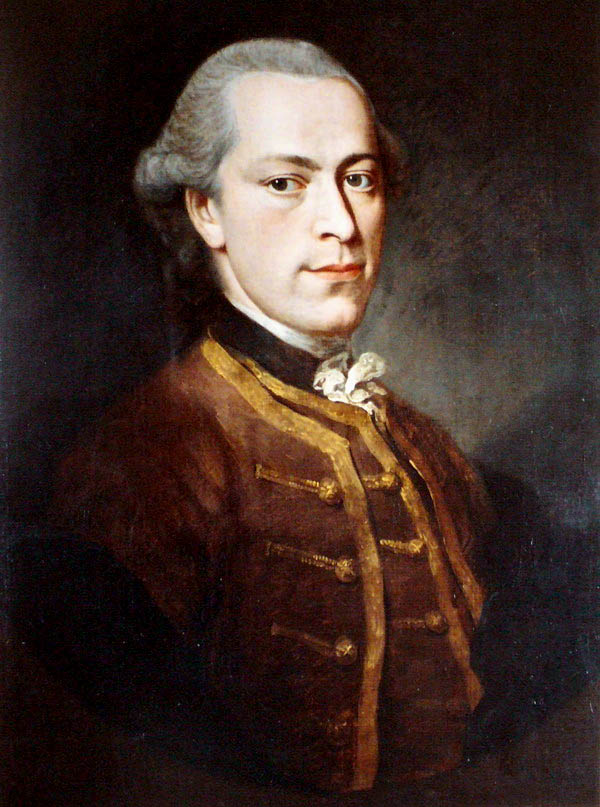
- Born: Johann Rasso Januarius Zick; February 6, 1730; Munich, Electorate of Bavaria, Holy Roman Empire
- Died: November 14, 1797 (aged 67); Ehrenbreitstein Fortress, Holy Roman Empire
- Known for: Painting
- Spouse: Anna Maria Gruber
- Children: Konrad Zick
- Father: Johannes Zick
- Relatives: Gustav Zick (grandson), Alexander Zick (great grandson)

Johann Rasso Januarius Zick (6 February 1730 – 14 November 1797) was a German painter and architect. He is considered to be one of the main masters of the Late-Baroque.

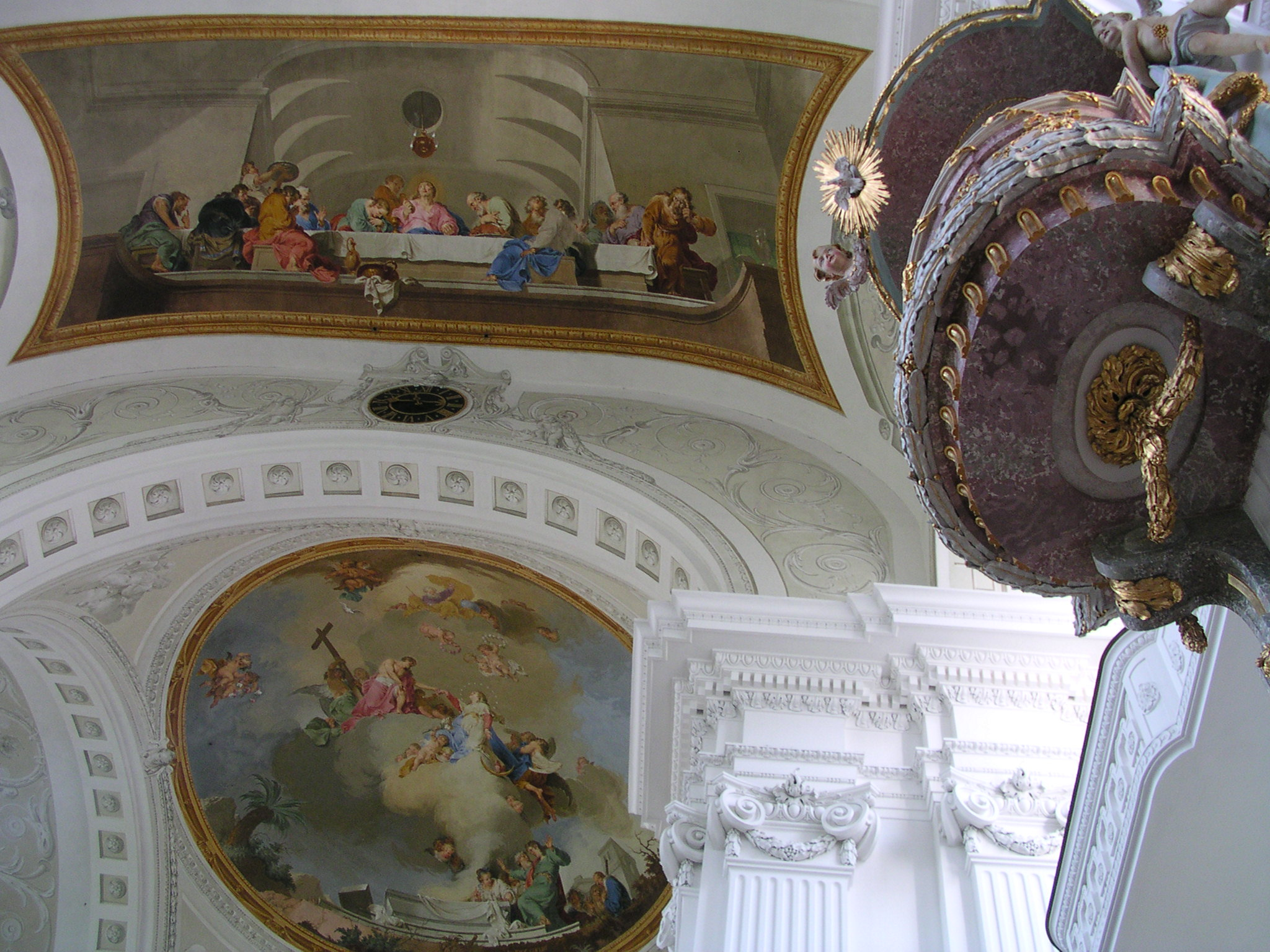
Monastery church St Verena, fresco

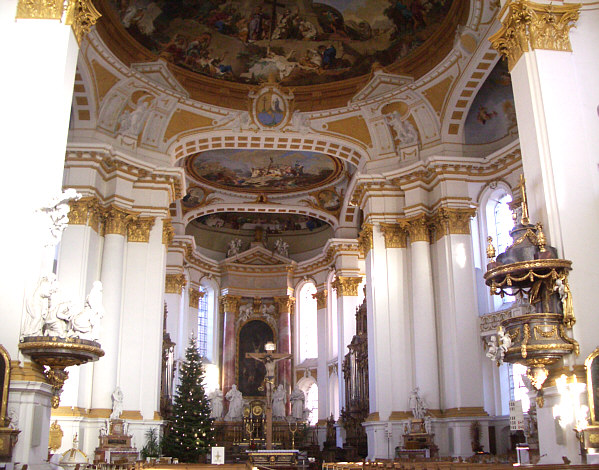
Abbey church Wiblingen, interior

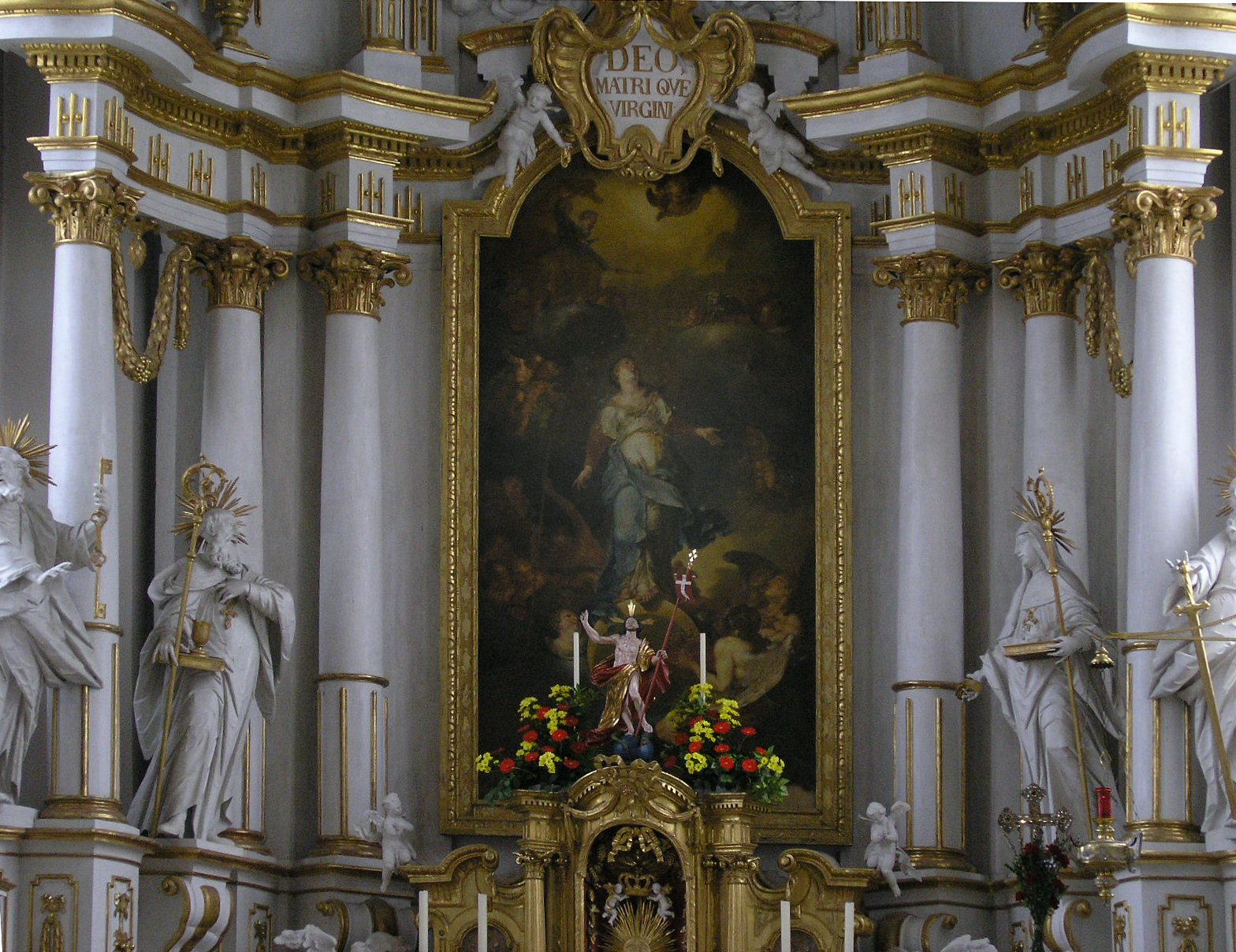
Monastery church of Elchingen, high altar

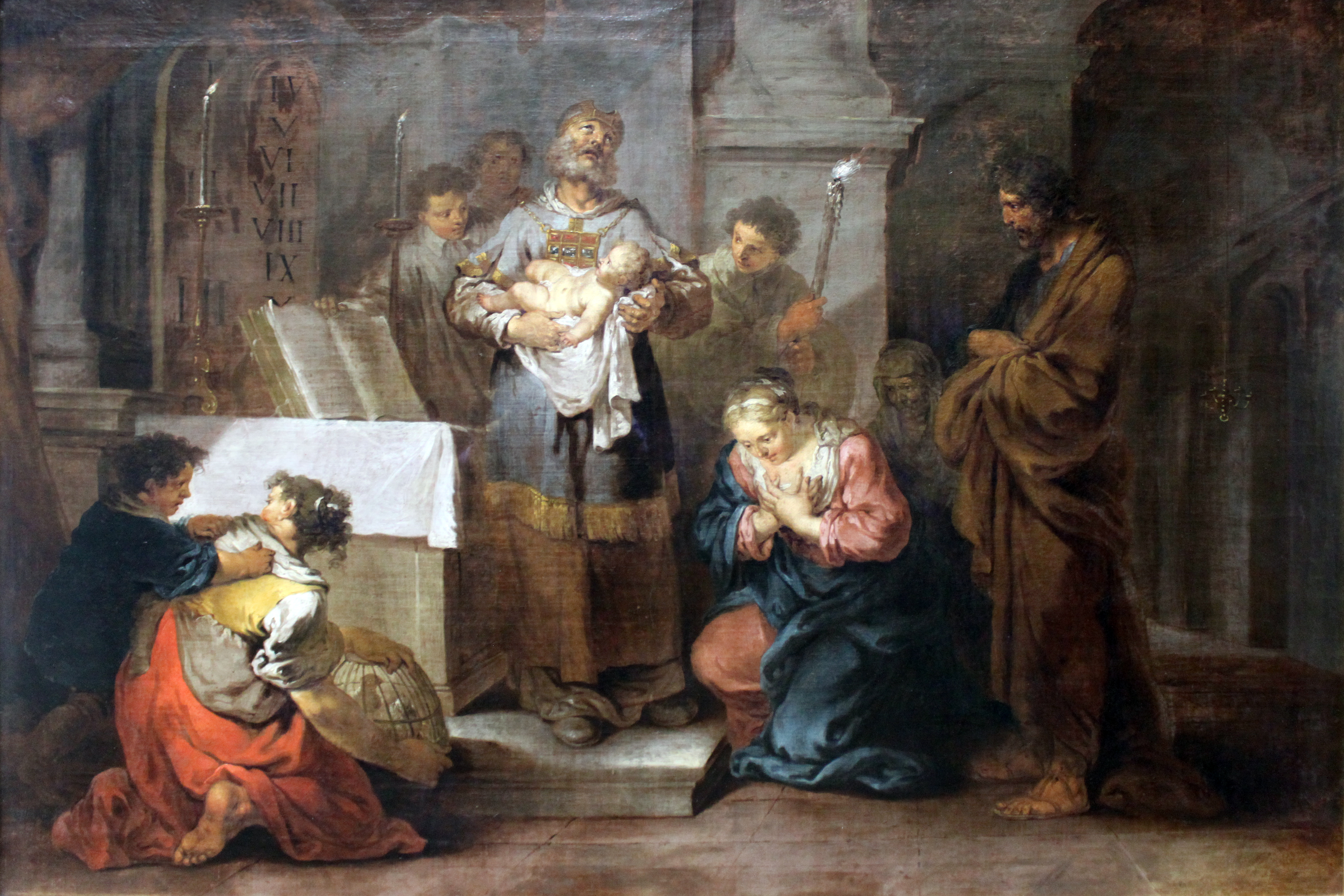
Presentation of Christ in the Temple, 1765, Städelsches Kunstinstitut

== Life ==
Januarius Zick was born in Munich and began to learn his trade from his father, Johannes Zick, a renowned painter himself, to whom he was apprenticed in order to learn how to paint frescoes. In 1744, when Januarius Zick was fourteen years old, his brother, three years his junior, fell to his death from a scaffolding in Weingarten. From 1745 to 1748, Januarius Zick was apprenticed as a bricklayer to Jakob Emele in Schussenried. Having finished his apprenticeship, he worked, together with his father, at the residence of the Prince-Bishop of Würzburg and then, until the mid-1750s, at the residence of the Prince-Bishop of Speyer in Bruchsal.

In 1756, Januarius Zick went to Paris for further education. There, he came into contact with artists and art connoisseurs from Rome, Basel and Augsburg, who broadened his horizon concerning his art and had a considerable influence on him.

After having furnished Schloss Engers near Neuwied with frescoes in 1760, he was appointed court painter to the Prince-Elector of Trier, the archbishop of Trier. He married in Ehrenbreitstein and settled there.

After 1774, he also designed intarsia paintings for cabinet maker David Roentgen.

From the late 1770s on, Januarius Zick was very active in Upper Swabia, furnishing a number of monastery churches and parish churches with frescoes and altarpieces.

After the mid-1780s until his death, he was productive in the territories of the Prince-Elector of Trier and the Prince-Elector of Mainz.

He died in Ehrenbreitstein.

== Works ==
- 1760 - Schloss Engers, frescoes
- 1778 until 1781 - Benedictine church, Wiblingen Abbey, painter and interior designer
- 1780 - Parish church Zell (Riedlingen)
- 1780s - Schloss Petersaue
- 1782 - Parish church Dürrenwaldstetten
- 1782/83 - Benedictine monastery church Oberelchingen near Ulm
- 1784 - Premonstratensian monastery church Rot an der Rot Abbey
- 1785 - Residence of the Prince-Elector of Trier in Koblenz, fresco painter
- 1786 - Church St Ignatius and office of cathedral provost in Mainz
- 1786 - Augustinian monastery church Triefenstein
- 1787 - Prince-Elector's Castle in Mainz
- 1790 - Court church in Koblenz, altarpiece
- 1792 and 1793 - Representative buildings in Frankfurt am Main, Palace Schweitzer and Russischer Hof

== See also ==
- Upper Swabian Baroque Route
- Zick
