= Zicker =

Zicker may refer to:

- Klein Zicker, a village in the Thiessow municipality, Mecklenburg-Vorpommern, Germany
- Groß Zicker, a village in the Gager municipality, Mecklenburg-Vorpommern, Germany
- Zicker, the German name of Sikory, a village in West Pomeranian Voivodeship, Poland
- Zicker See, a bay of the Mönchgut peninsula, Mecklenburg-Vorpommern, Germany
