= Alexander Zick =

German painter (1845–1907)

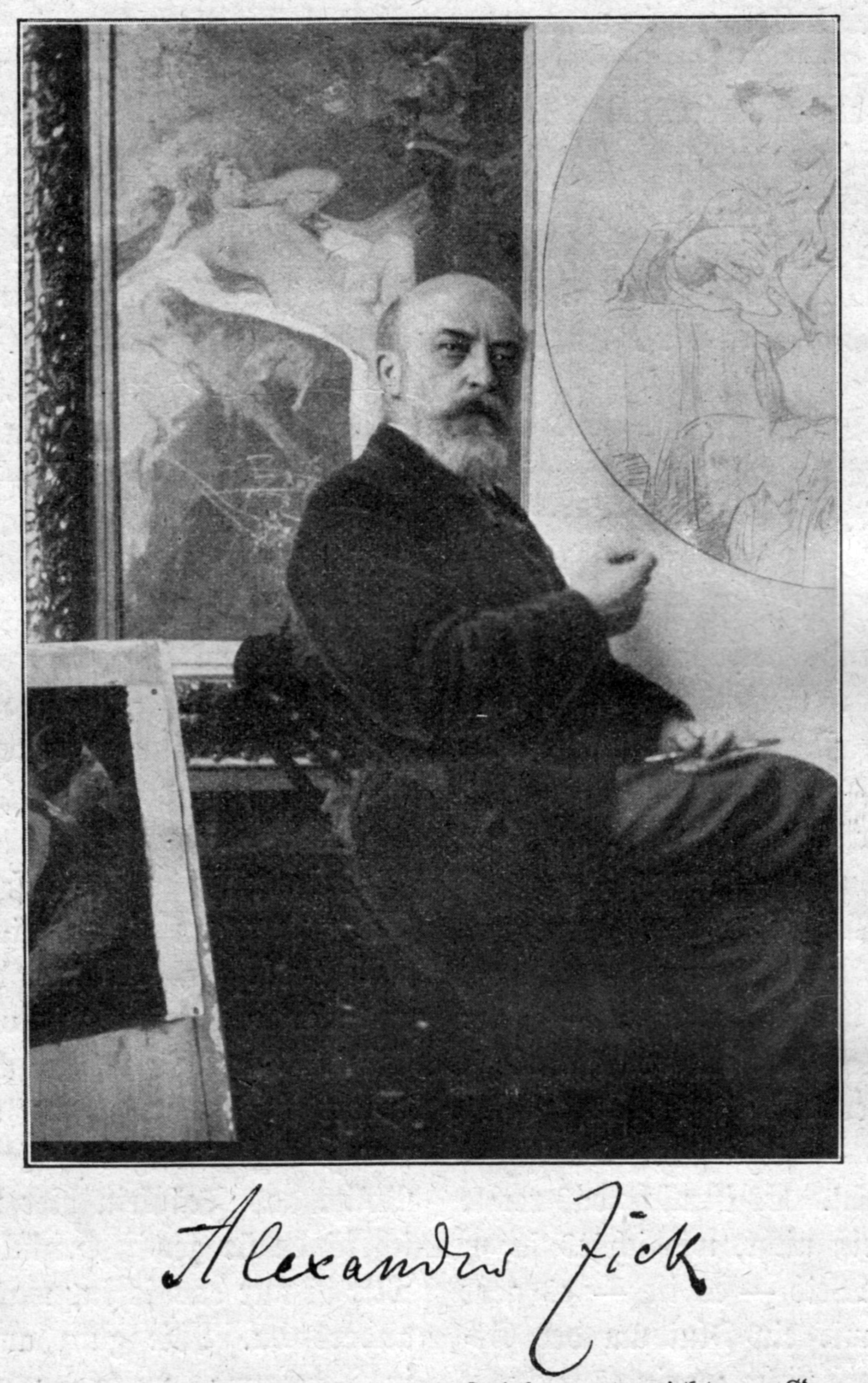

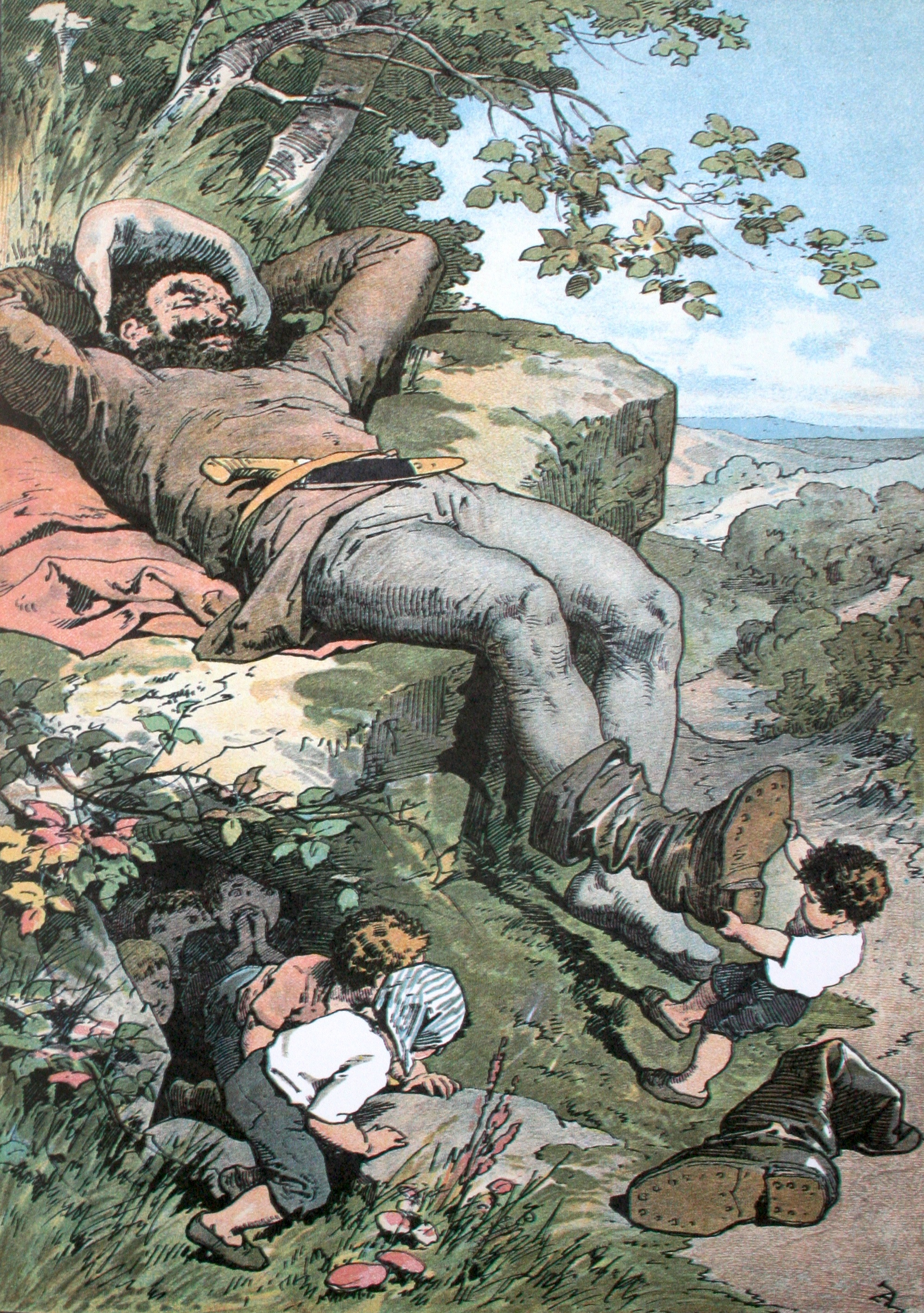
Illustration by Zick for "Hop-o'-My-Thumb"

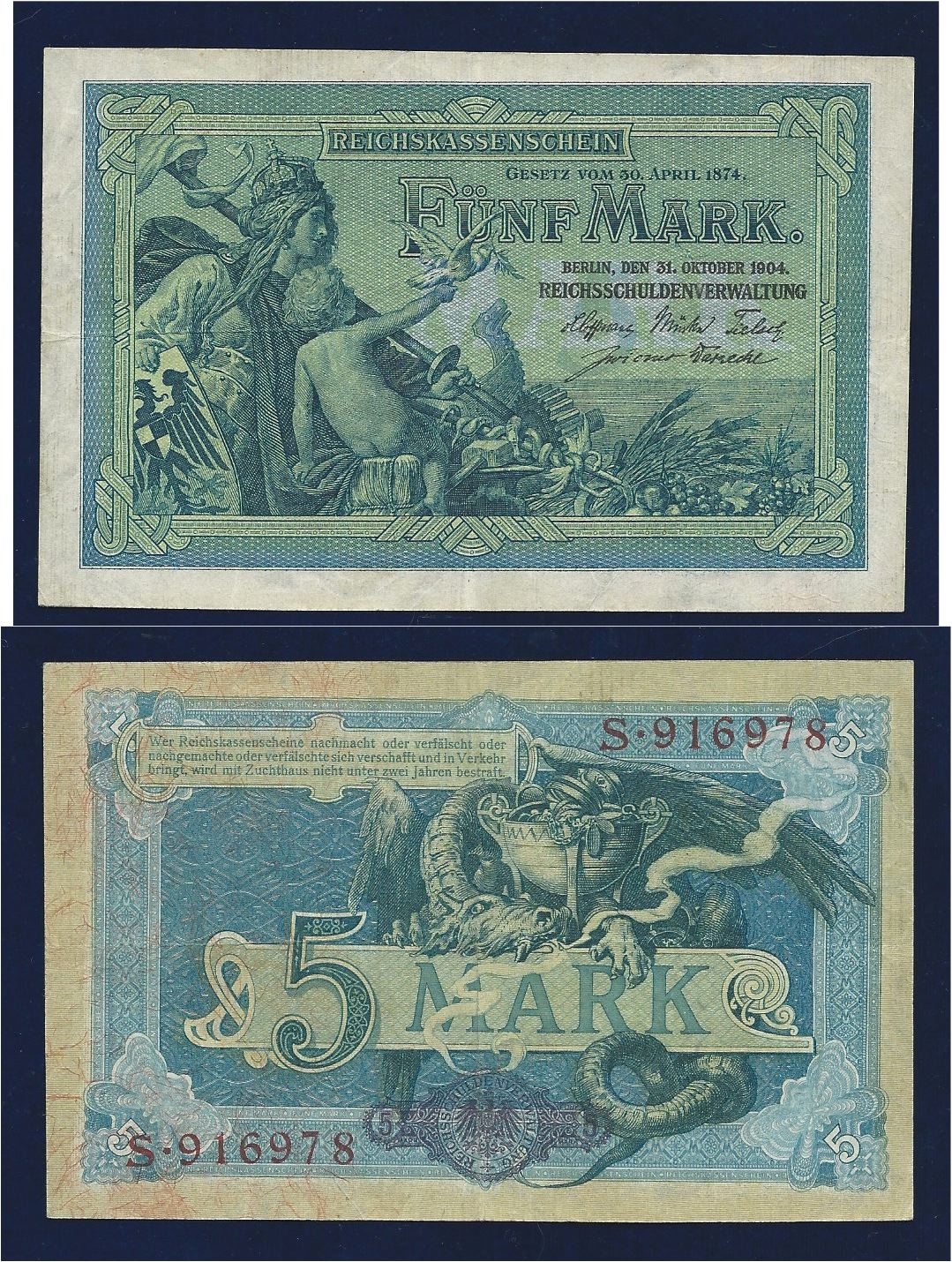
Germany 5 Mark 1904 Art Nouveau Banknote, designed by Alexander Zick

Alexander Zick (born 20 December 1845 – 10 November 1907) was a German painter and illustrator.

The Zick family included multiple generations of painters. Alexander was born in Koblenz, Germany, the son of Gustav Zick, a painter. He was also the great-grandson of the painter and architect Januarius Zick, and the great-great-grandson of fresco artist Johannes Zick.

He was a student of August Wittig at Düsseldorf Academy, first studying sculpture, and then studied painting under the director of the academy, Eduard Bendemann. In 1880, he moved to Berlin, where he studied under Ludwig Knaus. There, Zick worked as a genre and history painter.

Zick later worked mainly as an illustrator. He illustrated classic literature and fairy tales, as well as drew for family and youth magazines. He died in Berlin.

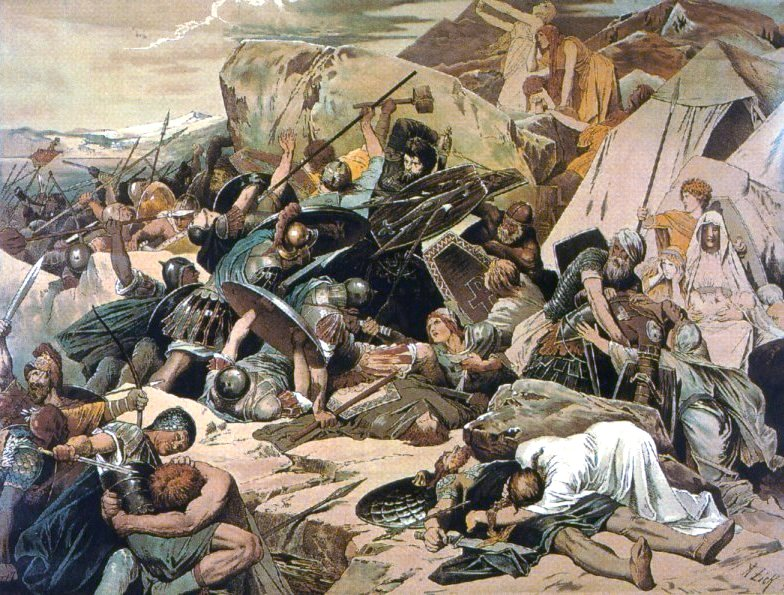
Zick's historical painting of The Ostrogoths' last stand at the Battle of Mons Lactarius

== Numismatic work ==
In the last years of his life, Zick was the designer of 2 German banknotes: the 1904 5 Mark Reichskassenschein, and the 1906 10 Mark Reichskassenschein.

== Selected works ==
- Gockel, Hinckel and Gackeleia, by Clemens Brentano
- The Magical Country (German: Das Zauberland), by E. Engelmann
- In the Pastor's House in Neuenrode (German: Im Pfarrhaus zu Neuenrode) (1898), by M. Eitner
- Father Jansen's Sunshine (German: Vater Jansens Sonnenschein) (1899), by H. Koch
- Little Traudl (German: Traudchen) (1900), by M. Giese

== Gallery ==
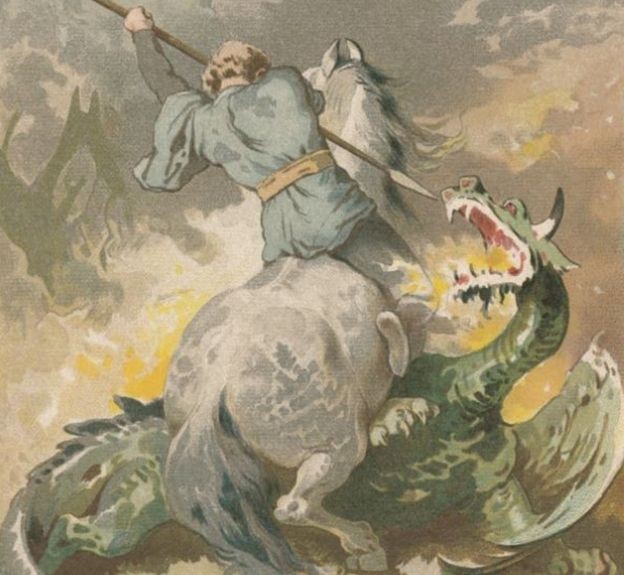
Dragon Slayer (1899)

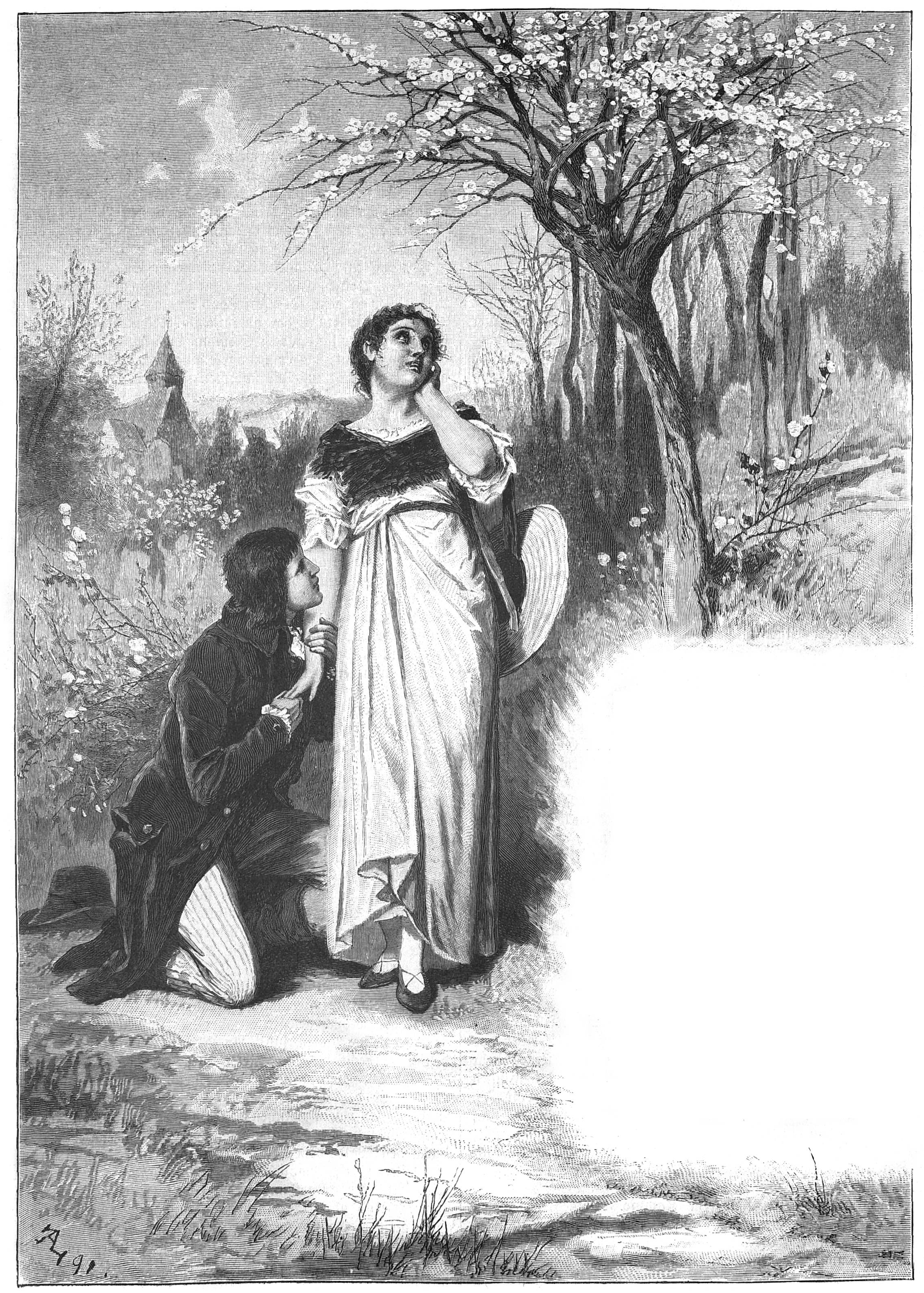
The Garden Arbor (1894)

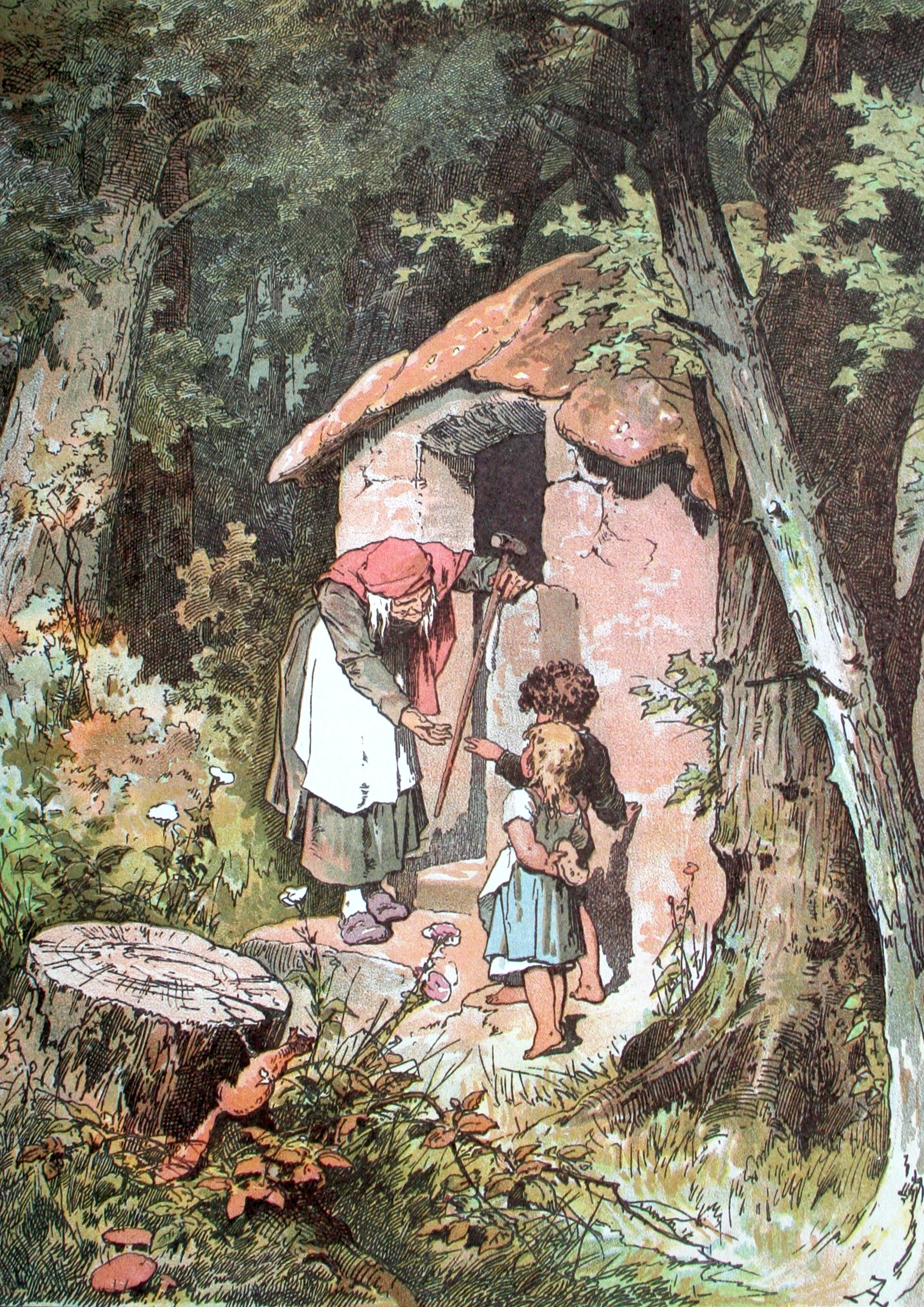
Hänsel und Gretel

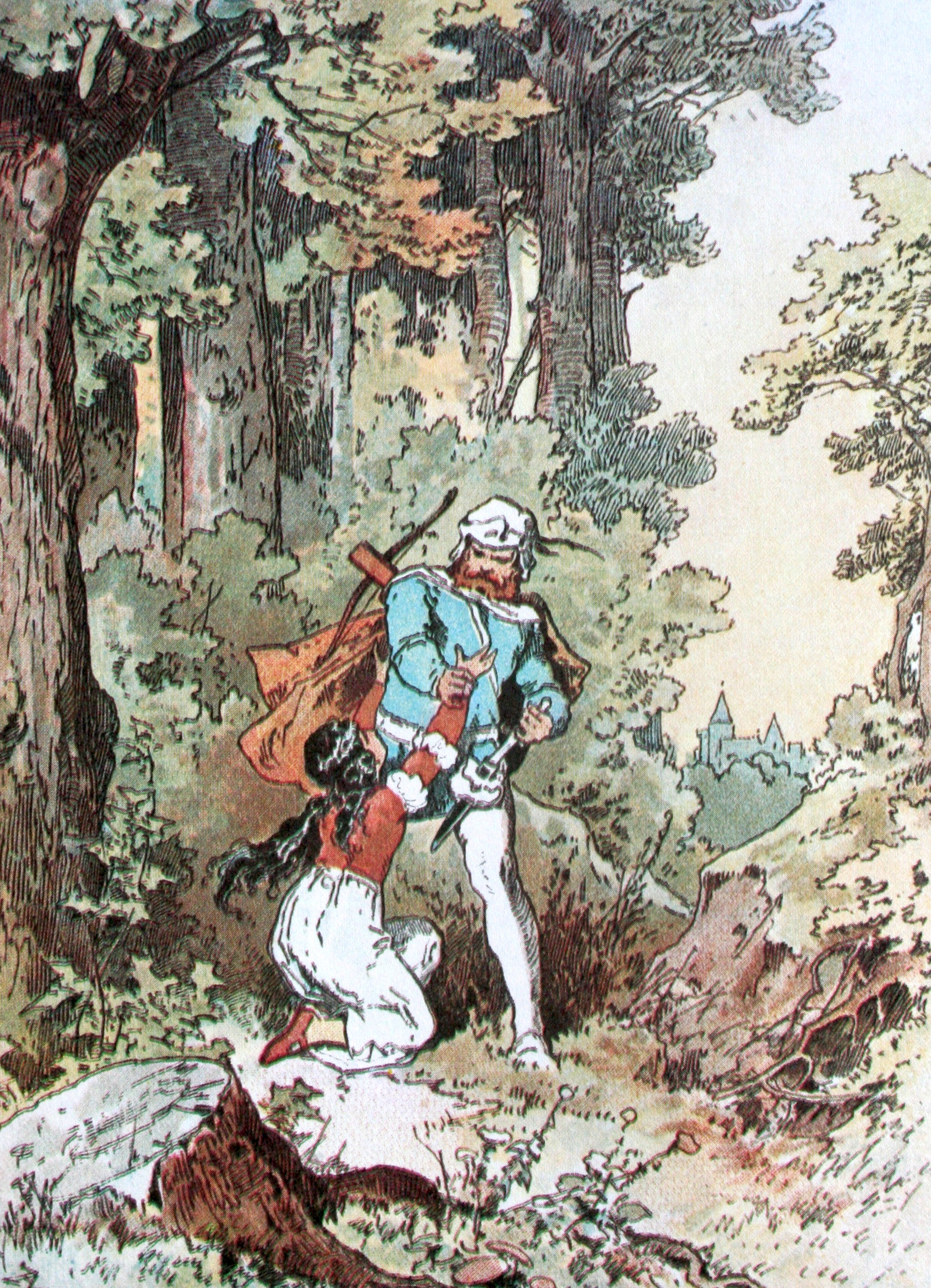
Schneewittchen

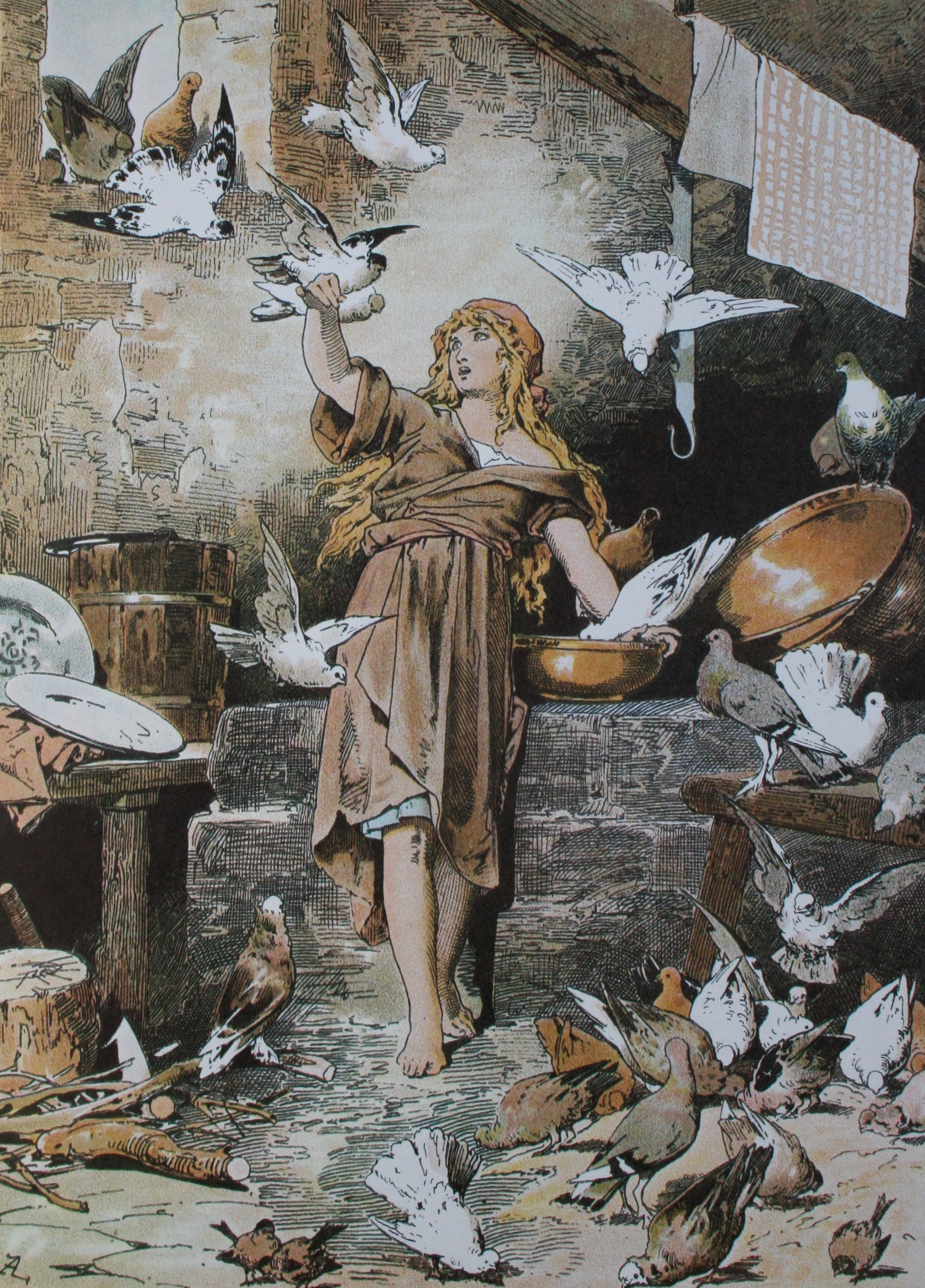
Aschenputtel

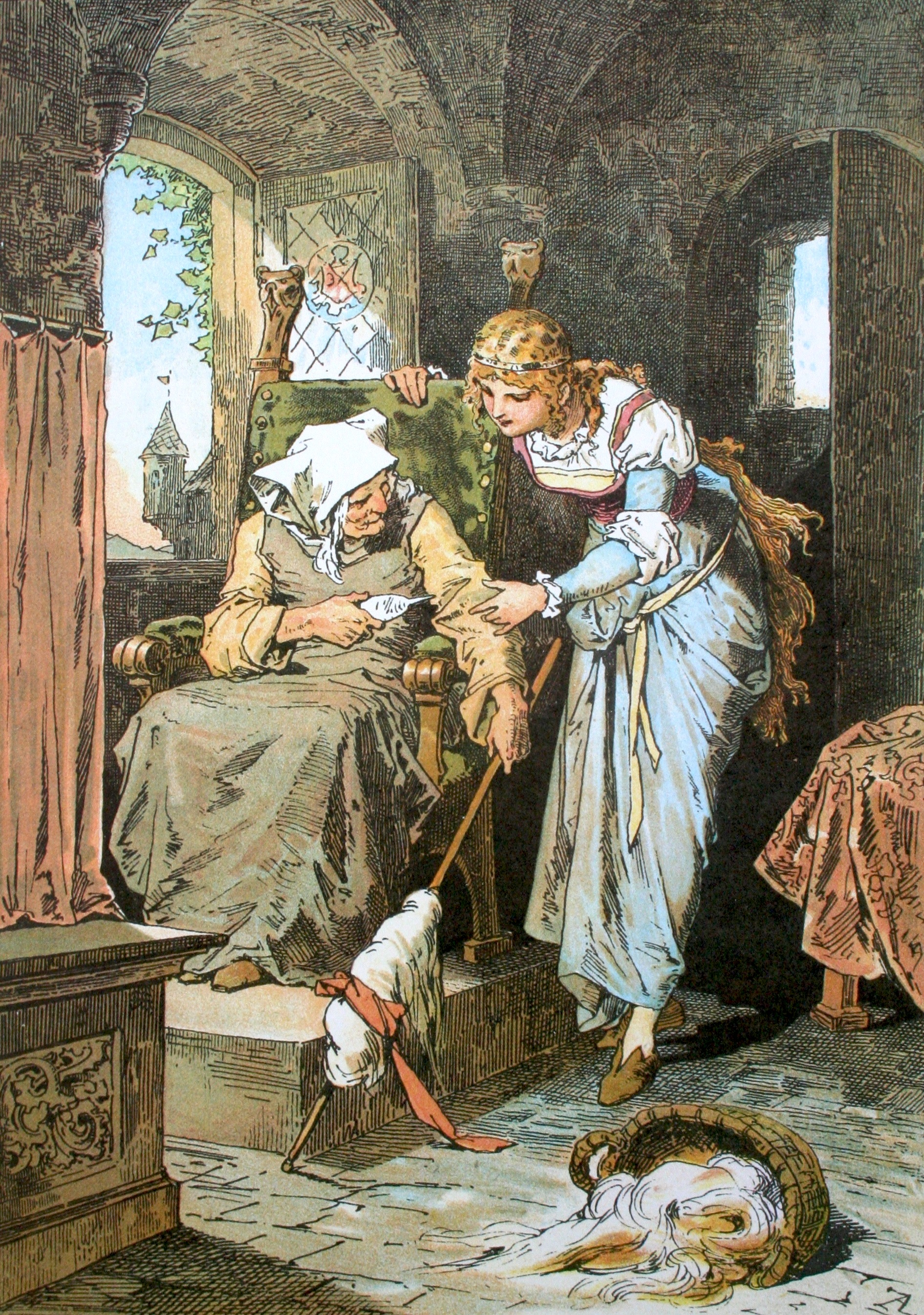
Dornröschen

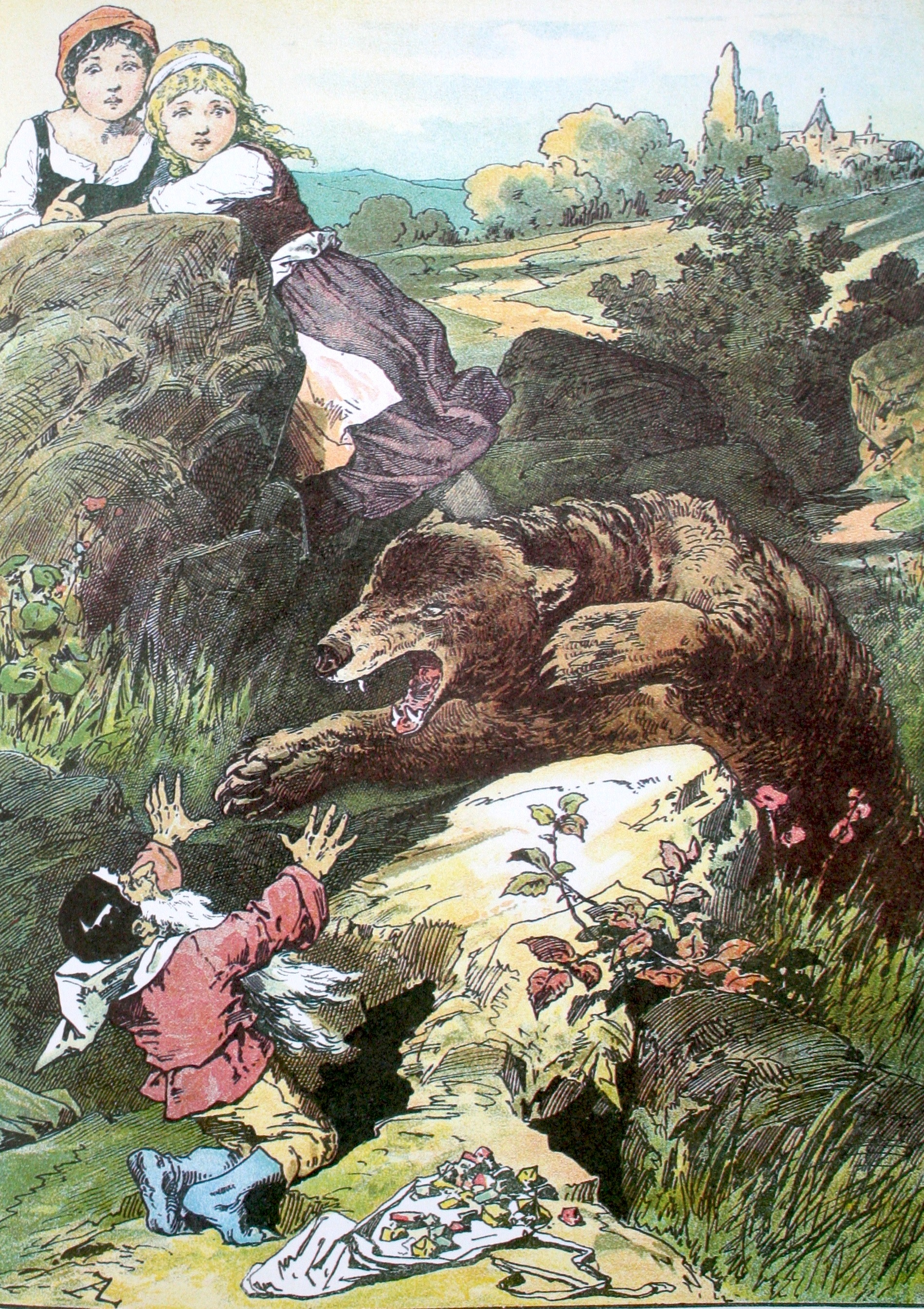
Schneeweisschen und Rosenrot

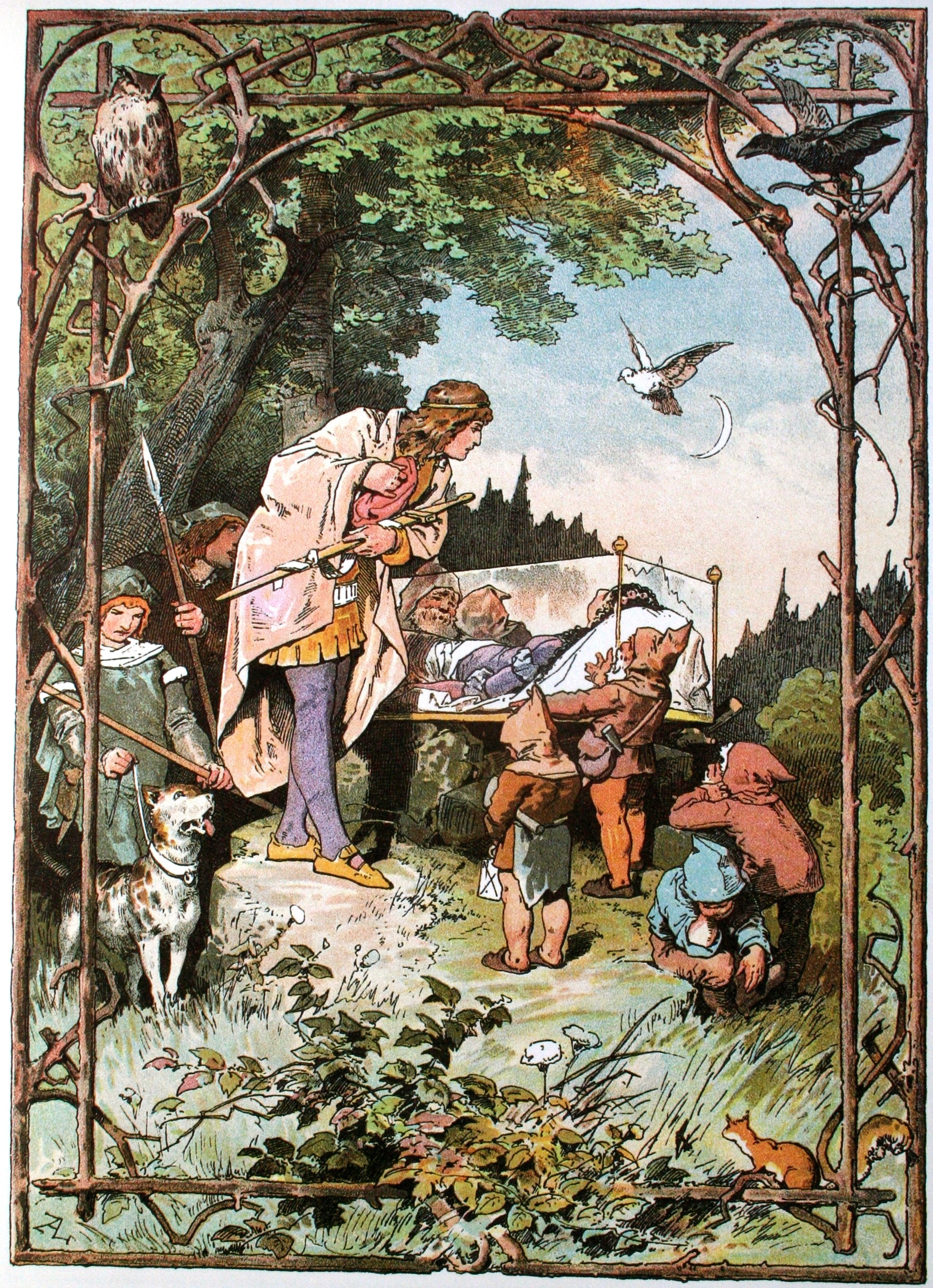
Schneewittchen

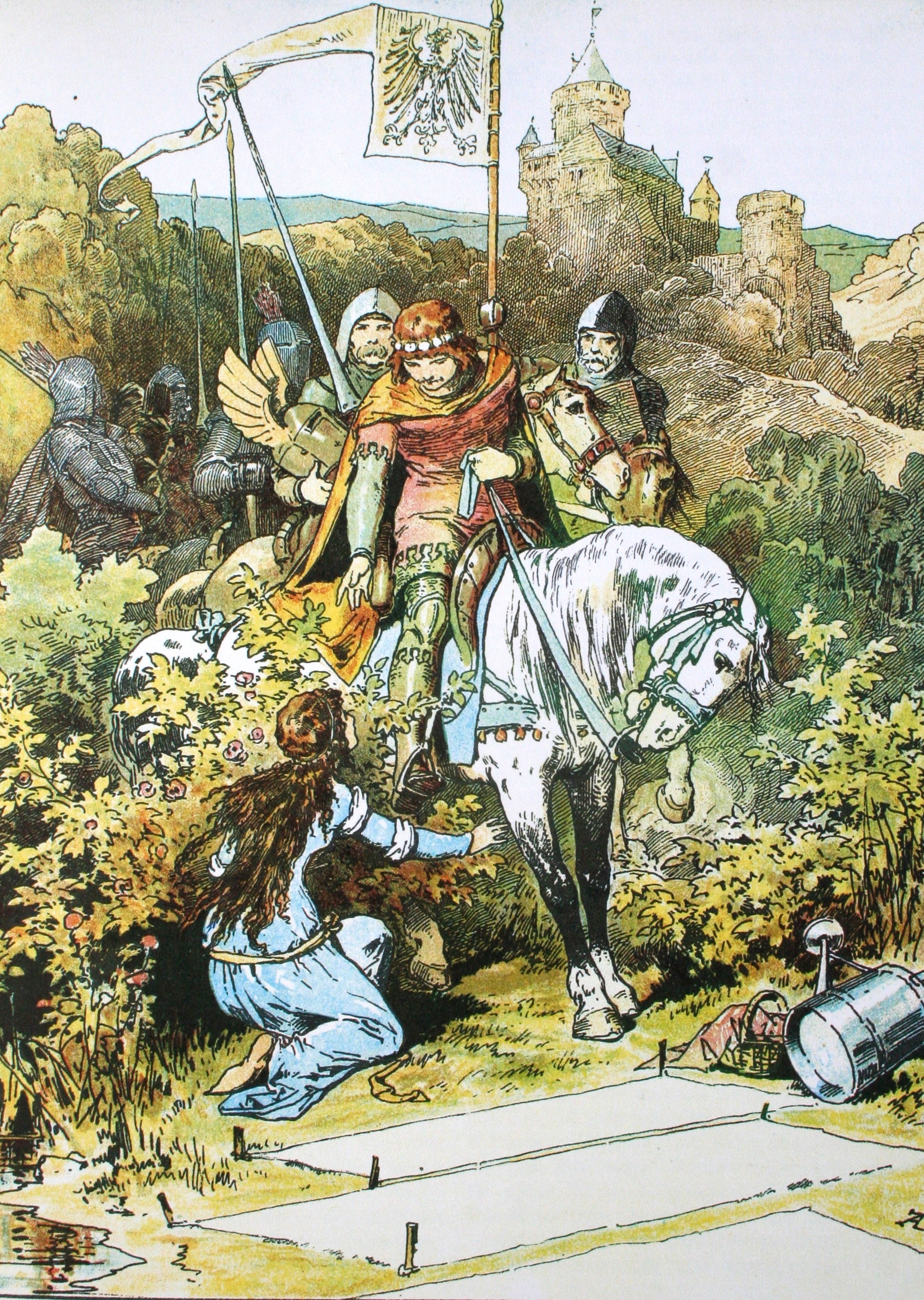
The Three Sisters
