= Rolf Zick =

German journalist (1921–2024)

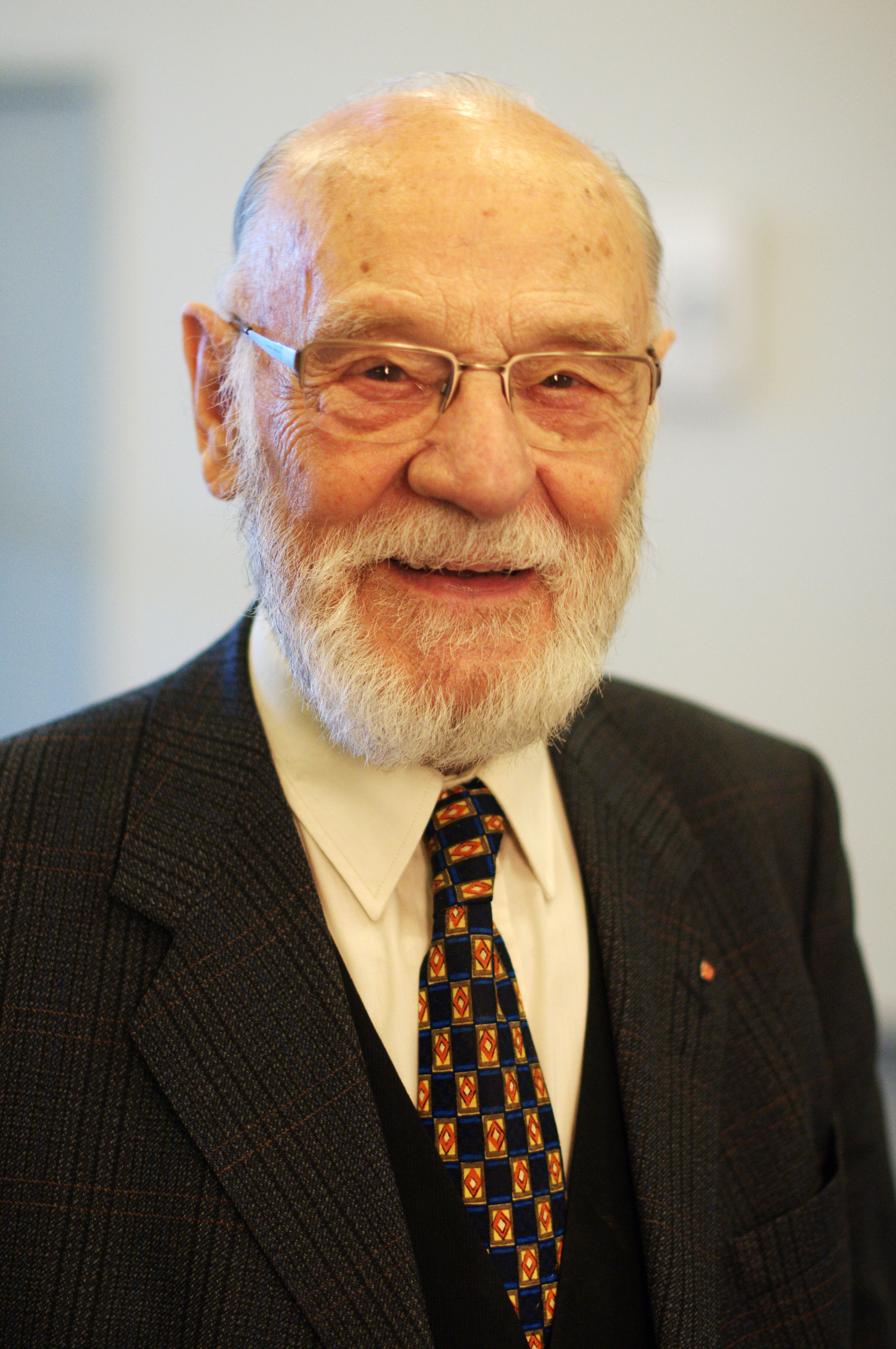
- Zick in 2013
- Born: 16 April 1921; Dransfeld, Province of Hanover, Prussia, Germany
- Died: 8 March 2024 (aged 102); Hanover, Lower Saxony, Germany
- Occupation: Journalist

Rolf Zick (16 April 1921 – 8 March 2024) was a German journalist.

== Life and career ==
Zick was born in Dransfeld on 16 April 1921 to a family of teachers. His father was a member of the Social Democratic Party of Germany from 1924 to 1933, and a member of the Reichsbanner Schwarz-Rot-Gold. Zick reported that his sister was killed under the Nazi regime among the [[Krankenmorde in der Zeit des Nationalsozialismus |Krankenmorde,]] although her name is not officially listed, and his father was degraded and relocated under the Gesetz zur Wiederherstellung des Berufsbeamtentums.

Zick achieved his Abitur at the Martino-Katharineum Braunschweig in 1939 and was then drafted to the Wehrmacht. He experienced 70 bombings of Hanover as a FLAK commander, and was a Soviet prisoner of war until 1948 during which he reports being abused for medical experiments.

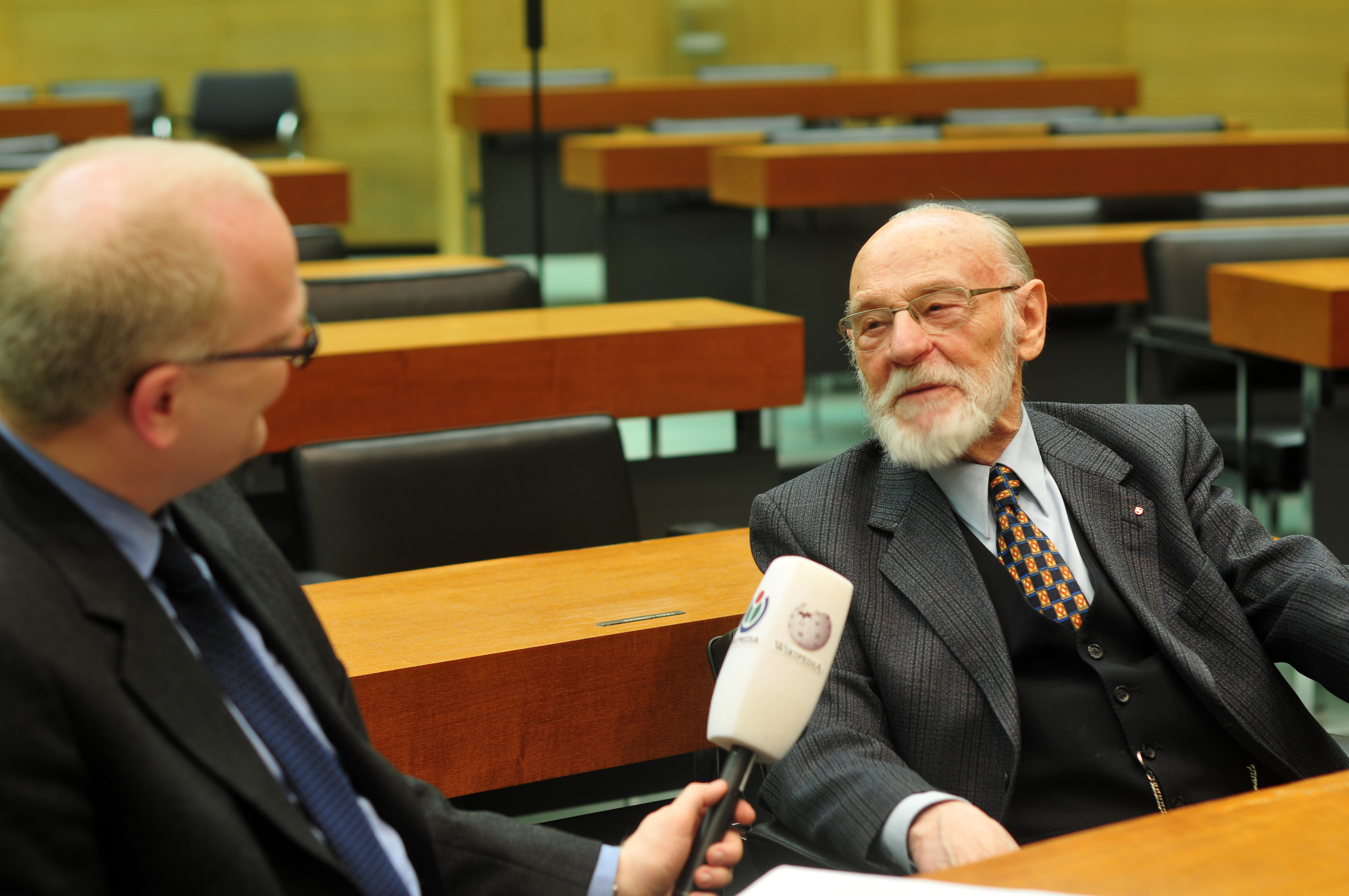
Zick at the Niedersächsischer Landtag, 2013

He then began his career as a journalist with local news in Göttingen. He moved to Hanover in 1960 and reported for decades on state politics in Lower Saxony. He founded an independent press office in 1974, Nordreport, and worked as its chief. He also served as president of the state press conference of Lower Saxony from 1971 to 1990.

His daughter Anne-Maria Zick continued the Nordreport, which eventually merged with the [[Rundblick |Rundblick.]] Zick died in Hanover on 8 March 2024, at the age of 102.

== Awards ==
- 1981 Order of Merit of the Federal Republic of Germany
- 1994 Lower Saxony Order of Merit
- 2011 Niedersächsische Landesmedaille
- 2011 Honorary president of Landespressekonferenz Niedersachsen
- 2020 Leibniz Ring Hanover of Presse Club Hannover
- 2021 Honorary president of Presse Club Hannover

== Publications ==
- (with Burkhard Nowotny): Hörfunk in Grossbritannien. Privater Lokalrundfunk, Verband Nordwestdeutscher Zeitungsverleger, 1980
- (with Maria Haldenwanger, Rolf Manfred Hasse): Kostbarkeiten in Bibliotheken Niedersachsens, ed.: Arbeitsgemeinschaft der Bibliotheken in Niedersachsen, Hannover 1996
- Ich war dabei und habe überlebt ISBN 3-00-002062-4, 1997 (5th edition, 2002)
- Die Landespressekonferenz am Puls des Geschehens, LPK, Hannover 1997, ISBN 3-00-002338-0
- Landesverkehrswacht Niedersachsen: 50 Jahre jung – Eine Dokumentation, Landesverkehrswacht Niedersachsen, 2001
- Die CDU in Niedersachsen: eine Chronik, Konrad-Adenauer-Stiftung, Sankt Augustin 2008, ISBN 978-3-940955-28-9
- 60 Jahre Zahnärztekammer Niedersachsen – Eine Chronik 1949-2009, Zahnärztekammer Niedersachsen, 2009
- Walter Hirche – Ein Liberaler aus Niedersachsen, Georg Olms Verlag, 2014, ISBN 978-3-487-08534-0
- Ein starkes Land im Herzen Europas: die CDU in Niedersachsen 1945 bis 2015, Konrad-Adenauer-Stiftung, Sankt Augustin, Berlin 2016, ISBN 978-3-95721-190-3
- Der letzte Zeitzeuge : Ein halbes Jahrhundert hinter der landespolitischen Bühne, ed. by Presse Club Hannover, Olms Verlag, Hildesheim, Zürich, New York 2021, ISBN 978-3-487-08635-4.
