= Ravensburg–Weingarten–Baienfurt tram line =

Former metre-gauge interurban tramway in Baden-Württemberg, Germany

Ravensburg–Weingarten–Baienfurt Tramway
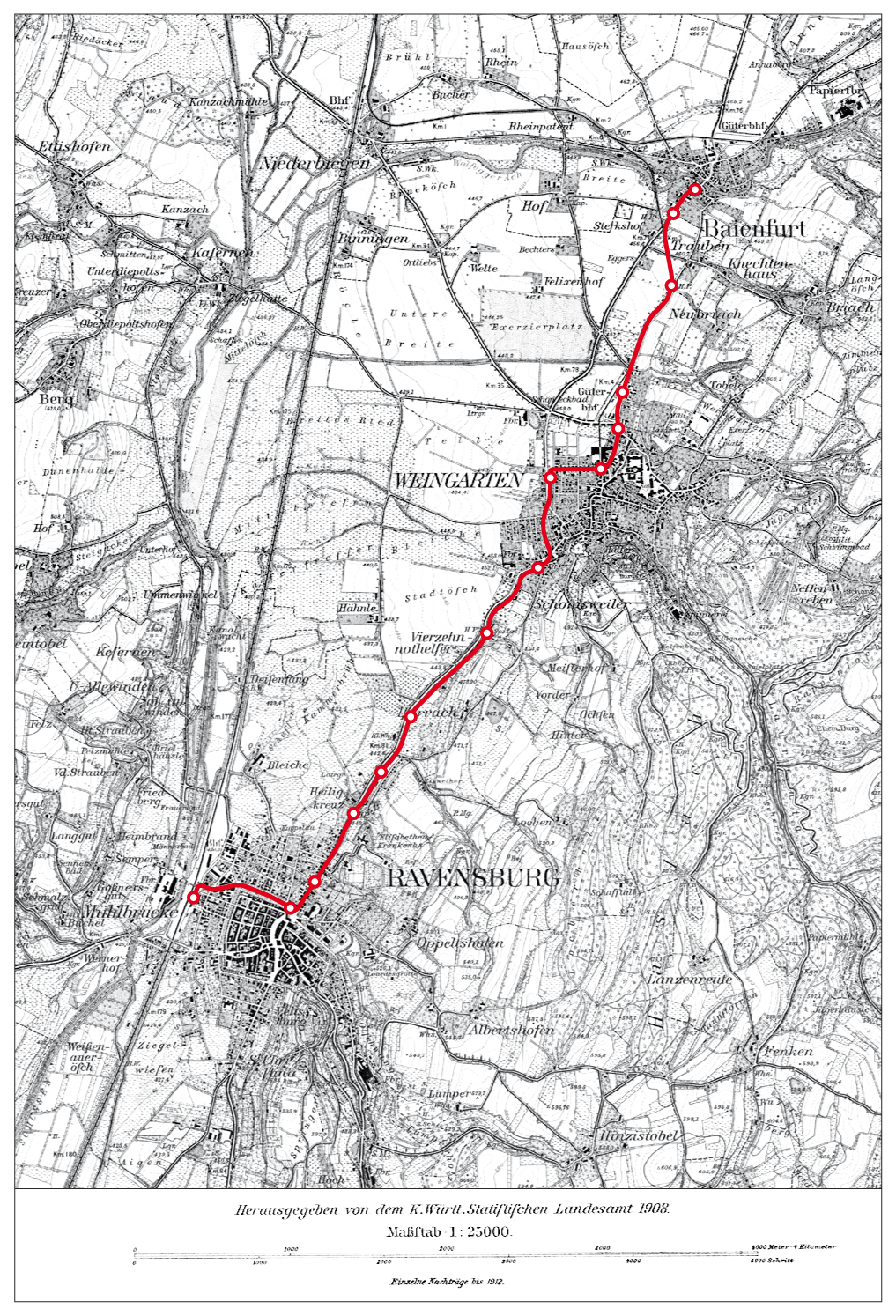

Operation
- Operator: LAG / DR / DB

Infrastructure
- Track gauge: 1,000 mm (3 ft 3 3/8 in) metre gauge
- Electrification: 700, later 750 volts
Overview

The Ravensburg–Weingarten–Baienfurt Tramway – less commonly also Ravensburg–Weingarten–Baienfurt Narrow-Gauge Railway – connected the three named towns until 1959 as a metre-gauge interurban tramway. It was opened in 1888 by the private Lokalbahn Aktien-Gesellschaft (LAG) and initially operated as a steam-powered branch line from Ravensburg to Weingarten. In 1910 it was electrified and in 1911 extended to Baienfurt.

In 1938 the line, popularly known as Zügle, Mühle, Bähnle or Lake Constance Lightning, was nationalized and thereafter, in accordance with the Verordnung über den Bau und Betrieb der Straßenbahnen (BOStrab) that came into force the same year, officially classified as a tramway. After 1938 the route was the only tramway operation owned by the German Reichsbahn, and after World War II the only tramway operation owned by the German Federal Railway.

== History ==
=== Background ===
==== 1849: Altdorf is bypassed ====
As early as November 8, 1847, the Upper Swabian Oberamt town and current district capital Ravensburg was connected from Friedrichshafen to the Southern Railway. On May 26, 1849, this was finally extended to Biberach an der Riß, and on June 29, 1850, Ulm was reached. There the gap was closed with the already existing Fils Valley Railway from Stuttgart. Contrary to the original expectations of the population and business owners, Altdorf – the later Weingarten – did not receive a connection to this important main line of the Royal Württemberg State Railways during the extension northward. On the one hand, the kingdom, which had no coal deposits, wanted to lead its locomotives to Lake Constance in the shortest possible way, and in the short term even threatened to bypass Biberach. On the other hand, the then Altdorf Schultheiß Adolf Prielmayer proved to be a vehement opponent of a direct connection. Consequently, the Southern Railway passed two and a half kilometers west of the town, but the old market towns of Waldsee and Tettnang as well as Baindt and Baienfurt were also not connected at that time.

Compounding the issue was that no railway station was established at the point closest to Altdorf. The current town-center halt Weingarten/Berg was not opened until 1998 by the Bodensee-Oberschwaben-Bahn. This meant that the nearest stations on the Southern Railway from Altdorf were then about four kilometers (Ravensburg) or about three kilometers (Niederbiegen) away. Although Altdorf in 1849 with 3,267 inhabitants was only about half the size of neighboring Ravensburg, the town had long been known regionally as a pilgrimage site due to the Benedictine Abbey of Weingarten and the Basilica of St. Martin.

==== 1865–1888: Weingarten in the transport shadow ====
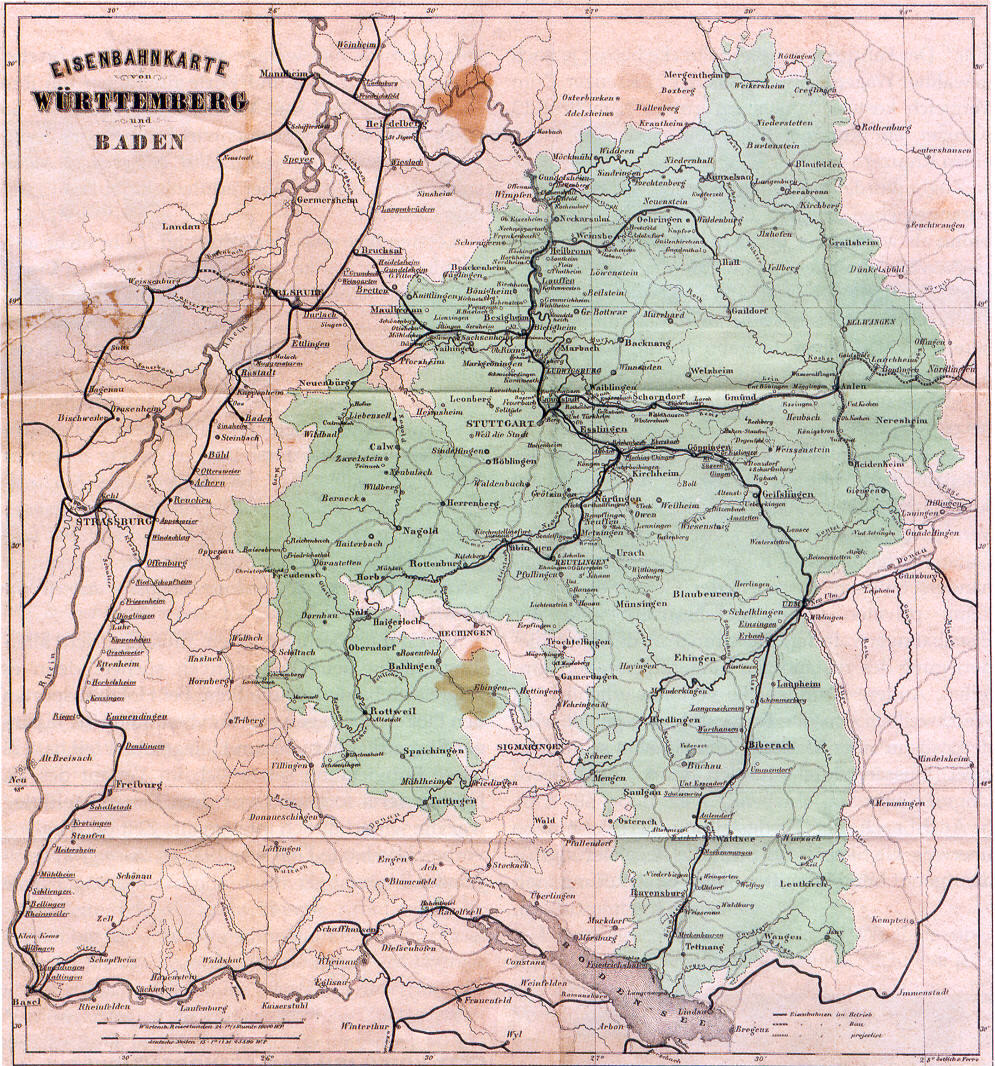
The Württemberg railway network in the 1860s, with the town of Altdorf and Weingarten Abbey separately marked

In 1865 Altdorf adopted the name of the Benedictine abbey and was renamed Weingarten. At the same time, the town was granted city rights. At the same time, Weingarten developed during industrialization into an important industrial location. The Weingarten Machine Factory AG – today's Andritz Schuler Pressen GmbH – founded in 1865, as well as the spinning mill established the following year, played a significant role. Due to the rapid development, the population also increased strongly, so that on December 1, 1880, 5,232 people already lived in the city. The lack of a railway connection therefore had an increasingly unfavorable effect, and unlike Ravensburg, the city continued to remain in the transport shadow. In addition, there was already a corresponding local transport need between Altdorf and Ravensburg at that time. After all, Weingarten had a garrison of 800 men since 1868, but unlike Ravensburg, only a few industrial jobs.

To improve the deficient situation, Weingarten subsequently sought to obtain a connection to the Württemberg state railway through the construction of a stub line designed as a branch line. The driving force was the Weingarten trade association with its active secretary, the Protestant teacher Christoph Klein. In 1879 he was able to win over the Zurich railway engineer Theodor Lutz for the project. Remarkably, the route via Frauentorplatz in Ravensburg was already planned. However, a critical examination by the Weingarten city council found that Klein had calculated technically far too tight radii for his standard gauge line embedded in the road and economically far too high a throughput volume and thus return. Thus the plans remained just that.

After the Kingdom of Württemberg lost interest in the railway, the construction of a private railway was alternatively promoted. Privately operated lines were still a relatively new phenomenon at the time, with only three non-state railways in Württemberg at that time. These were the Kirchheim Railway Company since 1864, the Erms Valley Railway Company since 1873, and the Filder Railway Company since 1884. The railway to Weingarten was to become the fourth private railway in Württemberg.

==== Replanning to a narrow-gauge steam tramway ====
In the spring of 1886, the Augsburg engineers Theodor Lechner and Viktor Krüzner, active in the railway sector from the Lokalbahnbau- und Betriebsunternehmung Lechner & Krüzner, also identified a corresponding transport need between the two rising cities of Ravensburg and Weingarten, which could be met by building a steam tramway. In October 1886 the company therefore submitted an application for a project concession to build the railway to the government of the Kingdom of Württemberg.

In 1887 the two engineers finally presented a concept for a metre-gauge narrow-gauge railway to the city administrations of Ravensburg and Weingarten. It was to run from the Ravensburg station forecourt via Schussenstraße to Frauentorplatz, then straight along the state road Ulm–Friedrichshafen to the Scherzach bridge in Weingarten. There Lechner and Krüzner did not want to follow the sharp bend around the then forestry and current youth house and planned the track from the Stadtösch stop (later Lamm) straight through the orchard of the Sonnenwirt to the terminus at the intersection of Waldseer Straße/Schloßstraße, today Abt-Hyller-Straße or Charlottenplatz. In contrast to the standard-gauge plans that failed a few years earlier, this railway could easily adapt to the given settlement axes. The routing in the public road space also allowed, compared to a usually independently aligned classic railway, lower construction and operating costs.

The concept of Lechner and Krüzner convinced the bourgeois committees of the two involved cities both in terms of technology and return, although more in Weingarten than in Ravensburg, where the railway was always viewed less favorably. The state government in Stuttgart also agreed after recognizing that the new railway posed no serious threat to the utilization of its line between Ravensburg and Aulendorf. This was not a given, because in the kingdom the state had the railway monopoly. If it allowed a private railway, then only on the condition that it could buy back the line after a certain number of operating years, namely at the accumulated investment value.

The conditions around Ravensburg and Weingarten were so acceptable that Lechner and Krüzner were able to win over the powerful Munich railway industrialist Georg Krauß for the project. He was the owner of the Lokomotivfabrik Krauss & Comp., which specialized in local railway locomotives, and saw in the projected line a chance to increase his sales. Thus Lechner, Krüzner and Krauß founded the private Lokalbahn Aktien-Gesellschaft (LAG) on February 9, 1887. This received the building permit for the new railway and was at the same time the client. Construction work began in August 1887, according to another source only on September 3 of the same year. The operating concession was granted by the Württemberg state on November 15, 1887, the concessioning of private railways was then still subject to the respective state law.

=== Early period ===
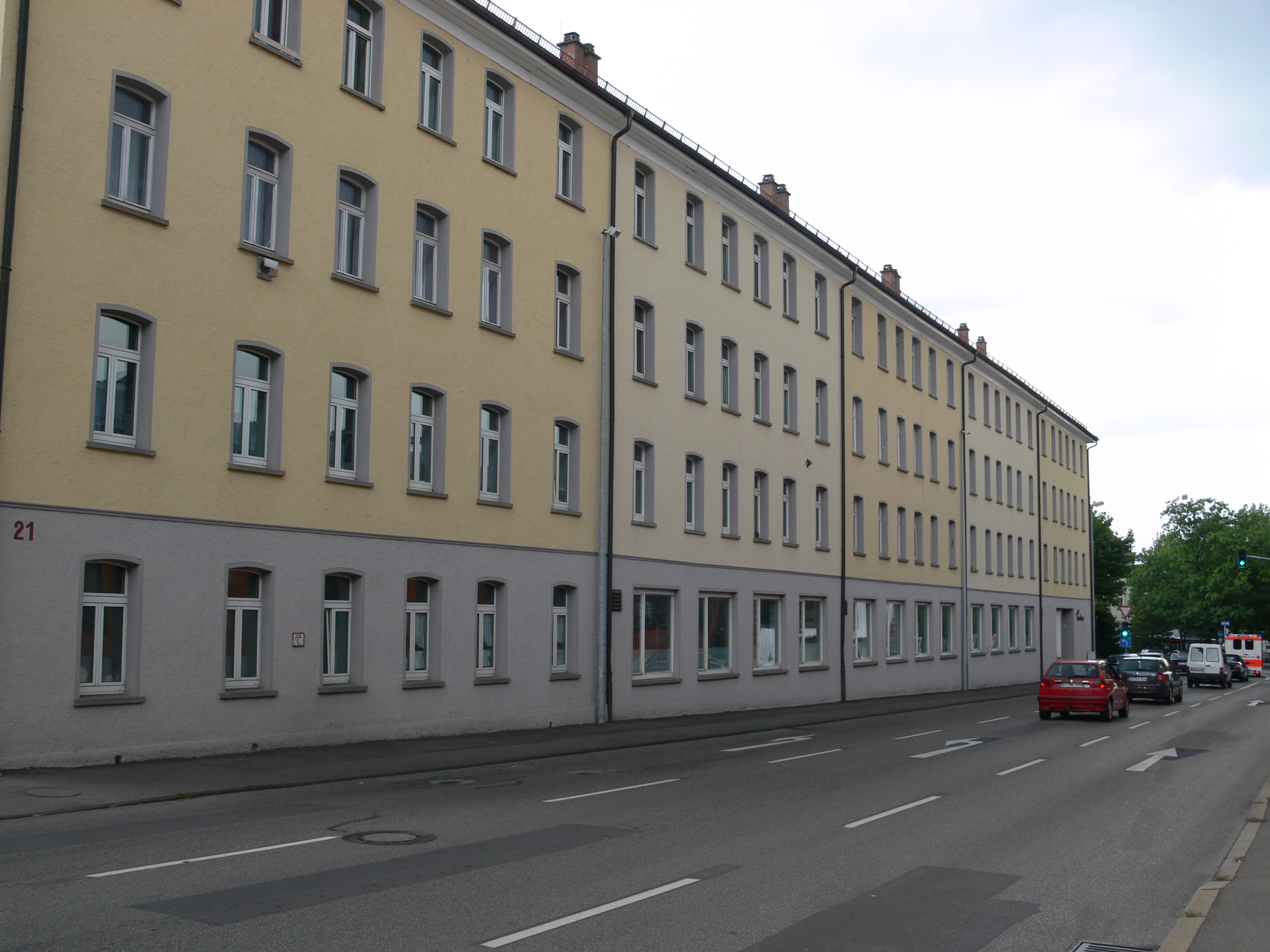
Through Schussenstraße the line ran toward Frauentor. At the machine factory, two overhead line rosettes still testify to this today

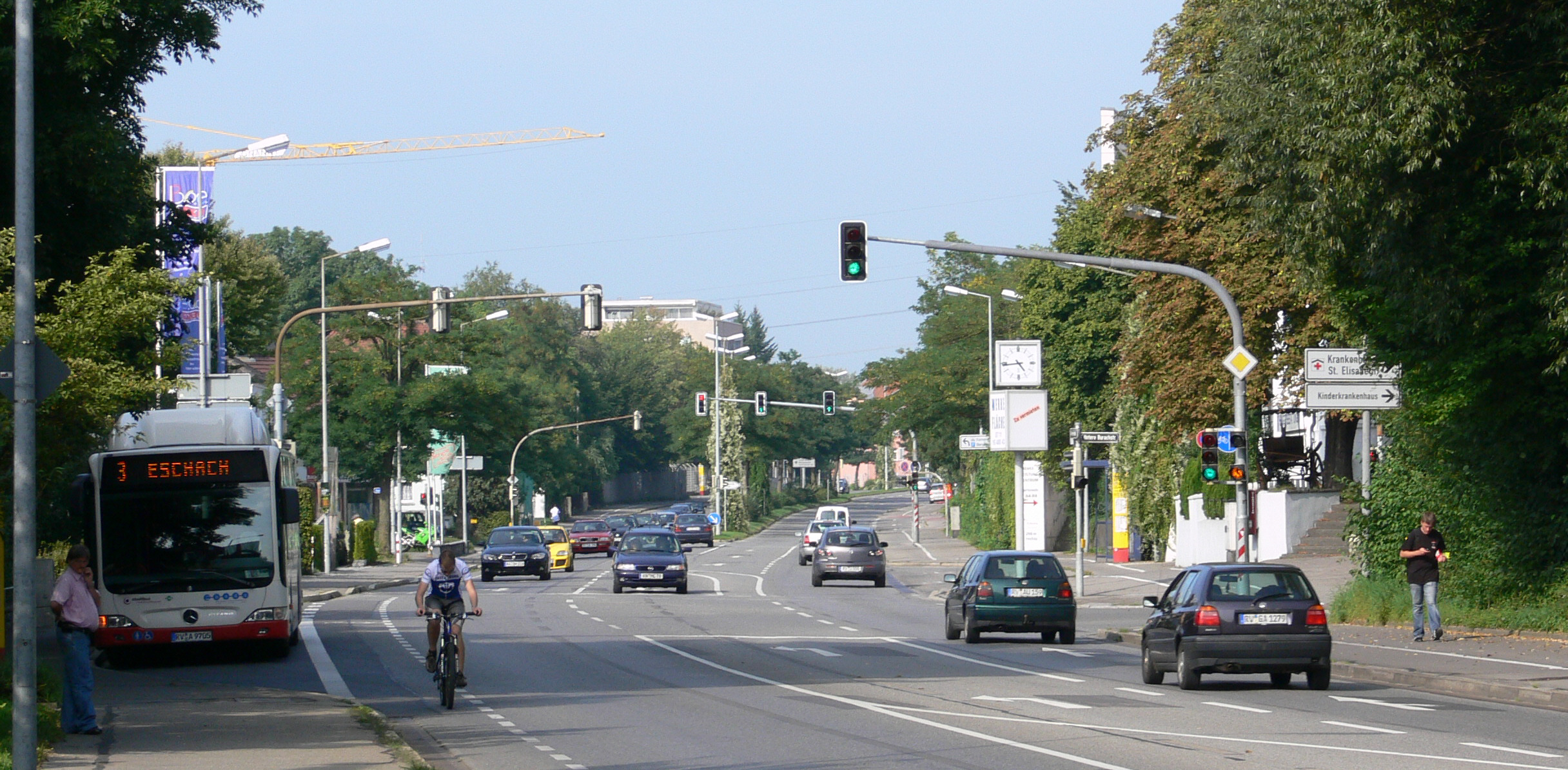
The Heilig Kreuz station at kilometer 1.59 still exists as a bus stop of the same name

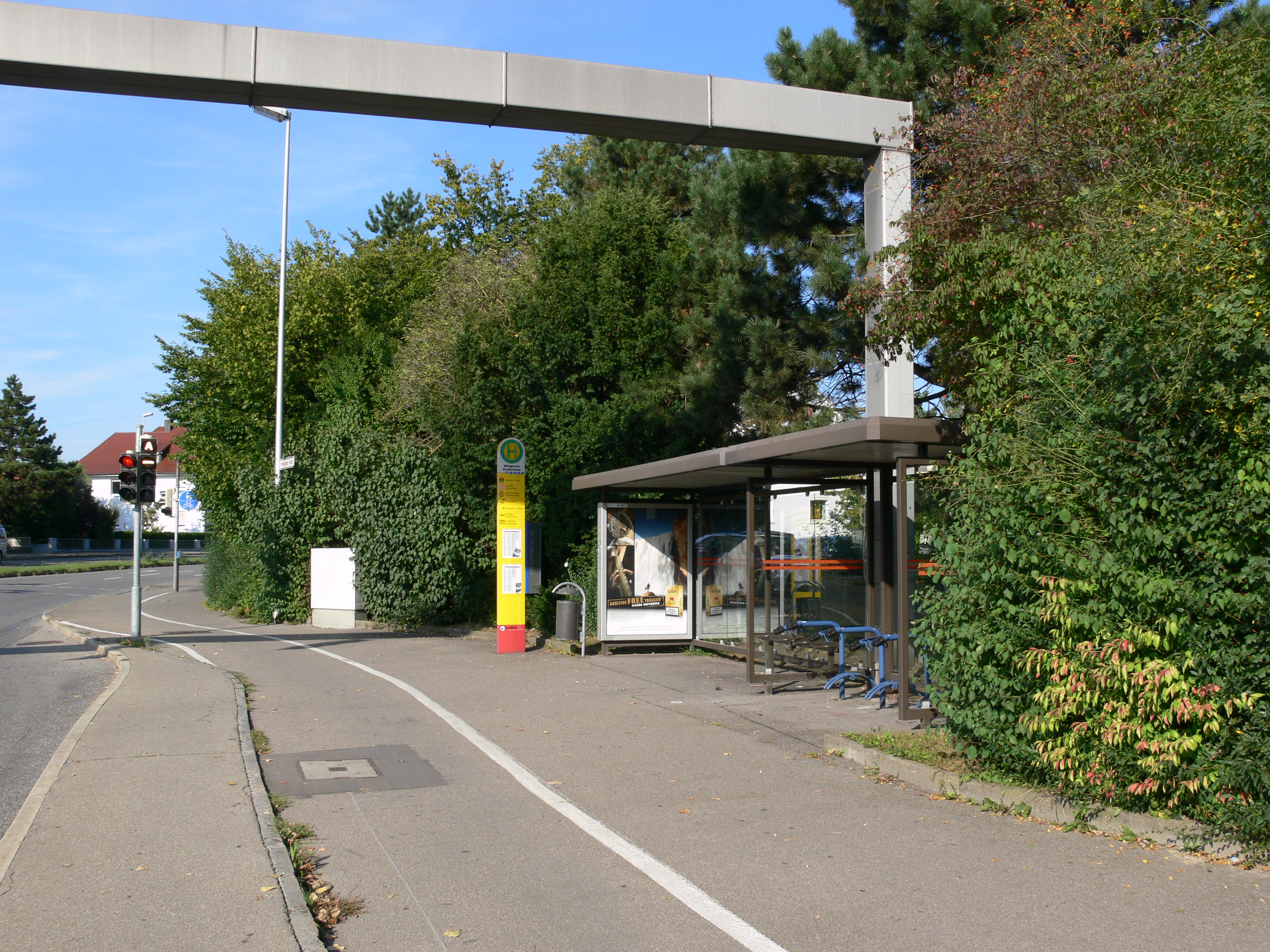
The current Weingarten Hospital bus stop originated from the 14 Nothelfer station, where the bus bay was previously a passing loop

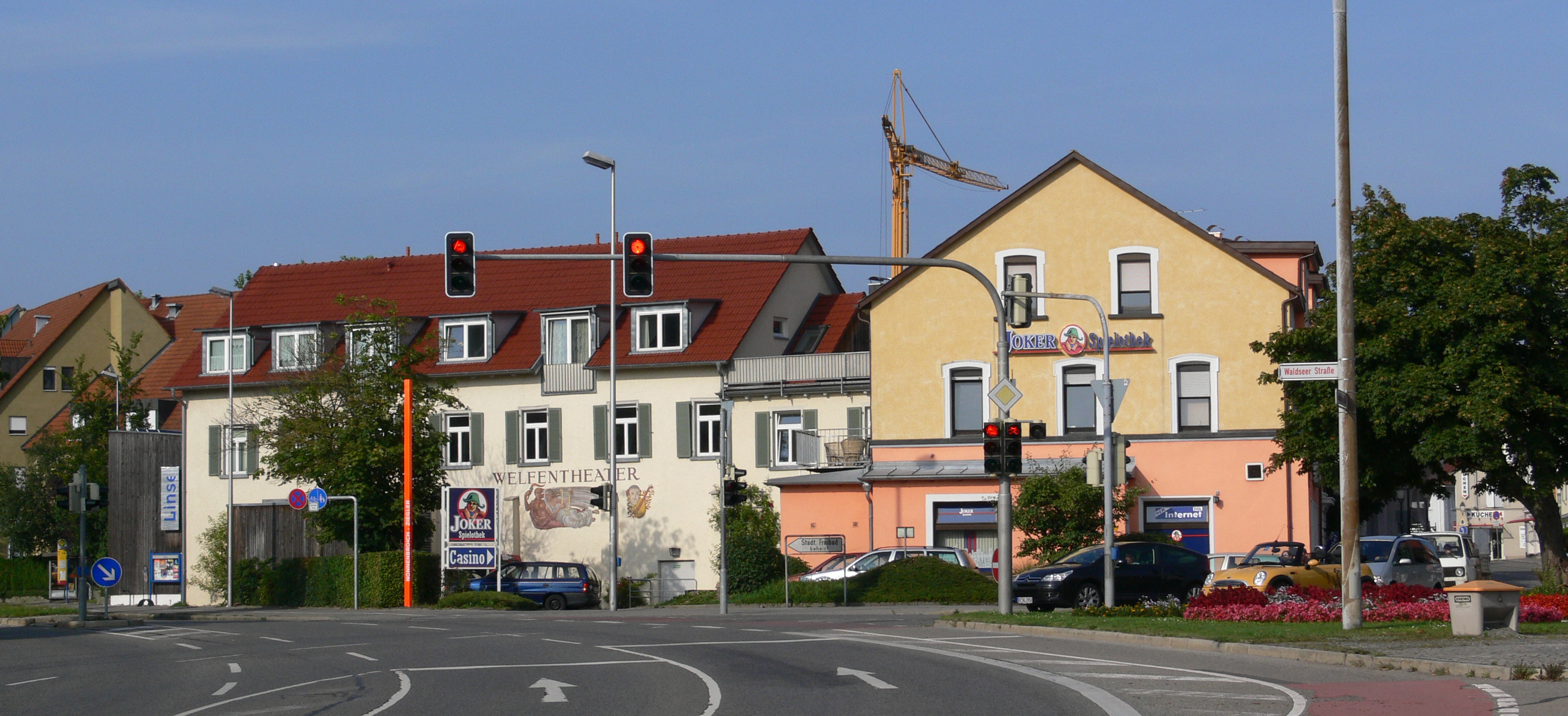
In Weingarten the line turned left after the Scherzach bridge and followed the current Waldseer Straße northward

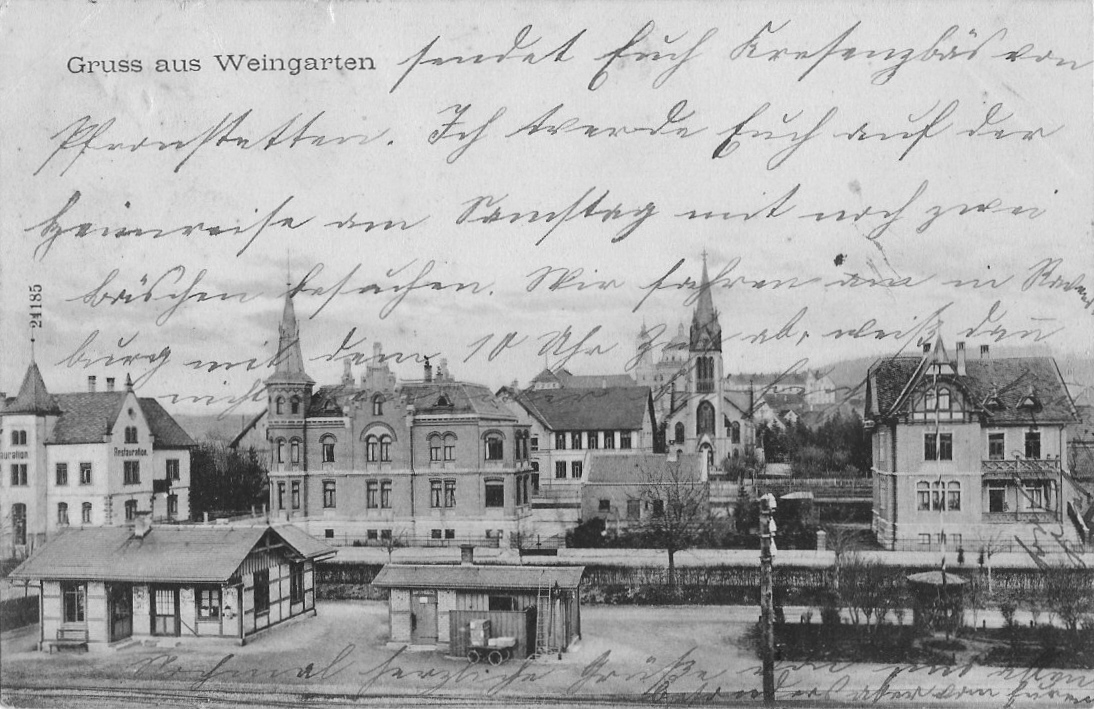
The Weingarten town terminus around 1905

==== Opening ====
The new railway to Weingarten was actually supposed to be solemnly inaugurated on December 22, 1887, but the track was not yet completed. When this was done by the next selected date of December 29, 1887, it could not be inspected by the responsible official from Stuttgart because a snowstorm had buried it centimeters deep. Thus passenger traffic could finally be started only on January 6, 1888, with no opening celebration scheduled. Operations ran from 6:50 a.m. to 10:10 p.m. A lunch break for the staff was taken into account, so that a total of eleven trips were offered. The journey over the entire route took 20 minutes and cost 20 pfennigs in third class on wooden seats for adults and ten pfennigs for children up to ten years. Children under three years were allowed to travel free if they did not claim their own seat. Tickets were valid for one day each, for the round trip the double price had to be paid. Use of the second class equipped with upholstered seats was in turn half more expensive and was mainly reserved for the officers of the Weingarten garrison and their relatives. Tickets were only available in Weingarten at the ticket counter, at the other stations they were sold by the train conductor. In addition, some merchants and inns in both Ravensburg and Weingarten served as additional sales points.

The start of public freight transport followed, over half a year after commissioning, on August 15, 1888. The LAG transported the freight mainly in the existing half-luggage cars, the few freight cars were rarely used. The permanent way consisted of vignole rails with a metre weight of 24.77 kilograms. Larger civil engineering structures were not required, which also explains the short construction time of the route. The operations management and the railway depot were located in Weingarten.

The 4.18-kilometer connection was the first route of the newly founded LAG, the field railway that had existed since 1879 did not join the LAG until 1891. The awarding of the concession to the Bavarian LAG was remarkable in that it concentrated almost all further activities on Bavaria. However, only a few years after the commissioning of the steam tramway, the LAG established a second foothold in the Upper Swabia region when it opened the Meckenbeuren–Tettnang railway only about ten kilometers south of Ravensburg in 1895.

Technically, the former steam tramway to Weingarten largely corresponded to the still steam-operated Chiemsee Railway, even though it runs throughout on its own alignment. The Chiemsee Railway was opened on July 9, 1887, only a few months before the Weingarten route. It still uses a locomotive identical in design to the machines used in Upper Swabia at the time.

The new route was soon so well frequented, especially in third class, that the horse omnibus introduced shortly before, although it granted a five-pfennig discount on the return journey, soon ceased again. The Weingarten city administration tried shortly after the start of operations to introduce another trip for schoolchildren returning from Ravensburg. However, this was rejected by the LAG with reference to the necessary rest time for the locomotive driver, the fireman and the conductor. The staff initially drove the whole day without shift change, also with the same locomotive, while the other was initially kept only for emergencies.

==== Route description ====
The lines to Weingarten – and later to Baienfurt – departed from the Ravensburg station square, the LAG station was officially called Ravensburg state station to distinguish it from the existing Ravensburg station. Boarding the cars was from the sidewalk side opposite the state railway station building, the former stop was directly in front of the main post office. The steam tramway initially ran parallel to the Southern Railway for about 100 meters northward, then turning in a sharp 90-degree curve eastward at the current bus station. Through Schussenstraße it reached the Frauentor stop at kilometer 0.83 located at the "Green Tower". Due to its immediate proximity to the Ravensburg old town, it was the second most frequented stop after the starting stop. After passing another 90-degree curve on Frauentorplatz, the route turned northward again and followed Gartenstraße toward Weingarten.

The rails in Gartenstraße were laid on the right side of the road when leaving the city. In the Ravensburg city area they were initially laid in the road surface, in the outer area then on their own alignment right next to the road. Gartenstraße was formerly the most important transport axis of the region, it was part of the then Württemberg state road 49. This was associated especially in later years with correspondingly heavy motor vehicle traffic. Another stop on Ravensburg city territory followed along Gartenstraße, called Ravensburg Heiligkreuz. The name comes from the former Heilig Kreuz Inn, which in turn was named after the Lazar house Heilig Kreuz demolished in 1826. The stop was particularly important for the transport connection of the neighboring St. Elisabeth Hospital.

At kilometer 2.46 – at the level of the current Ravensburg district of Burach, which was then still written Burrach – the line passed the boundary to the neighboring city of Weingarten and continued to follow the state road now called Ravensburger Straße. The route in the area before and after the municipal boundary then ran through largely undeveloped land, with a settlement gap of about two kilometers still existing between the two cities in 1908. Furthermore, the connecting road was not yet developed at that time, only in the years 1916 to 1926 was it paved between Ravensburg and Weingarten as well.

About half a kilometer after the municipal boundary the line reached the 14 Nothelfer stop, the first of a total of three stations on Weingarten territory. It was named after the hospital to the Fourteen Holy Helpers, in front of whose entrance the stop was located. As the only stop of the steam tramway, this stop had no place prefix, because the namesake hospital – as a former leper colony – was then still somewhat outside the built-up area of Weingarten.

Subsequently, after about 500 meters the lines reached the southern edge of Weingarten, where the Weingarten Scherzachbrücke stop was located. Shortly thereafter the alignment crossed the Scherzach together with the road. After the bridge the line turned left, crossed Ravensburger Straße and ran through then still undeveloped land northward. The route alignment in this area corresponded to the current Waldseer Straße, which however was only realigned in later years in adaptation to the railway line. At the junction of the street now called Promenade the line reached the state road toward Ulm again and followed it on the left side. Subsequently the route passed the depot of the line and soon reached the Weingarten town terminus. It was located somewhat south of the then Charlottenstraße, the current Abt-Hyller-Straße.

The route was throughout single track, train crossings could take place at the two passing loops Ravensburg Heiligkreuz, which however was only installed later, and 14 Nothelfer. This was sufficient, as the steam tramway was operated with only two train sets.

==== Railway or tramway – attempt at clarification ====
Legally, at the opening of the route treated here there was in the Kingdom of Württemberg – unlike for example in neighboring Bavaria, in Prussia or in Saxony – no differentiation between a tramway and a railway. Thus the route treated here was initially legally a railway – for the simple reason that the then Württemberg laws did not yet explicitly know tramways. Nevertheless, the term tramway was of course also known in Württemberg. And independent of the described legal situation it was used not only colloquially but also officially. Nevertheless, the LAG itself did not commit, rather it referred to its Ravensburg operation sometimes as local railway and sometimes as tramway. For example, the first fare regulations of December 1, 1887 are still headed Lokalbahn Ravensburg–Weingarten, on the timetable of December 1, 1920 however already Strassenbahn Ravensburg–Weingarten–Baienfurt.

Even in later years this legal gray area led to definition problems, for example Wolfgang Hendlmeier writes, that the route was mostly listed in the statistics for railways, except in the years 1933 to 1938. In his opinion the distinction was often made arbitrarily.

=== After the turn of the century ===
==== Weingarten continues to grow ====
In the long term the narrow-gauge branch line could no longer satisfy the increasing transport demand, especially because the population of Weingarten continued to rise rapidly, a development that in turn was accelerated by the significantly improved transport connection since 1888. Thus on December 1, 1900, 6,678 people lived in the town, while on December 1, 1910 there were already 8,077 inhabitants. The workforce of the machine factory also increased accordingly, from just under 50 in the opening year of the railway to 710 in 1913. Of these, 78 alone commuted daily from Ravensburg, whereby the railway as a technical innovation enabled the separation of residence and workplace in the first place.

In addition to the increased demand in passenger transport, the – albeit quite sparse – freight transport by narrow-gauge railway proved problematic at the time. On the one hand, the goods had to be laboriously transshipped from narrow gauge to standard gauge at Ravensburg state station, on the other hand the goods from Weingarten had to be transported through the middle of Ravensburg city center beforehand. Above all, however, the desired expansion of rail freight transport was not possible with the existing infrastructure.

1889	1890	1891	1892	1893	1894	1895	1896	1897	1898	1899	1900	1901	1902	1903	1904	1905	1906	1907	1908	1909	1910
719	679	816	1371	1524	1859	1988	2387	2660	2400	2210	2277	2020	2231	2439	2656	2790	3035	3078	3000	3000	2673

This table according to Kolb shows the development of freight transport with the narrow-gauge railway. Shown is the annual transport performance in tonnes, excluding luggage items. Notes: no figure for the opening year 1888, the figures for the years 1908 and 1909 are estimates, no figure also for 1911 (last year of narrow-gauge freight transport). The continuous increase in freight volume over the years is clearly visible. At around 3,000 tonnes annually (first exceeded in 1906), however, the performance limit of the narrow-gauge railway was reached.

==== Baienfurt also develops into an industrial location ====
Furthermore, in those years the northern neighboring town of Baienfurt, with a certain delay to Weingarten, also developed into an industrial location. When the Southern Railway was extended northward from Ravensburg in 1849, Baienfurt had just 800 inhabitants. Accordingly, the town was considered as little in the alignment at the time as Altdorf. But in later years industrialization also ensured corresponding growth of the town in Baienfurt. At the center of this development was the Baienfurt paper mill built from 1870 to 1873, which remained the largest employer in the town until its closure in 2009.

Baienfurt was thus around the turn of the century in a similar situation as Weingarten until 1888. The nearest station on the Southern Railway – Niederbiegen station – was two and a half kilometers from the town center, and the terminus of the steam tramway in Weingarten was also just under two and a half kilometers away. This created an urgent desire in Baienfurt for an improvement in the transport situation, especially because the drays of the paper mill could not keep up with the wood supply or the removal of the finished paper via Niederbiegen.

==== Ravensburg expands northward ====
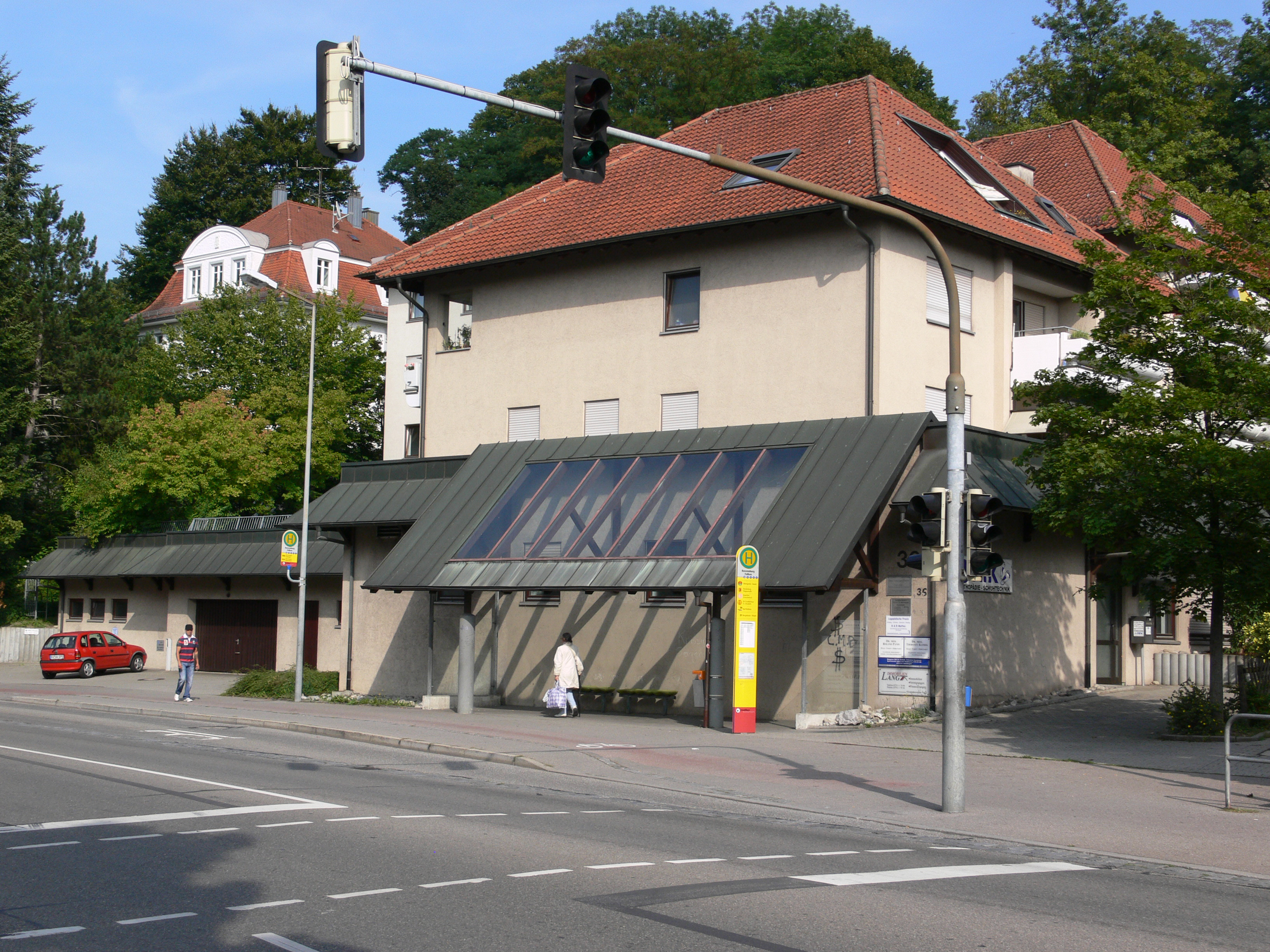
The Falken stop was established in 1910 on the occasion of electrification

In the years around the turn of the century Ravensburg also grew steadily, increasing the population from 10,550 in 1880 to 15,594 in 1910. But since only limited living space was available in the core city, this led to an expansion of the built-up area, including northward. There the Nordstadt district was created on the road toward Weingarten, and the existing hamlet Burrach was also upgraded to a district. Thus the branch line to Weingarten increasingly gained importance for intra-city traffic in Ravensburg as well. To meet the changed needs, however, new stops first had to be established – until then the line in the section north of the core city served only the Ravensburg Heiligkreuz stop. The steam tramway would however have been only conditionally suitable for this, as every additional stop was associated with a lengthy starting process and would thus have led to corresponding journey time extensions on the entire route.

==== Expansion plans ====
To further improve the transport situation for the three involved towns, it was therefore decided just over twenty years after its opening to comprehensively expand the infrastructure of the branch line. In addition to the extension northward and the establishment of new stops in Ravensburg, electrification was also considered, as operating a steam-powered railway through built-up street areas was already considered outdated at the time. In addition to the existing inner-city route through Ravensburg, this applied especially in view of the intended northern extension. This was also to run through the middle of the town center of Weingarten, even directly past the basilica. In addition, electric traction was advantageous for the intended shortening of stop distances in the Ravensburg Nordstadt; because this way the time losses occurring during starting processes could be kept within limits.

The LAG was considered a pioneer around the turn of the century regarding the electrification of railway lines in Germany. It was able to gather experience with electric railway operation early on five of its lines:

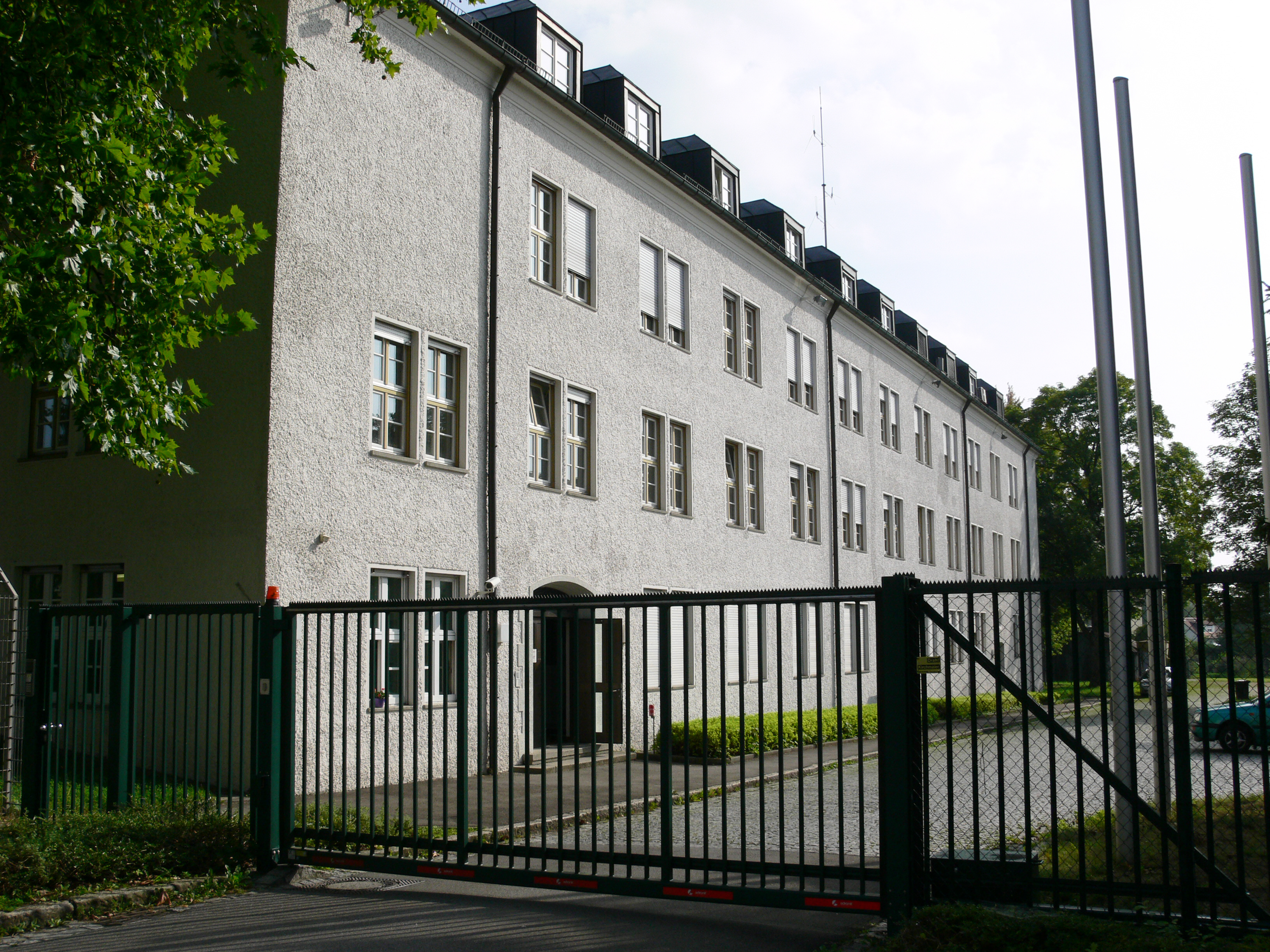
A new stop with passing loop was also created at the Ravensburg power plant in 1910

- Meckenbeuren–Tettnang (opened 1895, electrified from the start)
- Türkheim–Wörishofen (opened 1896, electrified from the start, operated by the LAG since 1905)
- Bad Aibling–Feilnbach (opened 1897, electrified from the start)
- Isar Valley Railway (electrified 1900)
- Murnau–Oberammergau (electrified 1905, albeit with alternating current)

Furthermore, electric tramways had already been established in numerous German cities at this time, in the state capital Stuttgart since 1895, in nearby Ulm since 1897. Thus it was only consistent to also convert the steam tramway to Weingarten to electric traction.

The technical questions appeared less problematic than the legal ones. Particular attention had to be paid to the electricity monopoly of the Württembergische Gesellschaft für Elektrizitätswerke (WGE), a subsidiary of the Maschinenfabrik Esslingen, which in turn was strongly connected to the state. After years of negotiations a compromise was reached that was significant for the vehicles to be procured. Exceptionally, the LAG was allowed to build its own power station for its traction current in the WGE area. As compensation it had to have its railcars built in Esslingen and not by its court supplier MAN. However, Esslingen then had little experience with electric vehicles, so special designs according to the latest plans had to be produced for the LAG, which ultimately proved absolutely operationally reliable.

The modernization and expansion of the infrastructure took place step by step. Parallel to the expansion of the narrow-gauge railway, the new construction of the standard-gauge Niederbiegen–Weingarten railway as well as the also standard-gauge Abzw Baienfurt West–Baienfurt Gbf railway was planned. The two new lines were to take over the freight transport to and from Weingarten from the narrow-gauge railway on the one hand and on the other hand bring Baienfurt a connection to rail-bound freight transport in its history for the first time. On August 21, 1909, the Württemberg state finally granted the concession for the extension. In contrast, the two standard-gauge lines were only approved on May 14, 1910.

=== Failed development of the city center and southern district ===
Before the electrification there were concrete plans to also develop the Ravensburg old town as well as the new districts that were extending more and more southward by rail. To lead these over the current Marienplatz, even a breakthrough of the city-owned building yard was planned, which then still served as a schoolhouse. Ultimately, however, the project failed not due to the loss of at least two classrooms, but due to the LAG's realization that both the route through Eisenbahnstraße and through Bachstraße would have had unacceptable narrow points and gradients. Apparently no one in the Ravensburg magistrate had considered what noise pollution the railway in these narrow, highly built-up street canyons would have caused to the residents until late at night.

=== Modernization and expansion in 1910 and 1911 ===
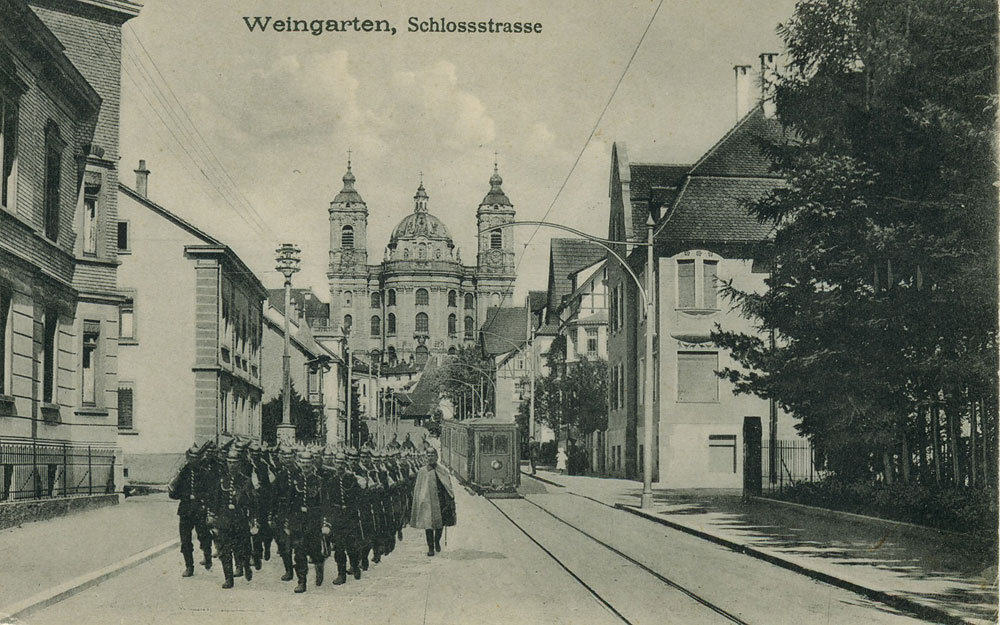
Since 1910 the line also ran directly past the basilica toward Weingarten freight station

==== Electrification, first extension and new stops ====
Electric operations started on September 1, 1910, although steam operations were not finally discontinued until September 1911. As the voltage of the electric supply, initially 700 volts direct current was chosen, only in later years was it increased to 750 volts. For feeding the overhead line a substation was built halfway along. At the same time as the electrification the permanent way was modernized and the route extended by 950 meters and three new stops. The line now led to the northern edge of Weingarten, the provisional terminus was on the station forecourt of the freight station under construction. The freight station itself however was only commissioned the following year. Furthermore, about 300 meters of existing route in Weingarten were realigned.

Coming from Ravensburg the line now crossed Waldseer Straße at the junction of Promenade and followed this – now aligned on the right side – to the current Charlottenplatz. The previous Weingarten town terminus on the left side of Waldseer Straße was abandoned. It was replaced by the new Weingarten Charlottenstraße stop on the right side of Waldseer Straße. The new station was in the green area at the current Weingarten Charlottenplatz bus stop (outbound) and was designed as a passing loop. Directly after that the new alignment then turned sharply right in a 90-degree angle and continued initially eastward through Charlottenstraße – the current Abt-Hyller-Straße. After 500 meters directly at the Basilica of St. Martin, where the new Weingarten Post stop was located, the route turned again sharply north in a 90-degree angle. From here it reached after passing the Weingarten Traube stop finally the provisional Weingarten freight station terminus.

At the Weingarten freight station the new operational center of the line was also built. A about 40-meter-long three-track car hall with additional stabling tracks in front of and next to the hall as well as a six-part building with service apartments for the then about 70 employees of the line were created. The latter was at Baienfurter Straße 22–32 and was in the same architectural style as the freight station building. The old depot of the steam tramway on Waldseer Straße was abandoned in 1910. Parallel to this, as planned, three new stops were also established in Ravensburg in the area of the existing route:

Stop	km	Designation
Ravensburg Falken	1.10	After the former Falken Inn, Gartenstraße 30.
Kraftwerk	2.14	After the former Ravensburg power plant, today seat of the Tübingen Regional Council – Ravensburg branch.
Unterburach	2.50	In adaptation to the then hamlet Burrach (current district Burach). This however lies somewhat off the alignment and also about 30 meters higher.

Of these, the Kraftwerk stop was designed as another passing possibility, so in 1910 a total of four meeting possibilities were available: Ravensburg Heilig Kreuz, Kraftwerk, 14 Nothelfer and Weingarten Charlottenstraße. The Unterburach stop was already on Weingarten municipal territory, yet it served the development of the hamlet Burrach belonging to Ravensburg. Because both Kraftwerk and Unterburach were then still in open field, they – like the 14 Nothelfer station already in 1888 – both received no place prefix.

Through the new electric vehicles the total capacity per train increased from 300 to 752 persons, thus the line was also equipped for peak traffic to the Blood Friday and the Rutenfest. From the electrification also came the nickname Mühle for the entire line. It referred to the controller operated by the driver, which looked like the crank of a coffee grinder.

==== Second extension – Baienfurt is reached ====
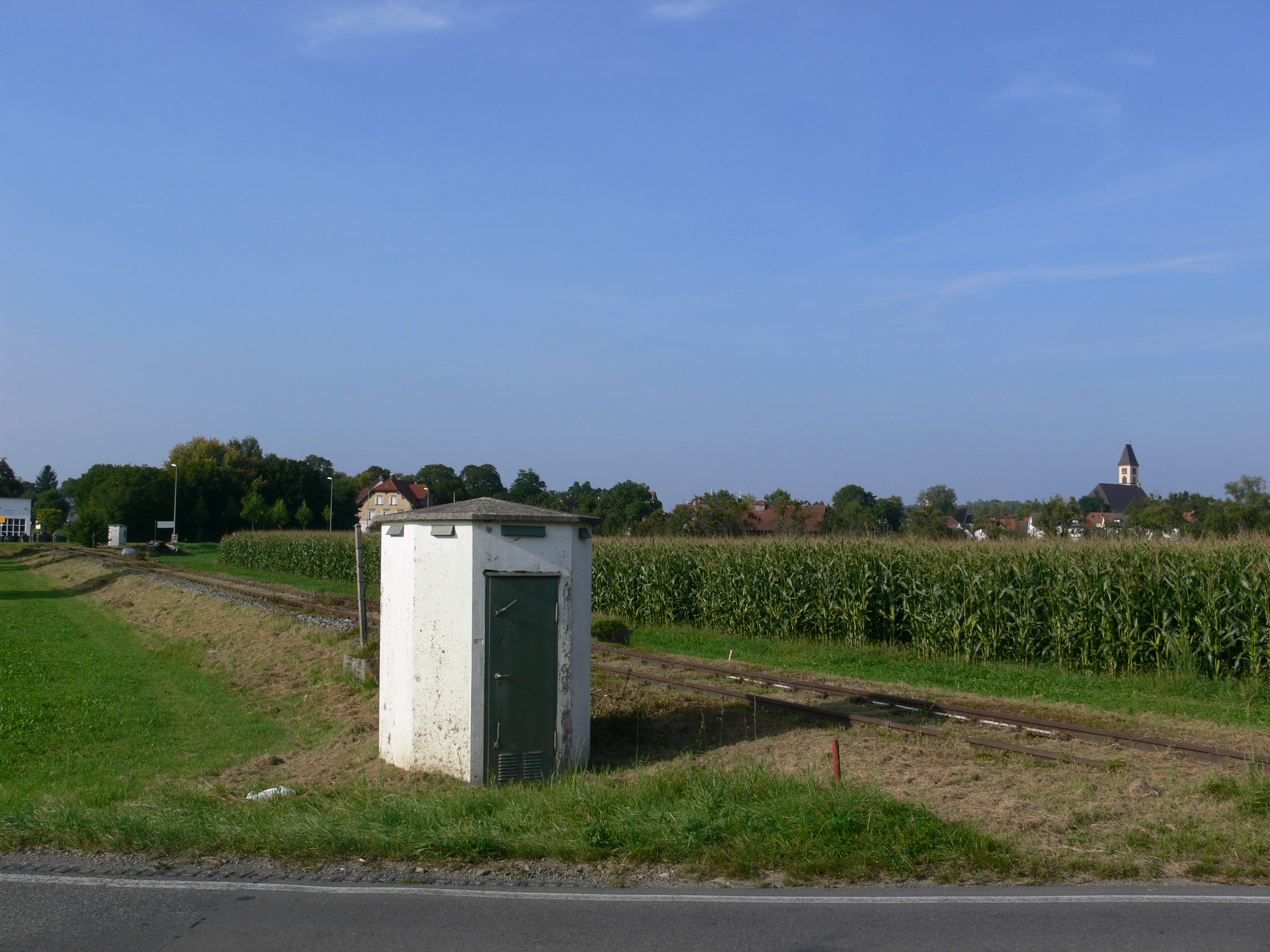
In this area was formerly the three-rail track. Before the level crossing on the left edge of the picture the metre-gauge track branched off to the right toward Baienfurt town

A little over a year later the second extension between Weingarten freight station and the northern neighboring town of Baienfurt could also be opened. The new route was built together with the standard-gauge Niederbiegen–Weingarten railway and therefore partly executed as three-rail track. The new metre-gauge section went into operation on September 13, 1911 and was served from the start exclusively in passenger transport. Operations began at 5:45 a.m. and ended at 11:45 p.m. after a total of 66 trips. The ceremonial opening with parades, speeches and music performances finally took place on October 12, 1911.

The new terminus, called Baienfurt town to distinguish it from the Baienfurt freight station located further north, was only about 250 meters from the historic center of Baienfurt. It was immediately south of the bridge over the Wolfegger Ach, at the current Baienfurt Achtalschule bus stop. The route length thereby increased to a total of 6.56 kilometers, of which however only the last 180 meters were on Baienfurt municipal territory. The short-term Weingarten freight station terminus was henceforth the fifth passing loop on the still completely single-track route. After 1911 only entering or departing trains ended or started there.

==== The Traubenhof halt ====
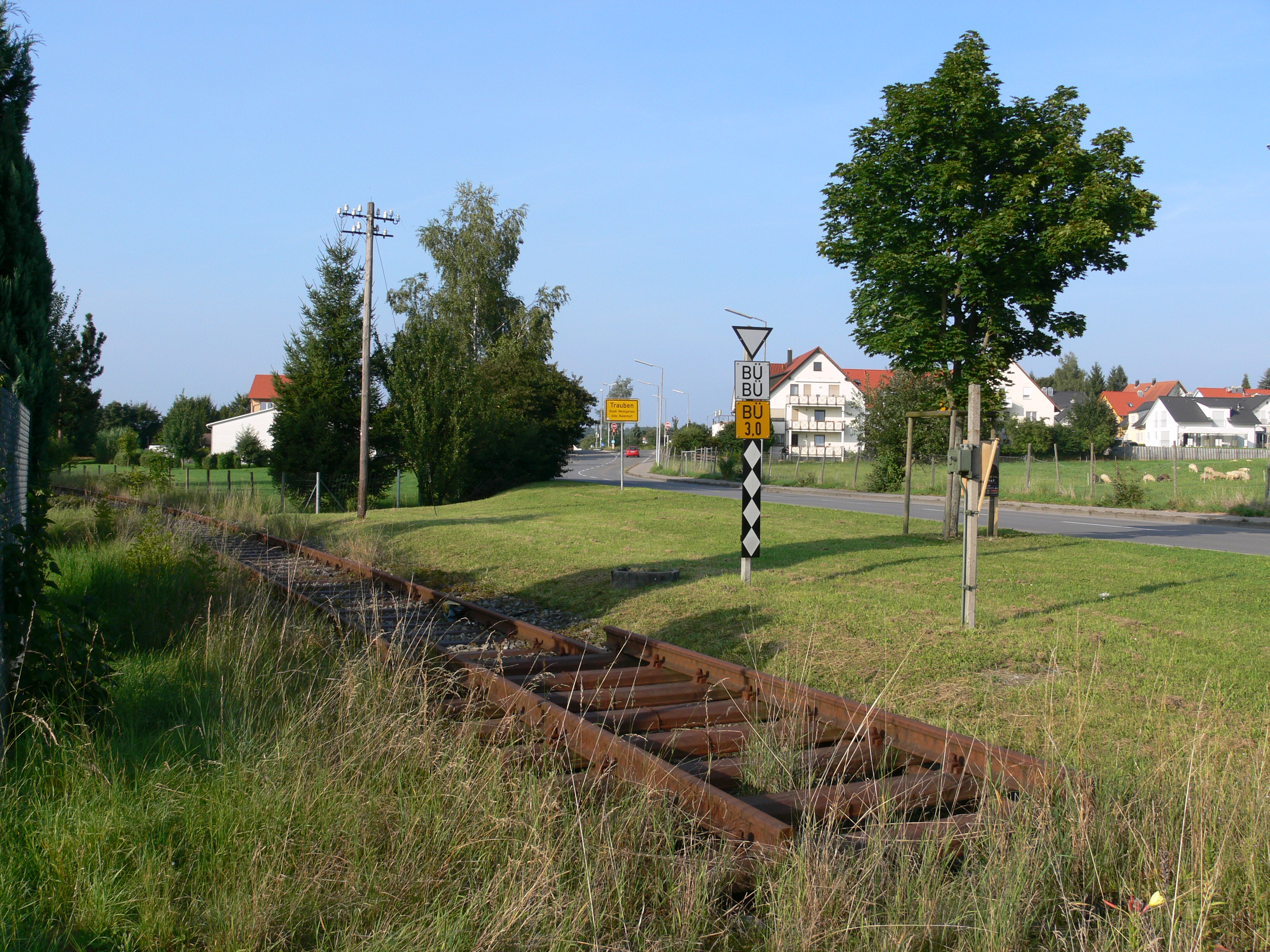
At the former Traubenhof halt, in the background the namesake hamlet Trauben

In the course of the extension to Baienfurt an additional intermediate station was established about 200 meters south of the hamlet Trauben belonging to Weingarten. This was then still in open field. The halt called Traubenhof also served the better development of the neighboring hamlets Neubriach, Knechtenhaus, Briach and Köpfingen belonging to Baienfurt. The designation Traubenhof is a creation of the LAG, because the associated hamlet was officially called Trauben even in 1911. This was to avoid confusion with the simultaneously opened Weingarten Traube stop. This was only corrected in December 2007 when the corresponding bus stop was renamed from Weingarten Traubenhof to Weingarten Trauben. The Weingarten Traube bus stop had already been abandoned some time ago, so confusion is now excluded. Furthermore, the Traubenhof halt never carried the place prefix Weingarten during the operating times of the railway, although it already belonged to the city area of Weingarten. The prefix was only introduced with the later bus service. The reason was to avoid irritations for non-local passengers whose destination was one of the four hamlets belonging to Baienfurt.

==== Abandonment of narrow-gauge freight transport ====
With the commissioning of the Niederbiegen–Weingarten standard-gauge line on October 1, 1911, freight transport by narrow-gauge railway could finally be abandoned as planned. The goods for the machine factory and the other freight customers in Weingarten were henceforth delivered directly with standard-gauge freight cars from Niederbiegen. This measure proved a complete success: While the narrow-gauge railway transported just 2,673 tonnes of freight in 1910, it was already 111,594 tonnes of freight on the standard-gauge railway in 1914. This corresponds to an increase by more than forty times, although the goods to and from Baienfurt were now also included.

==== Operations on the three-rail track ====
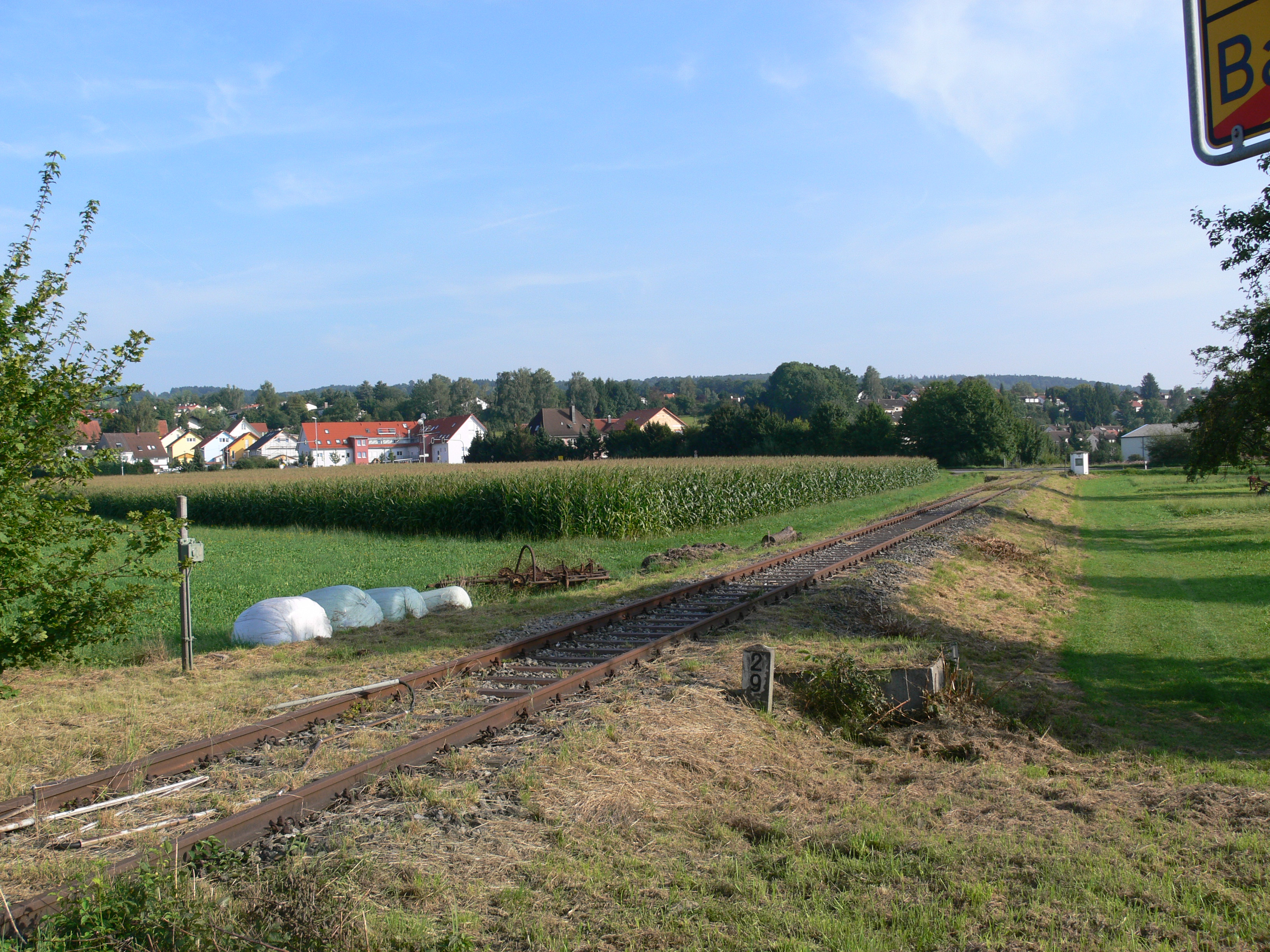
At the southern town exit of Baienfurt the metre gauge coming from the left from Baienfurt town merged into the standard gauge

The characteristic of the line became the three-rail track in the course of the newly opened route section. The relevant section was just under one kilometer long and was located between the exit from Weingarten freight station and the southern edge of Baienfurt. In the direction of Baienfurt the right rail was used by both gauges. This was expedient in two respects: On the one hand because the platform edge of the Traubenhof halt was also on the right side and on the other hand because only two instead of four frogs had to be installed. Between the start of standard-gauge freight transport to Weingarten on October 1, 1911 and the cessation of the tram residual operations on the northern section on June 30, 1959, both metre-gauge electric passenger trains and steam-powered standard-gauge freight trains, occasionally also passenger trains, operated in this area on the same track. The section was thereby double route kilometered, that is for the tram from south to north and for the standard gauge in the opposite direction. Consequently, the three-rail track later also had two separate VzG line numbers, namely 4522 for the tram and 4520 for the railway. Legally, after 1938 the tramways in the area of this short subsection also continued to operate under the Eisenbahn-Bau- und Betriebsordnung (EBO) and not as on the other route sections under the then newly introduced BOStrab.

The common route section was secured with the help of a special signal board, there was no stationary railway signaling. Only the train whose staff was in possession of the only existing signal board was allowed to enter the route section. Train movements on the standard-gauge line had to be announced by telephone to the operations management in Weingarten. The operations manager there only gave approval if he had the signal board in front of him. This principle is similar to the train staff system often used in the past on single-track tram lines, as it is still applied today for example on the Kirnitzsch Valley Tramway.

Furthermore, the electric vehicles on the Ravensburg–Weingarten–Baienfurt route were equipped with classic railway railway tires. These were somewhat wider than those commonly used on trams. This ensured that they could also pass the section with the three-rail track without problems. This applied in particular to the two frogs at the merging or diverging points.

==== No competition from the standard gauge ====
Although the non-electrified standard-gauge line from Niederbiegen to Weingarten was primarily built for freight traffic, from 1914 it also occasionally operated scheduled passenger trains. These ran in addition to the electric narrow-gauge trains to Ravensburg and allowed passengers traveling toward Ulm or the state capital Stuttgart a shorter connection than via Ravensburg. However, this traffic remained very sparse throughout the years, with passenger numbers always far behind those of the electric narrow-gauge railway. For example, in 1914 only 16,519 people were transported on the standard-gauge railway, compared to 839,865 passengers on the narrow-gauge railway in the same year. Even in later years, the Niederbiegen line never became serious competition for the electrified line to Ravensburg. Passenger service on the freight railway was suspended at times, for example from 1922 to 1925. In 1938, it was finally discontinued altogether.

==== First World War ====
After passenger numbers exceeded the million mark in the last year of peace, 1913, the First World War also represented a deep cut for the tramway. Initially, the LAG reduced the timetable to save oil at its own power plant. In 1917, it was finally connected to the general network of the Oberschwäbische Elektrizitätswerke (OEW) via a substation, because the railway transported numerous workers for the armaments industry in Friedrichshafen with branches in Ravensburg and Weingarten.

=== Difficult interwar period ===
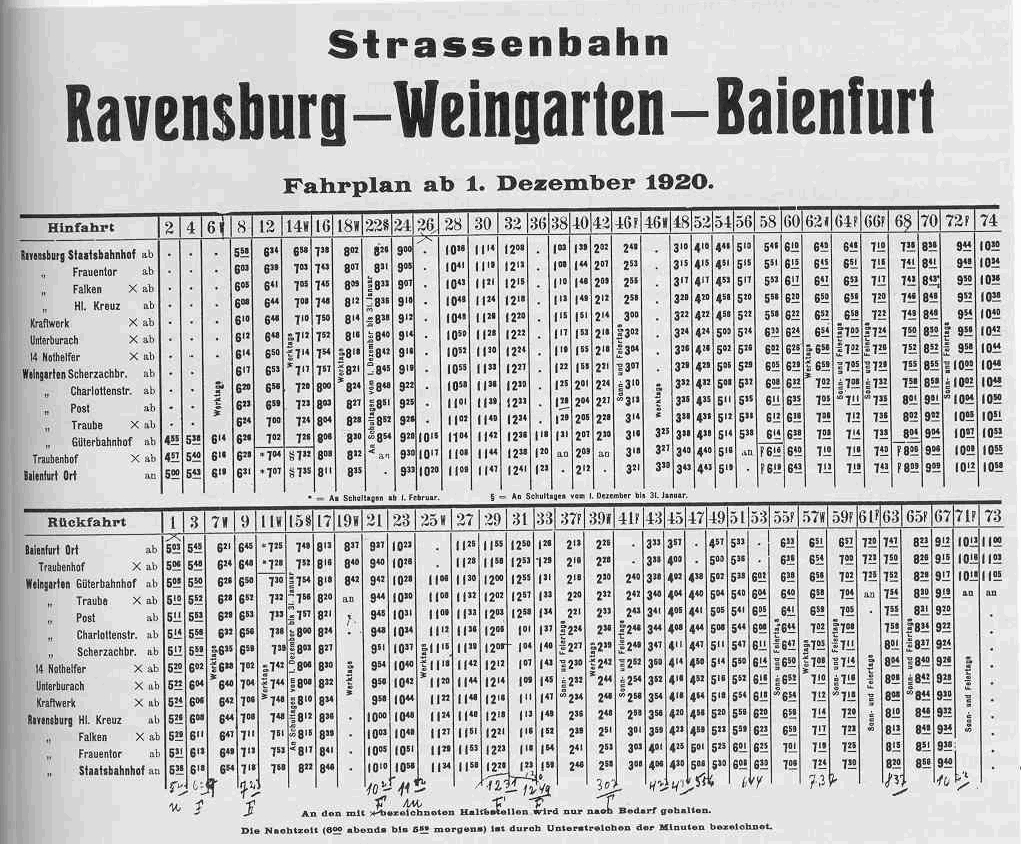
Timetable of 1 December 1920 – already officially referred to as a tramway at that time. Six of the twelve stops were request stops.

==== 1920s: economic problems and temporary closure ====
Like many other railway lines, operations on the Ravensburg–Baienfurt connection ran into recession-related economic difficulties in the first half of the 1920s. There was even a temporary threat of line closure. The financially distressed LAG therefore demanded subsidy payments from the two involved cities. When these were not granted, the LAG actually suspended operations temporarily from 1 November 1923. Nevertheless, the city of Ravensburg stuck to its decision. It favored a bus service over the unpopular railway operation, which largely escaped municipal influence because decisions were always made in distant Munich, and thus hindered the further development of the railway. Although the railway also fulfilled an important intra-urban function in the city of Ravensburg – there were five stops on Ravensburg city territory, excluding Unterburach – for example, the establishment of additional passing loops in Ravensburg was never possible by mutual agreement. Only when the city of Weingarten relented by granting an annual subsidy could the railway continue operating from 15 January 1924. This reopening was initially intended as a one-month trial operation. Due to its success – the renewed deficit was not as high as feared – operations could continue even after the probationary period expired. A problem for the LAG at that time, especially on holidays, were the postal bus and private buses operating parallel to the railway. This competition only ended when the railway company legally enforced its transport monopoly.

==== Temporary stabilization in the 1930s ====
In the 1930s, the then mayor of Ravensburg, Rudolf Walzer, finally attempted to replace what he considered the outdated tramway with a motor bus service that could have extended further into the southern part of the city. However, the Reichspost was not interested after examining the circumstances, and the Ministry of the Interior stuck with the proven railway – as did the neighboring municipalities of Weingarten and Baienfurt.

Despite its economic problems, the LAG continued to invest in railway operations. For example, against the resistance of the city of Ravensburg, in 1931 it succeeded in expanding the central stop Ravensburg Frauentor into the sixth passing loop overall. This was also associated with a realignment; viewed in the direction of Baienfurt, the trains now passed to the left of the Kreuzbrunnen. With loans from the Deutsche Reichsbahn, a capital reduction, and concessions from the states of Württemberg (due to the two Upper Swabian LAG lines) and Bavaria, another reorganization of the LAG was achieved in 1934, although it only postponed the end. In the mid-1930s (before 1936), the LAG finally abolished the distinction between train classes. Previously, the two middle compartments in the four-axle motor cars or the end compartment in the only two-axle motor car were designated as 2nd class ("upholstered class"), while the remaining seats in the motor cars and most of the trailers represented 3rd class ("wooden class"). This differentiation was highly unusual for a tram-like operation with relatively short travel times anyway. This slightly increased capacity. For example, the large motor cars now had 48 seats instead of the previous 44. However, the spatial separation from the former 2nd class compartments was not eliminated. It now served as a division between smoking and non-smoking areas. In 1937, just one year before the liquidation of the company, two new four-axle trailers were even procured.

==== First conflicts with road traffic ====
Between the two world wars, motorization increased significantly. Whereas previously mainly carriages and carts predominated, now the automobile increasingly dominated. Württemberg State Road 49 became Reichsstraße 30 in 1934. It gained further importance as a result. As early as 1936 to 1942, there were initial plans for a bypass road for the towns of Ravensburg, Weingarten, and Baienfurt.

This development increasingly affected tram operations. In the 1930s, it became increasingly clear that the street-level routing chosen in 1888 was only conditionally compatible with the requirements of modern road traffic. It became more and more apparent that the Ravensburg–Weingarten–Baienfurt railway was indeed more of a tramway, and thus a mode of transport that actively participates in road traffic. For example, the running boards of the trains proved problematic. They protruded 20 centimeters beyond the actual clearance profile of the railway and sometimes endangered road traffic. In the last years under LAG management, the steps were therefore beveled toward the vehicle end. In addition, during those years, the motor cars – but not the trailers – of the railway were retrofitted with four turn signals each (colloquially: "blinkers"). This adapted the railway to the regulations of the then newly introduced Road Traffic Licensing Regulations, which came into force on 13 November 1937.

To prevent nighttime accidents with motor vehicles, whose out-of-town drivers, according to court records in the Ravensburg area, least expected an oncoming tram, the front ends of the motor cars also received a second headlight and two roof lights during LAG times.

==== The new Baienfurt Süd stop ====
The Baienfurt Süd stop at kilometer 6.3 was later introduced to better serve the residential area north of Baienfurt's Friedhofstraße. This increased the total number of tram stops from 14 to 15, reducing the average stop spacing from 505 to 469 meters. It was the only stop established between electrification in 1910 and closure in 1959. The date of its opening is not recorded. However, it is not listed in the timetable of 1 December 1920.

Curiously, it was still on the city territory of Weingarten, as the municipal boundary to Baienfurt ran slightly further north of the station. Parallel to this, about one hundred meters to the west – already on the standard-gauge line toward Baienfurt – there had been a Baienfurt Süd halt since 1914. Unlike the jointly served Traubenhof halt, these two stations were operationally completely separate.

=== Under state railway management ===
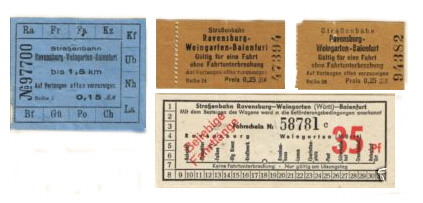
Historical tickets of the tramway – at times a distance-based fare applied, at times a flat fare. The station abbreviations on the blue ticket are: Ra for Ravensburg Bahnhof, Fr for Frauentor, Fa for Falken, Kz for Heilig Kreuz, Kf for Kraftwerk, Ub for Unterburach, Nh for 14 Nothelfer, La for Lamm, Ch for Charlottenplatz, Po for Post, Gü for Güterbahnhof, and Bf for Baienfurt.

==== 1938: from LAG branch line to DR tramway ====
After the economic situation of the LAG continued to fail to improve, the nationalization of the LAG was finally decided in Reichsgesetzblatt No. 23 of 20 June 1938. Effective 1 August 1938, all assets of the LAG passed to the German Reich. The Deutsche Reichsbahn (DR) took over operations on all LAG lines on this date, including the tram-like operation Ravensburg–Weingarten–Baienfurt. The line now belonged to the Reichsbahndirektion Stuttgart. The LAG depot in Weingarten became the Weingarten locomotive depot. As a branch, it was subordinate to the Friedrichshafen railway depot.

The meter-gauge line to Baienfurt was a special case for the Deutsche Reichsbahn. It was henceforth operated as the only German state railway line under the Ordinance on the Construction and Operation of Tramways (BOStrab), which had already come into force on 1 April 1938. The Reichskursbuch also explicitly indicated this from the 1943 annual timetable with the note elektrische Straßenbahn in the header, while in the winter edition 1941/42 the general note Elektrischer Betrieb was still in the same place. From 1944, the note Alle Züge nur 3. Klasse – usual on all other single-class branch lines – was finally omitted, meaning that uniform class was assumed as a matter of course for a tramway.

However, the Deutsche Reichsbahn had previously been responsible for operations of the Neuötting–Altötting steam tramway, closed in 1930, for ten years. It had taken this over upon its founding in 1920 from the Royal Bavarian State Railways. Unlike in Württemberg, under Bavarian law a clear distinction between a tramway and a railway was already possible before 1938. Furthermore, the Deutsche Reichsbahn also owned the similarly licensed Deuben state freight railway as a tramway. Although built by the Royal Saxon State Railways, it was operated by the Dresden Tramway.

The classification as a tramway meant, among other things, that there was still no through ticketing between the tramway to Baienfurt and the railway, even though it was the same company since 1938. Passengers could not purchase through tickets from Reichsbahn stations to destinations on the tramway. Conversely, the conductors on the trams also did not sell tickets to destinations beyond Ravensburg. The same applied to luggage transport. Through checking of luggage was not possible. Independently of this, a general Beschränkte Gepäckbeförderung bei allen Zügen applied. Furthermore, the change from branch line to tramway was also externally noticeable: the motor cars were then equipped with the destination signs required by BOStrab. Section 32 states: „Das erste Fahrzeug eines fahrplanmäßigen Zuges muß vorn ein Zielschild tragen, das auch bei Dunkelheit gut sichtbar ist."

==== New stop designations ====
In addition, after taking over the line in 1938, the Deutsche Reichsbahn introduced new designations for some stops. These changes probably occurred with the first timetable change after the takeover, i.e., at the start of the 1938/39 winter timetable – valid from 2 October 1938:

old	new
Ravensburg Staatsbahnhof	Ravensburg Bahnhof
Kraftwerk	Ravensburg Kraftwerk
Unterburach	Ravensburg Unterburach
14 Nothelfer	Weingarten (Württ) 14 Nothelfer
Weingarten Scherzachbrücke	Weingarten (Württ) Lamm
Weingarten Charlottenstraße	Weingarten (Württ) Charlottenstraße
Weingarten Post	Weingarten (Württ) Post
Weingarten Traube	Weingarten (Württ) Traube
Weingarten Güterbahnhof	Weingarten (Württ) Güterbahnhof

The addition (Württ) for Württemberg was intended to avoid confusion with the stations Weingarten (Baden) or Weingarten (Pfalz) station. The background for renaming Weingarten Scherzachbrücke to Weingarten Lamm is not recorded. Lamm was the name of a hotel at nearby Liebfrauenstraße 53. Independently, the Traubenhof stop continued to be listed entirely without the addition Weingarten or Weingarten (Württ). The Unterburach station received the Ravensburg addition, although it was on Weingarten territory. This is because the eponymous district of Burach belongs to Ravensburg. Moreover, the city boundary in this area runs directly next to the former railway track.

==== National Socialism and further renamed stops ====
During the Nazi era, Weingarten was incorporated into Ravensburg on 1 April 1939. With the exception of the northern terminus Baienfurt Ort, all tram stops were now on Ravensburg city territory. In this context, two stops in Weingarten were renamed. This probably happened with the start of the summer timetable on 15 May 1939:

old	new
Weingarten (Württ) Charlottenstraße	Weingarten (Württ) Horst-Wessel-Straße
Weingarten (Württ) 14 Nothelfer	Weingarten (Württ) Städtisches Krankenhaus

In the first case, the renaming is obvious; there was already a Charlottenstraße in Ravensburg's old town, which is still called that today. In the second case, the Christian addition 14 Nothelfer was to be eliminated for political reasons. The Weingarten hospital itself was not renamed; it still bears its Christian addition and today operates as Krankenhaus 14 Nothelfer GmbH. Paradoxically, however, the Weingarten stops continued to be prefixed with Weingarten (Württ), even though Weingarten did not exist on paper during this time.

==== Second World War and occupation period ====
During the Second World War, the tramway was allowed to operate even during air raids. Unlike municipally operated tramways in other cities, as a so-called public transport railway it was subject to railway air raid protection. This is evident from a letter written by the responsible DR operations office in Friedrichshafen on 22 February 1941.

There was no serious war damage to the tramway, so it could operate continuously during the war. Operations were only suspended on 23 April 1945 because the Wehrmacht set up tank traps at that time. On 28 April 1945, the French Armed Forces marched into Ravensburg. The barriers were leveled again. The city and tramway now belonged to the French occupation zone. Operations initially remained suspended. However, as early as 18 June 1945, the French military governor of the Ravensburg district, Steiner, ordered the resumption of railway operations. After just over two and a half months of interruption, it resumed normal service on 11 July 1945. To ensure regulated railway operations, the new authorities founded the Oberdirektion der Deutschen Eisenbahnen der französisch besetzten Zone with headquarters in Speyer on 8 January 1946. The tramway to Baienfurt was now also subordinate to this. On 25 June 1947, it was absorbed into the Southwest German Railway Company, whose general directorate was also in Speyer.

On 1 April 1946, the two cities of Ravensburg and Weingarten were separated again. Horst-Wessel-Straße became Abt-Hyller-Straße. The stop itself, however, was renamed Weingarten (Württ) Charlottenplatz. The designation of the stop Weingarten (Württ) Städtisches Krankenhaus was not changed again during the tramway's time.

==== The Deutsche Bundesbahn era begins ====
In the post-war period, the Ravensburg–Weingarten–Baienfurt tramway shared the fate of the other railway lines in the French-occupied zone. With the Southwest German Railway Company, they passed into the ownership of the Deutsche Bundesbahn at the latest under the Federal Railway Act of 18 December 1951. Ravensburg–Weingarten–Baienfurt was henceforth not only the only tram operation of the Deutsche Bundesbahn, but also still the only tram operation owned by the German state. Because the parallel Deutsche Reichsbahn owned no tram operation despite numerous nationalizations. The former electric Klingenthal–Sachsenberg-Georgenthal narrow-gauge railway of the Deutsche Reichsbahn was operated under similar circumstances to the line to Baienfurt, yet it was always legally classified as a railway – regardless of the use of only slightly adapted tram vehicles.

==== Economic miracle and traffic problems ====
In the course of the Wirtschaftswunder, not only did passenger numbers rise in the 1950s, but so did motorized individual traffic in Ravensburg and the surrounding area. This so-called mass motorization increasingly caused problems for the tramway. The conflicts already known from the 1930s intensified further. Particularly in the city center of Ravensburg and on the sections along Bundesstraße 30, which emerged from Reichsstraße 30 in 1949, the railway was increasingly perceived as a traffic obstacle. Due to the laterally laid track, trams traveling toward Ravensburg met northbound road traffic head-on in the village through roads of Ravensburg and Baienfurt. The comparatively wide old vehicles of the railway, at 2.5 meters, proved particularly problematic in this regard. In design and size, they corresponded more to a light railway than a classic tram. This led, among other things, to trucks driving on the road protruding into the clearance profile required by the tram in the curves of the line. Adding to the difficulty was the asymmetrical design of the old vehicles. They were wider in the passenger compartment area than in the entry platform area. The space they actually required could therefore only be estimated with great difficulty from the front.

The protruding running boards of the old vehicles also caused problems again at the beginning of the 1950s. The beveling done during LAG times could not solve the problem in the long term. In the first half of the 1950s, the Deutsche Bundesbahn therefore decided, as an emergency measure, to permanently lock the doors on the west side. The interfering running boards on the road side of the vehicle, i.e., toward Bundesstraße 30, could thus be completely removed. This modification was only possible because all platforms on the Ravensburg–Weingarten–Baienfurt tramway were on the same side – namely the east side. Furthermore, this successfully prevented passengers from alighting directly on the roadway side and being endangered by road traffic there. This rather rare operating form of bidirectional operation with one-sided doors can still be observed today, among others, on the Kirnitzsch Valley Tramway, the Drachenfels Railway, the Gmunden Tramway, or the Italian Trieste–Opicina tramway, even if the reasons for this differ in part for the mentioned operations.

==== 1953 to 1955: Hesitant modernization and clock-face scheduling ====
At the beginning of the 1950s, passenger numbers on the Ravensburg–Weingarten–Baienfurt tramway rose sharply. While approximately two million passengers were carried annually in the immediate postwar period, the figure had already reached 3,192,650 by 1951 with a continuing upward trend. The tramway to Baienfurt developed into a mass transit system during this time. Despite massive traffic problems, the Deutsche Bundesbahn initially had no intention of converting the line to bus operation. To meet the growing transport needs, a fixed 20-minute interval was introduced all day from 1953, with 30-minute service in the evening after 21:00. This replaced the previous demand-oriented timetable. However, the entire tram fleet first had to be converted from the classic manually operated trumpet coupler to the more modern automatic BSI compact coupler. This rationalization measure greatly simplified shunting operations, particularly making it easier to turn around at the terminals. This was necessary because the new clock-face scheduling allowed only relatively short turnaround times. In Baienfurt, only three minutes were scheduled for turning, and in Ravensburg only four minutes. To ensure punctual operation, it was essential to avoid delaying the departure of the opposing service, especially in the event of delays.

At the same time, the city of Ravensburg pushed forward with plans to convert the tram to bus operation. To this end, on 12 June 1953, an initial meeting took place between Ravensburg and the Deutsche Bundesbahn—without the involvement of Weingarten and Baienfurt. Due to growing motor vehicle traffic, Federal Highway 30 was to be widened to four lanes—at the expense of the tram right-of-way. In addition, the existing Ravensburg city bus service, with its short routes, was considered unprofitable and was to become more economical by incorporating the longer route to Baienfurt. The Deutsche Bundesbahn joined in and, for cost reasons, also demanded diesel bus service from then on. In contrast, Weingarten and Baienfurt formed an alliance in favor of the tram and commissioned corresponding counter-expert reports.

After passenger numbers continued to rise in the following years, the Deutsche Bundesbahn decided shortly after introducing clock-face scheduling to increase frequency. To this end, in 1954 it acquired two modern large-capacity trams for its unusual branch of operations. The fleet thus grew from six to eight powered cars. They were needed to operate every ten minutes between Ravensburg station and Weingarten Charlottenplatz during peak hours. This further expansion of service was introduced in 1955. Thus, the Deutsche Bundesbahn continued the modernization of the tram begun in 1953—albeit very hesitantly. With the ten-minute interval, the tram reached the limit of its capacity; the line remained single-track throughout even after 1955. However, the frequency increase was also associated with a sharp fare hike; fares rose by 40 percent on 1 October 1955.

==== 1956 to 1957: Class reform and three-light peak signal ====
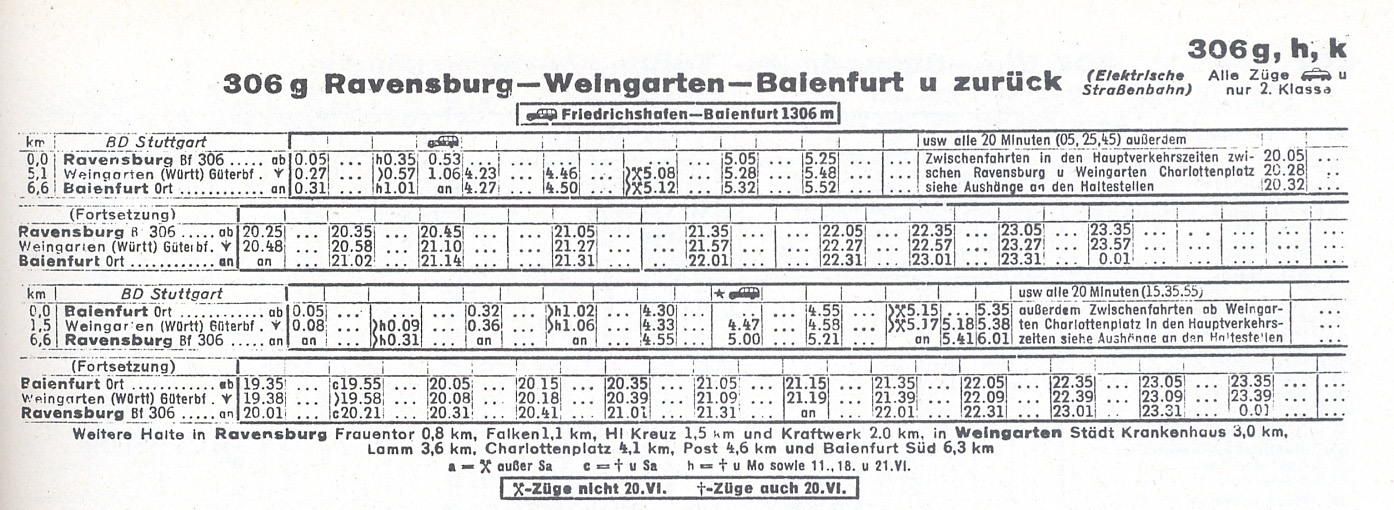
Summer timetable 1957: the intermediate trips introduced in 1955 are not explicitly listed

With the so-called class reform—meaning the abolition of the former 1st class—tram cars operating between Ravensburg and Baienfurt were "upgraded" starting with the summer timetable on 3 June 1956. The timetable accordingly stated consistently: All trains 2nd class only. In practice, however, the Deutsche Bundesbahn—like the Deutsche Reichsbahn before it—refrained from marking its tram vehicles accordingly. Unlike other vehicles of the two state railways, they were not labeled with the corresponding class numbers. The 1956 change thus existed only on paper.

Independently of the traffic problems described above, in 1957 the tram's powered cars also received an additional front headlight mounted in the roof area. This ensured the so-called three-light peak signal. Its introduction was required by law to better distinguish rail vehicles at night from the ever-growing number of road vehicles. The introduction was nationwide under the Road Traffic Licensing Regulations and had nothing to do with the specific safety problems on the line in question.

==== 1957 to 1958: Fatal traffic accident and controversial closure plans ====
In the second half of the 1950s, mutual obstructions between the tram and the steadily increasing motor vehicle traffic became intolerable to those responsible. Not least due to a series of traffic accidents between 1956 and 1958, they repeatedly pushed for cessation of operations. In contrast, the local population favored retaining tram service, partly because higher fares were feared in the event of conversion to bus operation. As an example, opponents cited the existing bus connection from Ravensburg to Eschach, where a ticket then cost two and a half times as much as a tram ticket for the roughly equal-length route to Baienfurt. The Deutsche Bundesbahn acknowledged the threatened fare increase but pointed out "that this increase would be unavoidable even if rail operations were retained".

On 3 July 1957, another serious traffic accident occurred, this time claiming the first fatality. A long-timber truck en route to Weingarten collided with a tram at the Ravensburg Kraftwerk stop—three passengers were injured, and a 58-year-old woman died. Although the 20-year-old truck driver was initially acquitted on 11 June 1958, the Ravensburg Regional Court overturned the verdict on 24 September 1958 and convicted the driver—but also assigned partial blame to the railway. Police investigations had previously revealed that the load protruded up to 40 centimeters beyond the truck's side limits. Moreover, the driver was operating this long and heavy vehicle for the first time, and the tachograph recorded speeds between 45 and 50 km/h on the only 5.5-meter-wide, busy, and uneven road.

The judgment review led to a directive on 9 October 1958 restricting the tram's maximum speed from 13 October 1958 from the previous 25 km/h to as low as ten km/h in some sections. This applied to the sections Ravensburg station–Ravensburg Frauentor and Ravensburg Heilig Kreuz–Weingarten Lamm. Furthermore, the protruding passenger compartments of the older vehicles were provisionally marked in autumn 1958 with conspicuous red-and-white striped warning markings. Government authorities rejected the Bundesbahn's proposal to paint a continuous white line along the tracks at a safety distance of 40 centimeters on Federal Highway 30.

As a result of the 10 km/h speed limit, journey times lengthened on one hand, and on the other, due to limited crossing possibilities, the intermediate trips introduced in 1955 for the ten-minute interval during peak hours could no longer be offered. This further reduced the attractiveness of the already comparatively slow tram compared to competing private motor traffic—or the planned bus operation. For example, schoolchildren and workers could no longer travel home during lunch breaks. Massive protests followed from citizens and businesses; the Chamber of Industry and Commerce considered a strike. As a substitute for the canceled extra trips between Weingarten and Ravensburg, the Deutsche Bundesbahn provisionally deployed buses during peak hours, alternating with trams now running at most every 20 minutes.

Since competitive operation was no longer possible under these conditions, the Deutsche Bundesbahn presented the Baden-Württemberg state government with a choice: Either the state should cover the difference of 1.97 million marks between the costs of bus operation and the higher costs of safely operating the tram line—or agree to complete conversion to buses. The state railway aimed, among other things, to protect its employees from legal risks.

The state government in Stuttgart consequently decided to convert to bus operation. In addition, after the tram's closure, Federal Highway 30 between Ravensburg and Weingarten was to be expanded to four lanes for a total of 2.8 million Deutsche Marks. Initially, however, only a short-term widening by 35 centimeters was planned, necessary for smooth future bus traffic. This measure was assigned to the cities of Ravensburg and Weingarten. This decision also went against the bypass road for Ravensburg, which had already been concretely planned by the late 1950s. In Upper Swabia at that time, the then-modern concept of the so-called car-friendly city was pursued, named after the book of the same name published locally in Ravensburg by Otto Maier Verlag in 1959, the year the tram closed.

==== 1959: Stepwise conversion to rail replacement service ====
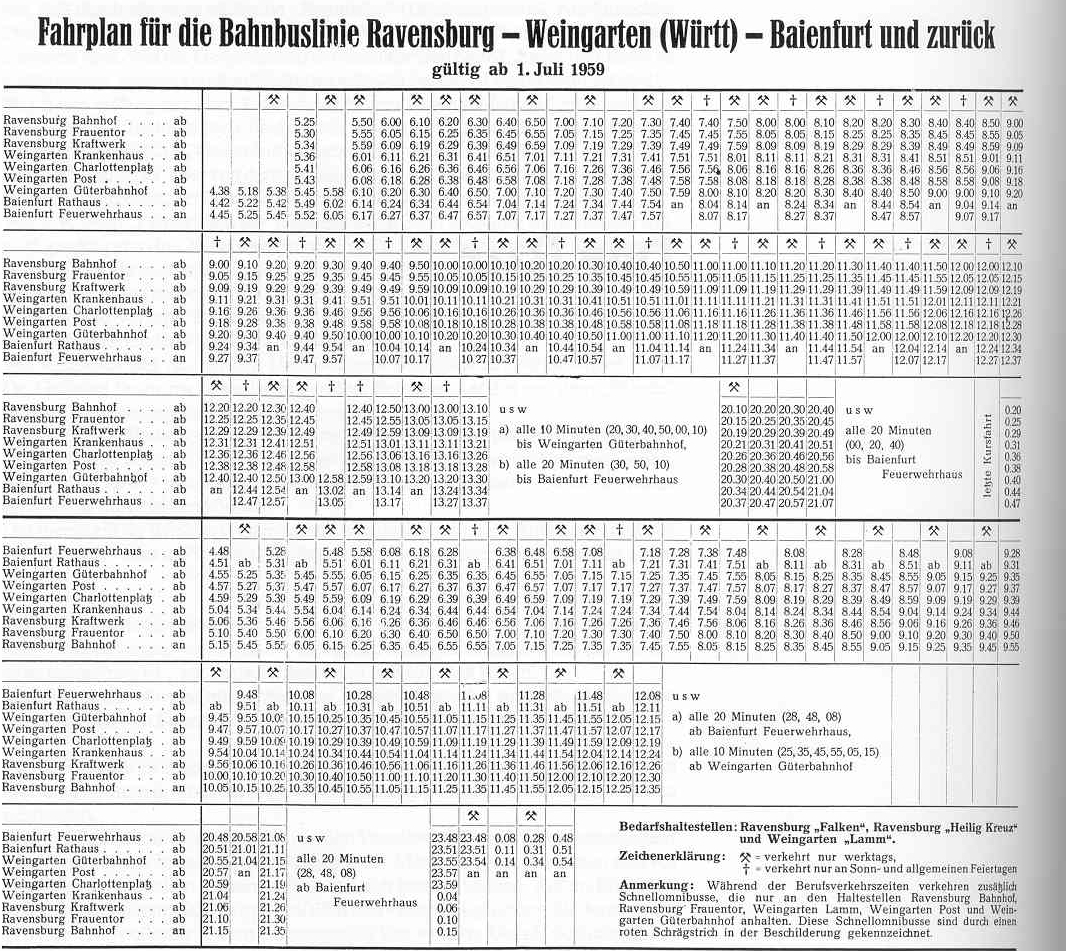
Bus timetable from 1 July 1959: Although still rail replacement service, the route is already officially designated as a Bahnbus line

As early as 27 October 1958, the Stuttgart Bundesbahn Directorate ordered: "Large-capacity buses will take over traffic between Ravensburg and Weingarten for the time being. On the Weingarten–Baienfurt section, the previous 20-minute service will be resumed." Due to an administrative complaint by the city of Weingarten and the municipality of Baienfurt, which—unlike the city of Ravensburg—continued to advocate retaining the tram, the state railway initially could not implement its plan immediately. Ultimately, the protest from Weingarten and Baienfurt was ineffective. In January 1959, Kurt Hagner, president of the Stuttgart Bundesbahn Directorate, announced the conversion to bus operation, and on 12 February 1959, the Tübingen Regional Council announced that tram services would operate only between Weingarten Charlottenplatz and Baienfurt Ort starting 23 February 1959. The Deutsche Bundesbahn published the timetable for these services only two days earlier, on 21 February 1959. However, the substitute bus service then introduced between Ravensburg and Weingarten initially had only provisional legal status. Due to the unresolved administrative complaint, it was declared so-called emergency service. De jure, it was thus initially a rail replacement bus service. For passengers from Baienfurt, this temporarily involved changing in Weingarten.

When sufficient buses were available after another four months, the remaining 2.5-kilometer operation on the northern section Weingarten–Baienfurt could finally be converted to bus service. Trams ran for the last time on Tuesday, 30 June 1959. The buses to Baienfurt also initially operated de jure as rail replacement service, but the Deutsche Bundesbahn officially designated the route as a Bahnbus line starting 1 July 1959. However, no specific line designation existed at the time; the typical four-digit line numbers in Bahnbus service were introduced by the Deutsche Bundesbahn only a few years later. The bus service introduced in 1959 initially had a provisional character. For example, stops Ravensburg Unterburach, Ravensburg Kraftwerk, Traubenhof, and Baienfurt Süd could not initially be served due to lack of suitable stopping places. In addition, with the introduction of rail replacement service in 1959, two stops were renamed:

Former	New
Weingarten (Württ) Municipal Hospital	Weingarten (Württ) Hospital
Baienfurt Ort	Baienfurt Town Hall

On the other hand, the conversion also led to clear improvements in the transport situation. For example, buses in Baienfurt ran beyond the previous terminus to Baienfurt Fire Station, thus also serving the Baienfurt town center. The timetable was also further extended, though this improvement was primarily a result of the lower capacity of buses compared to tram trains:

- Intermediate trips between Weingarten and Ravensburg were offered not only during peak hours but all day until about 21:00. Compared to the intermediate trips abandoned in October 1958 on the tram, they ran not only to Weingarten Charlottenplatz but to Weingarten freight yard. In the morning peak (6:00 to 8:00), intermediate trips even ran to Baienfurt. For the first time, a ten-minute interval was offered over the entire route.
- The 20-minute basic interval of the tram was extended into the evening after 21:00 and applied until the end of service.
- Furthermore, during peak hours between Ravensburg station and Weingarten freight yard, in addition to intermediate trips, so-called express buses ran. They stopped en route only at Ravensburg Frauentor, Weingarten Lamm, and Weingarten Post. These services were marked with a red diagonal line on the destination sign, i.e., a so-called striped line signal.

==== Overaged rolling stock ====
In addition to traffic problems, the heavily overaged rolling stock played a significant role in the decision to convert to bus operation. In the closure year 1959, the tram's eight powered cars had been in service for an average of 37.5 years, including the two new cars from 1954. At that time, the five cars acquired for electrification were each already 49 years in service and worn out by two world wars. The situation was even more critical for the eleven trailers. In 1959, they averaged 56.1 years old. Six dated from the steam tram era and thus from the line's founding year. These veterans were already 71 years old. Compounding this was the clock-face schedule introduced in 1953—which significantly increased daily mileage—and the heavy strain from continuously rising passenger numbers. The six powered cars with trailers carried only about one million passengers annually in the early years of electric operation, but by 1954 the total was nearly five million.

==== Zeitgeist and general trend ====
Just under 21 years after takeover by the Reichsbahn, the tram—second only to the former steam tram Neuötting–Altötting as a state-owned tram in Germany—was history again. Independently of the specific situation on the Ravensburg–Baienfurt route, the closure followed a general trend in West Germany in two respects. On one hand, many municipal transport companies were also converting their trams to bus or trolleybus operation. In 1959 alone, six more systems closed (Rheydt, Herne–Castrop-Rauxel, Minden, Solingen, Völklingen, and Lübeck). The weekly newspaper Die Zeit described this zeitgeist in its issue of 6 March 1959 as follows: So the tram is finally on the extinction list—here as elsewhere. But it is hard to make clear to the people in the heat of the battle of Weingarten and Ravensburg that a new era is dawning...

On the other hand, the Deutsche Bundesbahn soon afterward ceased passenger service on its other narrow-gauge lines, considered uneconomical due to elaborate operations: 1960 on the Walhallabahn, 1964 on the two Upper Swabian neighbor lines, the Öchsle railway and Federsee Railway, 1966 on the Bottwartal Railway, 1967 on the Altensteigerle, and 1973 on the Odenwald Express. The Zabergäu Railway was regauged in 1964/65 but ultimately converted to bus in 1986. Only the Wangerooge Island Railway remains today as the sole DB narrow-gauge line.

=== Bus service from 1962 to the present ===
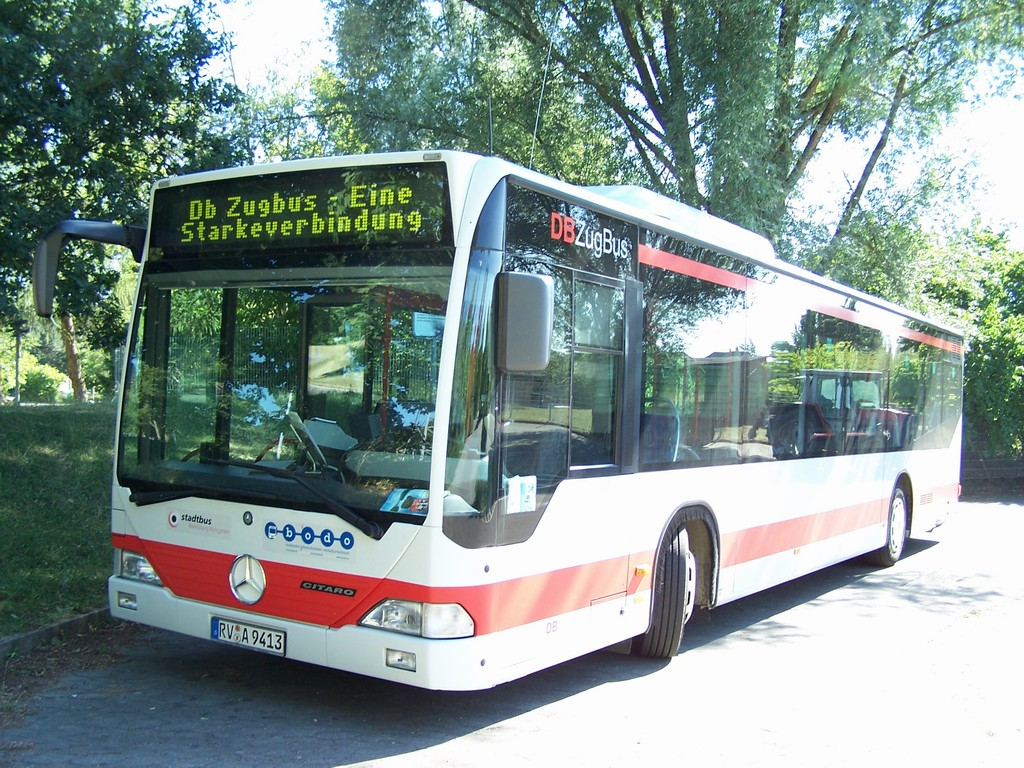
A RAB bus in the design of stadtbus Ravensburg-Weingarten GmbH

==== Dismantling and final establishment of bus operations ====
Dismantling of the overhead line and tarring over of the rails began in 1961; between Ravensburg station and Frauentor, the rails were completely removed in August of that year. Independently, passenger service on the line was not officially discontinued until 31 December 1961, meaning the rail replacement service ended. Subsequently, the Deutsche Bundesbahn received a regular Bahnbus concession for the route. Two years later, the tram line was formally closed and thus dededicated on 1 January 1964. Unaffected was the three-rail section, which continued to be used by standard-gauge freight trains to Weingarten until 26 October 1999 and was officially closed on 1 December of that year.

==== From Bahnbus line to city bus network ====
Over the decades, the Bahnbus line introduced as a substitute in 1959 developed into a regular city bus network. Direct successors of the tram are today's bus lines 1 and 2. Their routing matches exactly that of the former tram line. However, both are now diameter lines and additionally serve the Ravensburg districts of Schmalegg and Weststadt in the southwest. In the north, they extend beyond Baienfurt to Baindt. New lines were also introduced to serve residential areas away from the former tram line, such as today's line 3 to Hegaustraße (at Sonnenbüchel) or line 5 to Schacherösch (to Baienfurt).

The former Bahnbus division of the Deutsche Bundesbahn—which had taken over tram operations—was dissolved in 1989, giving rise to the still-existing DB ZugBus Regionalverkehr Alb-Bodensee (RAB). It was initially a 100% subsidiary of the Deutsche Bundesbahn; since its privatization in 1994, it has been a subsidiary of Deutsche Bahn AG.

The RAB cooperates closely with the cities of Ravensburg and Weingarten and private bus operators in the transport area. This initially occurred within the rundumbus Ravensburg Weingarten transport association launched in 1996, from which the current stadtbus Ravensburg Weingarten GmbH emerged in 2004. The RAB, together with Ravensburg public utilities, Weingarten public utilities, and two private bus companies, is a co-shareholder in the GmbH, holding the largest share at 45.2 percent. Beyond its own lines, it also manages operations for lines concessioned to Ravensburg or Weingarten public utilities, which own no buses themselves. Operation of city bus services by the Deutsche Bahn group is comparatively rare and in this case traces back to the concessioning of the former tram. Typically, companies of DB Stadtverkehr GmbH operate only regional buses.

==== Current transport situation ====
The former tram route remains the main axis in the public transport of Ravensburg and Weingarten to this day. Most bus stops still correspond in location to the 15 former tram stops. Eight stops moreover retain their old names over sixty years later, though the suffix (Württ) for Weingarten stops was dropped:

Former tram stops	Current bus stops	Remarks
Ravensburg station	Ravensburg station	
Ravensburg Frauentor	Ravensburg Schussenstraße	
–	Ravensburg Gartenstraße	newly established
Ravensburg Falken	Ravensburg Gymnasien	
Ravensburg Heilig Kreuz	Ravensburg St. Elisabethen Hospital	
Ravensburg Kraftwerk	Ravensburg Police Headquarters	renamed in December 2020
Ravensburg Unterburach	Ravensburg Vocational School Center	
Weingarten (Württ) Municipal Hospital	Weingarten 14 Nothelfer Hospital	
Weingarten (Württ) Lamm	Weingarten Linse (Note: The current bus stop Weingarten Linse is north of the Scherzach; the former tram stop was south of the bridge.)	renamed in December 2007
Weingarten (Württ) Charlottenplatz	Weingarten Charlottenplatz	
–	Weingarten Evangelical City Church	newly established
Weingarten (Württ) Post	Weingarten Post	
Weingarten (Württ) Traube	–	abandoned
Weingarten (Württ) Freight Yard	Weingarten Freight Yard	
–	Weingarten Haasstraße	newly established
Traubenhof	Weingarten Trauben (Note: The current bus stop Weingarten Trauben is about 150 meters north of the former tram stop, thus closer to the namesake settlement.)	renamed in December 2007
Baienfurt Süd	–	abandoned
Baienfurt Ort	Baienfurt Achtal School	

== Transport performance over the years ==
=== Service offer ===
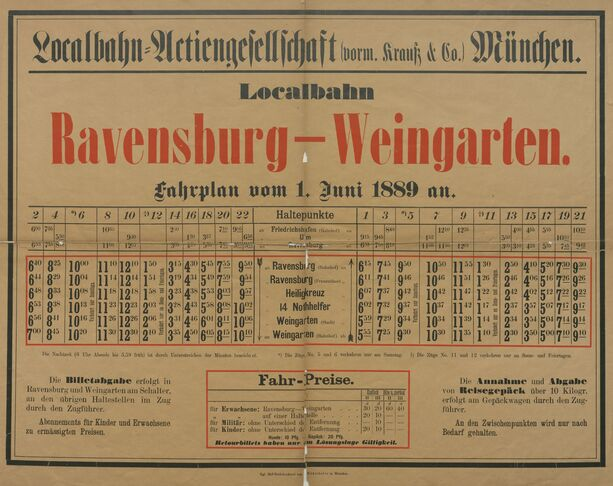
Timetable of 1 June 1889; eleven train pairs ran daily then. Stop 14 Nothelfer was still spelled with two "h"s per the orthography valid until the 1901 Orthographic Conference, and Heilig Kreuz was written as one word.

Compared to the later electric tram, the steam tram with its two train sets operated relatively infrequently in the early years. As late as 1897, only eleven trips were offered on weekdays, exactly as many as in the opening year 1888. Only later did this change: with 37 (1906) or even 38 (1909) daily train trips in each direction, the steam tram reached the limit of its capacity. After electrification and extension, the timetable was further densified. In 1914, with the six available powered cars, service ran approximately every 30 minutes, and on Sunday afternoons even every 20 minutes. In economically difficult times (1927 and 1946), one train per hour had to suffice. But by 1934 or 1948, it was double that again. Until 1953, service was largely demand-oriented, primarily timed to connect with trains on the Southern Railway. Only in 1953 was a fixed clock-face schedule introduced all day. The following data are recorded over the years:

Year	1888	1906	1909	1919	1920	1944	1946–1950	1957 (Note: without intermediate trips Ravensburg station <> Weingarten Charlottenplatz)
Train pairs on weekdays except Saturday	11	37	38	67	33	37 / 35	43	58 / 59
Train pairs on Saturday	11	37	38	67	33	37 / 35	43	59 / 62
Train pairs on Sundays and holidays	9	37	34	70	31 / 32	32 / 31	48	58 / 61

Individual trips were distinguished by train numbers, which—untypically for a tram—were still used after 1938, for example in 1944. In the 1957 timetable, however, they are no longer listed. Services toward Baienfurt had even numbers; those toward Ravensburg had odd numbers. At times, demand was so high that individual services had to be reinforced with so-called follow-on trains; these additional trains are not included in the table. The follow-on and main train then followed at sight distance, with follow-ons signed accordingly to ensure oncoming trains at passing loops waited for the main train.

=== Operating hours ===
Operating hours also matched those common in large-city tram systems; even in the war year 1944, service ran until shortly before midnight:

- 1920: 4:55 a.m. to 11:05 p.m.
- 1944: 4:52 a.m. to 11:55 p.m.
- 1957: 4:23 a.m. to 1:06 a.m.

=== Journey times and speed ===
According to the 1920 timetable, most trains took 33 minutes for the full Ravensburg–Baienfurt route, corresponding to an average speed of only 11.9 km/h. In later years, the timetable was somewhat tightened; in 1944 and 1957, most trains covered the full route in 26 or 27 minutes, i.e., at average speeds of 15.1 or 14.6 km/h.

=== Circulations ===
With the introduction of fixed clock-face scheduling, the following vehicle requirement resulted in the last six years of operation:

10-minute interval (peak hours)	5 circulations	3 main circulations over the full route 2 extra circulations between Ravensburg station and Weingarten Charlottenplatz
20-minute interval (daytime)	3 circulations	
30-minute interval (after 21:00)	2 circulations	

=== Passenger numbers ===
								1888	1889
								179,474	179,553
1890	1891	1892	1893	1894	1895	1896	1897	1898	1899
204,496	213,164	204,874	220,522	234,907	243,660	243,508	253,144	263,034	265,484
1900	1901	1902	1903	1904	1905	1906	1907	1908	1909
289,831	289,939	309,219	319,869	352,399	364,502	374,743	471,018	518,737	556,823
1910	1911	1912	1913	1914	1915	1916	1917	1918	1919
682,166	918,060	unknown	1,089,908	839,865	unknown	unknown	unknown	1,507,000	1,786,084
1920	1921	1922	1923	1924	1925	1926	1927	1928	1929
1,859,260	1,444,678	1,487,251	781,650	763,361	1,069,338	991,761	1,063,477	1,078,284	1,134,416
1930	1931	1932	1933	1934	1935	1936	1937	1938	1939
1,063,046	836,484	750,883	771,002	803,259	935,023	1,019,208	1,178,929	unknown	unknown
1940	1941	1942	1943	1944	1945	1946	1947	1948	1949
unknown	unknown	unknown	unknown	unknown	unknown	ca. 2 million	ca. 2 million	ca. 2 million	ca. 2 million
1950	1951	1952	1953	1954	1955	1956	1957	1958	1959
ca. 2 million	3,192,650	unknown	unknown	4,920,000	4,392,000	5,035,263	4,733,370	unknown	unknown

== Rolling stock ==
=== Acquisitions over the years ===
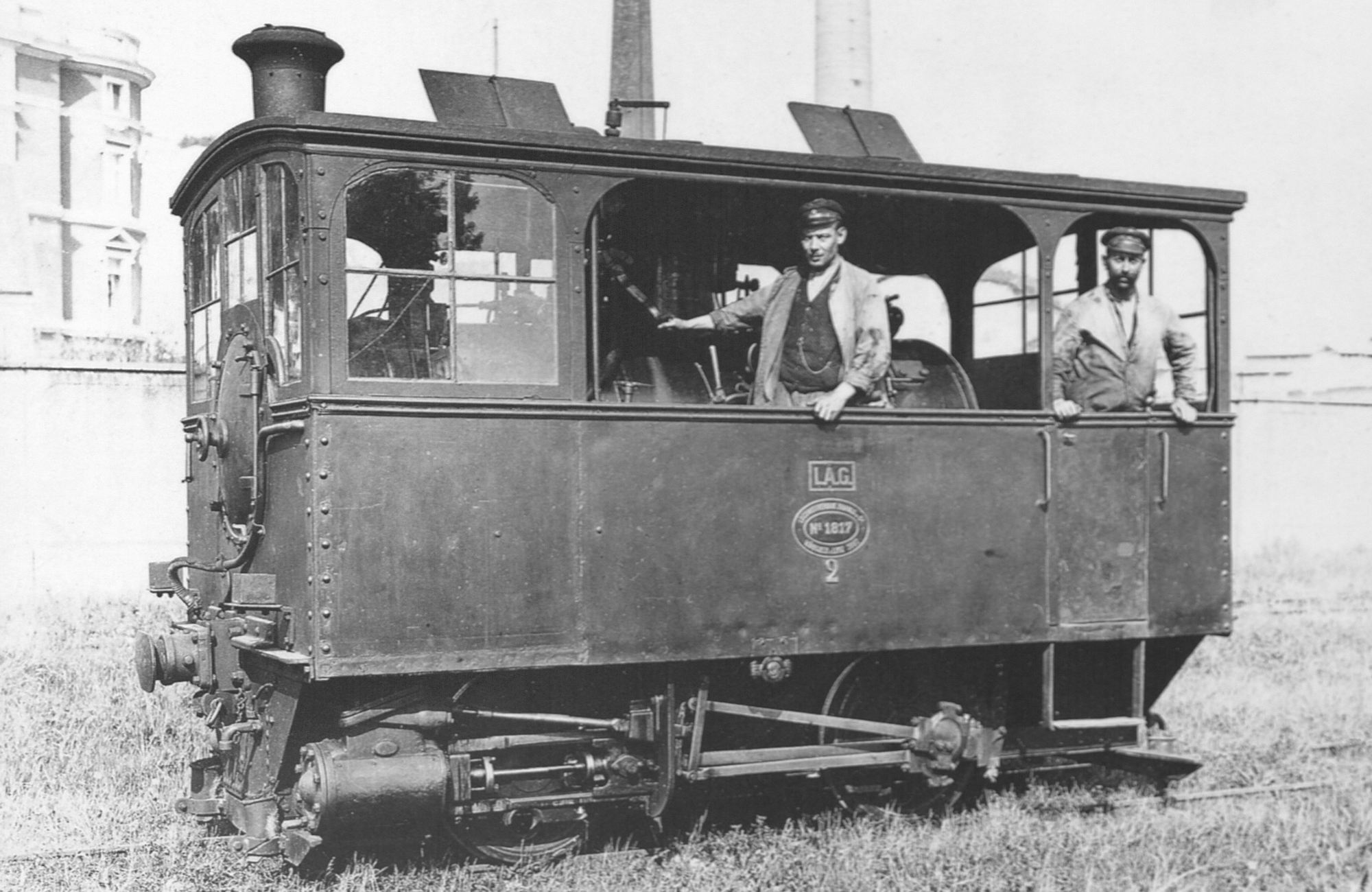
LAG 2 in 1930 at its second location in Regensburg

For the steam tram, two box locomotives without casing were acquired for opening, the LAG 1 and LAG 2 with factory numbers 1814 and 1817. They came from Krauss & Co., a shareholder in LAG, and were the first locomotives of LAG overall. One identical example had been delivered by Krauss shortly before to the Chiemsee Railway.

Seven two-axle trailers (1, 2, 3, 4, 5, 8, and 16) and three freight cars (6, 7, and 17) were available for the steam tram. The passenger cars were supplied by MAN; they weighed 5,000 or 6,050 kilograms, were 8.35 meters long and 2.50 meters wide, with a wheelbase of 3.90 meters.

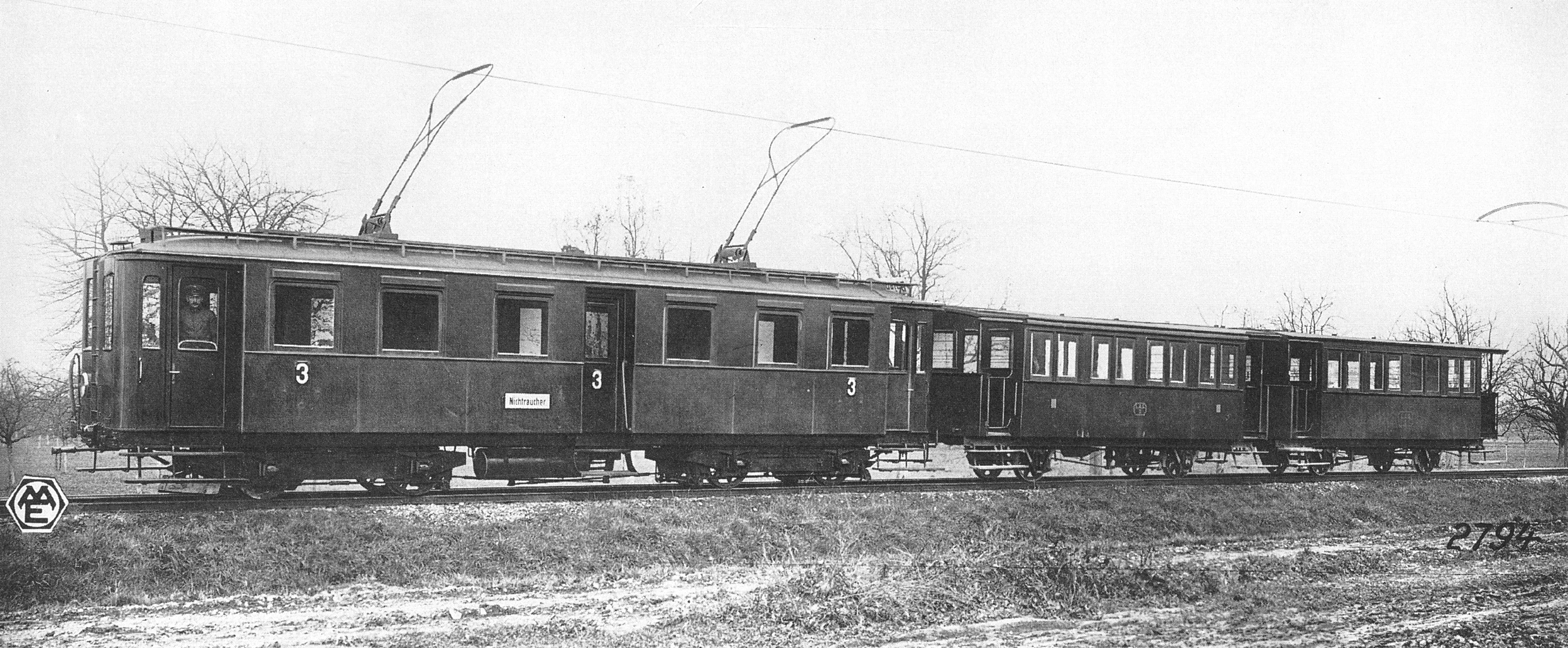
A powered car of series 800–804 with two trailers on a factory photo from Maschinenfabrik Esslingen

For the start of electric operations, the fleet was extensively expanded. LAG acquired five large four-axle powered cars from Maschinenfabrik Esslingen, with electrical equipment from Siemens-Schuckertwerke (SSW). They were designated elT (for electric powered car) by LAG and numbered 800 to 804. They were supplemented by three two-axle trailers (832, 833, and 834), including one half-baggage car. In addition, the former steam tram trailers continued in use behind the new powered cars.

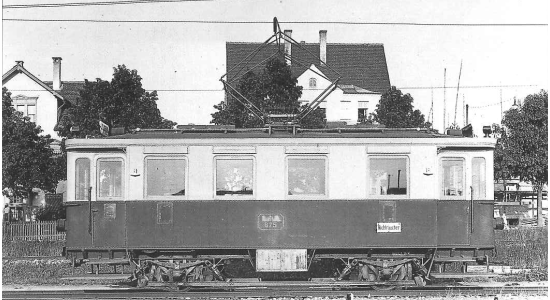
The small powered car number 875

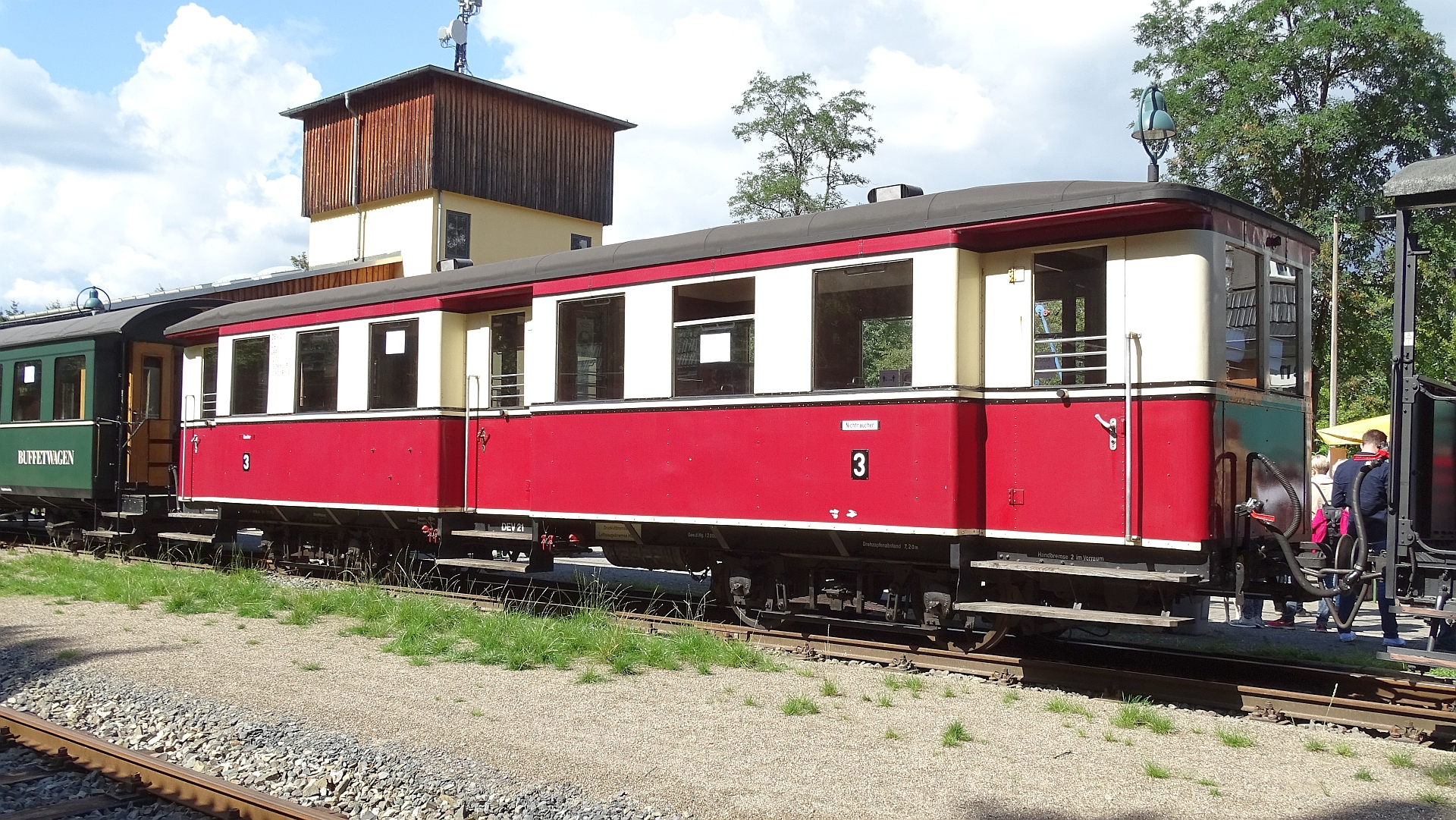
Former trailer 922 as a museum vehicle of the DEV, here in Hüinghausen at the Märkische Museums-Eisenbahn, 2020

In 1914, a smaller two-axle powered car number 875 was added, later known by the nickname Piccolo. Its electrical equipment—deviating from the existing four-axle cars—came from Maschinenfabrik Oerlikon in Switzerland. In 1937, LAG finally acquired two more large four-axle trailers (921 and 922), capacity-matched to the large powered cars. In 1941, the Deutsche Reichsbahn introduced new designations for powered cars and associated trailers. The four-axle cars were assigned series 196.0 (ET 196.0 or EB 196.0), the two-axle under series 197.0 (ET 197.0 or EB 197.0).

In view of the frequency increase to and from Weingarten Charlottenplatz introduced in 1955, the Deutsche Bundesbahn acquired two four-axle large-capacity cars from Duewag. Their electrical equipment came from Kiepe Electric, entering service on 9 April 1954. They were essentially standard vehicles as acquired by many German tram systems at the time. They were classic bidirectional vehicles but, as a special feature analogous to the older cars rebuilt a few years earlier, had doors on only one side from the start. Also characteristic of the two Duewag tram cars of the Deutsche Bundesbahn was the unusually centrally located pantograph and the lack of line number boxes. Furthermore, smoking compartments could not be designated in the new cars due to design—unlike in older cars. The two powered cars were integrated into the fleet as series ET 195 (ET 195 01 and ET 195 02; factory numbers 26887 and 26888) and sometimes operated in multiple traction. For technical reasons—the electrical equipment was incompatible—they could not be coupled with older vehicles. The two new powered cars became the line's mainstay, yet the old powered cars remained indispensable, especially during the 1955 ten-minute interval and high demand, when older vehicles were preferably sent ahead of new ones as "follow-ons".

=== Livery schemes ===
Originally, LAG vehicles were uniformly dark green. Around 1936, a two-tone livery was introduced: below the windows light green, the window band light cream, separated by a dark green line. Shortly thereafter, the Deutsche Reichsbahn repainted them to its standard tram livery: light red below the windows, window band still light cream.

The Deutsche Bundesbahn introduced another scheme, painting vehicles dark red—again analogous to its other powered cars. This was supplemented by three circumferential white trim stripes in the roof area, at window sill height, and above the lower carbody edge. As a special feature, however, the two 1954 large-capacity cars—deviating from the rest of the tram fleet in particular and Deutsche Bundesbahn powered cars in general—were painted light green, supplemented by a circumferential trim strip connected to a dark trim stripe, both just below the window band.

=== Vehicle table ===
No. LAG	No. DR / DB	Build year	Manufacturer	Electrics	Seats	Axle arrangement/ Type	Withdrawal	Remarks
LAG 1	–	1887	Krauss & Co.	–	none	B n2t	1928	1910 to Walhallabahn
LAG 2	–	1887	Krauss & Co.	–	none	B n2t	?	1910 to Walhallabahn
1	–	1887/88	MAN	–	24	2×	before 1937	2nd class trailer
2	EB 197 01	1887/88	MAN	–	32	2×	1959	3rd class trailer
3	EB 197 02	1887/88	MAN	–	32	2×	1959	3rd class trailer
4	EB 197 11	1887/88	MAN	–	13+9	2×	1959	2nd and 3rd class trailer with baggage compartment, later pure post and baggage car, finally tower car
5	EB 197 12	1887/88	MAN	–	32	2×	1959	3rd class trailer with baggage compartment
6	–	1887/88	MAN	–	none	2×	?	open wagon
7	–	1887/88	MAN	–	none	2×	?	open wagon
8	EB 197 03	1887/88	MAN	–	32	2×	1959	3rd class trailer
16	EB 197 04	1887/88	MAN	–	32	2×	1959	3rd class trailer
17	–	1887/88	MAN	–	none	2×	?	boxcar
elT 800	ET 196 01	1908	MF Esslingen	SSW	32+12 / 48	(A1)(1A)	1959	
elT 801	ET 196 02	1908/10	MF Esslingen	SSW	32+12 / 48	(A1)(1A)	1959	
elT 802	ET 196 03	1908/10	MF Esslingen	SSW	32+12 / 48	(A1)(1A)	1959	
elT 803	ET 196 04	1908/10	MF Esslingen	SSW	32+12 / 48	(A1)(1A)	1959	
elT 804	ET 196 05	1910	MF Esslingen	SSW	32+12 / 48	(A1)(1A)	1959	
832	EB 197 05	1910	MF Esslingen	–	24	2×	1959	Trailer with baggage compartment
833	EB 197 06	1910	MF Esslingen	–	32	2×	1959	Trailer
834	EB 197 07	1910	MF Esslingen	–	32	2×	1959	Trailer, finally baggage car
elT 875	ET 197 01	1914	MF Esslingen	Oerlikon	24+6 / 32	Bo	1959	Nickname: Piccolo
921	EB 196 01	1937	MF Esslingen	–	48	4×	1959	Trailer, sold 1962
922	EB 196 02	1937	MF Esslingen	–	48	4×	1959	Trailer, sold 1962, preserved
–	ET 195 01	1954	Duewag	Kiepe	34	B'2' g1t	1959	Sold 1961, preserved
–	ET 195 02	1954	Duewag	Kiepe	34	B'2' g1t	1959	Sold 1961, preserved

=== Fate of the vehicles ===
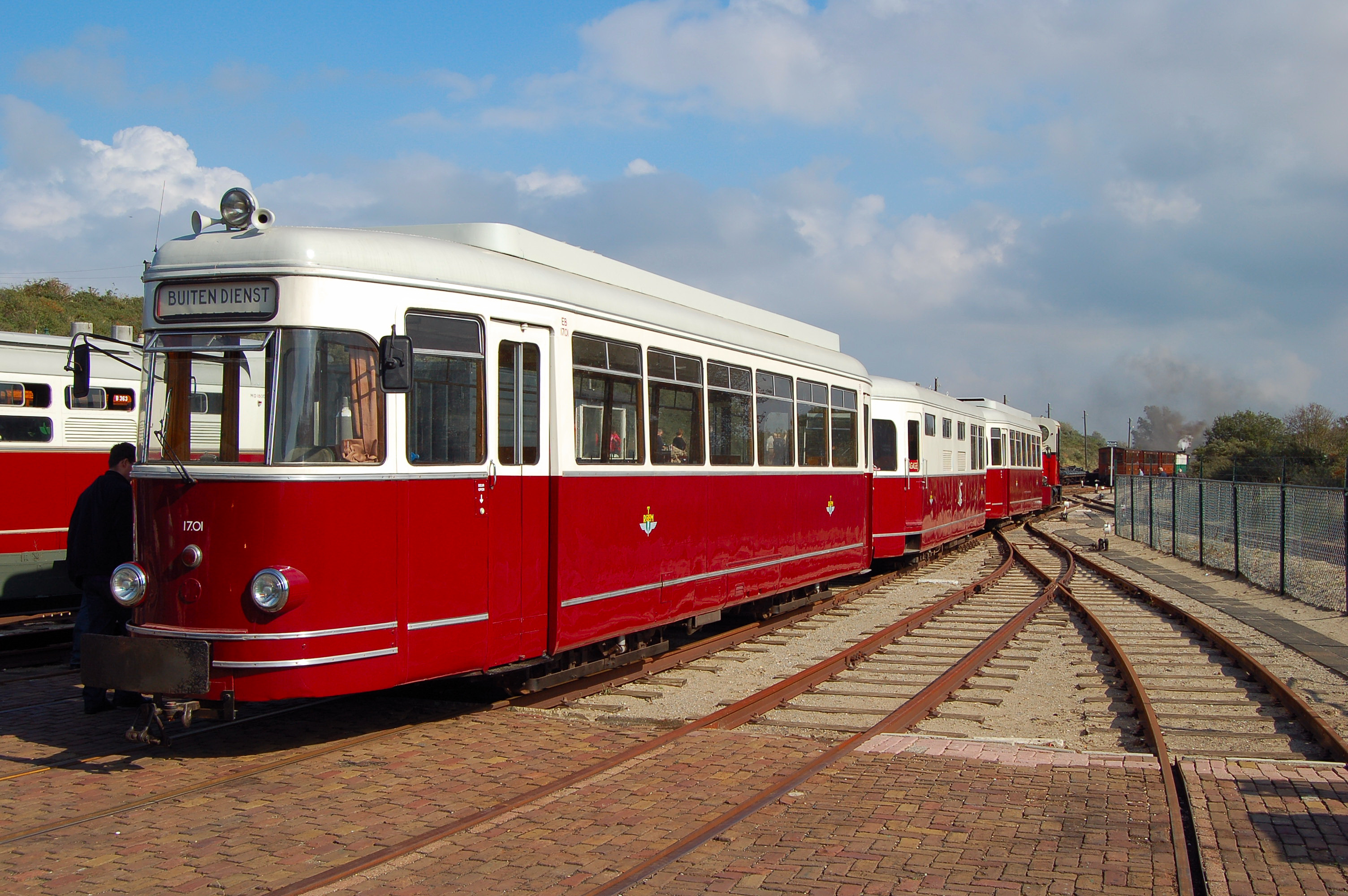
2007: The two new powered cars at RTM Ouddorp—the generator car added in the 1960s is in the middle

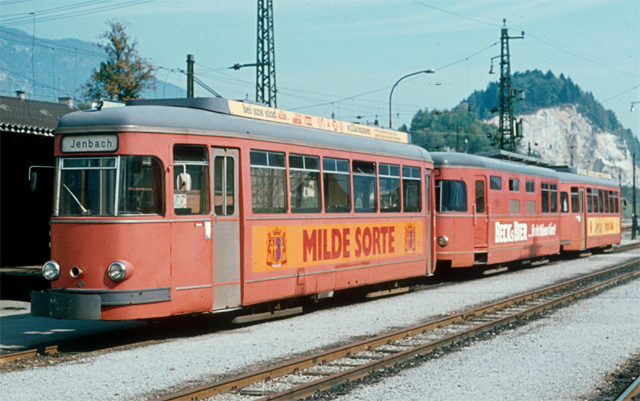
1980 at Zillertal Railway in Jenbach (still with tobacco advertising)

With the start of electric operations, the two 1887 steam locomotives were transferred to the LAG-owned Walhallabahn, where similar machines were already in use. They operated there until the second half of the 1920s. LAG 2 was sold in 1927 to Zellstoffwerke Regensburg; its further fate is unknown. LAG 1 was withdrawn in 1928.

All vehicles still present at closure in 1959 were initially stored on the Weingarten depot grounds. Most were scrapped on site around 1962 after formal closure. Only the four newest—the two 1937 trailers and the two 1954 powered cars—could be sold. Three survive today as reminders of the tram, all operational.

The powered cars ET 195 01 and ET 195 02—just five years old at closure—were sold by the Deutsche Bundesbahn in 1961 to the Dutch railway company Rotterdamsche Tramweg Maatschappij (RTM). There they were regauged and, for operation on the non-electrified RTM network, supplemented with a generator car. This diesel-electric multiple unit, designated M 17, went to the Austrian Zillertal Railway in 1967. Since 1999, the unit has been back in the Netherlands and has been regularly used since October 2003 on the RTM Museum Railway Ouddorp–West-Repart.

The trailers EB 196 01 (formerly 921) and EB 196 02 (formerly 922) went in 1962 to the Austrian Stern & Hafferl, where only EB 196 02 entered service, receiving new number B 20.221. EB 196 01 was scrapped in Austria without ever being used. The remaining B 20.221 (formerly EB 196 02) received a major inspection at Stern & Hafferl in September 1971 and was used until 1976 on the Gmunden–Vorchdorf Local Railway. In October 1980, it was transferred to the Museum Stuttgart, which provisionally stored it in the former depot of the Esslingen–Nellingen–Denkendorf tramway in Nellingen for planned museum operations between Nellingen and Neuhausen auf den Fildern. After the museum plans failed, it went in June 1986 to the German Railway Society. After extensive restoration, it has been used since December 1990 on the Bruchhausen-Vilsen–Asendorf museum railway, numbered 21, either as a trailer behind powered cars or "non-authentically" in classic steam or diesel trains.

== Relics ==
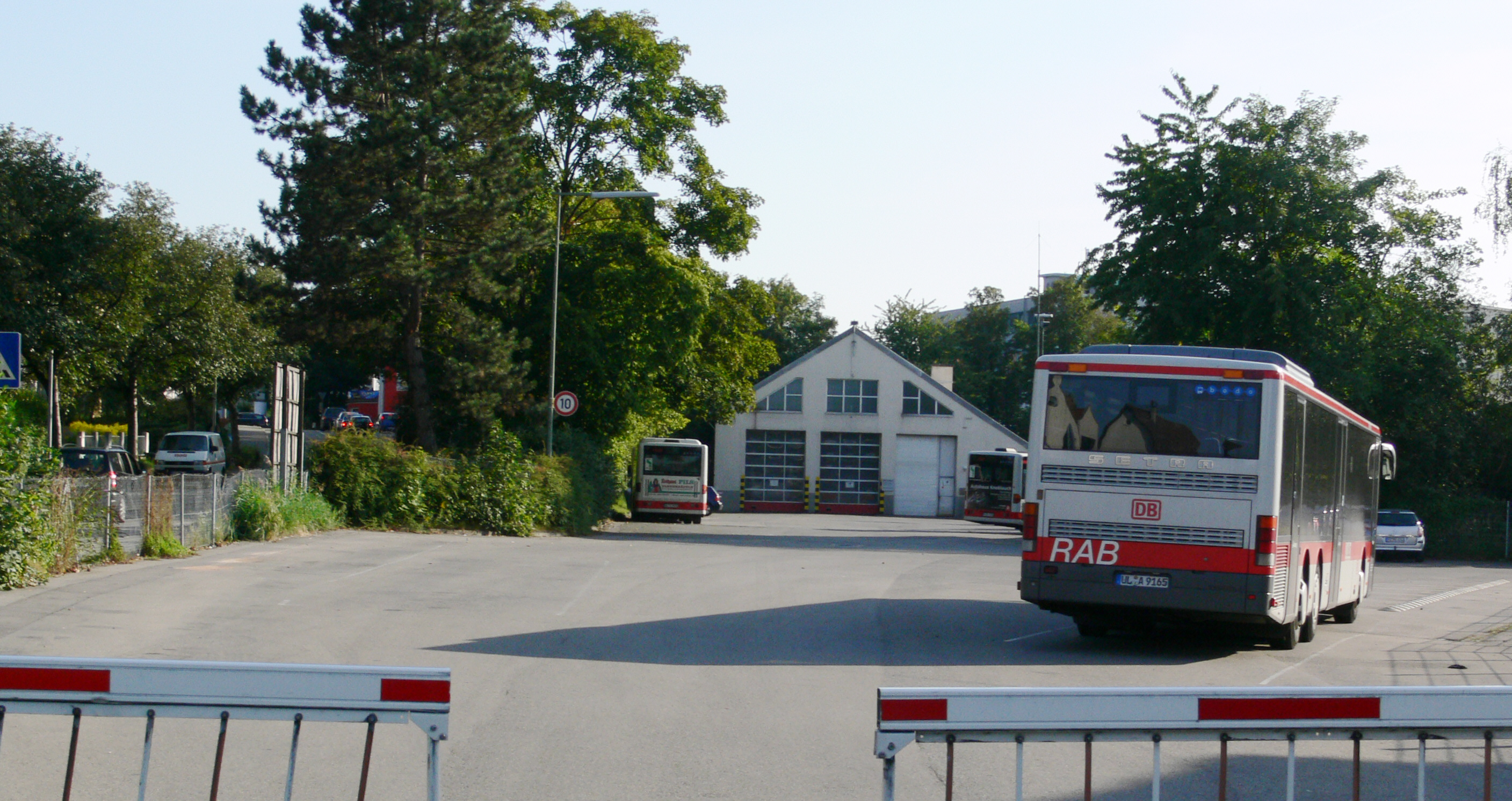
The depot built in 1910 now serves RAB buses

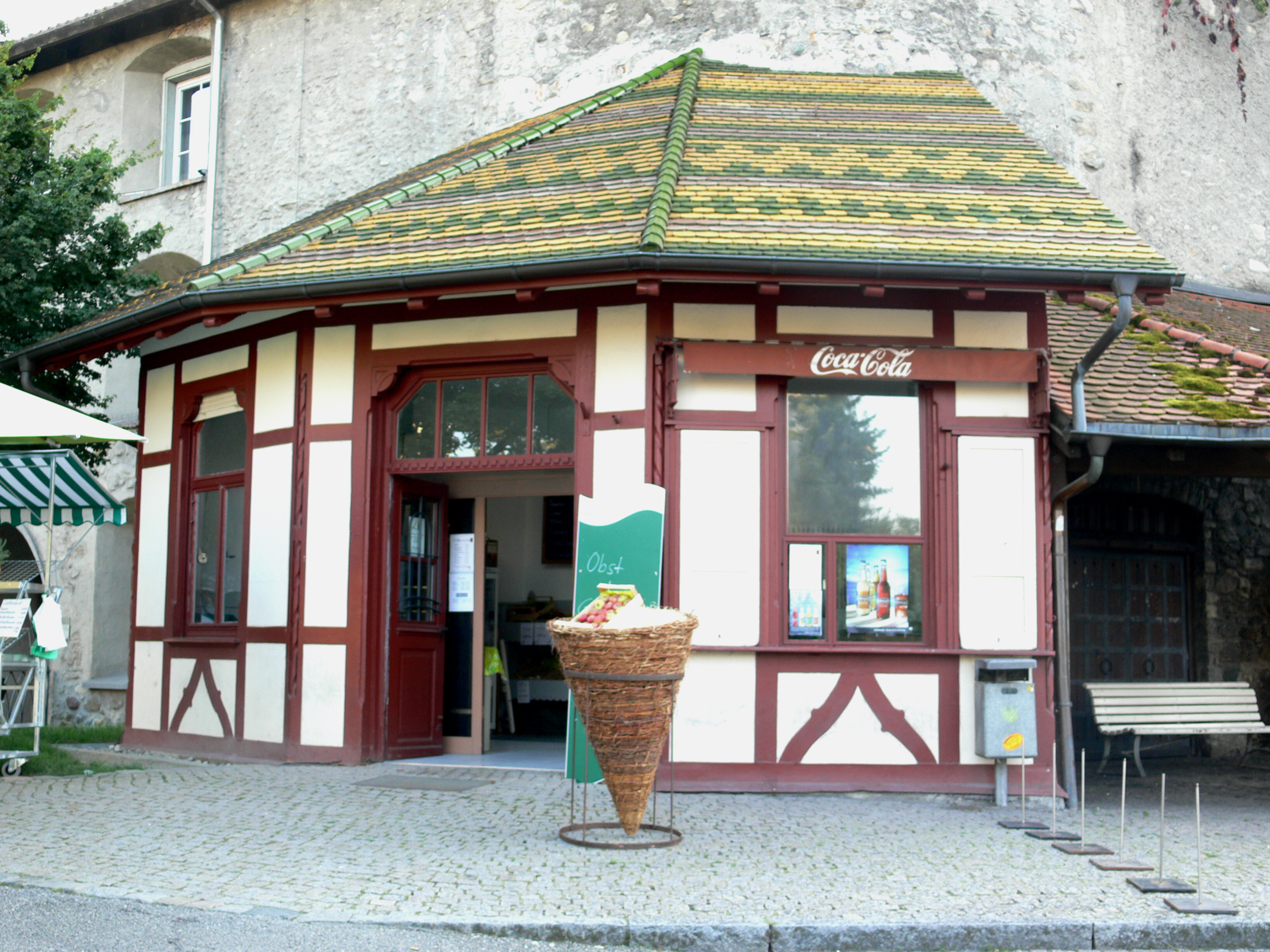
The former Frauentor station building in August 2008; the shelter attached on the right was added later and has since been demolished

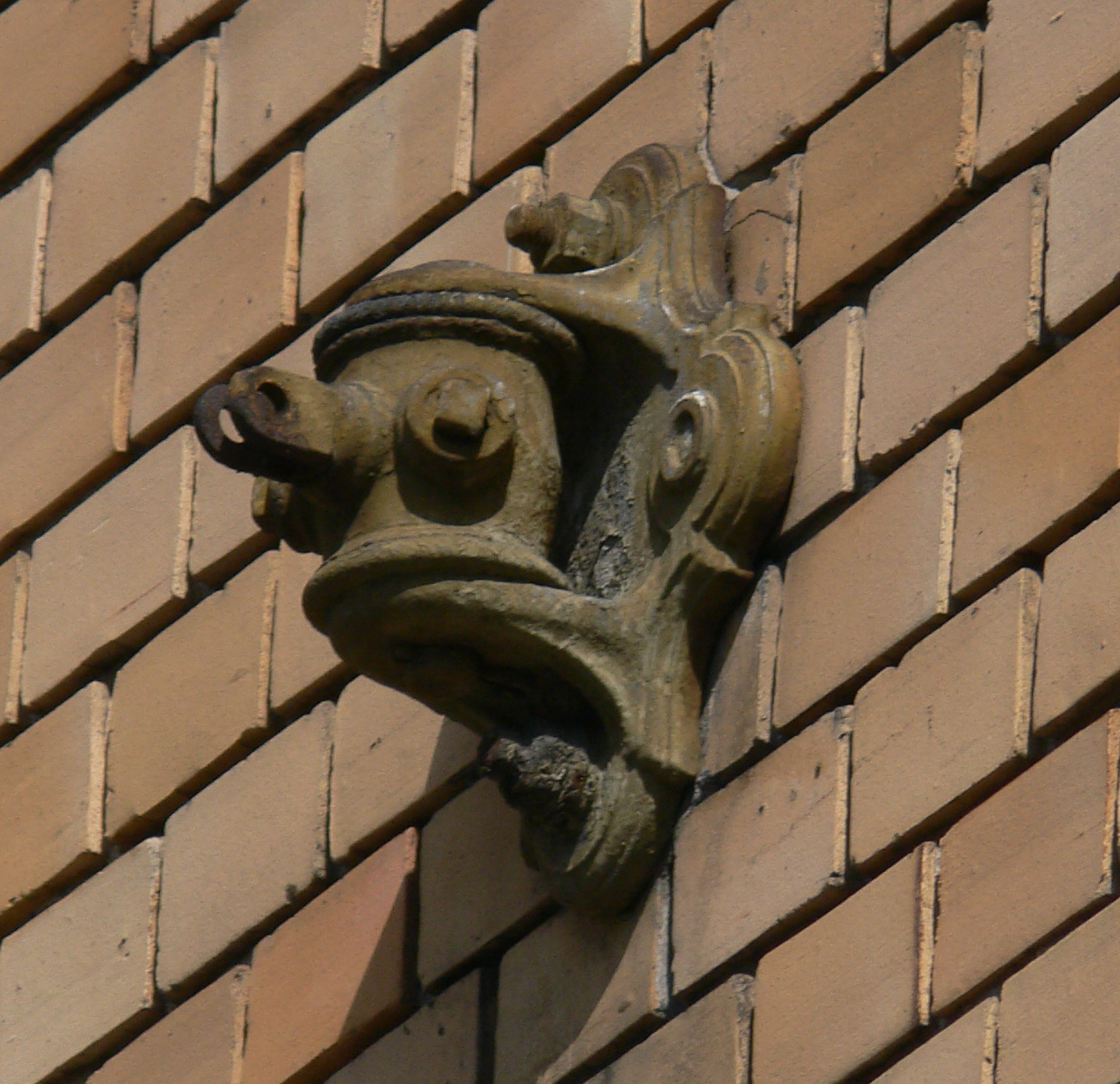
Overhead line rosette at Schussenstraße 2

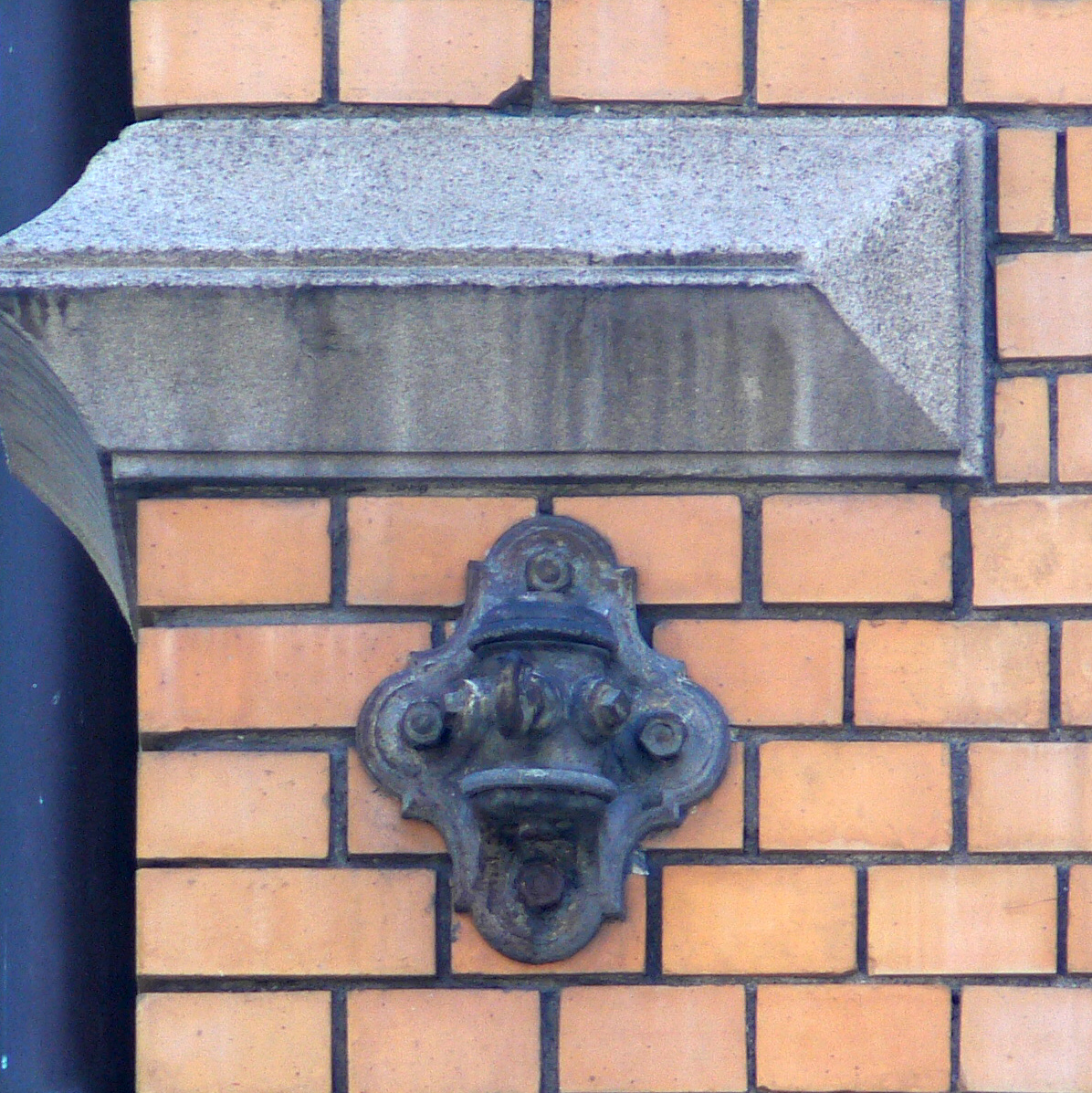
Overhead line rosette at Gartenstraße 10

Besides the three museum-preserved vehicles elsewhere, little remains of the tram; the metre-gauge sections were completely removed during road expansion. In front of Ravensburg station, the rails were long tarred over; with the new bus station around 1990, these last rail remnants were removed. The former three-rail track between Weingarten and Baienfurt, abandoned in 1999, is still partially present, but the original rails and sleepers in this section were replaced over the years with used standard-gauge track panels from other lines. Specifically, the following relics remain:

- At the former Weingarten freight yard—besides the former standard-gauge station building—the tram car hall still exists, now used as the RAB depot. It is the center of the independent RAB branch in Weingarten. Inside is a bus washing plant, among other things. Buses are also parked on the former track apron. The site thus remains state-owned.
- On the apron of the Weingarten depot, two steel overhead line poles survive, used as street lights.
- At the former Ravensburg Frauentor stop, now bus stop Ravensburg Schussenstraße, the wooden station building survives. The small house attached to the Green Tower was built around the turn of the century by LAG and used as a ticket office. Today it serves as a kiosk and is listed as a cultural monument.
- Scattered along the route, overhead line tensioning brackets remain on buildings. Besides simple wall hooks, e.g., in Weingarten's Abt-Hyller-Straße, there are seven ornately decorated overhead line rosettes from the electrification year. One each at Gartenstraße 8, Gartenstraße 10, Gartenstraße 34, Schussenstraße 2, and Schussenstraße 18; two more at the former Ravensburg machine factory complex in Schussenstraße 21.

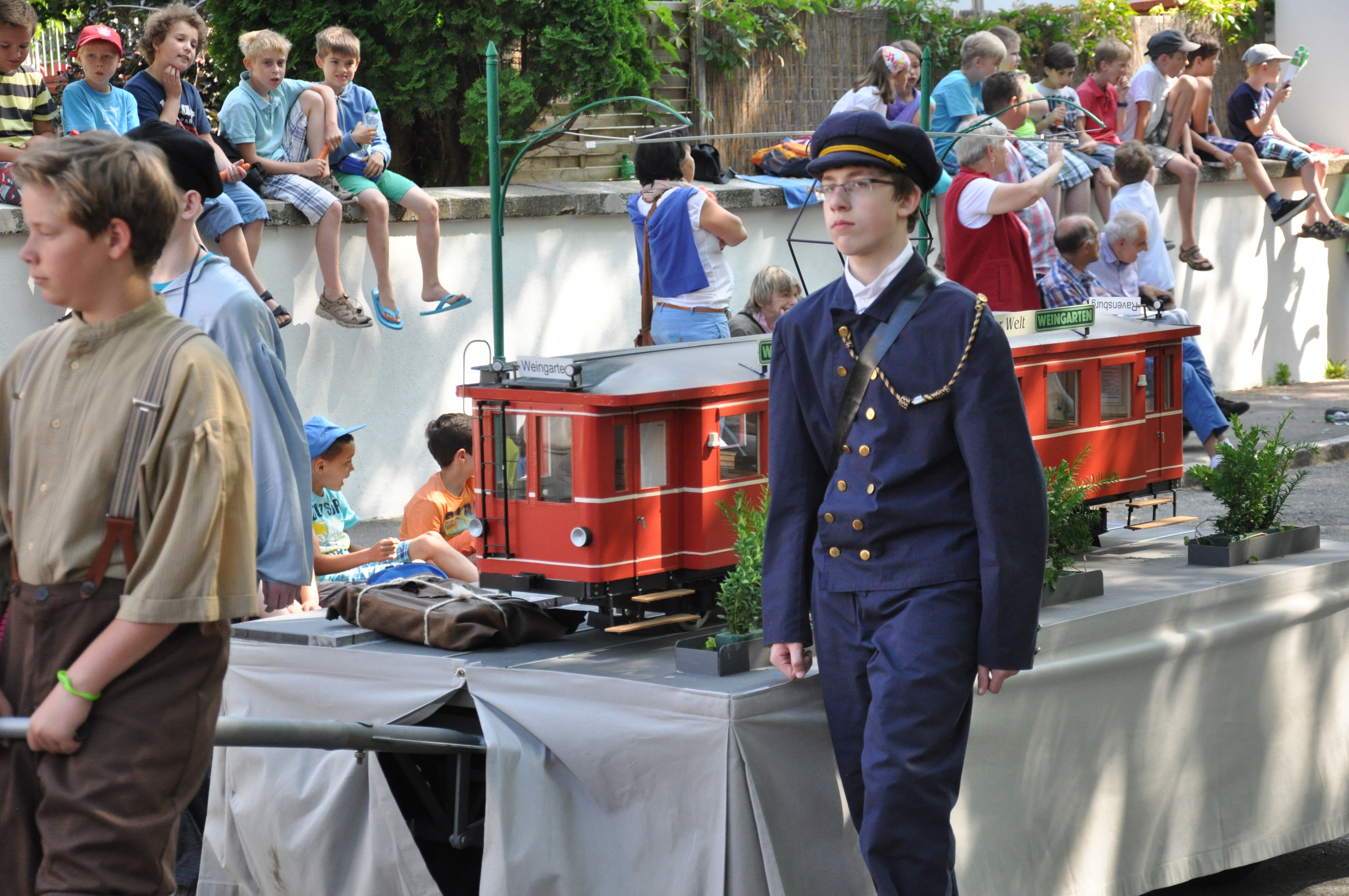
Parade at the 2013 Welfenfest

At the parade of the annual summer Welfenfest in Weingarten, a float group commemorates the "Bähnle." Schoolchildren dressed as passengers and conductors accompany a model of a powered car.

== Reactivation plans ==
From time to time, politics raises the demand to reactivate the former Ravensburg–Weingarten–Baienfurt tram as part of a modern regional light rail, for example by Alliance 90/The Greens in August 2005. The passenger association PRO BAHN also supported such a project in a position paper from January 2003. These considerations are driven not least by the great success of the Bodensee-Oberschwaben Railway launched under municipal auspices in 1993. Connections to it have also been considered, e.g., through services from Weingarten or Baienfurt to Friedrichshafen. For the former tram route, however, such reactivation would amount to a complete new build and be correspondingly expensive. Only the short section along the former three-rail track could be used, though formally it too has been dededicated since 1999.

== Other ==
Parts of the power supply no longer needed after tram closure were sold to the Austrian Montafonerbahn. This allowed it to raise the line voltage of its Bludenz–Schruns line from 720 to 900 volts DC in 1965. Since 1972, however, it has operated with the Austrian Federal Railways standard alternating current of 15 kV, 16 2/3 Hz, making the German components superfluous again.

== Bibliography ==
- Dumjahn, Horst-Werner (1984). Handbuch der deutschen Eisenbahnstrecken [Handbook of German railway routes] (in German). Mainz: Dumjahn. ISBN 3-921426-29-4.
- Hendlmeier, Wolfgang (1981). Handbuch der deutschen Straßenbahngeschichte [Manual of the history of the German tramways and trolleybus systems] (in German). Vol. 1 Text und Abbildungen. München: Selbstverl. OCLC 256386516.
- Kolb, Raimund (1987). Bähnle, Mühle, Zug und Bus: Die Bahn im mittleren Schussental [Little Train, Mill, Train and Bus: The Railway in the Middle Schussental]. Bergatreute: Wilfried Eppe. ISBN 3-890-89007-5.
- Kuchinke, Stephan (2000). Die Localbahn-Actiengesellschaft [The Localbahn company] (in German). Stuttgart: Transpress. ISBN 978-3-613-71125-9.
- Machel, Wolf-Dietger (n.d.). Neben- und Schmalspurbahnen in Deutschland einst & jetzt [Secondary and narrow-gauge railways in Germany then & now] (in German). Vol. 13 Baden-Württemberg: Ravensburg–Weingarten–Baienfurt loose-leaf folder.
- Walter, Gerhard (2020). "Reich bebilderte Geschichte und Vergleich der historischen Streckenführung mit der Situation 2020" [Richly illustrated history and comparison of the historical route with the 2020 situation].
