= Stiller Bach =

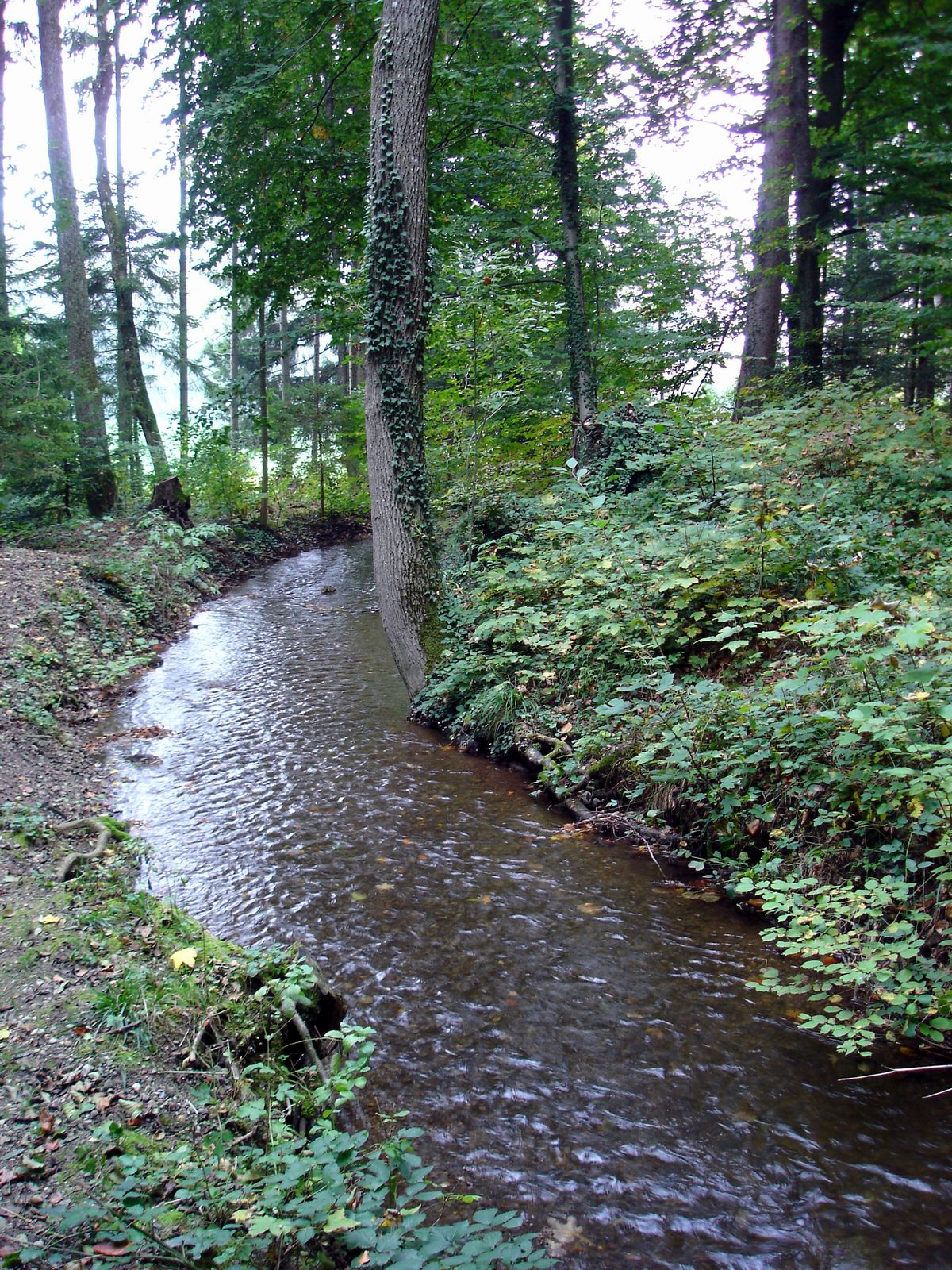

Location
- Country: Germany
- State: Baden-Württemberg

Physical characteristics
- Source
  - coordinates: 47°48′05″N 9°43′59″E
- Mouth
  - location: Scherzach
  - coordinates: 47.8043°N 9.6088°E
- Length: 10.7 km (6.6 mi)

Basin features
- Progression: Scherzach→ Schussen→ Rhine→ North Sea

Stiller Bach is a small artificial river in southern Baden-Württemberg, Germany. It flows into the Scherzach in Weingarten.

The water network of the Stiller Bach near Weingarten, in the Ravensburg district of Baden-Württemberg, is one of the oldest canal systems in Germany. It was developed by Benedictine monks during the Middle Ages to supply water to Weingarten Abbey. The network covers about 25 km² and includes ten canals and around 20 ponds.

Construction and expansion of the system took place over several centuries, from the 11th to the 17th century. The Stiller Bach is now also used as a local recreation area and forms part of a historical hydraulic-engineering trail.

== Use ==
During the Middle Ages, Weingarten Monastery depended on the Stiller Bach for a reliable water supply. The system provided water for the monastery and the upper town of Weingarten and also supplied water that could be used for firefighting. It supplied the monks with water and protected the monastery and the otherwise waterless upper town of Weingarten from devastating fires. Its water was used for bleaching cloth and operating a washhouse. Water was also directed through meadow irrigation channels, known locally as Rongsen, to irrigate and fertilize meadows in the Schussen Basin. The system also powered a number of water-driven installations. By the dissolution of the monastery in 1803, these included at least:

- eight grinding mills with 17 water wheels
- five sawmills with seven waterwheels
- three oil mills with two water wheels
- a hammer forge with two water wheels
- a bone and plaster stamp with a water wheel
- a tannery with a water wheel
- a hemp grater with a water wheel

As a result of advancing industrialization, the mills were gradually replaced and the waterways used to generate electricity. Up to twelve turbines were powered by the hydropower of the Stiller Bach, generating a total output of 1800 kW. Today, the Stiller Bach is a local recreation area, and since 1985 has been the center of a hiking trail dedicated to the history of hydraulic engineering. Brown trout are the fish that live there. The Protestant parish of Weingarten offers a baptism festival at the Stiller Bach on certain days in the summer.

== Canal network ==
The components of the irrigation system are mostly completely new creations in the gravel area above the Schussen basin and its side valleys, which was originally poor in streams. The most important springs in the system include the original spring east of the Lochmoos and the four Kocherlöcher springs near Unterankenreute, which are designated as natural monuments due to their geohydrological peculiarities. In order to tap into several productive source areas, the canals often cross regional watersheds. To avoid maintenance-intensive canal bridges (aqueducts), the upper reaches of the Stille Bach had to be constructed with a minimal gradient, meaning it had to flow around hills or depressions. Due to this objective and the sometimes very slight gradient of the terrain, determining an optimal flow path was extremely complex and, given the tools available in the Middle Ages, is to be regarded as a masterpiece of engineering.

The network has consisted of ten interconnected canals since the Renaissance period and had been expanded to a length of 11.5 km by 1605. Of the formerly up to 30 reservoirs of the Stiller Bach, only nine are now artificial lakes. Important for ensuring year-round water flow are the Lochmoos moorland water reservoir in the upper reaches, the over 800 year old Rößlerweiher as the central switching point of the system and the Mahlweiher in Nessenreben in the lower reaches. Nessenreben refers to a medieval clearing island above Weingarten, which was initially managed by the monastery and then, after secularization, as state domain. The Nessenreben Mahlweiher stores the water of the Stiller Bach before it rushes down the lower reaches to Weingarten with a steep gradient. The Stiller Bach then flows into the Scherzach in the Weingarten district. The fragility of the facility is demonstrated by repeated damage caused by landslides, most recently in February 2022.

See also : List of natural monuments in Schlier (municipality)

== Rößlerweiher ==
The Rößlerweiher, also known as Rößler Weiher or Rösslerweiher, originated in the landscape left by the retreat of the Rhine glacier about 10,000 years ago. A later collapse of the moraine dam released water into the Scherzach valley and contributed to the formation of the Hochtobel ravine.

A replacement dam was subsequently built at the site. The reservoir is recorded in a Hohenstaufen document from 1155 under the name Lacus Grindel, meaning "dam lake".

This makes the 20- hectare pond one of the oldest reservoirs in Central Europe. It has been used for energy and fishing for over 800 years and fulfills an important function in Weingarten's flood protection system. The Stille Bach stream plays a central role in all of this.

The Rößlerweiher pond, located near Unterankenreute in the municipality of Schlier, has traditionally been a popular local recreation area for swimmers, ice skaters, and hikers. Since 1989, a 5.5 km long, signposted hiking trail has been established around the Rößlerweiher. Today, it is used as a state-owned fishing lake by the Ravensburg District Forestry Office. Every year, on the second Wednesday in October, the autumn carp harvest takes place here, producing approximately four tons of fish.

== Water level regulation ==
Together with four other canals, the Altweiher Canal forms the upper reaches of the Stiller Bach. It has been carrying water from the Wolfegger Ach catchment area to the Rößlerweiher pond since the 16th century. The Altweiher Canal, coming from the north, and the Kehrenberger Mühlkanal, which runs along the eastern shore of the Rößlerweiher pond, meet at a canal junction immediately before flowing into the Rößlerweiher pond. From there, the water flows both into the Rößlerweiher pond and into a deeply cut interim canal, which is separated from the Rößlerweiher pond by a 300-meter-long dam. At the junction is the trap stock, a device that can be pulled out and closed so that the interim canal absorbs all of the upper water. This happens in the event of a flood or when the Rößlerweiher pond is being fished out .

With the help of a weir, a barrier structure at the outlet of the Rößlerweiher, the water level in the Stiller Bach, or rather, the pond, can be further regulated. In addition, there are two additional weirs in the Altdorf Forest to keep floodwater away from the Stiller Bach.

== Hochtobel ==
After leaving the Rößlerweiher pond, the Stille Bach stream flows in an exposed path along the mountainside of the Hochtobel gorge. Its route is reminiscent of irrigation canals of similar characteristics in South Tyrol (see "Waale ") and the Swiss canton of Valais (see " Suonen /Bisses").

Until the 1980s, the Hochtobel ravine repeatedly experienced violent eruptions after the waters of the Stiller Bach had been dammed by wind damage. These former mudslides leading to the Schwarzbächle stream, which flows 50 meters below, are still visible as deep gullies in the steep slope. Landslides have also occurred in this area recently.

Since the monks couldn't bypass the Hochtobel ravine because they needed the water in Nessenreben for their dairy, meadows, and mills, they nurtured the natural vegetation, whose roots protected the edges from erosion. Later, the most dangerous section of the medieval route was replaced by a shorter connection. For the approximately 100-meter-long and 10-meter-deep cut through the Lindenberg, nearly 10,000 m³ of soil had to ^{be} excavated using simple means.

== Benedictine canal systems in Upper Swabia ==
In addition to the Stillen Bach, there are two other canal systems in Upper Swabian Benedictine monasteries:

- Krummbach in Ochsenhausen
- Motzenbach in Ottobeuren

Since 2005, all three systems have been part of the approximately 100 stations on the Mühlenstraße Oberschwaben .

== Trivia ==
The Stille Bach is the subject of a regional crime novel by Regina Riest from 2018.

He was portrayed in a Südwestrundfunk broadcast on 13 September 2021 with Michael Maurer.

== Pictures ==
- Topographic map of the Stillen Bach

== literature ==
- The Stille Bach and its waters. City of Weingarten, 2005.
- Elmar Bereuter: Upper Swabia – Swabian Children's Trails, Bregenz, Friedrichshafen, Ravensburg, Wolfegg. Rother Hiking Guide, Bergverlag Rother, Munich 2010, pp. 182ff.
- Michael Grimm: An Attempt at a History of the Former Imperial Town and the Still-Famous Pilgrimage Site of Altdorf, Called Weingarten, and Its Surroundings. Self-published by the Author/Dorn'sche Buchhandlung, Ravensburg 1864, pp. 248f.
- Lutz Dietrich Herbst: The Silent Stream – Benedictine Water Management between Schlier and Weingarten. In: Monument Preservation in Baden-Württemberg, No. 3/2018, pp. 200–205.
- Lutz Dietrich Herbst: The Silent Stream – A Unique Evidence of Medieval Hydraulic Engineering in Upper Swabia (Weingarten University Publications, No. 1). Weingarten University of Education, 1982.
- Lutz Dietrich Herbst: The Silent Stream – Hydraulic Engineering History Trail. Brochure. Ravensburg District Office, 1985.
- Lutz Dietrich Herbst: Developed Rivers of the Middle Ages and the Early Modern Period in Upper Swabia as Study Areas for Historical Geography (Weingarten University Publications, No. 17). Dissertation, Weingarten University of Education, 1992.

== See also ==
- List of rivers of Baden-Württemberg
