= List of twin towns and sister cities in Belarus =

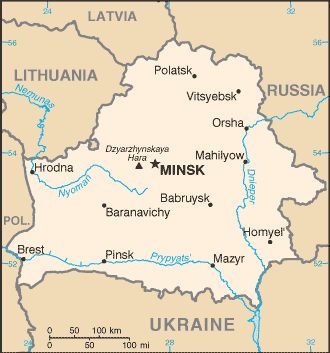
Map of Belarus

This is a list of municipalities in Belarus which have standing links to local communities in other countries known as "town twinning" (usually in Europe) or "sister cities" (usually in the rest of the world).

== B ==
Babruysk

- Anenii Noi District, Moldova
- Comrat, Moldova
- Grozny, Russia
- Hengyang, China
- Ishim, Russia
- (Georgia (country)) Kobuleti, Georgia
- Kolpino, Russia
- Kostroma, Russia
- Luga, Russia
- Morogoro, Tanzania
- Murom, Russia
- Naro-Fominsk, Russia
- Novomoskovsk, Russia
- Oskemen, Kazakhstan
- Petrogradsky (Saint Petersburg), Russia
- Rybinsk, Russia
- Sokolniki (Moscow), Russia
- Syzran, Russia
- Tolyatti, Russia
- Ussuriysk, Russia
- Vladimir, Russia

Baranavichy

- Biała Podlaska, Poland
- Chibi, China
- Kaliningrad, Russia
- Karlovo, Bulgaria
- Kineshma, Russia
- Konyaaltı, Turkey
- Magadan, Russia
- Mytishchi, Russia
- Nacka, Sweden
- Poltava, Ukraine
- Solntsevo (Moscow), Russia
- Stockerau, Austria
- Sulęcin County, Poland
- Vasileostrovsky (Saint Petersburg), Russia
- Yeysky District, Russia

Barysaw

- Gagarin, Russia
- Maloyaroslavets, Russia
- Melitopol, Ukraine
- Mytishchi, Russia
- Noginsk, Russia
- Podolsk, Russia
- Yelets, Russia
- Yeysk, Russia

Brest

- Ashdod, Israel
- Astrakhan, Russia
- Baienfurt, Germany
- Baindt, Germany
- Baiyin, China
- (Georgia (country)) Batumi, Georgia
- Berg, Germany
- Biała Podlaska, Poland
- Coevorden, Netherlands
- Dorogomilovo (Moscow), Russia
- Izhevsk, Russia
- Kaliningrad, Russia
- Kovrov, Russia
- Malgobek, Russia
- Nakhchivan, Azerbaijan
- Nevsky (Saint Petersburg), Russia
- Nizhny Tagil, Russia
- Novorossiysk, Russia
- Petrozavodsk, Russia
- Pleven, Bulgaria
- Port-sur-Saône, France
- Ravensburg, Germany
- Ryazan, Russia
- Siedlce County, Poland
- Subotica, Serbia
- Terespol, Poland
- Tyumen, Russia
- Weingarten, Germany
- Xiaogan, China

== G ==
Gomel

- Anapa, Russia
- Armavir, Russia
- Bryansk, Russia
- Burgas, Bulgaria
- Chengdu, China
- Cheryomushki (Moscow), Russia
- Clermont-Ferrand, France
- Donetsk, Ukraine
- Fort Myers, United States
- Harbin, China
- Huai'an, China
- Kaliningrad, Russia
- Krasnoselsky (Saint Petersburg), Russia
- Kurgan, Russia
- Kursk, Russia
- (Georgia (country)) Kutaisi, Georgia
- Magnitogorsk, Russia
- Novi Sad, Serbia
- Omsk, Russia
- Protvino, Russia
- Rostov-on-Don, Russia
- Samara, Russia
- Solomianskyi (Kyiv), Ukraine
- Ulyanovsk, Russia
- Vasileostrovsky (Saint Petersburg), Russia
- Voronezh, Russia

Grodno

- Ashkelon, Israel
- Cheboksary, Russia
- Dzerzhinsk, Russia
- Khimki, Russia
- Kraljevo, Serbia
- Limoges, France
- Minden, Germany
- Qabala District, Azerbaijan
- Shchukino (Moscow), Russia
- Tambov, Russia
- Tuapsinsky District, Russia
- Vologda, Russia

== I ==
Iwye

- Aznakayevo, Russia
- Sokółka, Poland

== K ==
Kapyl

- Chekhovsky District, Russia
- Matveyevo-Kurgansky District, Russia
- Tsentralny (Minsk), Belarus
- Wanzhou (Chongqing), China

Karelichy

- Krasnogorsk, Russia
- Mitino (Moscow), Russia
- Tukums, Latvia

Krupki

- Gagarin, Russia
- Solnechnogorsk, Russia

== L ==
Lida

- Daugavpils, Latvia
- Dimitrovgrad, Russia
- Goychay, Azerbaijan
- Kalachinsky District, Russia
- Khoroshyovo-Mnyovniki (Moscow), Russia
- Krymsky District, Russia
- Lebedyansky District, Russia
- Lyuberetsky District, Russia
- Nemansky District, Russia
- Rîșcani, Moldova
- Shirak Province, Armenia

== M ==
Maladzyechna

- Bor, Russia
- Cherepovets, Russia
- Dąbrowa Białostocka, Poland
- Esslingen am Neckar, Germany
- Florești, Moldova
- Frunzensky (Saint Petersburg), Russia
- Kachkanar, Russia
- Kolomensky District, Russia
- Kolomna, Russia
- Kutno County, Poland
- Kuzminki (Moscow), Russia
- Lyubytinsky District, Russia
- Slavyansky District, Russia
- Sokółka, Poland
- Svetly, Russia
- Velingrad, Bulgaria

Mazyr

- Severodvinsk, Russia

Minsk

- Abu Dhabi, United Arab Emirates
- Ankara, Turkey
- Beijing, China
- Bengaluru, India
- Bishkek, Kyrgyzstan
- Bonn, Germany
- Changchun, China
- Chișinău, Moldova
- Detroit, United States
- Dushanbe, Tajikistan
- Eindhoven, Netherlands
- Gaziantep, Turkey
- Hanoi, Vietnam
- Havana, Cuba
- Ho Chi Minh City, Vietnam
- Islamabad, Pakistan
- Kaluga, Russia
- Murmansk, Russia
- Nizhny Novgorod, Russia
- Novosibirsk, Russia
- Rostov-on-Don, Russia
- Sendai, Japan
- Shanghai, China
- Shenzhen, China
- (Georgia (country)) Tbilisi, Georgia
- Tehran, Iran
- Ufa, Russia
- Ulyanovsk, Russia

Mogilev

- Angarsk, Russia
- Astrakhan, Russia
- Balashikha, Russia
- Bursa, Turkey
- Changsha, China
- Chelyabinsk, Russia
- Eisenach, Germany
- Gabrovo, Bulgaria
- Grozny, Russia
- Khabarovsk, Russia
- Kragujevac, Serbia
- Nanjing, China
- Omsk, Russia
- Penza, Russia
- Smolensk, Russia
- Sokolinaya Gora (Moscow), Russia
- Sumgait, Azerbaijan
- Tabriz, Iran
- Tobolsk, Russia
- Tula, Russia
- Villeurbanne, France
- Vladivostok, Russia
- Vologda, Russia
- Wittenberg, Germany
- Zhengzhou, China
- Zvenigorod, Russia

== N ==
Navahrudak

- Bolsheboldinsky District, Russia
- Elbląg, Poland
- Halych, Ukraine
- Krynica Morska, Poland

Novopolotsk

- Chauffailles, France
- Dmitrovsky (Moscow), Russia
- Elektrostal, Russia
- Givors, France
- Kruševac, Serbia
- Kstovo, Russia
- Kursk, Russia
- Odintsovo, Russia
- Orekhovo-Zuyevo, Russia
- Pantelej (Niš), Serbia
- Pavlovsk, Russia
- Pushkin, Russia
- Skadovsk, Ukraine

Nyasvizh

- Carmel (Har Hevron), Israel
- Gatchinsky District, Russia
- Goris, Armenia
- Ismayilli, Azerbaijan
- Markivka Raion, Ukraine
- Odolanów, Poland
- Puławy, Poland
- Reutov, Russia
- Rosolini, Italy
- Silivri, Turkey
- Starobilsk Raion, Ukraine
- Zemun (Belgrade), Serbia
- Złotów, Poland

== O ==
Orsha

- Asha, Russia
- Balashovsky District, Russia
- Bălți, Moldova
- Bondeno, Italy
- Dubna, Russia
- Gagarin, Russia
- Ivanovo, Russia
- Kardymovsky District, Russia
- Koptevo (Moscow), Russia
- Krasnogvardeysky (Saint Petersburg), Russia
- Mārupe, Latvia
- Nanchang, China
- Pernik, Bulgaria
- Pushkino, Russia
- Qiannan Buyei and Miao, China
- Qingdao, China
- Shishou, China
- Silifke, Turkey
- Smolensk, Russia
- Spitak, Armenia
- Tver, Russia
- Vaulx-en-Velin, France
- Volgodonsk, Russia
- Vyazma, Russia
- Yiwu, China
- Zapadnoye Degunino (Moscow), Russia

== P ==
Pinsk

- Altena, Germany
- Balakhna, Russia
- Dobrich, Bulgaria
- Domodedovo, Russia
- Hola Prystan, Ukraine
- Istra, Russia
- Kakhovka, Ukraine
- Kovel, Ukraine
- Ternopil, Ukraine
- Xiangyang, China

Polotsk

- Alaverdi, Armenia
- Bălți, Moldova
- Beskudnikovsky (Moscow), Russia
- Elektrostal, Russia
- Friedrichshafen, Germany
- Kansk, Russia
- Kursk, Russia
- Mingachevir, Azerbaijan
- Polevskoy, Russia
- Rēzekne Municipality, Latvia
- Rostov, Russia
- Sokol (Moscow), Russia
- Suoyarvsky District, Russia
- Tosno, Russia
- (Georgia (country)) Tsqaltubo, Georgia
- Velikiye Luki, Russia

== R ==
Rahachow

- Buzuluk, Russia
- Kotelniki, Russia
- Zviahel, Ukraine

Rechytsa

- Bălți, Moldova
- Belek (Serik), Turkey
- Kyustendil, Bulgaria
- Lgovsky District, Russia
- Myrhorod, Ukraine
- Ocnița District, Moldova
- Świdnik, Poland

== S ==
Salihorsk

- Agarak (Meghri), Armenia
- Aleksin, Russia
- Ceadîr-Lunga, Moldova
- Chernyakhovsk, Russia
- Comrat, Moldova
- Holbæk, Denmark
- Kohtla-Järve, Estonia
- Lazarevsky (Sochi), Russia
- Lefortovo (Moscow), Russia
- Podolsky District, Russia
- Severo-Yeniseysky District, Russia
- Sol-Iletsky District, Russia
- Tarashcha Raion, Ukraine
- Volotovsky District, Russia
- Voskresensk, Russia
- Xianning, China

Shchuchyn

- Guryevsk, Russia
- Olecko County, Poland
- Szczuczyn, Poland
- Yuzhnoye Tushino (Moscow), Russia

Slawharad

- Arzamas, Russia

Slonim

- Aleksandrów Kujawski, Poland
- Czechowice-Dziedzice, Poland
- Gvardeysky District, Russia
- Nieszawa, Poland
- Sergiyev Posad, Russia
- Severnoye Tushino (Moscow), Russia
- Szypliszki, Poland
- Telenești District, Moldova
- Torzhok, Russia
- Tundzha, Bulgaria

Slutsk

- Brovary Raion, Ukraine
- Kalevalsky District, Russia
- Moshenskoy District, Russia
- Ryazansky (Moscow), Russia
- Rzhev, Russia
- Serpukhov, Russia
- Shaki, Azerbaijan
- Sisian, Armenia
- Staromaynsky District, Russia

Smalyavichy

- Basarabeasca, Moldova
- Belorechensk, Russia
- Gorna Oryahovitsa, Bulgaria
- Kagalnitsky District, Russia
- Myrhorod, Ukraine
- Mytishchi, Russia
- Września County, Poland
- Yiwu, China

Svietlahorsk

- Călărași District, Moldova
- Călărași, Romania
- Chernushinsky District, Russia
- Helmstedt, Germany
- Ivanteyevka, Russia
- Kingisepp, Russia
- Kommunar, Russia
- Mendip, England, United Kingdom
- (Georgia (country)) Mtskheta, Georgia
- Obzor (Nesebar), Bulgaria
- Sliven, Bulgaria
- Svetly, Russia

Syanno

- Goszczanów, Poland
- Peschanokopsky District, Russia
- Pochinkovsky District, Russia
- Porkhovsky District, Russia

== U ==
Uzda

- Grobiņa, Latvia
- Shatura, Russia
- Shimsky District, Russia
- Yovon, Tajikistan

== V ==
Vitebsk

- Astrakhan, Russia
- Bălți, Moldova
- Beloyarsky District, Russia
- Daugavpils, Latvia
- Frankfurt an der Oder, Germany
- Gelendzhik, Russia
- Harbin, China
- Irkutsk, Russia
- Jinan, China
- Lipetsk, Russia
- Nienburg, Germany
- Niš, Serbia
- Pskov, Russia
- Rēzekne, Latvia
- Smolensk, Russia
- Vanadzor, Armenia
- Zielona Góra, Poland

== Z ==
Zelva

- Dobrzyniewo Duże, Poland
- Jaunjelgava, Latvia
- Knyszyn, Poland

Zhlobin

- Scalenghe, Italy
- Smederevo, Serbia
- Vyksa, Russia

Zhodzina

- Dalanzadgad, Mongolia
- Hîncești, Moldova
- Horishni Plavni, Ukraine
- Kajaran, Armenia
- Mytishchi, Russia
- Neryungrinsky District, Russia
- Olmaliq, Uzbekistan
- Oryol, Russia
- Panagyurishte, Bulgaria
- Plastovsky District, Russia
- Považská Bystrica, Slovakia
- (Georgia (country)) Rustavi, Georgia
- Verkhnyaya Pyshma, Russia
- Zheleznogorsk, Russia
