= Baienfurt =

- Municipality
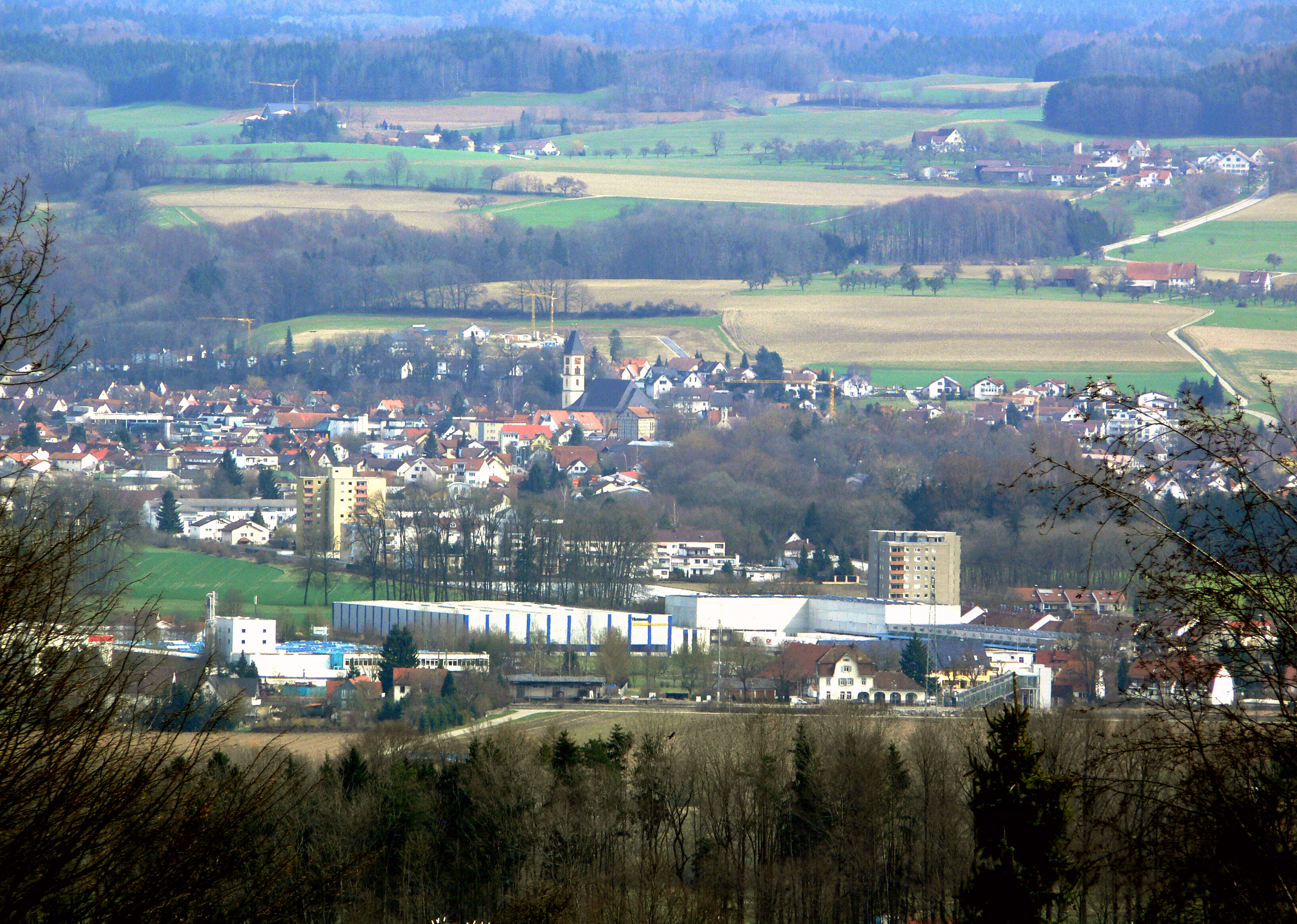
- Baienfurt

- Coat of arms

- Location of Baienfurt within Ravensburg district
- Interactive map of Baienfurt
- Location within Germany Location within Baden-Württemberg
- Coordinates: 47°49′37″N 09°39′06″E
- Country: Germany
- State: Baden-Württemberg
- Admin. region: Tübingen
- District: Ravensburg
- Municipal assoc.: Mittleres Schussental

Government
  - Mayor (2021–29): Günter Binder

Area
  - Total: 16.02 km^{2} (6.19 sq mi)
- Elevation: 459 m (1,506 ft)

Population (2025-12-31)
  - Total: 7,403
  - Density: 462.1/km^{2} (1,197/sq mi)
- Time zone: UTC+01:00 (CET)
  - Summer (DST): UTC+02:00 (CEST)
- Postal codes: 88255
- Dialling codes: 0751
- Vehicle registration: RV
- Website: www.baienfurt.de

Baienfurt (Low Alemannic: Boeafurt) is an Upper Swabian municipality in the district of Ravensburg in Baden-Württemberg, Germany. The municipality, with a population of over 7,000 inhabitants, is part of the Middle Schussental Municipal Administration Association.

== Geography ==
=== Geographical Location ===
Baienfurt is part of the settlement area of Middle Schussental, which extends from Eschach, a southern district of Ravensburg, through the two cities of Ravensburg and Weingarten to Baienfurt and Baindt in the north. It is located a few kilometers west of the Altdorfer Wald on the banks of the Schussen, a northern tributary of Lake Constance or the Rhine, and is traversed by the Wolfegger Ach, a tributary of the Schussen.

=== Neighboring Municipalities ===
Starting from the north, Baienfurt borders Fronreute, Baindt, Bergatreute, Schlier, Weingarten, and Berg.

=== Administrative Divisions ===
In addition to the main town, Baienfurt includes the districts and residential areas of Niederbiegen, Köpfingen, Kickach, Baumgarten, and Briach, as well as the residential area of Neubriach.

=== Protected Areas ===
Baienfurt has a minimal share in the north of the Annaberg nature reserve and an equally minimal share in the southernmost part of the Laurental and Rößlerweiher landscape protection area.

In addition, parts of the FFH areas Schussenbecken with Tobelwälder south of Blitzenreute and Altdorfer Wald are located in Baienfurt.

== History ==
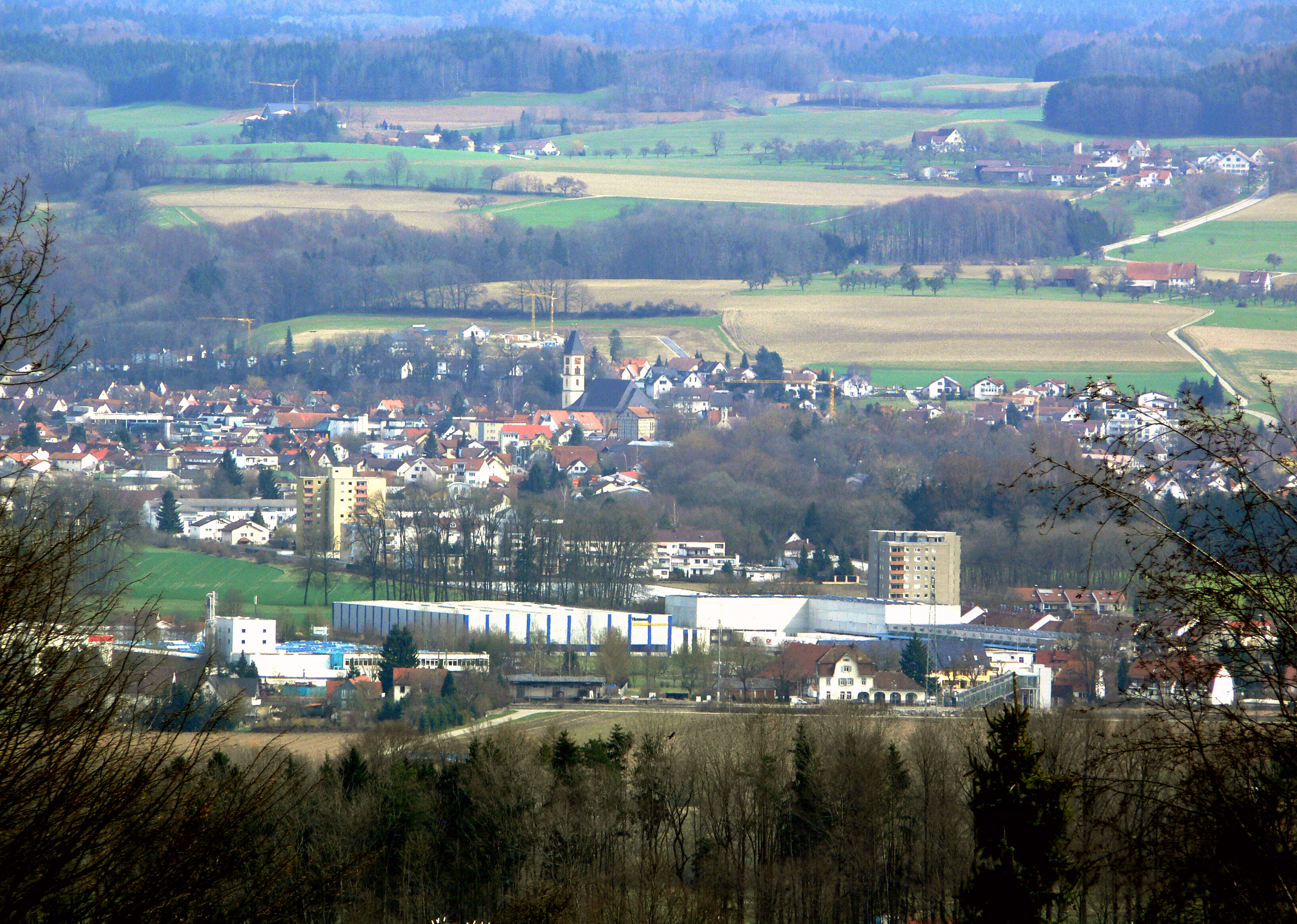
View of Baienfurt from the west

Through archaeological findings, Celtic settlement traces in the municipal area are evidenced. There is a burial mound from the Hallstatt period. In the area of the present-day districts of Rain and Kickach, there were Roman estates.

The settlement of Baienfurt probably emerged in the 9th century. The name Baienfurt, also written as Baier, Beierfurt, or Paigerfurt in early documents, derives from a ford across the Wolfegger Ach. Baien is derived from baie, beige (= opening), while other sources mention an origin from Bai (= sedge).

Likely before 1090 under Welf IV, the Lords of Waldburg received the village as a fief. In 1143, the village of Binningen is first mentioned in documents as the property of the Weingarten Abbey, and Kickach is mentioned for the first time in 1148. In 1278, a chapel dedicated to St. Blaise was erected in Briach. In 1525, Baienfurt and its surroundings were a scene of the German Peasants' War. The lords of Waldburg held the lordship until 1587 when, in a settlement of the Vorarlbergian Swabian district with its seat in the neighboring Altdorf (today Weingarten), they transferred the sovereignty. Baienfurt became the administrative center of the district, with property ownership shared between the district, as well as the Weingarten and Baindt abbeys. In 1806, Baienfurt became part of the Kingdom of Württemberg with the Vorarlbergian district (district of Ravensburg, Um-Altdorf office).

In 1826, the village was merged with other parts of the former Um-Altdorf office and the settlement around the Baindt Abbey to form the municipality of Baindt, with Baienfurt as its administrative seat. However, the persistent efforts of the Baienfurters for independence succeeded 22 years later when, on 20 September 1848, the municipality was appointed as an independent administrative district.

In 1850, Baienfurt was connected to the network of Württemberg railways with the neighboring Niederbiegen railway station on the Württemberg Southern Railway.

With the establishment of a paper mill from 1870 onwards, the village, which had been predominantly rural until then, became an industrial location and has since grown steadily.

In 1934, the Vorarlberg district was renamed Ravensburg district, and in 1938, as part of the administrative reform during the Nazi era in Württemberg, it was transferred to the Ravensburg district. After World War II, Baienfurt, along with the Ravensburg district, fell into the French occupation zone and thus became part of the newly founded state of Württemberg-Hohenzollern, which merged in 1952 as the South Württemberg-Hohenzollern administrative region into the state of Baden-Württemberg.

From 1970 to 1977, a modern town center with a town hall, community hall, marketplace, and indoor swimming pool was built. A proposed merger of the municipality with Ravensburg, Weingarten, and Baindt as part of the municipal reform in 1975 did not materialize due to lack of approval from the population in the Schussental.

Population Development
Year	1849	1888	1910	1939	1959	1987	1991	1995	1999	2005	2010	2015
Population	800	1200	1750	2900	4100	7000	6620	6883	7200	7293	7194	7138

== Politics ==
=== Municipal Council ===
The municipal council election on 26 May 2019 resulted in the outcome depicted in the adjacent diagram.

Total 18 seats
- SPD: 2
- Greens: 5
- Christian Democratic Union of Germany: 6
- FW (Free voters): 5

=== Mayors ===
List of Mayors of Baienfurt from 1848 to the present:

Tenure	Name	Notes
1848–1870	Johann Baptist Mehrle	
1870–1872	Alois Mangold	
1872–1919	Gebhard Mehrle	Responsible for the 1911 connection to the Ravensburg–Weingarten–Baienfurt tram line.
1919–1929	Otto Mehrle	
1929–1938	Leo Lacher	
1938–1945	Emil Teufel	Appointed, not democratically elected
1945–1946	Karl Kurz	Military government under French occupation
1946–1949	Johann Mehrle	
1949–1961	Karl Rittler	
1961–1989	Maximillian „Max“ Brenner	(1929–2007), awarded honorary citizenship in 1989
1989–2013	Robert Wiedemann	Tenure until December 2013, awarded honorary citizenship of the municipality of Baienfurt in December 2013.
Since 2013	Günter A. Binder	CDU, former head of the main office in Bodnegg, elected on September 22, 2013, with 93.1% of the vote. Re-elected on September 26, 2021, with 86.6% of the vote.

The former mayor, Robert Wiedemann, did not run for re-election in December 2013 after 24 years in office. In 2013, only two candidates emerged as possible successors, one of whom was labeled by the local press more or less as a "joke candidate" as he represented the "NO! Idea Party".

=== Coat of Arms ===
Coat of Arms of the Municipality of Baienfurt

Explanation of the Coat of Arms: From 1830 to around 1918, the special cultivation of weaver's combs was practiced in Baienfurt. At that time, the textile industry needed this type of thistle to raise certain fabrics, and they were sold in Baienfurt at their own comb market, which was announced by hanging blue and white flags. At the suggestion of the Stuttgart Archives Directorate, the municipality established a coat of arms in 1931 that addresses this peculiarity. In July 2000, a bronze monument to the comb was erected in front of the evangelical church. Since January 2011, the bronze monument has been located in front of the "Neunerbeck" in Baienfurt, which is one of the oldest houses in the municipality and houses a comb museum, fitting to the monument.

== Culture and Sights ==
=== Art, Music, Theater ===
Since 1997, the cultural association Manufaktur has been organizing concerts, theater performances, cabaret events, and exhibitions in the listed Speidlerhaus from 1673.

In 2011, Uli Boettcher opened the cabaret stage Hoftheater in a converted barn in the Hof district.

=== Buildings ===
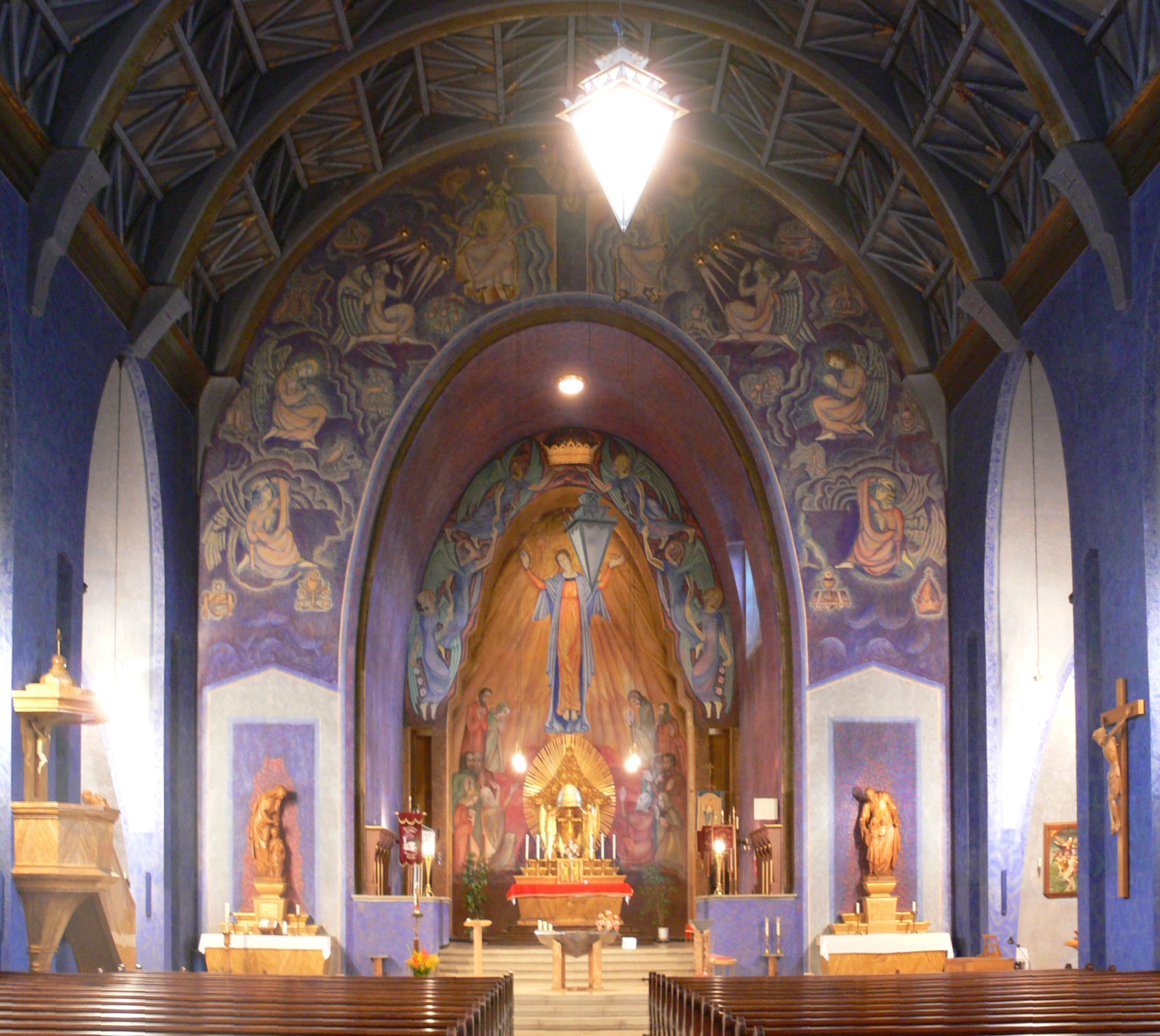
Church of the Assumption of Mary

- The Catholic Parish Church of the Assumption of Mary (Marienkirche) was built from 1925 to 1927 according to the design of the Stuttgart architect Otto Linder. The reinforced concrete construction with its characteristic parabolic vault is a unique example of church architecture from the Expressionist movement of the 1920s, not least due to the well-preserved, atmospherically painted dark blue tones by Alois Schenk. The tower was only completed in 1953.
- The Blasius Chapel (13th/17th century) in the Briach hamlet is significantly older.
- The Evangelical Church "and der Aach" was built in 1890 as a Catholic place of worship, used from 1927 to 1952 as a storage room, sports hall, and cinema, and has been serving Protestants since 1953.
- The wayside chapel in Hof is a station of the annual Weingarten Blood Procession.

=== Regular Events ===
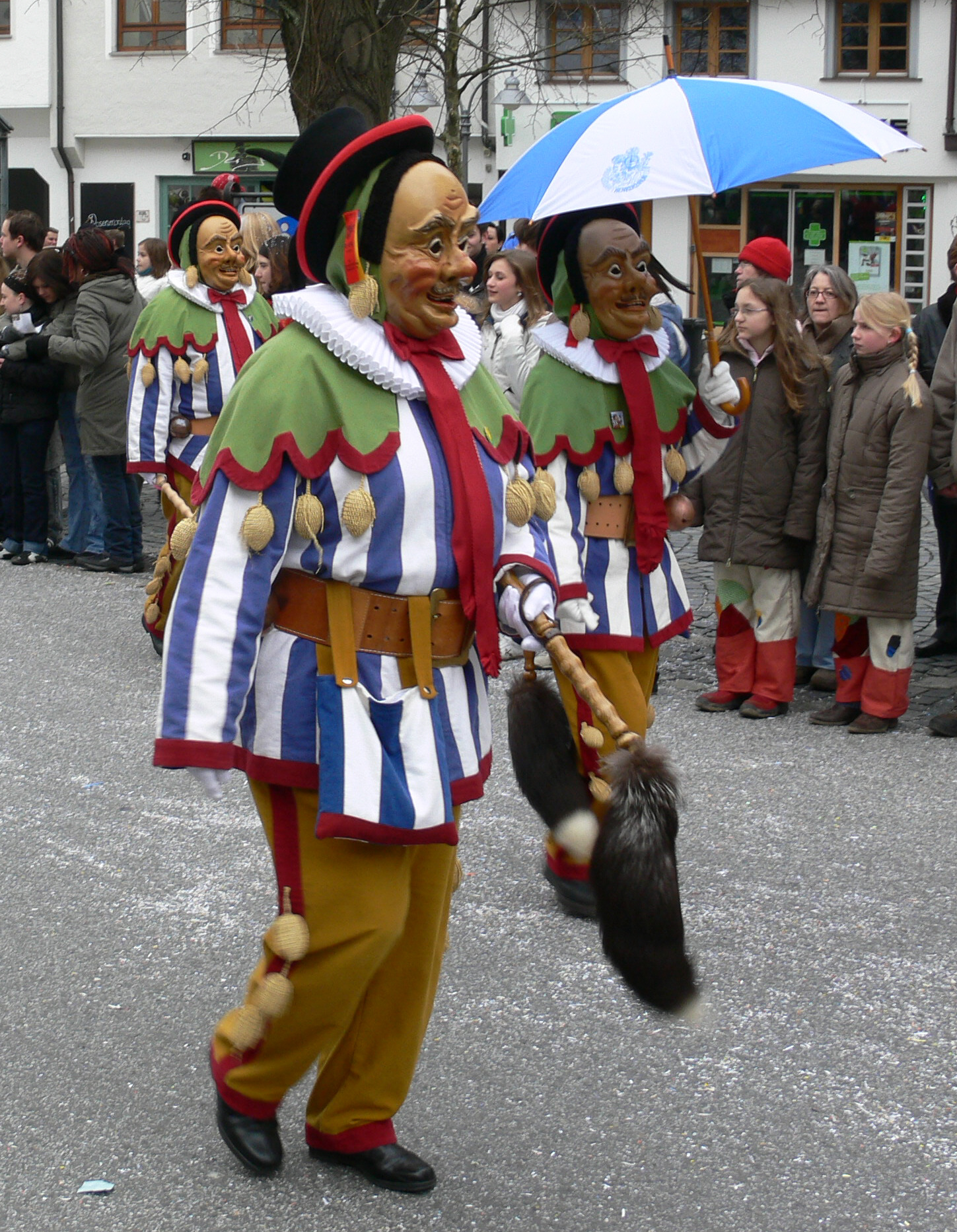
"Kardelhannes" of the Narrenzunft Henkerhaus

- The enthusiasm of the people of Baienfurt for the Swabian-Alemannic Fasnet carnival since the beginning of the 20th century is likely influenced by the nearby carnival strongholds of Bad Waldsee and Weingarten. On Fasnet Saturday, a carnival parade takes place in Baienfurt. The flower and bird masks of the Baienfurt carnival guild "Henkerhaus", founded in 1936, were recreated after World War II. For the guild's 60th anniversary in 1996, another historical Fasnet figure, "Kardelhannes," was created. Since 2004, it has been a member of the Union of Swabian-Alemannic Carnival Guilds. The guild was named after the historic executioner's house of the Imperial Abbey of Weingarten. When the Swabian district pawned the High Court jurisdiction over Baienfurt to the Abbot of Weingarten for a loan for twenty years in the late 17th century, he built a gallows and a generous residential house for the executioner. Already in 1705, the executioner moved back to the settlement of Altdorf below the Weingarten monastery, and monastery servants moved into the executioner's house - hence the location is still called "Knechtehaus" today. The house itself fell victim to a fire in 1972.
- The Weingarten Blood Procession, a procession of riders with nearly 3000 horses on the day after Ascension Day, also passes through Baienfurt.
- Marketplace festival, annually in July.

== Economy and Infrastructure ==
In addition to a few agricultural enterprises (with permanent grassland, arable land, and fruit growing) and forestry (about 20% of the municipal area is forested), the area is largely characterized by industry, crafts, and trade. Particularly noteworthy is Kiesel GmbH, an internationally operating provider of construction machinery.

As early as the 13th century, three mills were operated on the Wolfegger Aach. In the 19th century, the river was the basis for the establishment of a paper mill. It belonged to the Feldmühle Group from 1968-1990, and was then sold to the Finnish-Swedish Stora Enso Group. At the end of 2008, the group completely closed the Baienfurt plant except for a cutting center.As early as the 13th century, three mills were operated on the Wolfegger Aach. In the 19th century, the river was the basis for the establishment of a paper mill. It belonged to the Feldmühle Group from 1968-1990, and was then sold to the Finnish-Swedish Stora Enso Group. At the end of 2008, the group completely closed the Baienfurt plant except for a cutting center. An industrial and commercial park was established on the site in 2016.

Towards the end of the 19th century, a cigar factory and an iron and metal foundry were also established.

=== Transportation ===
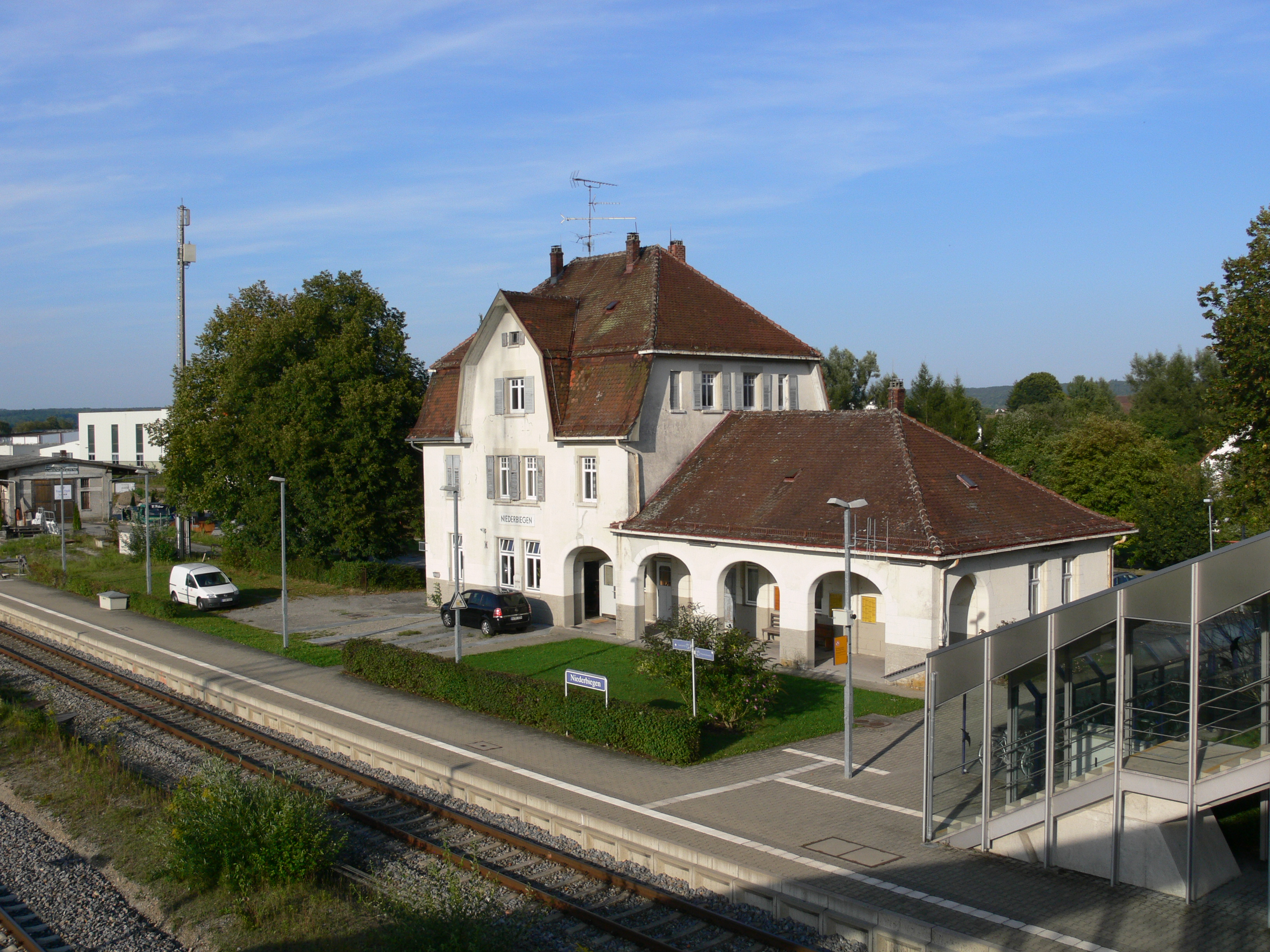
Niederbiegen train stop with reception building.

- Baienfurt is located on Federal Highway 30, which leads from Ulm to Friedrichshafen.
- In the district of Niederbiegen, there is a stop on the Ulm–Friedrichshafen railway line (Südbahn), which is served by regional trains of the Bodensee-Oberschwaben-Bahn. In Niederbiegen, the Niederbiegen–Weingarten railway line branched off from the Südbahn, from which the Baienfurt West–Baienfurt Gbf. railway line branched off, which was finally decommissioned in 2015 and dismantled in 2023.
- The municipality is connected by several bus routes to Bad Waldsee, Weingarten, and Ravensburg, among others. It is part of the Bodensee-Oberschwaben Transport Association (bodo).
- In 1911, a 2.4 km extension of the electric tramway Ravensburg–Weingarten–Baienfurt (opened in 1888, 4.2 km long, gauge 1000 mm) was opened to Baienfurt. On 23 February 1959, the Ravensburg–Weingarten route was shut down, followed by the remaining section from Weingarten to Baienfurt in June 1959.

=== Education ===
Since 2013, Baienfurt has had the Achtalschule, a comprehensive school (previously an elementary and secondary school with a technical school). For the youngest children, there are two municipal, two Roman Catholic, and one Protestant kindergarten. Additionally, there is a branch of the Ravensburg-Weingarten Adult Education Center in the town.

== Sister cities ==
- Brest, Belarus
- Martonvásár, Hungary
- Goito, Italy
- Pirna, Germany
- Remscheid, Germany

== See also ==
- Ravensburg–Weingarten–Baienfurt tram line
