= CHG-Meridian =

German technology service company

CHG-MERIDIAN AG
- Type: private (AG)
- Industry: financial services
- Founded: 1979; 47 years ago
- Founder: Jürgen Gelf
- Headquarters: Weingarten, Baden-Württemberg, Germany
- Area served: worldwide
- Key people: Mathias Wagner (Chairman of the Board of Management); Jürgen Mossakowski (Chairman of the Supervisory Board)
- Services: technology leasing and management
- Total assets: ▲€12.59 billion (2025)
- Total equity: ▲€975 million (2025)
- Number of employees: ▲1,700 (2025)
- Website: www.chg-meridian.com

CHG-Meridian (spelled in capital letters) is a technology service company based in Weingarten, Baden-Württemberg, Germany. It specializes in leasing and managing industrial assets for large companies, small and medium-sized enterprises, and public sector clients. Founded in 1979 by Jürgen Gelf, initially as a trading company for computers, CHG-Meridian developed into an international leasing company. The company has several branches in Germany, and subsidiaries in more than 30 countries.

== History ==
In 1979 Jürgen Gelf set up his own business in his home office in Berg near Ravensburg/Weingarten, Germany, brokering and selling large computers to second users. Leasing out IT systems became the focus of his business. In addition to the provision of terminal equipment, the company helped its customers to manage the corresponding infrastructure, for example, to avoid unnecessary multiple purchases of peripheral equipment and software packages.

In the 1990s, CHG underwent significant restructuring to create a basis for the acquisition of several competitors. As a result, the owners converted the company into a public limited company (Aktiengesellschaft) under the name CHG-Meridian. Jürgen Gelf, who had already retired from the operating business in 1992, headed the supervisory board. In 2003 CHG-Meridian opened its new headquarters in Weingarten, where the company is still based today. While the company invested in the processing of leasing returns, the portfolio in information technology was expanded to include industrial equipment and medical technology in 2004.

The internationalization became more and more important for CHG-Meridian in the 2000s. Branches were established in many European countries, as well as Russia, for example. An important step was the acquisition of a majority stake in El Camino Resources International, a leasing company based in Canada, Mexico, and the United States, in 2009. This enabled CHG-Meridian to become a global player in technology services. As a result, in 2014, the company broke the billion-euro barrier terms of new investment volume.

Jürgen Gelf, founder and chairman of CHG-Meridian, died in 2013. Since then, there have been various changes in the management. Despite this, the company continued its horizontal and vertical growth strategy. This again included takeovers, for example in Norway and Australia.

2022, CHG-Meridian entered the global market for device as a service with its subsidiary named devicenow. In addition, the company is co-founder and main investor of circulee, which markets used and certified IT hardware to small and medium-sized enterprises.

In 2024, CHG-MERIDIAN further expanded its international presence with the acquisition of Maia Financial's portfolio in Australia and Meridian Leasing Corporation in the United States. The company also expanded its cooperation with Japanese leasing company SMFL to include the markets in China, Malaysia, and Thailand.

In March 2026, the company established a new subsidiary in Romania and is now present in 34 countries across five continents.

== Company ==
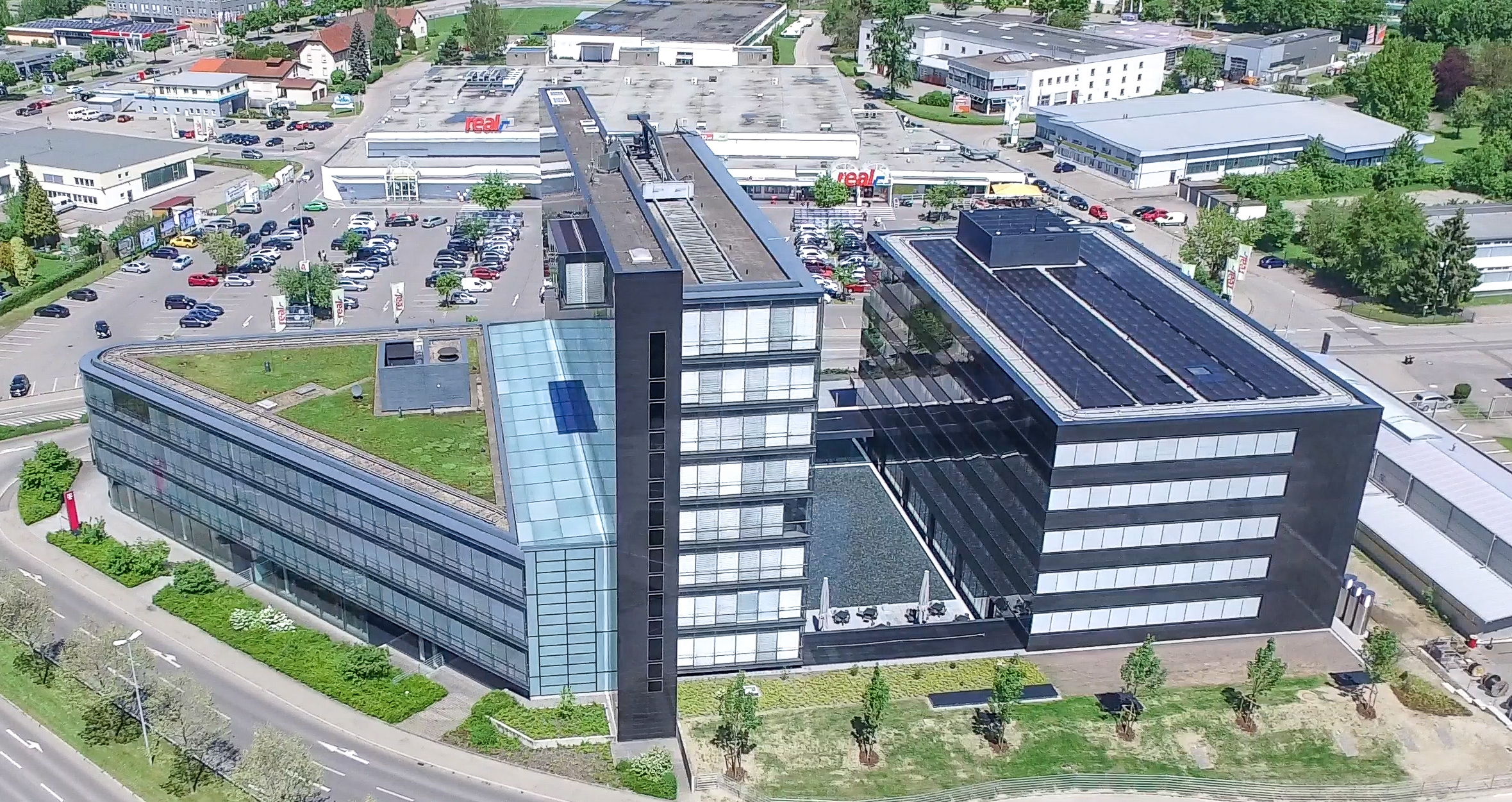
Corporate headquarters (2020)

CHG-Meridian is a stock corporation under German law. Its share capital amounts to 100 million euros. The company's business purpose is to buy, sell and lease industrial assets, in particular data processing systems and equipment, and to engage in all related businesses. The consolidated group includes 43 subsidiaries, which, together with the parent company, prepares its financial statements per HGB (German Commercial Code) and IFRS.

According to the articles of association, the management board of CHG-Meridian consists of one or more persons. Currently, Mathias Wagner (Chairman of the Board of Management), Daniel Welzer (Chief Sales Officer) and Ulrich Bergmann (Chief Financial Officer) hold management positions. The supervisory board has six members and is headed by Jürgen Mossakowski (Chairman).

== Brands ==
In addition to its core leasing business, the group operates through several brands and subsidiaries. These include the brand devicenow, which offers a Device-as-a-Service solution and provides standardized and scalable end-device services across national borders.

The Berlin-based subsidiary circulee specializes in the distribution of refurbished IT hardware for the B2B sector.

Key facts

	2017	2018	2019	2020	2021	2022	2023	2024	2025
Lease originations (€ billion)	1.243	1.511	1.995	1.758	1.727	2.23	2.45	2.83	3.12
Net income (€ million)	57.270	65.798	64.608	87.017	113.133	100.32	111.02	123.90	178.83
Net profit (€ million)	87	95	91	123	151	135.92	164.25	175.42	245.54
Managed technology portfolio (€ billion)			6.88	7.5	7.8	8.95	10.01	11,73	2.59
Number of employees	899	1,025	1,084	1,172	1,187	1,300	1,400	1,600	1,700

== Services ==
CHG-Meridian leases out information, industrial, and healthcare technology and, at the same time, offers solutions for financing and maintaining related equipment such as computers, machinery, and plant. It is managed using in-house software that significantly improves the efficiency of the technology used, for example, by booking the service costs for each property transparently. The company relies on the combination of technical and commercial data.
