= Blutritt =

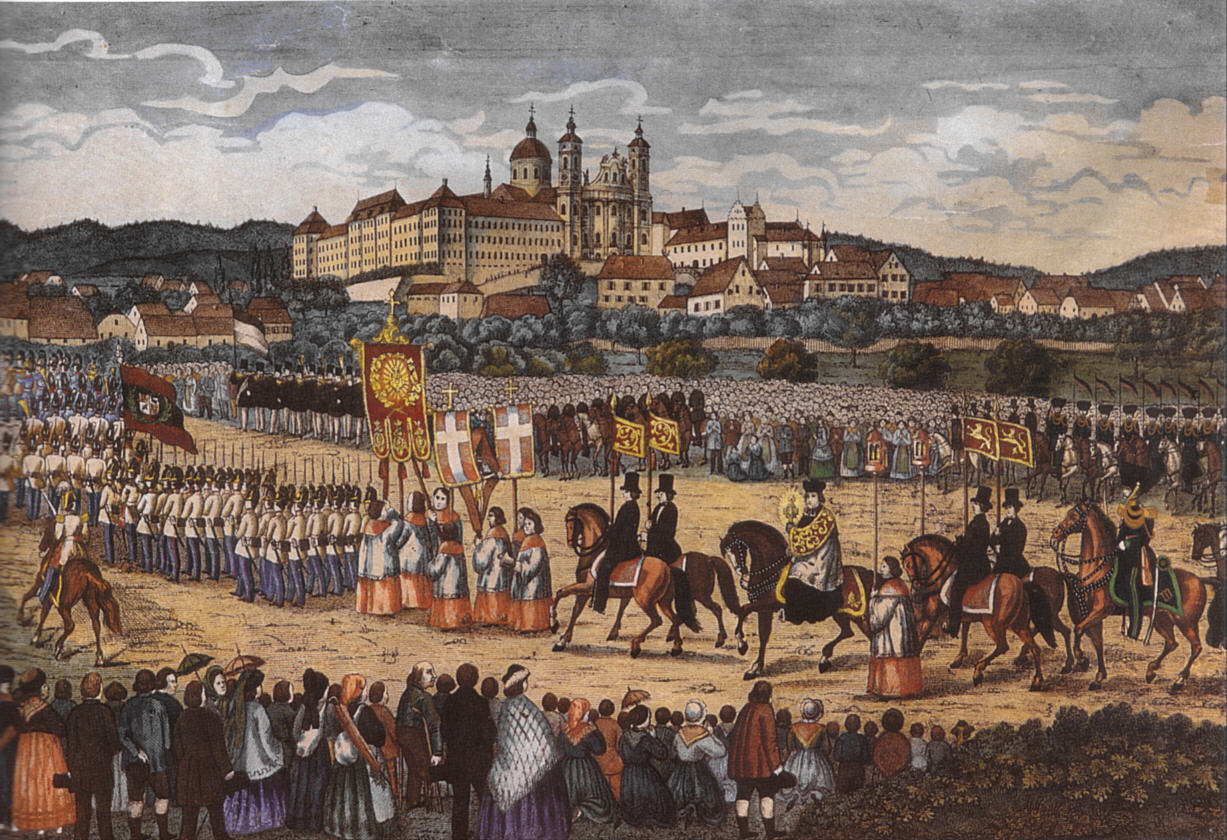
Blutritt in Weingarten, c. 1865

The Blutritt (German: [ˈbluːtˌʁɪt], literal translation: Blood Ride) is an equestrian procession in honor of a relic containing the blood of Jesus Christ. There are several cities in Germany holding Blutritte, however, the dates are not unified.

== Blutritt in Weingarten ==
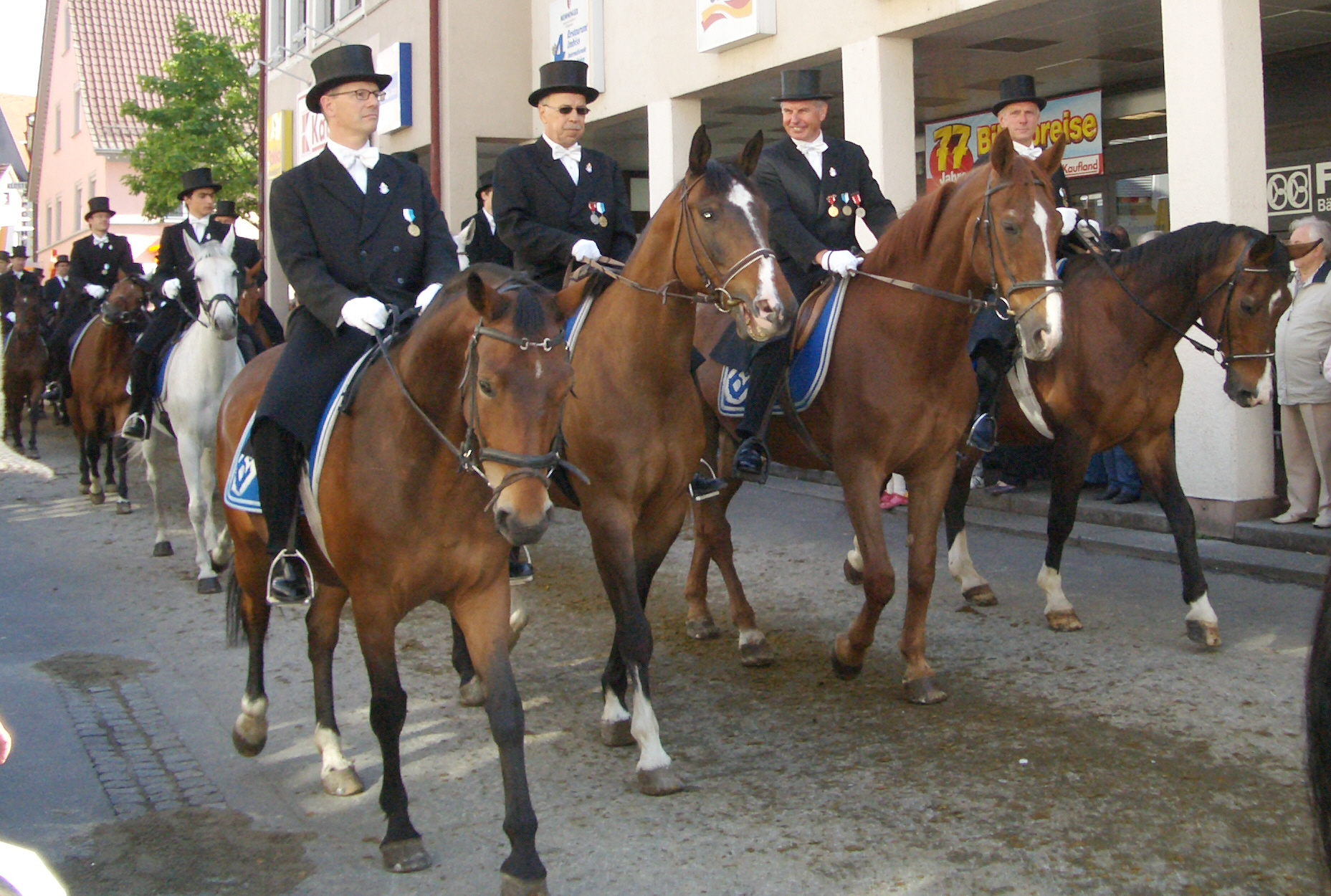
Weingarten Blutritt, 2007

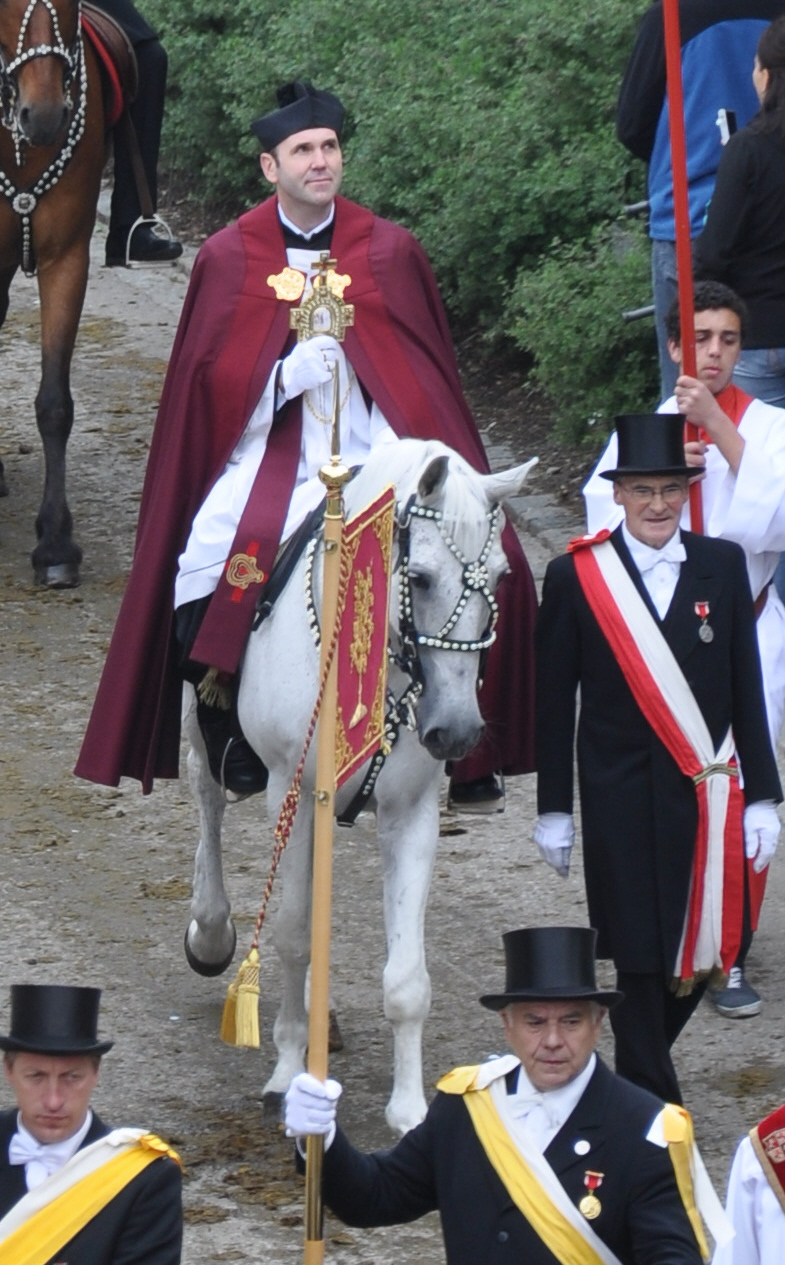
The Rider of the Holy Blood of Weingarten Blutritt, 2011

The Blutritt in the Upper Swabia Weingarten is regarded as the biggest equestrian procession in Europe. It takes place on the Friday after Ascension Day, also known as "Blood Friday" ("Blutfreitag"). In 1529 the Blutritt was first mentioned in writing, but even then it was labeled as an old custom.

The Relic of the Holy Blood is kept in the church of the Weingarten Abbey. Traditionally, the Blutritt is a pilgrimage for men.

On the day of the Blutritt, the "Rider of the Holy Blood" (German: Heilig-Blut-Reiter) carries the relic through Weingarten and the surrounding areas. Every year about 2,000 to 3,000 horsemen dressed in tailcoats and top hats (in 2016 there were 2,366 horsemen), grouped in over 100 groups of Blood Riders, escort the Rider of the Holy Blood on horseback. About 80 chapels accompany the horsemen. Every year the Blutritt in Weingarten is witnessed from the side of the road by over 30,000 pilgrims and spectators.

A "small blood Friday" is also held on the first Sunday of July, the tradition Feast of the Most Precious Blood. Despite the fact that after liturgical reforms the feast is no longer on the official calendar, many pilgrimage sites retain the customary celebration. Delegates from various rider groups gather (with their banners but without horses) for a church service followed by a social gathering.

The Weingarten Blood Friday Community was formed in 1968 to promote reverence of the Holy Blood and support and maintain the "Blutfreitag" traditions.

=== Origin ===
According to legend, the Relic of the Holy Blood in Weingarten contains the blood of Jesus of Nazareth, who was crucified in 30 or 31 AD on the hill Golgotha. A Roman legionnaire, later known as Longinus, pushed his lance deep into the side of the crucified to make sure he was dead.

The blood of Jesus Christ dripped on the face of the legionnaire and enlightened him; this was, according to the legend, the origin of the miraculous healing force of the blood of Jesus. Longinus collected some drops of the blood, mixed them with the soil of Golgotha and stored them in a lead box. After being baptized by the Apostles, he left Jerusalem and traveled on a ship to the Italian Mantua where he preached Christianity and was consequently prosecuted. In hardship and distress, he hid the casket and died as a Martyr later on. One day the place of hiding was revealed to the blind Adilbero, and the news of which reached the Emperor. The Emperor, the Pope, and the Duke of Mantua let Adilbero show them the relic's hiding place and he got his eyesight back. However, a bloody conflict broke out about the relic. As a consequence, the object of dispute was apportioned: one piece for Pope Leo IX, one for the Duke of Mantua, and a third for Emperor Henry III.

An alternate account states that the early Christian prosecution of Longinus came to an end in Cappadocia. The relic and his mortal remains were sent as a counter-present from Constantinople to the city of Mantua. When Mantua was under siege by the Lombards for one year in 580, the relic was hidden in a secret place and found again in 804. Thereupon, Pope Leo III (795-816) and Charlemagne (768-814) had it examined. The relic was disassembled.

While Mantua was under siege by the Hungarians in 923, the parts were hidden again; the greater part, together with the relics of Longinus, in the garden of the Andreas Hospital, and the smaller part in the old church of St. Paul, close to the cathedral (found in 1479). On 12 March 1048 the greater part of the Relic of the Holy Blood and the remains of Longinus were found in Mantua. Pope Leo IX (1049–1054) called a synod of the church in 1053 in Mantua and wanted to take the relic of the precious blood to Rome. Due to the opposition of the people of Mantua, a second division of the relic occurred; one piece remained in Mantua, whereas the other was taken to Rome. In 1055 Emperor Henry III (1039–1056) traveled to Mantua and got another part of the Relic of the Holy Blood.

When Emperor Henry III died in 1056, the relic was bequeathed to Baldwin V, Count of Flanders, (1035–1067) as a sign of reconciliation. He gave it as a present to his relation Judith of Flanders (1032–1094) who was married with her second husband Welf I, Duke of Bavaria. In 1094, Judith gave the Relic of the Blood to Walicho (1088–1108), abbot of Weingarten Abbey.

Apparently, it was the Friday after Ascension Day and is, thus, the origin of Blood Friday and the Ride of the Holy Blood. The handing over is depicted as a relief on the Hosanna-bell at the Basilica St. Martin.

=== History of Blutritt ===
Until the 17th century the Blutritt was connected with a border bypassing of the area of Weingarten. Therefore, the fathers marched with their sons who had just come of age and gave them a slapping in the face as a memory backing at prominent sites.

=== Procedure ===
Since 1890, as a prelude to Blutritt, after the evening Mass on Ascension Thursday, thousands of pilgrims take part in a light procession from the Basilica of St.Martin to the Kreuzberg.

The actual Blutritt starts on Blood Friday at about 7 o'clock in the morning and leads through the streets and adjacent fields of Weingarten for about ten kilometres. The relic, which is set in a cross studded with gemstones, is carried by the Rider of the Holy Blood, who bestows the Blessing of the Holy Blood (German: Segen des Heiligen Blutes) on houses, farms, and fields. The relic is secured by means of a chain with three rings, in case of the horse rearing up and throwing the rider off. Until the abbey was closed in 2010, a religious priest from the Weingarten Abbey was Rider of the Holy Blood. Since 2011, however, the parson of the basilica occupies this position. After about four hours, the reliquary is returned to the basilica.

=== Altars ===
The equestrian procession travels to four exterior altars. One of them lies outside of the district of Weingarten, in the municipality of Baienfurt:

- 1st Altar – Thumbstraße 48 in the parish of St. Maria, Weingarten
- 2nd Altar – Galgenkreuz (lit. "gallows cross", small religious monument that resembles a wayside cross or wayside shrine; similar in meaning to a conciliation cross, though more specifically relating to an execution site) at the street to Ettishofen in the parish of Heilig Geist, Weingarten
- 3rd Altar – farm at the street after Mochenwangen in the parish of Baienfurt
- 4th Altar – Baienfurter Straße at the missionary cross in the parish of St. Martin, Weingarten

=== Movie: Die Blutritter ===
In 2003, film director Douglas Wolfsperger made a documentary about several participants of the Blutritt in Weingarten. It is called "Die Blutritter" ("The Riders of the Holy Blood") and premiered at the Locarno Festival in the summer of 2004.

== Blutritt in Bad Wurzach ==
In the upper swabian city of Bad Wurzach, the Blutritt is traditionally part of the Festival of the Holy Blood, which takes place on the second Friday of July. With around 1,500 riders and about 5,000 pilgrims, it is the second largest mounted procession in Middle Europe. The object of worship is a relic from the private possessions of Pope Innocent XII.

=== Origin ===
Tradition has it that in Rome, a pilgrim received a piece of cloth drenched in blood from Pope Innocent XII in the year of 1693. This relic then ended up in Bad Wurzach.

=== Procedure ===
The blood-soaked cloth is carried around the city and its surroundings in a gilded reliquary. The horses are festively decorated, and the riders are wearing formal attire. The procession starts at 7 o'clock with the collection of the relic at the town church, and ends with a sermon on top of the Gottesberg (German: God's hill).

==== Processional route ====
- Collection of the relic in the church St. Verena
- 1st Altar at the gate of the castle
- 2nd Altar at Josenhof
- 3rd Altar in Truschwende
- 4th Altar in Reinstein
- Destination: Gottesberg

== Blutritt in other locations ==
- Neuler
- Schwenningen
- Westhausen (Ostalb)
- Weissenau

In some Lucerne municipalities, there are similar traditions taking place on Ascension Day (In Swiss German this holiday is called: Auffahrt or Uffahrt, meaning ascension).

- Beromünster
- Hitzkirch
- Sempach
