= Mittleres Schussental =

- Gemeindeverwaltungsverband
- Location of Mittleres Schussental within Ravensburg district
- Interactive map of Mittleres Schussental
- Location within Germany Location within Baden-Württemberg
- Coordinates: 47°47′N 9°37′E
- Country: Germany
- State: Baden-Württemberg
- Admin. region: Tübingen
- District: Ravensburg
- Seat: Ravensburg
- Subdivisions: 5 municipalities

Area
  - Total: 171.71 km^{2} (66.30 sq mi)

Population (2025-12-31)
  - Total: 92,610
  - Density: 539.3/km^{2} (1,397/sq mi)
- Time zone: UTC+01:00 (CET)
  - Summer (DST): UTC+02:00 (CEST)
- Website: gmschussental.de

Mittleres Schussental is a Gemeindeverwaltungsverband in the district of Ravensburg in Baden-Württemberg, Germany. The seat of the Gemeindeverwaltungsverband is in Ravensburg.

The Gemeindeverwaltungsverband Mittleres Schussental consists of the following municipalities:

1. Baienfurt
2. Baindt
3. Berg
4. Ravensburg
5. Weingarten
