= University of Applied Sciences Ravensburg-Weingarten =

Ravensburg-Weingarten University of Applied Sciences
- Hochschule Ravensburg-Weingarten University of Applied Science
- Motto: Potenziale entwickeln. Zukunft gestalten.
- Motto in English: Realizing potential. Shaping the future.
- Type: Public
- Established: 1964
- President: Thomas Spägele
- Students: 3,500
- Location: Weingarten, Baden-Württemberg, Germany; 47.8142°N 9.65306°E
- Website: www.rwu.de/en

Ravensburg-Weingarten University of Applied Sciences (RWU; German: Hochschule Ravensburg-Weingarten) is a public university in the city of Weingarten, in the southern part of the German state of Baden-Württemberg. The university was founded in 1962 and tracks advanced fields in Applied Physics and Process Engineering, Electrical Engineering and Computer Science, Automotive and Mechatronics Engineering, Mechanical Engineering and Business & Technology Management as well as Social Work and Healthcare Management. The university has a very good reputation regarding engineering and technology studies; according to CHE ranking, published weekly by major German newspaper Die Zeit, RWU frequently ranks among the top universities in the fields of mechanical and electrical engineering, as well as computer science.

== History ==
In 1962, Baden-Wuerttemberg Parliament decided to build a State School of Engineering (SIS) in Ravensburg with two departments, Mechanical Engineering and Physical Engineering. In 1967, the first students subsequently graduated as engineers. In 1971, The State Schools of Engineering become Fachhochschulen, commonly known as Universities of Applied Sciences English. In 1974, the Ministry of Education decided the establishment of two new faculties: Electronics and Business Administration. The university was further extended with the introduction of the Electronics program as part of the Physical Engineering department in May 1974.

Today, Ravensburg-Weingarten University offers 35 undergraduate and graduate degree programs in German and English in four faculties: The Faculty of Electrical Engineering and Computer Science, the Faculty of Mechanical Engineering, the Faculty of Technology and Management and the Faculty of Social Work, Health and Nursing. RWU employs 296 academic and administrative staff members.

=== PLUS studies ===
In cooperation with the near Weingarten University of Education which specializes in teachers' education, the university provides some courses leading to a double graduation with a bachelor's degree in Engineering and an additionally possibility to obtain a university degree in Teaching at professional schools.

== Structure ==
The university is divided into several faculties which provide a broad range of Engineering, Social Work and Management courses:

- Faculty of Electrical Engineering and Computer Science
- Faculty of Mechanical Engineering
- Faculty of Social Work and Healthcare Management
- Faculty of Technology and Management
