= Scherzach =

River in Germany

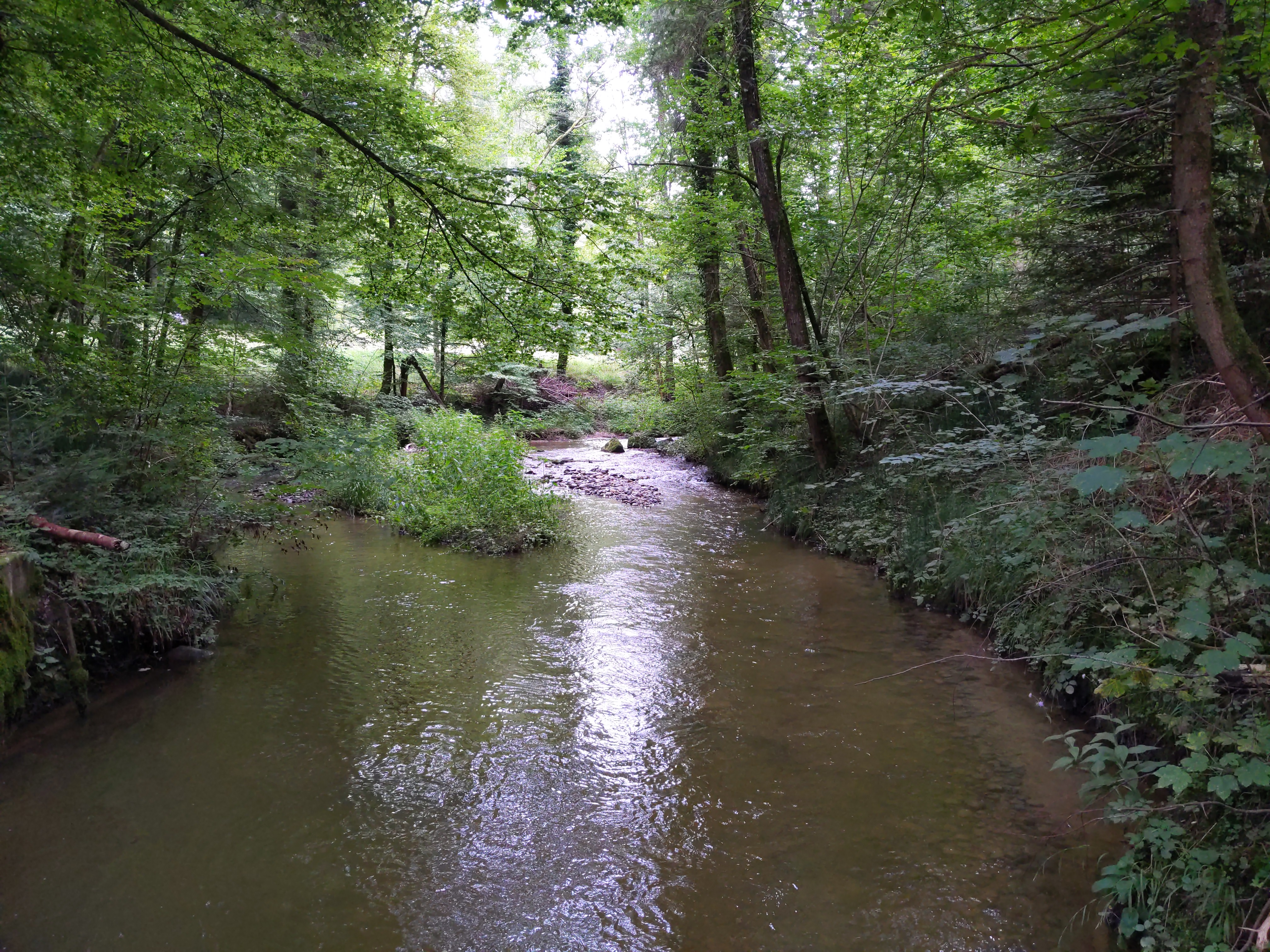

Location
- Country: Germany
- State: Baden-Württemberg

Physical characteristics
- Mouth
  - location: Schussen
  - coordinates: 47.8043°N 9.6088°E
- Length: 13.2 km (8.2 mi)

Basin features
- Progression: Schussen→ Rhine→ North Sea

Scherzach is a river of Baden-Württemberg, Germany. It flows into the Schussen near Ravensburg.

== See also ==
- List of rivers of Baden-Württemberg
