= Schussen =

River in Germany

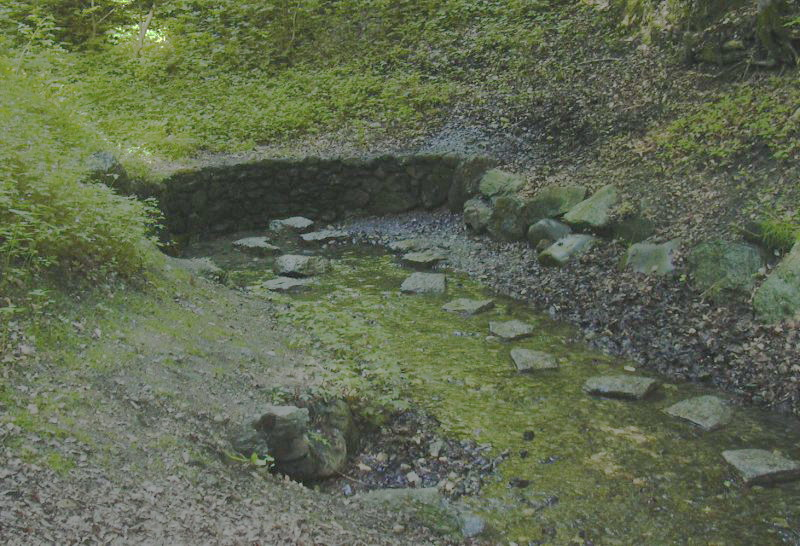
- Source of the Schussen River

- Location of the mouth of the river in Baden-Württemberg

Location
- Country: Germany
- State: Baden-Württemberg
- Cities: Bad Schussenried; Aulendorf; Weingarten; Ravensburg; Meckenbeuren; Eriskirch

Physical characteristics
- Source
  - location: north of Bad Schussenried, Baden-Württemberg, Germany
  - coordinates: 48°1′19″N 9°39′29″E
  - elevation: 585 m (1,919 ft)
- Mouth: Eriskircher wetlands
  - location: Eriskirch in the Bodensee
  - coordinates: 47°36′26.2″N 9°31′37.8″E
  - elevation: 395 m (1,296 ft)
- Length: 59.3 km (36.8 mi)
- Basin size: 822 km^{2} (317 sq mi)

Basin features
- Progression: Lake Constance→ Rhine→ North Sea

The Schussen (German pronunciation: [ˈʃʊsn̩]) is a 59-kilometre-long (37 mi) tributary of Lake Constance (Bodensee), which drains to the High Rhine, in the southern portion of Upper Swabia in Baden-Württemberg (Germany).

== Course ==
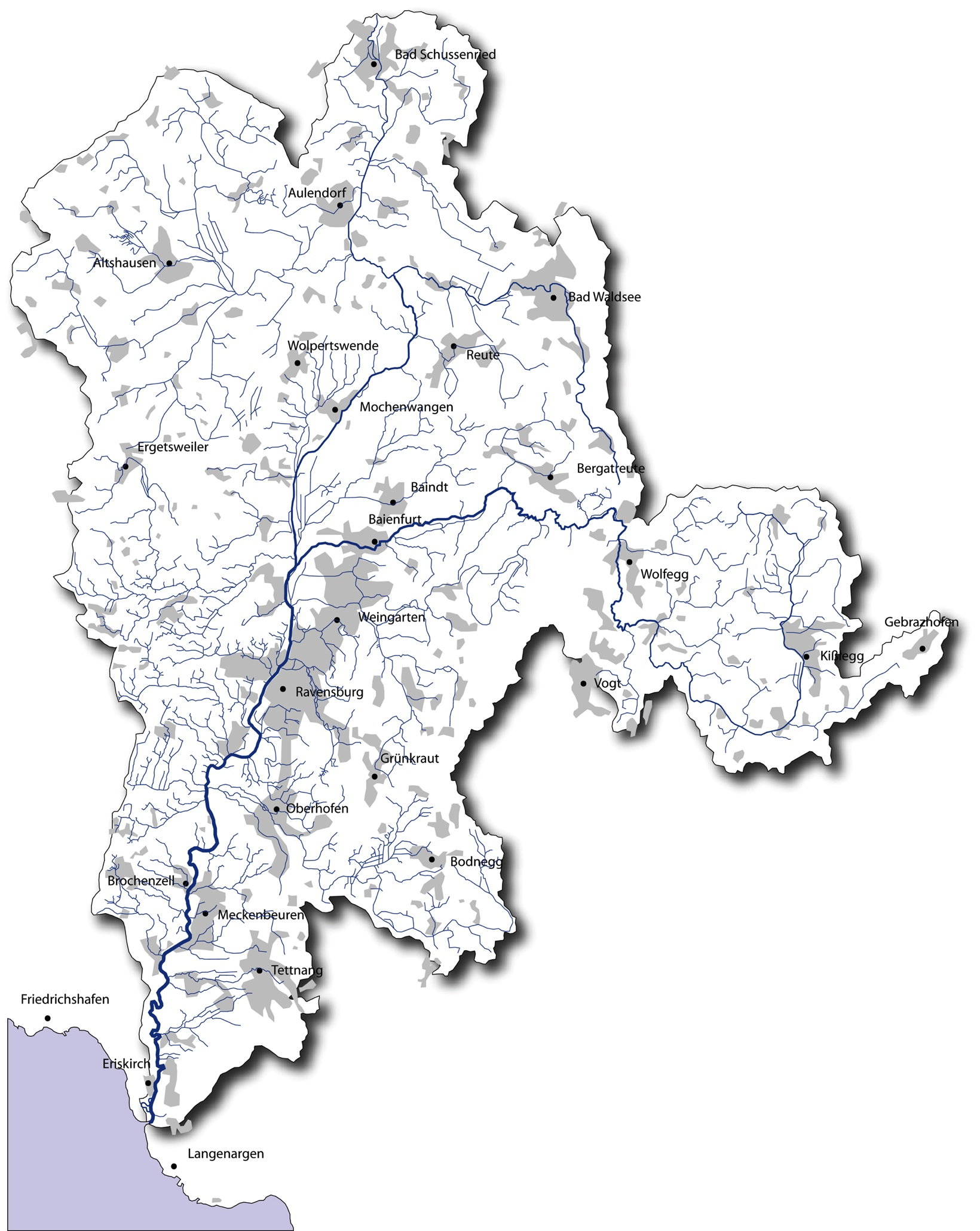
Drainage basin of river Schussen

From its source, not far from the Lake Feder, around 1.5 km (0.93 mi) north of Bad Schussenried, where it runs down the watershed between the Rhine and the Danube, to the Bodensee.

The river passes south of Aulendorf through its own valley in the northern part of the Altdorf Forests, through the Schussen ravine by Durlesbach and by Mochewangen (Wolpertswende), and from there into the broad Schussen Valley. The valley was not created by the river itself, but rather during one of the Ice Ages. From there it runs past the small city of Weingarten, and, further, by Ravensburg and through the district of Meckenbeuren, before it flows out into Upper Lake Constance (Obersee) in the vicinity of Eriskirch, at the Eriskircher wetlands.

== Tributaries ==
Several streams enter the Schussen, including the Wolfegger Ach, which originates between Binningen and Niederbiegen (both are part of the community of Baienfurt). Other tributaries include the Scherzach, Scharzach, and the Ravensburg city creek.

== Oddities ==
In the course of its passage through the County of Biberach, the Schussen is the only stream that flows south to the Bodensee; all others flow north to the Danube.

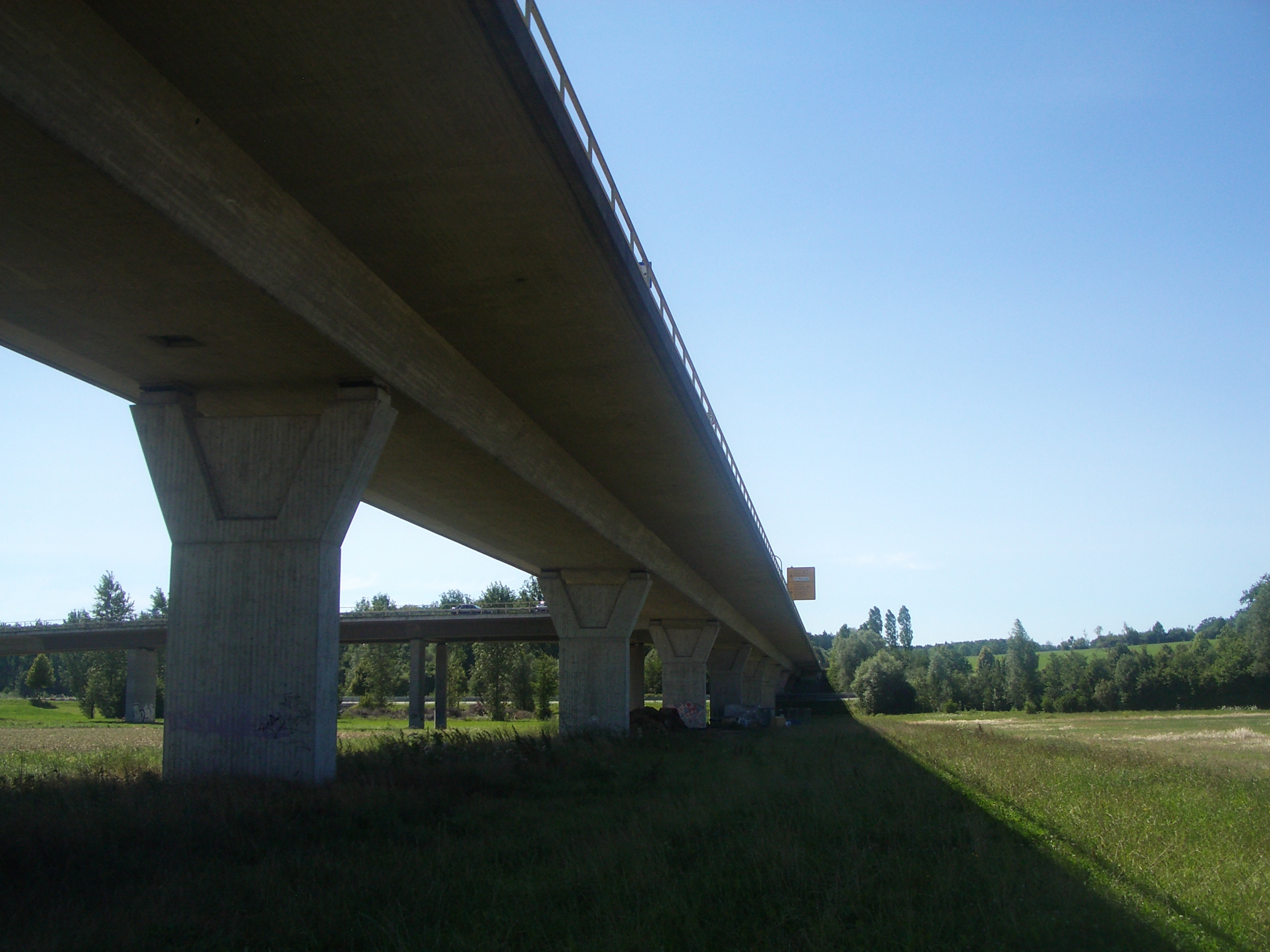
"Schussenbridge", Ravensburg

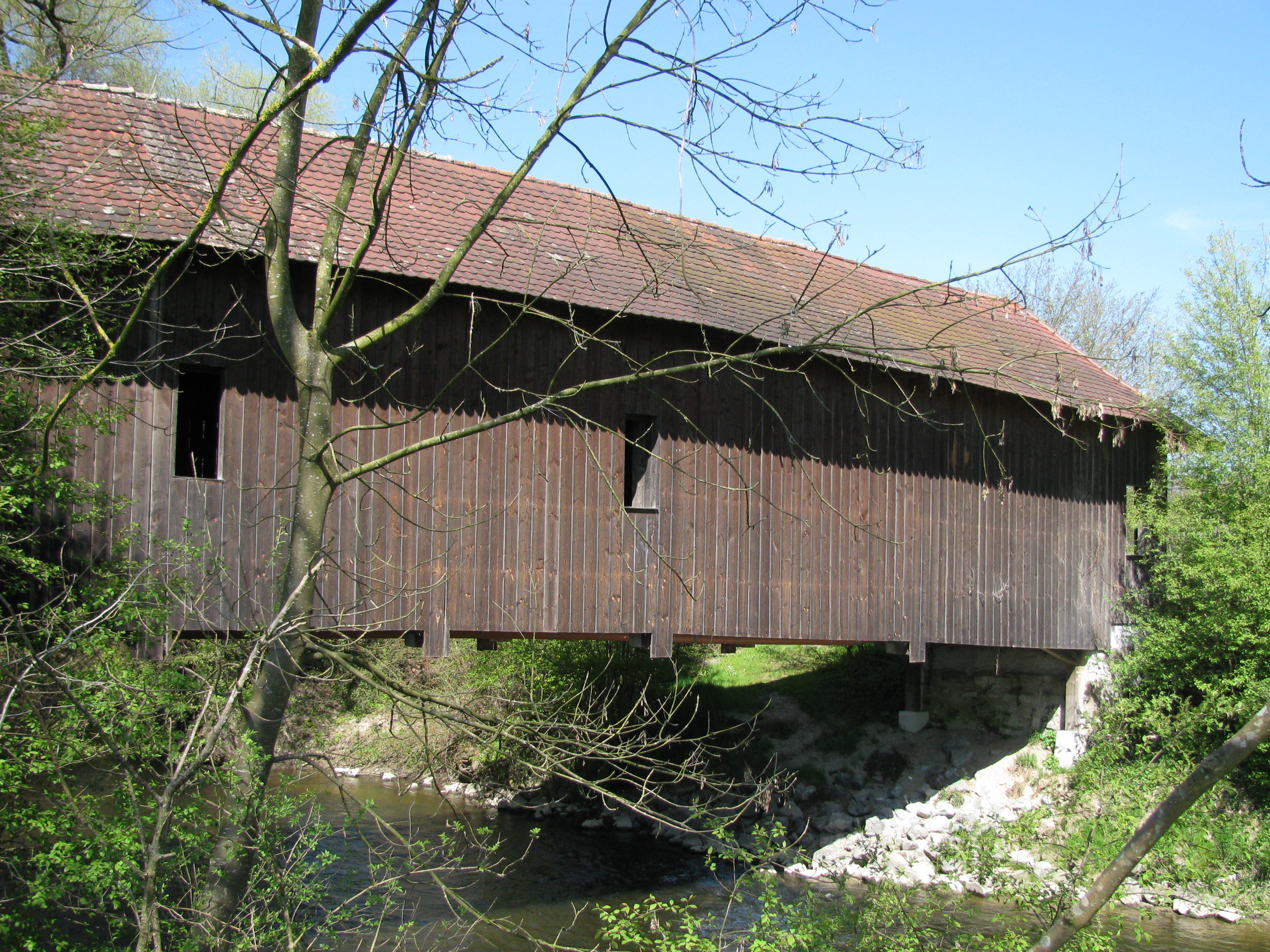
Bridge of 1824, Baumgarten

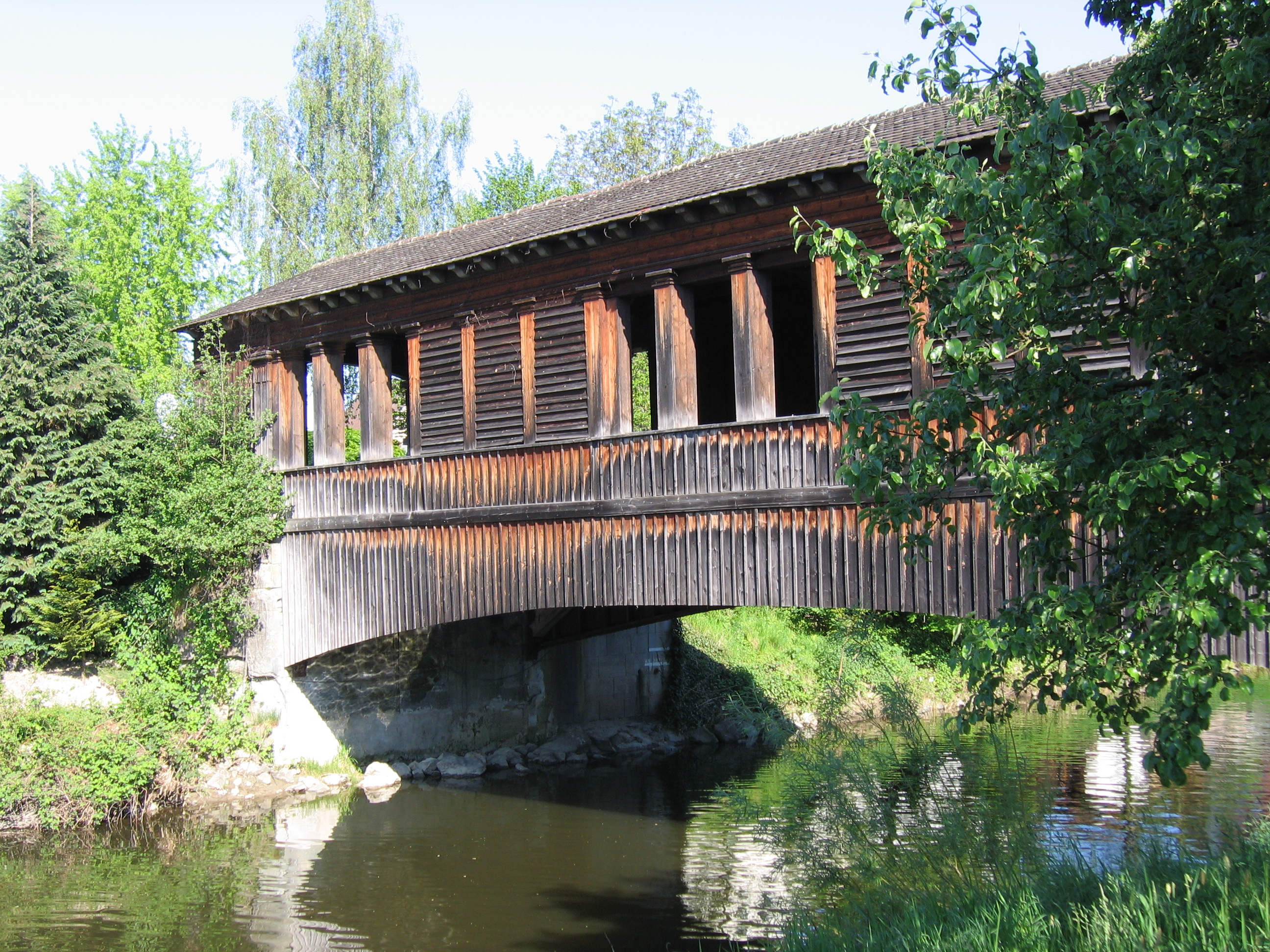
Bridge of 1828, Eriskirch

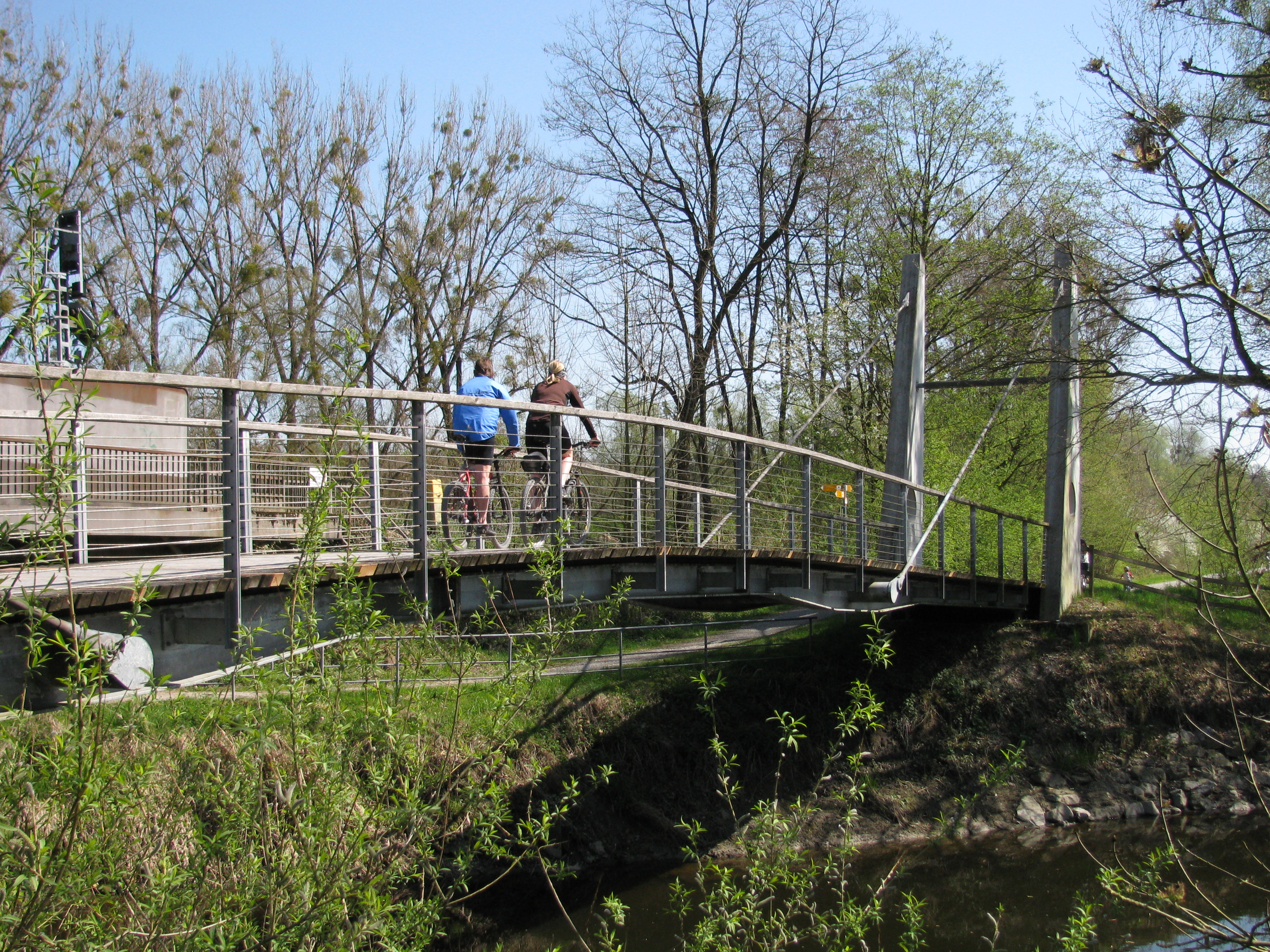
Close to Lake Constance

== See also ==
- List of rivers of Germany
  - List of rivers of Baden-Württemberg
