= Wolfegger Ach =

River in Germany

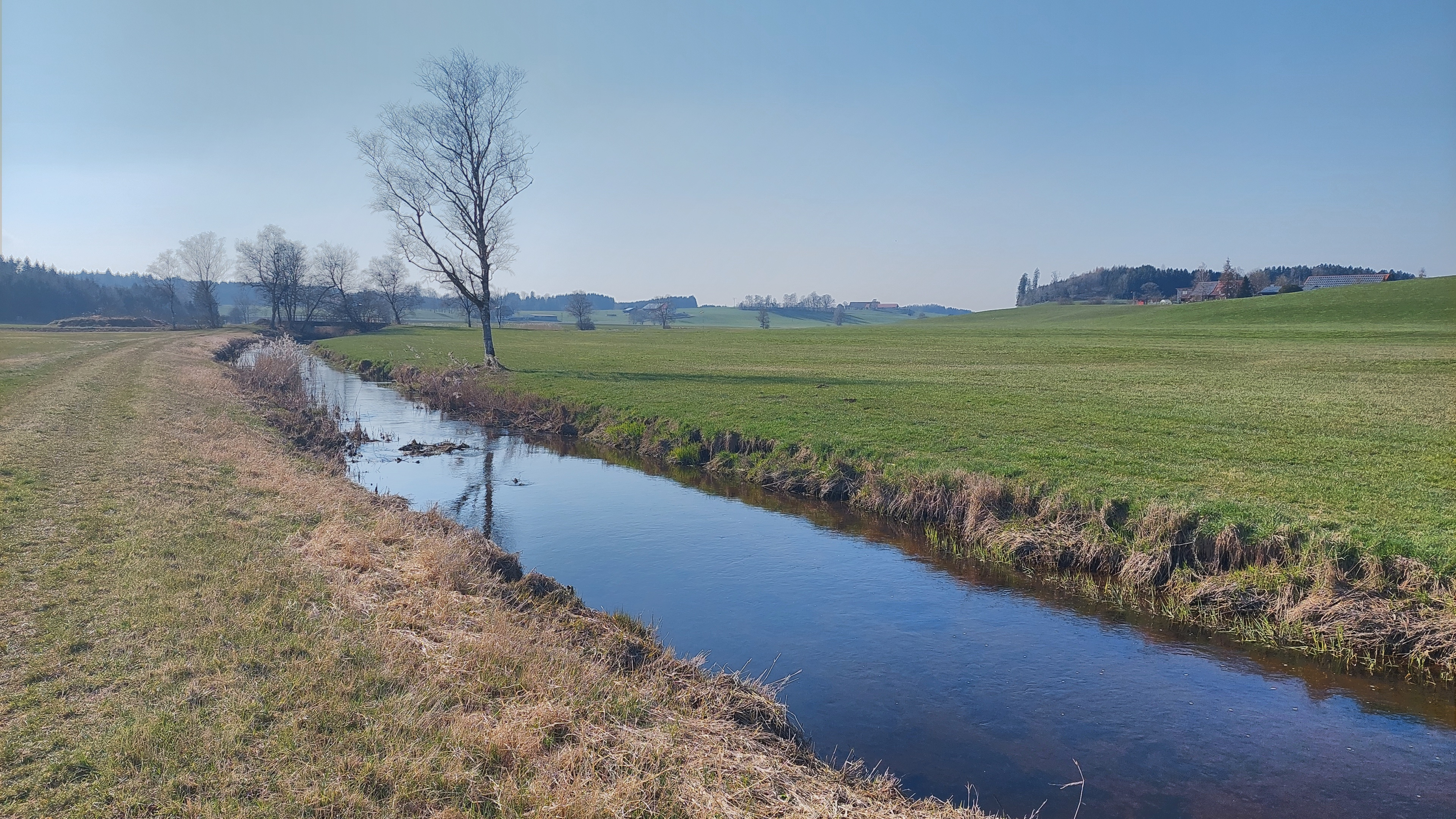

Location
- Country: Germany
- State: Baden-Württemberg

Physical characteristics
- Mouth
  - location: Schussen
  - coordinates: 47.8198°N 9.6111°E
- Length: 50.0 km (31.1 mi)
- Basin size: 166 km^{2} (64 sq mi)

Basin features
- Progression: Schussen→ Rhine→ North Sea

Wolfegger Ach is a river of Baden-Württemberg, Germany. It passes through Wolfegg and flows into the Schussen near Weingarten.

== See also ==
- List of rivers of Baden-Württemberg
