= Berg, Baden-Württemberg =

Berg
- Municipality
- Coat of arms

- Location of Berg within Ravensburg district
- Interactive map of Berg
- Location within Germany Location within Baden-Württemberg
- Coordinates: 47°48′43″N 09°36′01″E
- Country: Germany
- State: Baden-Württemberg
- Admin. region: Tübingen
- District: Ravensburg
- Municipal assoc.: Mittleres Schussental

Government
  - Mayor (2019–27): Manuela Hugger

Area
  - Total: 28.42 km^{2} (10.97 sq mi)
- Elevation: 515 m (1,690 ft)

Population (2025-12-31)
  - Total: 4,353
  - Density: 153.2/km^{2} (396.7/sq mi)
- Time zone: UTC+01:00 (CET)
  - Summer (DST): UTC+02:00 (CEST)
- Postal codes: 88276
- Dialling codes: 0751
- Vehicle registration: RV
- Website: www.berg-schussental.de

Berg (German pronunciation: [bɛʁk]) is a municipality in the district of Ravensburg in Baden-Württemberg in Germany.
