= Baindt =

- Municipality
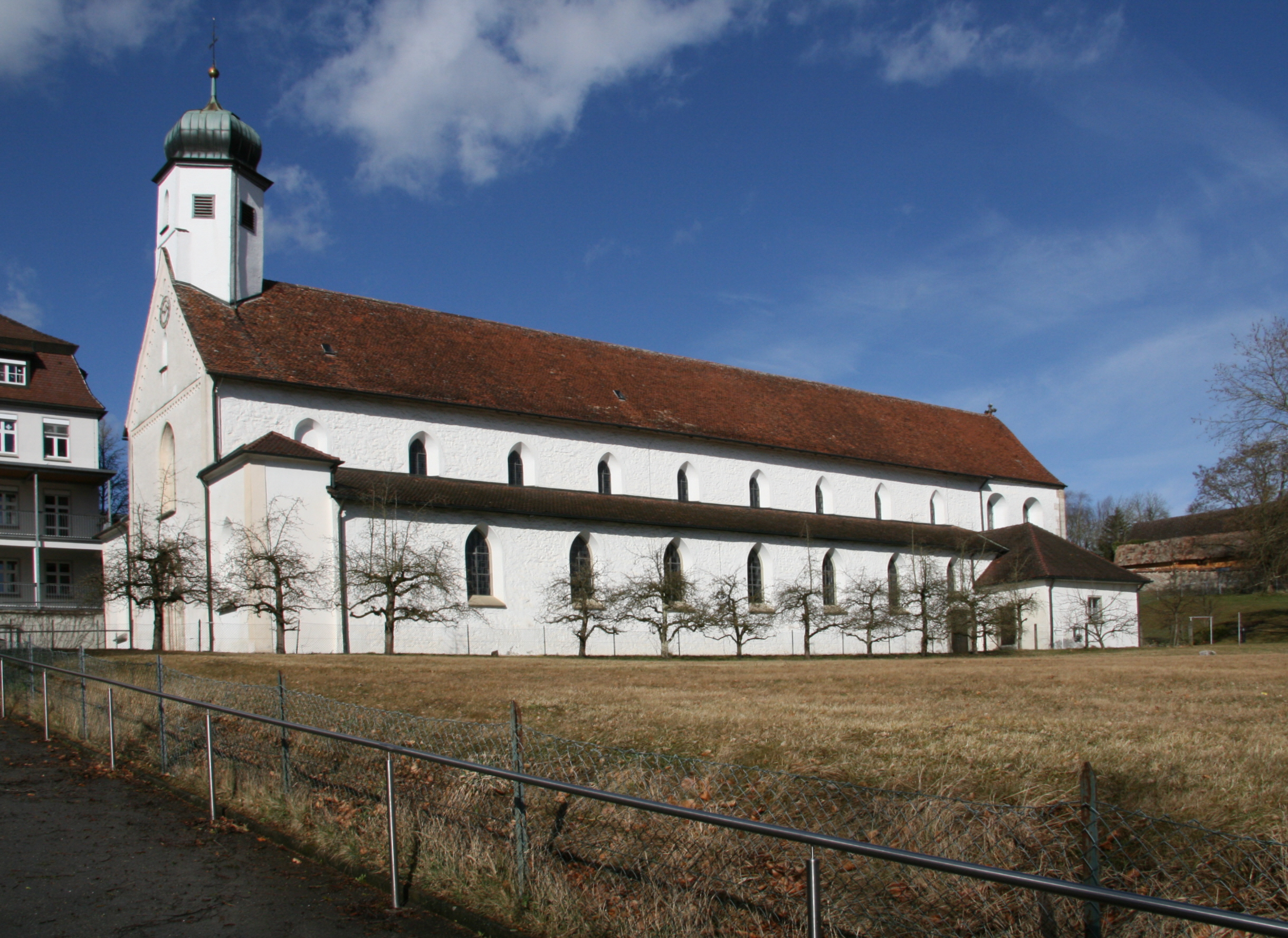
- Church of Saint John the Baptist

- Coat of arms

- Location of Baindt within Ravensburg district
- Interactive map of Baindt
- Location within Germany Location within Baden-Württemberg
- Coordinates: 47°50′29″N 09°39′43″E
- Country: Germany
- State: Baden-Württemberg
- Admin. region: Tübingen
- District: Ravensburg
- Municipal assoc.: Mittleres Schussental

Government
  - Mayor (2018–26): Simone Rürup

Area
  - Total: 23.07 km^{2} (8.91 sq mi)
- Elevation: 483 m (1,585 ft)

Population (2025-12-31)
  - Total: 5,271
  - Density: 228.5/km^{2} (591.8/sq mi)
- Time zone: UTC+01:00 (CET)
  - Summer (DST): UTC+02:00 (CEST)
- Postal codes: 88255
- Dialling codes: 07502
- Vehicle registration: RV
- Website: www.baindt.de

Baindt is a municipality in the district of Ravensburg in Baden-Württemberg in Germany. It was home to Baindt Abbey which ruled a secular principality in the Holy Roman Empire.

== Sister cities ==
- Brest, Belarus
