= Weingarten, Württemberg =

Weingarten
- Town
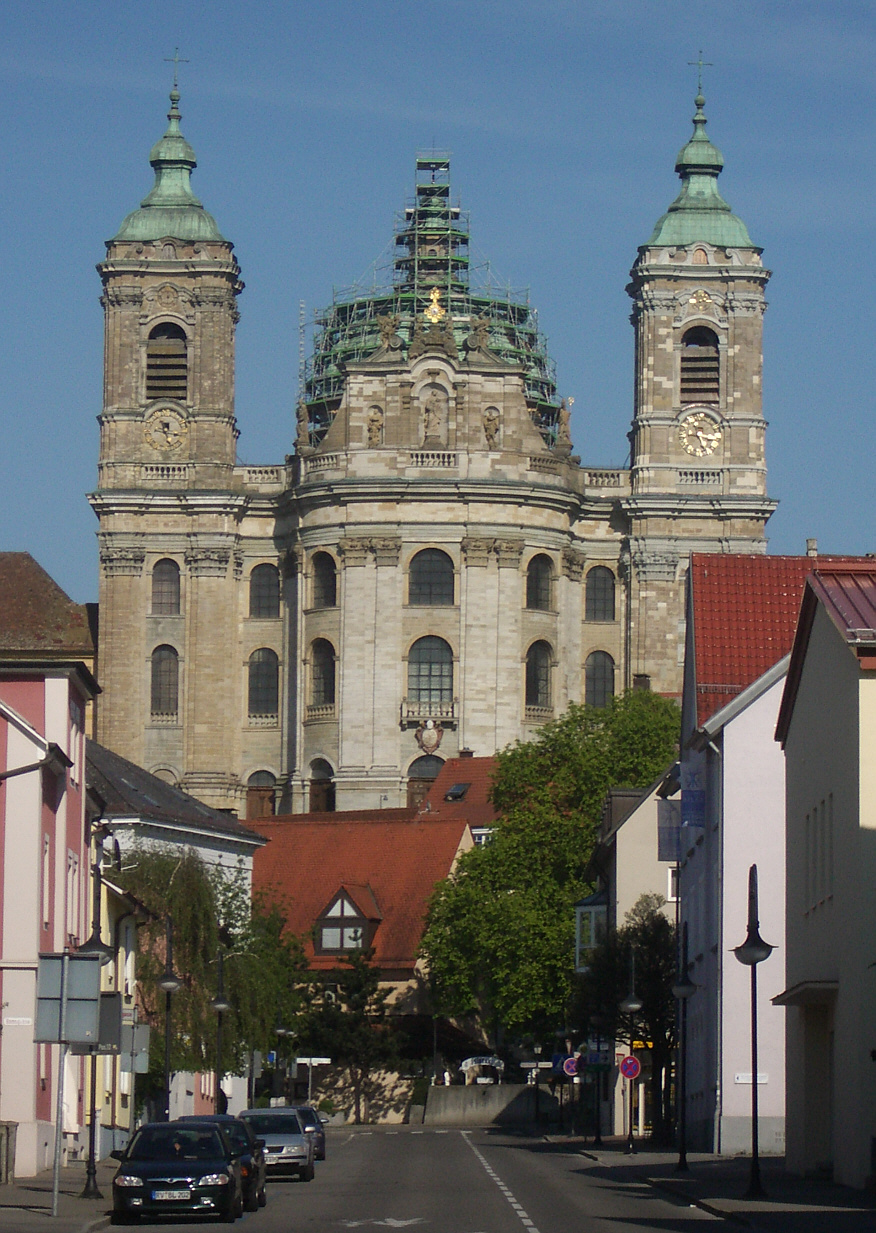
- Basilica of Saints Martin and Oswald

- Coat of arms

- Location of Weingarten within Ravensburg district
- Interactive map of Weingarten
- Location within Germany Location within Baden-Württemberg
- Coordinates: 47°48′33″N 09°38′40″E
- Country: Germany
- State: Baden-Württemberg
- Admin. region: Tübingen
- District: Ravensburg
- Municipal assoc.: Mittleres Schussental

Government
  - Mayor (2022–30): Clemens Moll (Ind.)

Area
  - Total: 12.16 km^{2} (4.70 sq mi)
- Elevation: 485 m (1,591 ft)

Population (2025-12-31)
  - Total: 25,034
  - Density: 2,059/km^{2} (5,332/sq mi)
- Time zone: UTC+01:00 (CET)
  - Summer (DST): UTC+02:00 (CEST)
- Postal codes: 88250
- Dialling codes: 0751
- Vehicle registration: RV
- Website: www.weingarten-online.de

Weingarten (German pronunciation: [ˈvaɪnɡaʁtn̩]; Low Alemannic: Wãẽgaade; lit. 'Wine Garden') is a town with a population of 25,000 (as of 2020) in Württemberg, in the District of Ravensburg, in the valley of the Schussen River. Together with the southern neighbour cities of Ravensburg and Friedrichshafen on Lake Constance (Bodensee), it forms one of 14 medium-sized infrastructural centres in Baden-Württemberg. The town is seat of the University of Applied Sciences of Ravensburg-Weingarten (Hochschule Ravensburg-Weingarten) and of the Teachers' College of Weingarten (Pädagogische Hochschule Weingarten).

== History ==
The town was formerly known as Altdorf and was renamed to Weingarten in 1865. Before that, Weingarten was the name of Weingarten Abbey only, which lay on the Martinsberg (St. Martin's hill) above the town. The name "Altdorf" is derived from the Frankish alach for "church". So "Altdorf" does not mean "old village" but "village/thorp with the parish church".

Near the old town, an Alemannic burial place was excavated in 1954–1957, dating from the 5th century. In the 8th century the region became part of the Frankish empire. Around the 9th century the Elder Welfs became counts of the Schussengau and established their seat in Altdorf.

In 1056 Welf IV transferred the ancestral seat of the Welfs to the newly built castle of Ravensburg. He founded a new Benedictine abbey at the Martinsberg in Altdorf; this abbey was named Weingarten Abbey.

By a contract of inheritance, in 1191 the Hohenstaufen Frederick Barbarossa acquired the ownership of the Schussengau (including Altdorf, Weingarten and Ravensburg) from Welf VI, Duke of Spoleto and uncle of both Frederick Barbarossa and Henry the Lion.

About seventy years later, with the death of Conradin in Naples in 1268, the line of the Hohenstaufen became extinct. Their former estates were confiscated as imperial property of the Holy Roman Empire. While the small town of Altdorf was ruled by the Reichslandvogt (imperial steward resp. bailiff) of Swabia, the abbey of Weingarten won the status of an "Imperial Abbey" with privileges similar to those of an Imperial Free City. The Landvogtei was given in 1473/1486 as pawn to Sigismund, Archduke of Austria, which led to its integration as a district within Further Austria.

The Vogt's seat was first located at the castle of Ravensburg (most often called "Veitsburg" to distinguish it from the Imperial City of Ravensburg) until 1647 when Swedish troops destroyed the castle and the Vogt moved to a palace (the today's Schlössle) in Altdorf.

The abbey of Weingarten became one of the wealthiest monasteries in southern Germany, owning about 306 km^{2} of rich estates, before it was confiscated during the secularization following the Reichsdeputationshauptschluß bill in 1803. Weingarten was first allotted to the House of Nassau, Altdorf to the dukedom of Württemberg. In 1806 Weingarten, too, was incorporated into Württemberg.

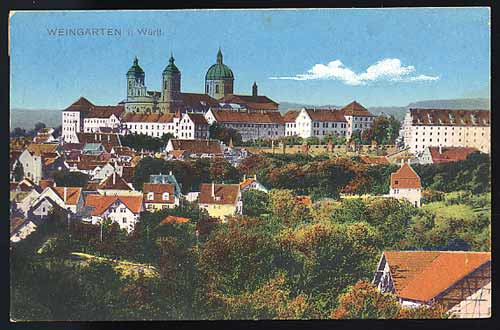
Weingarten 1917

During the 19th century several barracks were placed in Altdorf-Weingarten, making the city an important military site; following this in 1911 a young Erwin Rommel was based in the town. As in neighbouring Ravensburg, a significant engineering industry evolved during the second half of the century, based mainly on the local traditions of (paper and other) mills and textile production.

In 1922, monks from Beuron Abbey (on the Danube) and Erdington Abbey (in Birmingham) founded a new Benedictine abbey that leased some of the former abbey rooms. In 2010 the last four monks abandoned the abbey, the lease was taken over by the Catholic Diocese of Rottenburg-Stuttgart which tried to find a new monastic community to install here.

During Nazi Germany Weingarten was incorporated into Ravensburg; after the war, the rival cities were separated again.

Since 1949, most of the former abbey buildings have been occupied by a teachers' college. A smaller part of the main building is leased to the Catholic Diocese of Rottenburg-Stuttgart which runs the Catholic Academy for adult education there. New buildings were erected in the neighbourhood by the University of Applied Sciences Ravensburg-Weingarten. In 2014 parts of the Academy were rededicated as a refugees home, in 2015 rooms of the then-abandoned abbey were rededicated as auxiliary first admittance facility for refugees.

During the municipal reforms of the 1970s, a renewed attempt to fuse Ravensburg and Weingarten failed due to massive resistance on the part of Weingarten's citizenry.

Weingarten was home to the NATO International Long Range Reconnaissance Patrol School through the 1980s and 90s until it moved to Pfullendorf.

== Local council ==
Elections in May 2014:

- AfD = 1
- SPD = 4
- Alliance 90/The Greens = 5
- CDU = 7
- FW (Free voters BW) = 6
- BfW (Citizens for Weingarten) = 3
- Total 26

== Mayors and Lord Mayors ==
- 1905–1920: Josef Reich
- 1920–1937: Wilhelm Braun (1997–1971)
- 1937–1945: incorporated to Ravensburg
- 1945–1954: Wilhelm Braun
- 1954–1975: Richard Mayer (from 1974 Lord Mayor)
- 1975–1992: Rolf Gerich (1928–2013)
- 1992–2008: Gerd Gerber (born 1944)
- since 2008: Markus Ewald (born 1964)

== Twin towns – sister cities ==
Weingarten is twinned with:

- Brest, Belarus
- Bron, France
- Burgeis (Mals), Italy
- Grimma, Germany
- Mantua, Italy

Weingarten also has a climatic partnership with Blumenau in Brazil.

== Places of interest ==
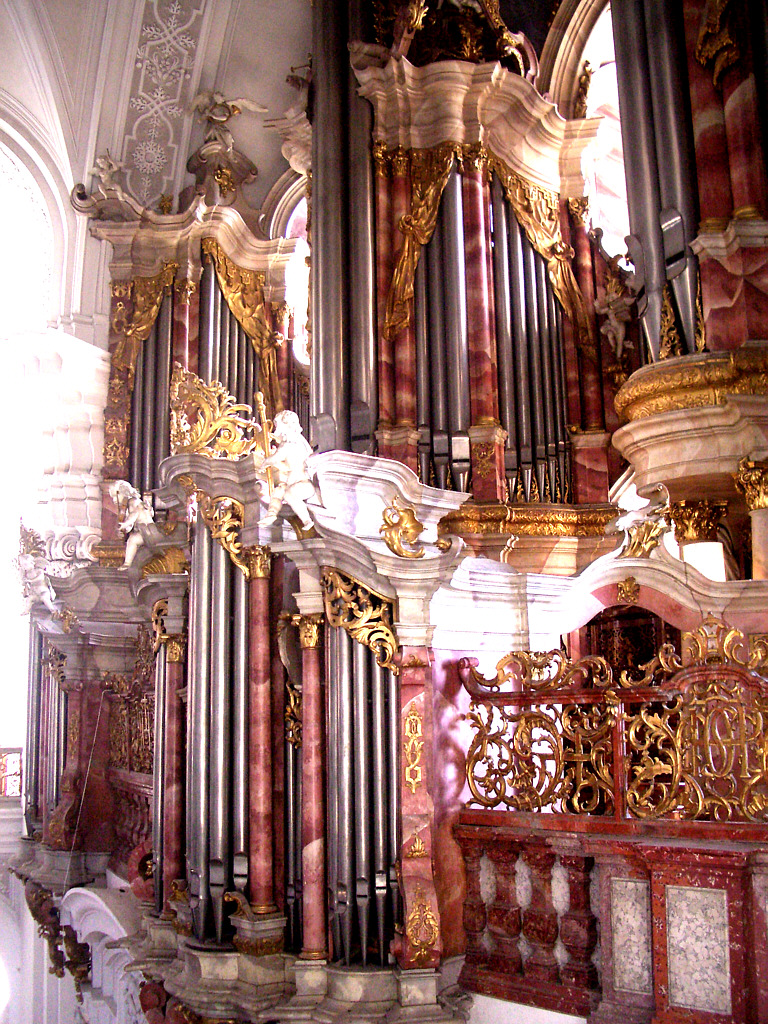
Gabler organ

- The Abbey Church of St. Martin and Oswald, also known as Münster or Basilika, is the largest Baroque church north of the Alps. It is approximately half as long as St. Peter's Basilica in Rome and hence sometimes referred to as "Swabian St. Peter". The church features a baroque organ by Joseph Gabler with 4 manuals and nearly 7,000 pipes, including a 49 rank pedal mixture "La Force" on the bottom pedal C.
- The surrounding convent and other abbey buildings are also built in Baroque style.
- The Alemans Museum displays archaeological finds from an Alemannic burial place of the early Middle Ages. It is one of the largest museums specializing in the history of the Alemans.
- The "Schlössle" ("small palace") was erected around 1550 as the administrative seat of the Imperial steward (Reichslandvogt) of Swabia. In the 18th century it was used as residence of the imperial judge, in the 19th and 20th century as a domicile of higher-ranking military officers. Since 2001 it is home to the municipal museum.

== Events ==
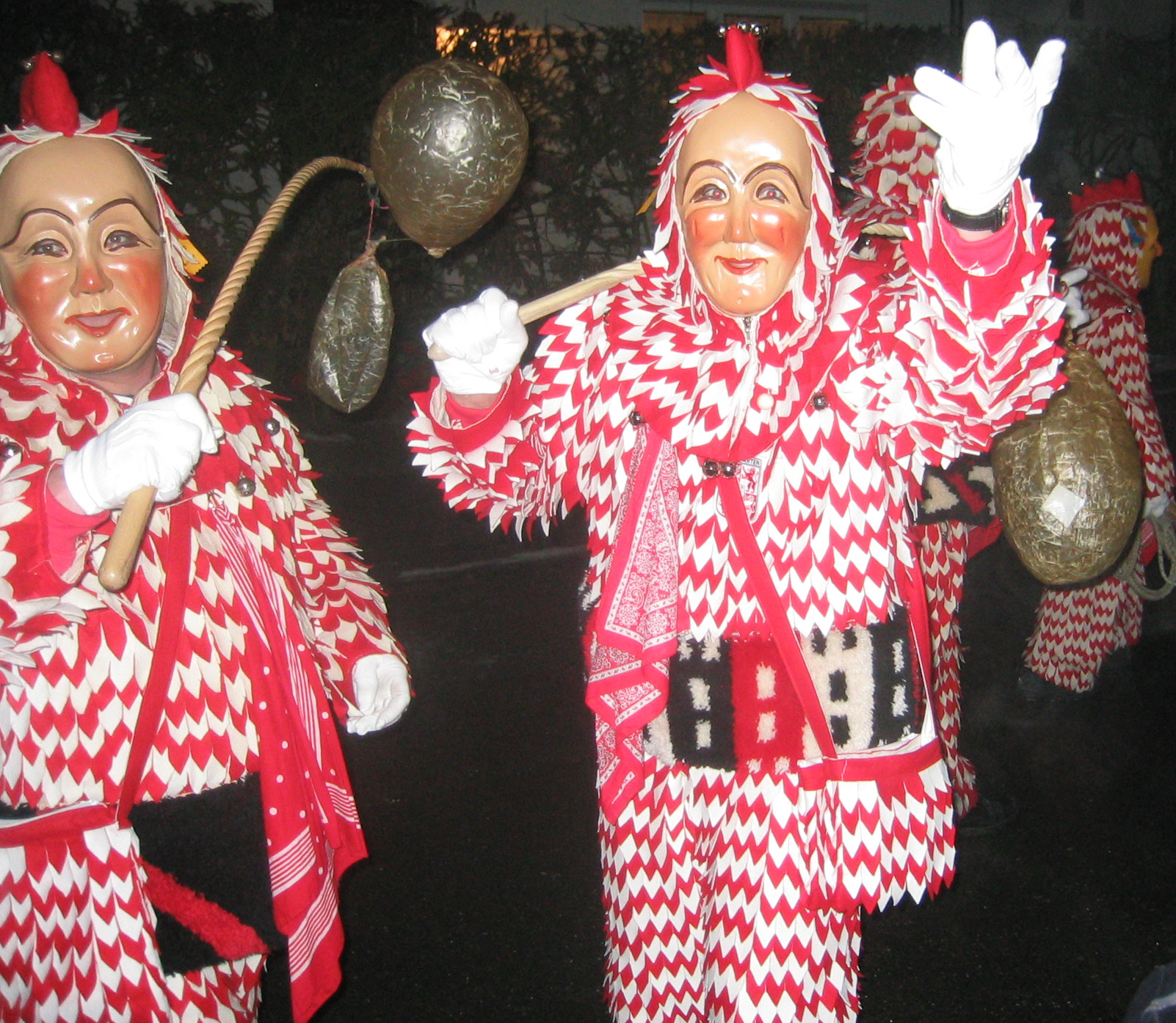
The Plätzler Guild at Carnival

=== Fasnet ===
The local tradition of the Swabian-Alemannic carnival called Fasnet can be traced back to 1348. At that time "town-hall dances" were reported, celebrating the end of a pest epidemic.

Every year, the Fasnet season starts with the Gumpige Dunnschdig (Jumpy Thursday) a week before Ash Wednesday. In the evening, the Hemedglonkerumzug (from "hemed" = nightgown in local dialect) takes place, so everybody runs through the streets in pyjamas or nightshirts. This custom symbolizes the awakening of carnival fools.

The main pageant takes place at Sunday. Typical carnival characters of Weingarten are the Plätzler (in a red and white costume, first depicted in 1868), the Lauratal ghosts and the Bockstallnarren ("buck stable fools"). In addition to these local groups, many other carnival groups from the region take part in the pageant.

=== "Blutritt" procession ===
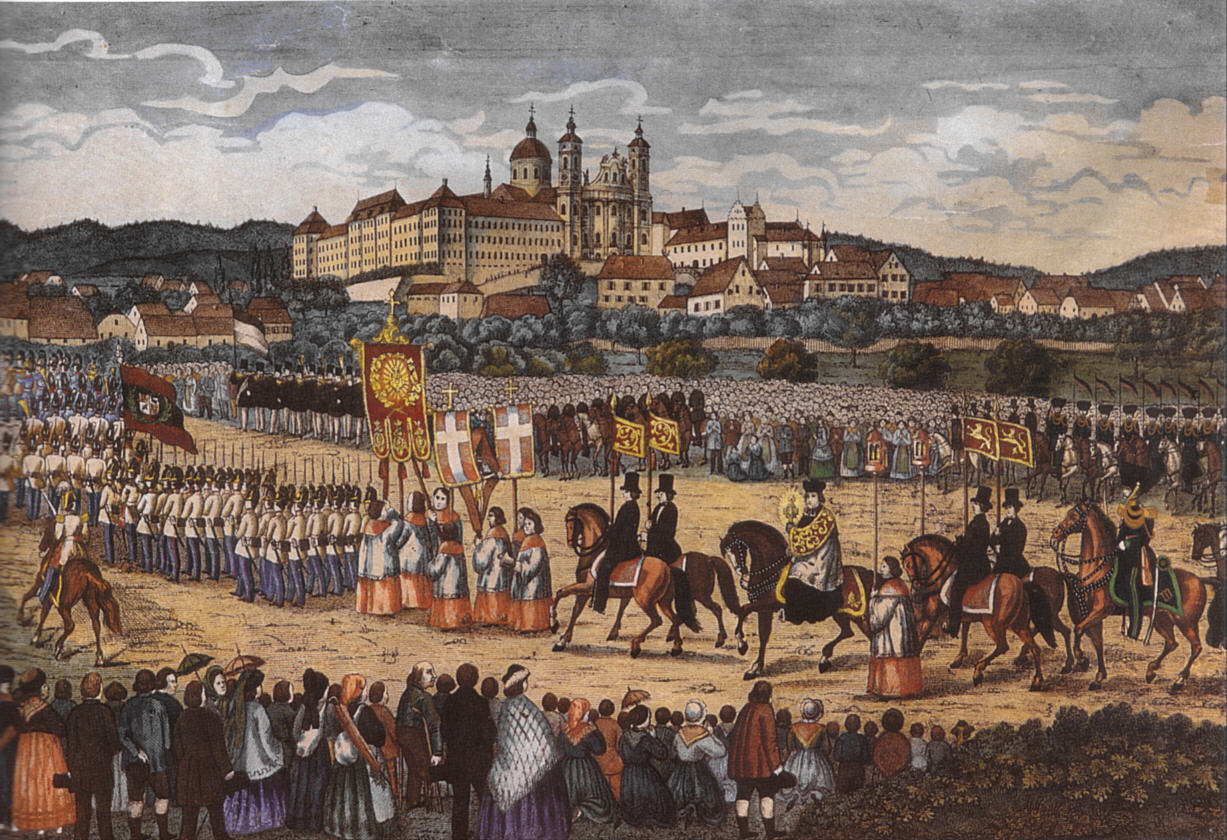
"Blutritt", about 1865

On the Friday following Ascension, Catholics from Weingarten and from most parts of Upper Swabia take part in the annual Blutritt, a large equestrian procession. The procession of about 3,000 riders and dozens of local music bands leads through the town centre and some surrounding villages to bless houses, farms and fields with a relic of the holy blood of Jesus Christ. During the rest of the year, the relic is on display in the Weingarten Abbey church.

== Notable people ==
- Konrad Huber, (DE Wiki) (1752–1830), painter
- Guido Wolf (born 1961), politician (CDU), President of the Parliament of Baden-Württemberg, 2011–2015
- Uli Boettcher, (DE Wiki) (born 1966), actor and cabaret artist
- Andreas Beck (born 1986), tennis player
- Benjamin Strasser (born 1987), lawyer and politician, (FDP), member of the Bundestag since 2017

== See also ==
- Ravensburg–Weingarten–Baienfurt tram line
