= Feather tights =

Form of costume Medieval art

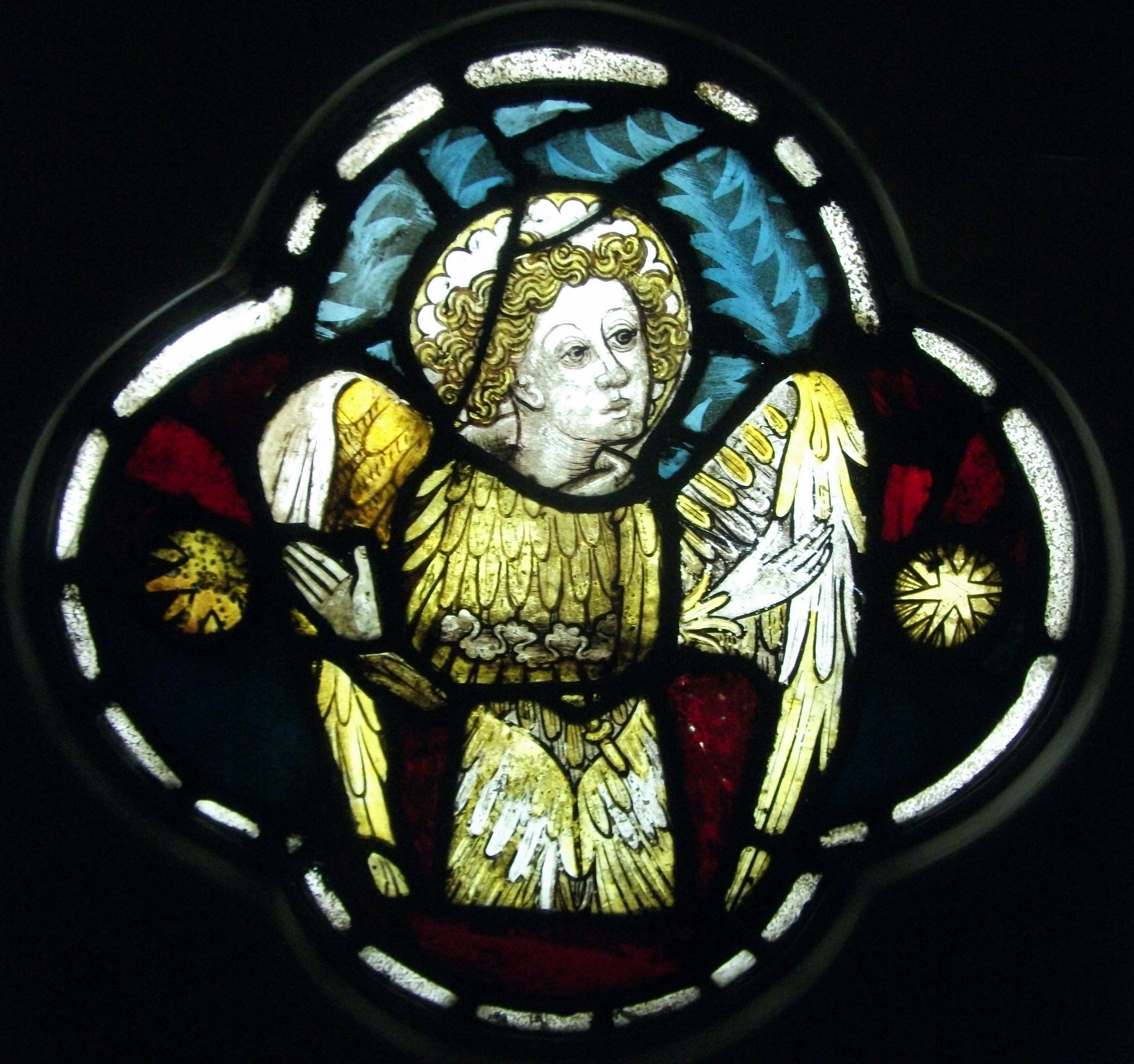
England, 15th century

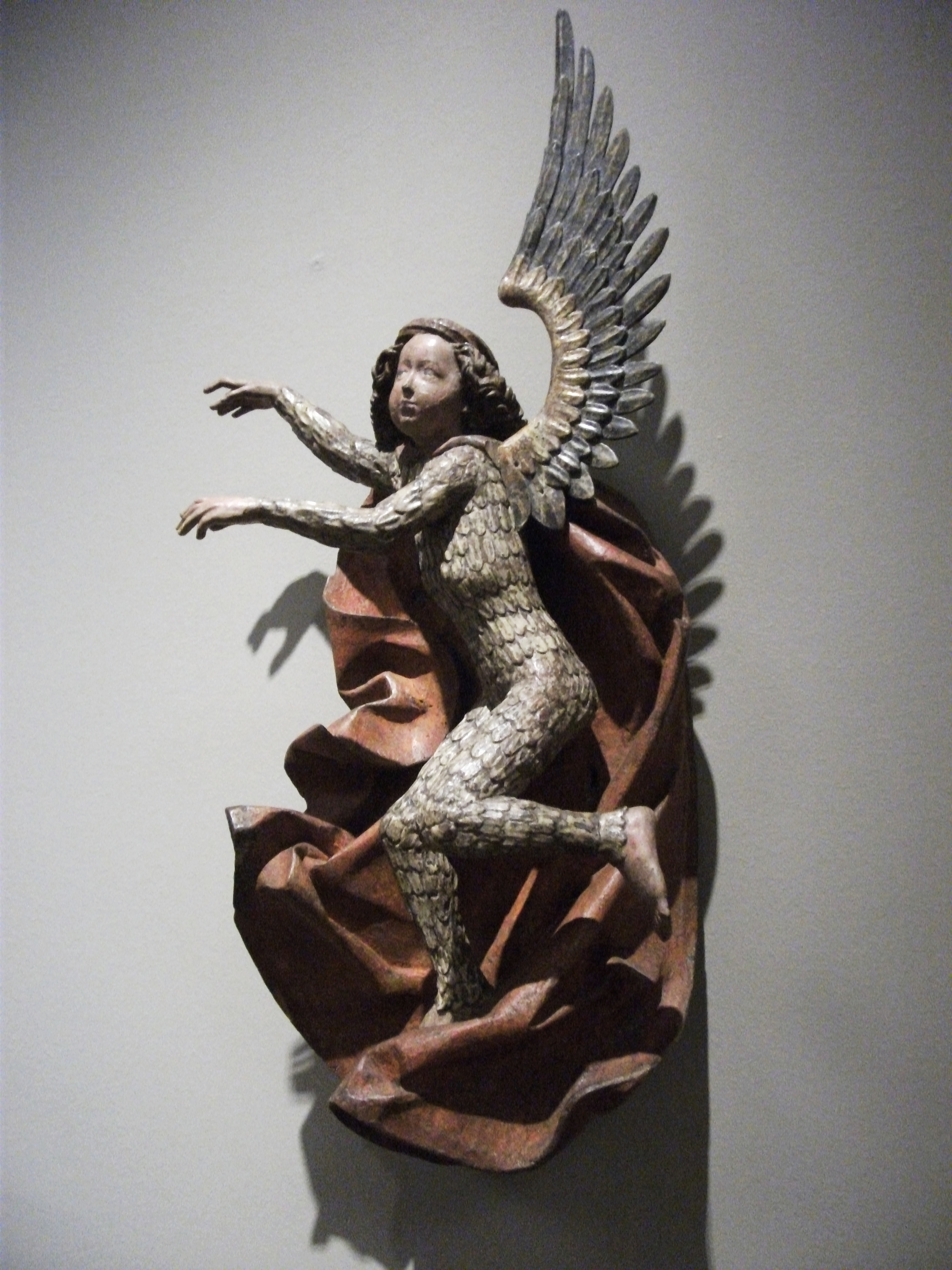
Southern Germany, c. 1530

Feather tights is the name usually given by art historians to a form of costume seen on Late Medieval depictions of angels, which shows them as if wearing a body suit with large scale-like, overlapping, downward-pointing elements representing feathers, as well as having large wings. Other sources use feathered angels to describe the style. The style is assumed to derive from actual costumes worn by those playing angels in medieval religious drama, with the "feathered" elements presumably flaps or lappets of cloth or leather sewn onto a body suit. The feathers on angels in art can often to be seen to stop abruptly at the neck, wrists and ankles, sometimes with a visible hemline, reflecting these originals.

Mary Magdalene's hair suit is another iconographic feature, with a background in hagiographic legend, whose depiction apparently borrows from religious drama.

Historians of English churches tend to refer to the feather tights style as 15th century, and by implication essentially English, but it can be seen in several major late medieval European works from the late 14th to early 16th centuries. These include the Holy Thorn Reliquary in the British Museum, made by a court goldsmith in Paris in the 1390s, and on two wooden angels from South Germany around 1530 (Museum Kunstpalast Düsseldorf, right), as well as two stone ones hovering over the Lamentation of Christ by Tilman Riemenschneider at Maidbronn (1526), and others on Veit Stoss's wooden altarpiece at Bamberg Cathedral (1520–1523). There is also a figure with greenish-black feathers, in Matthias Grünewald's Isenheim Altarpiece of 1515.

The "devil in his feathers" featured in the Chester Midsummer Watch Parade as late as the 1590s, provided by the butcher's guild; these parades had originally used the costumes from the Chester Plays, where "the devil in his feathers, all ragger [ragged] and rent" also appeared. An early English version of the style is found in the Egerton Genesis Picture Book, an unusual and much discussed illuminated manuscript attributed by the British Library (who own it) to "England, S.E. or N. (Norwich or Durham?)" in the "3rd quarter of the 14th century".

== Context ==
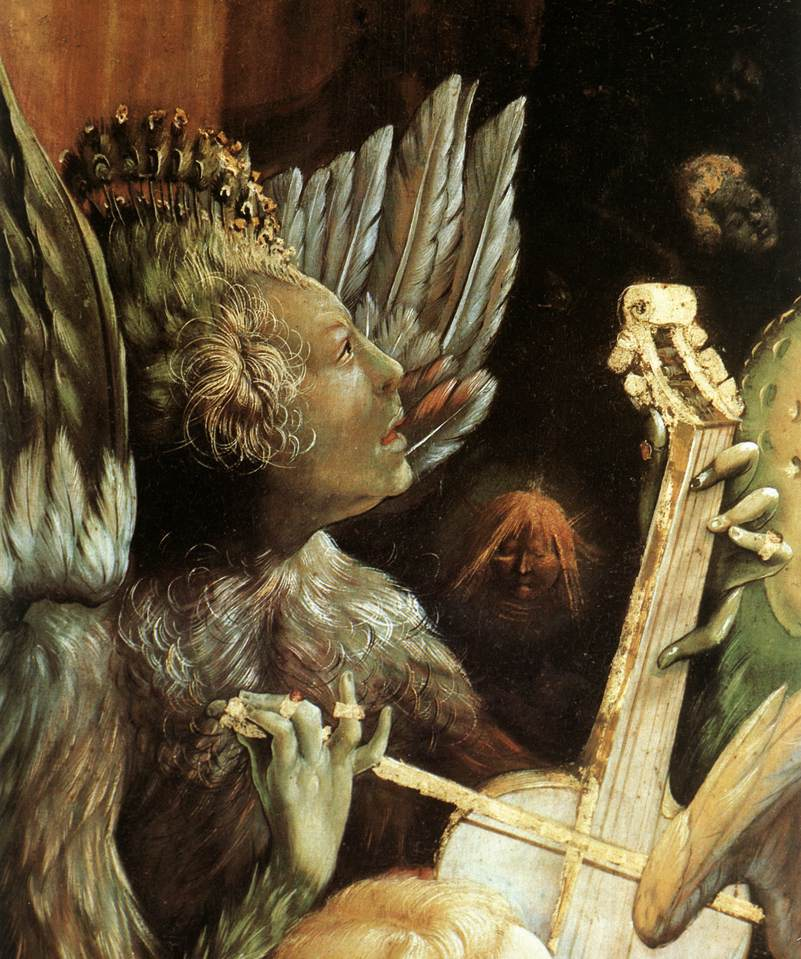
Feathered "Lucifer", Isenheim Altarpiece, c. 1512–1516

It is believed that this practice arose from medieval liturgical dramas and mystery plays, in which the actors portraying angels wore garments covered with feathers to emphasize their power of flight, often standing on "clouds" of wool. Costumed angels also might be introduced for one-off special occasions: at the coronation of Henry VII's queen, Elizabeth of York, in 1487 an angel swinging a large censer was lowered from the roof of Old St Paul's Cathedral, and at the marriage of their son Arthur to Catherine of Aragon in 1501, the archangel Raphael was part of the ceremony, with "goldyn and glyteryng wingis and ffedyrs of many and sundry colours".

The feathering might be used as a substitute for other clothing, or under vestments or Saint Michael's armour. Feathered tights are not to be confused with the feathers of the extra pairs of wings traditionally attributed to cherubim and other higher orders of angels, which are often shown pointing downwards covering the legs. Further enhancements to actor's costumes might include expensive real peacock feathers to represent the "eyed" wing feathers of the cherubim; elsewhere whether real or simulated feathers, or a combination, were worn by actors is unclear. The more common and traditional angelic costume of an alb-like robe flowing to the feet was also used in drama, as records show.

The depictions may be in wood, stone or alabaster, or glass. The well-preserved church of St Mary the Virgin, Ewelme has examples in wood on the roof and the top of the large font cover, and in stone and alabaster round the tomb monument to Alice de la Pole, Duchess of Suffolk, and the Beauchamp Chapel in the Collegiate Church of St Mary, Warwick has ones in stone (still painted) and glass. Other examples from English churches in painted or stained glass are at Great Malvern Priory, St Nicholas, Blakeney and Cawston, Norfolk, St Peter Hungate in Norwich and the Victoria and Albert Museum (Norwich School), which also has a large painted Nottingham alabaster figure of the Archangel Michael some 70 cm (28 in) tall. The rare surviving wall paintings on the crossing-arch at St Mary's Attleborough, Norfolk include two prominent feathered angels.

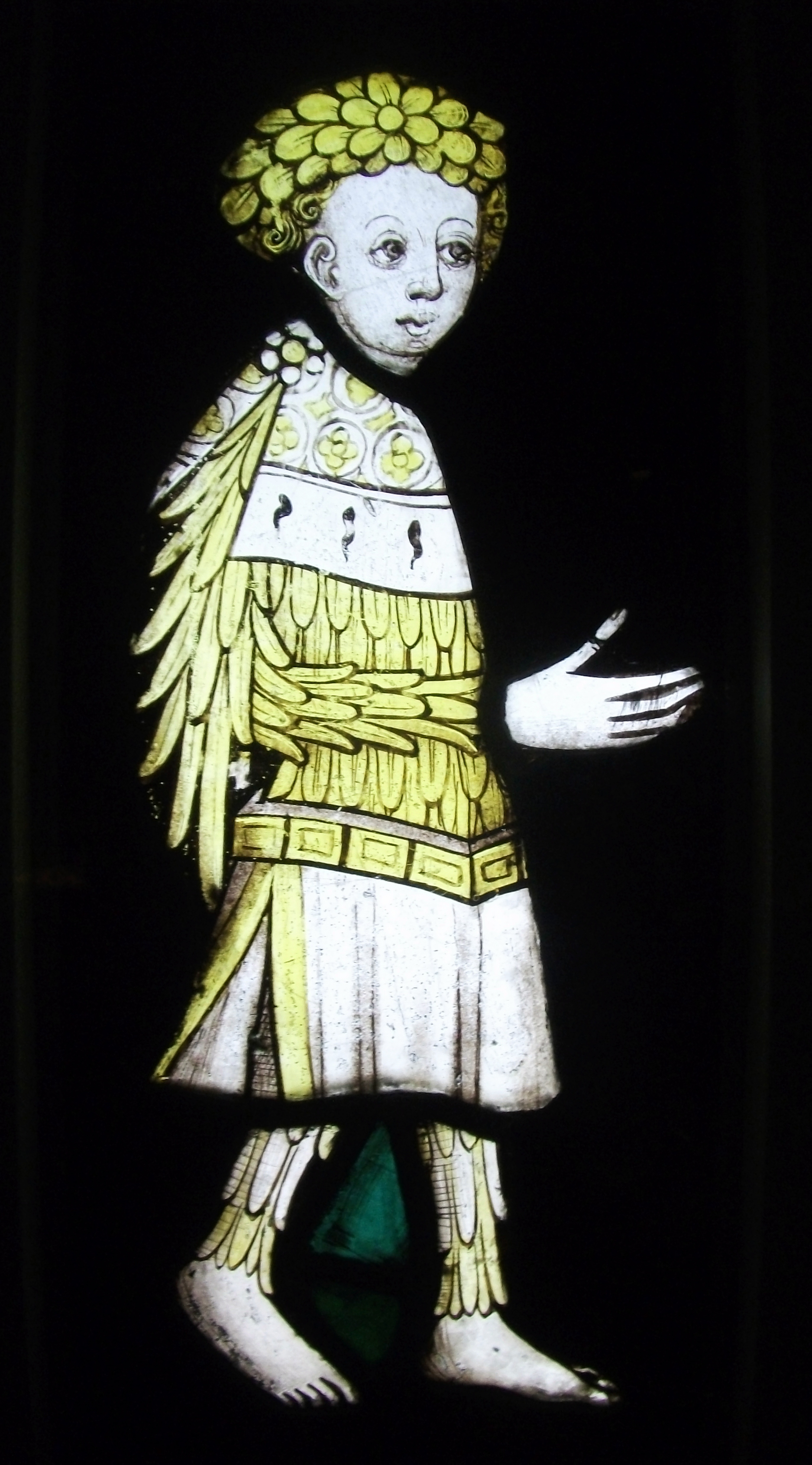
English 15th-century fragment in the Burrell Collection

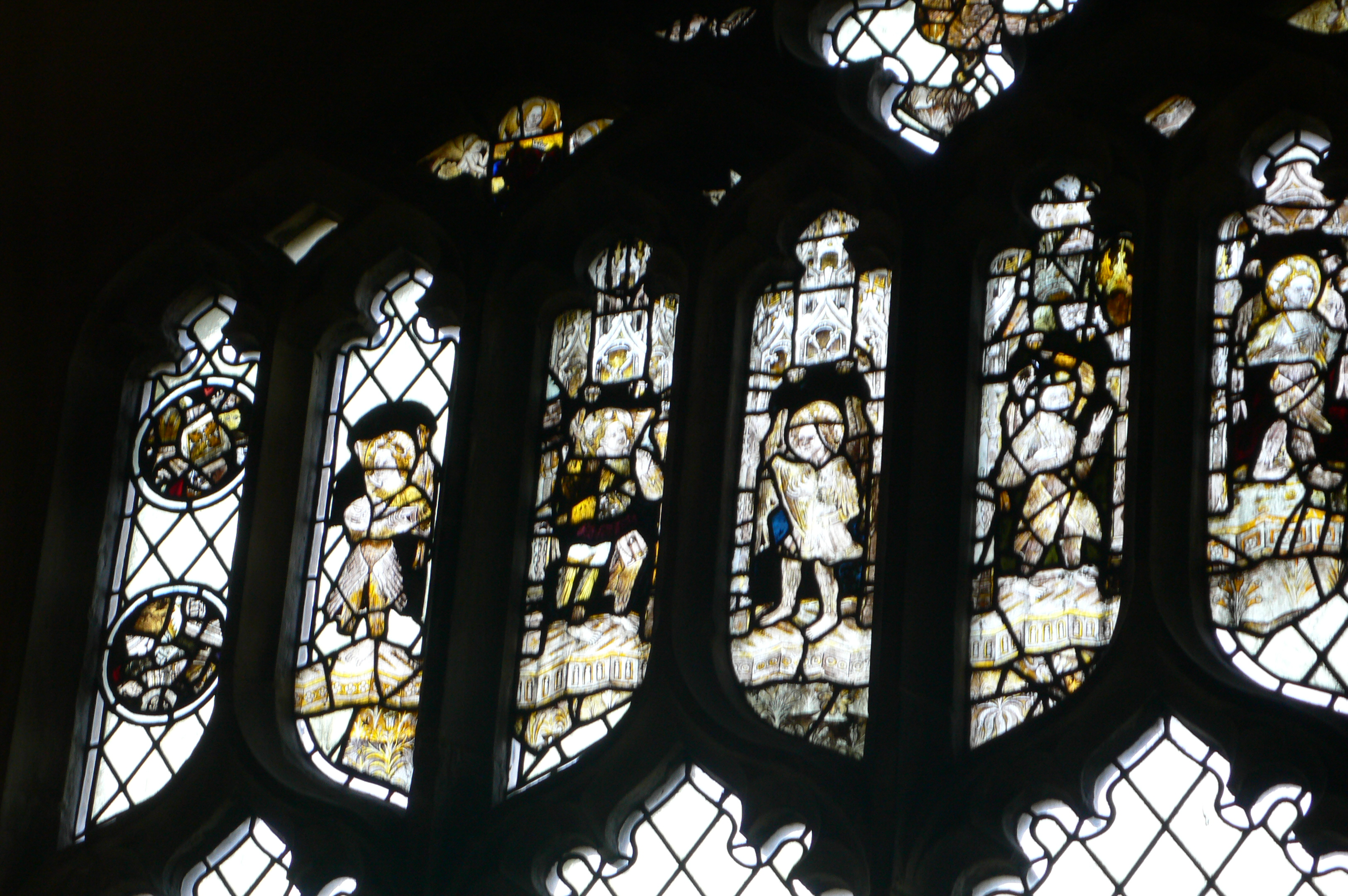
St Nicholas, Blakeney

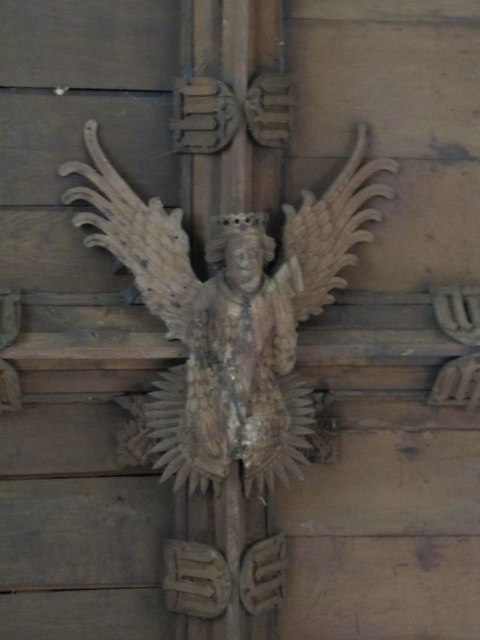
St Mary the Virgin, Ewelme

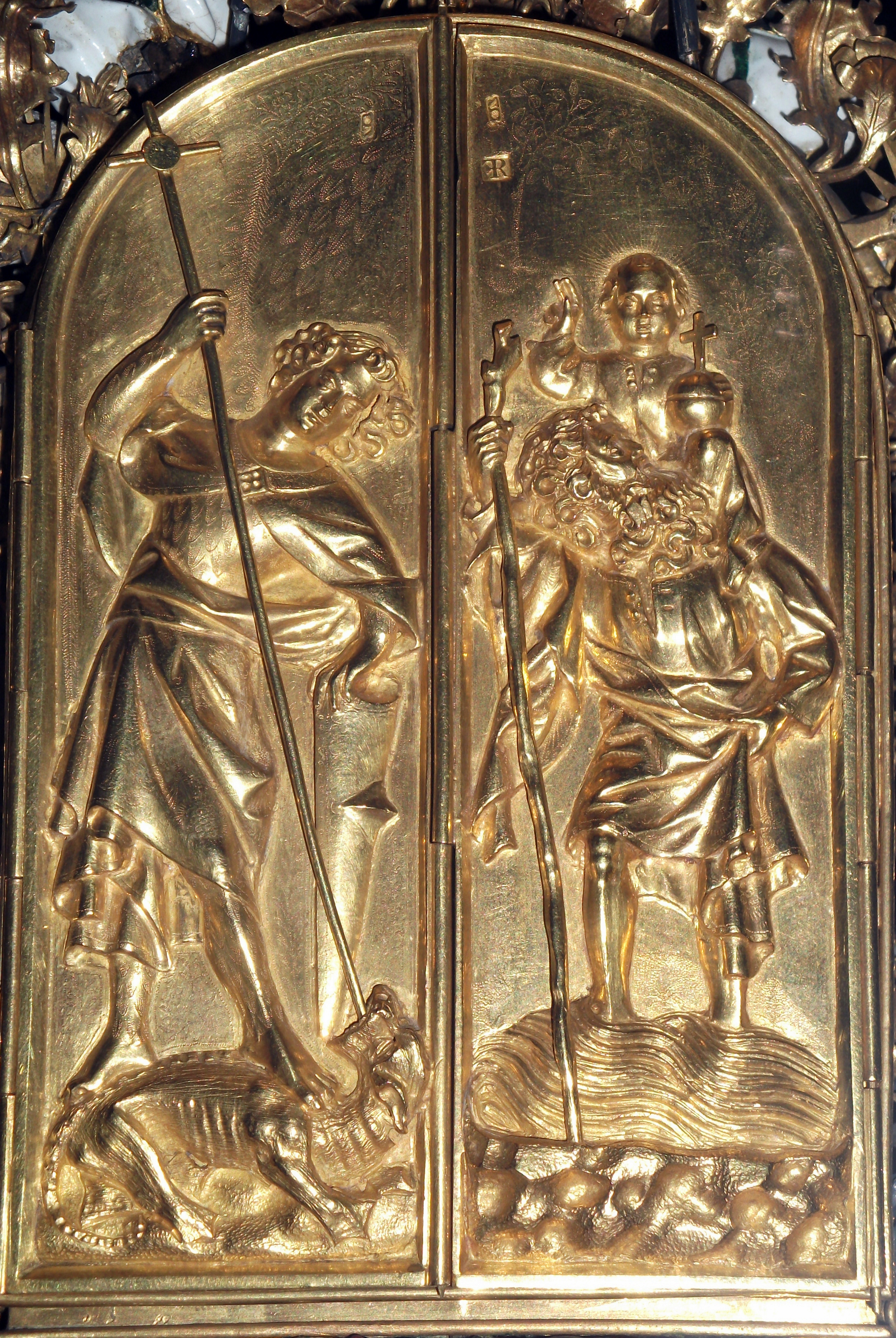
Archangel Michael on the Holy Thorn Reliquary, 1390s

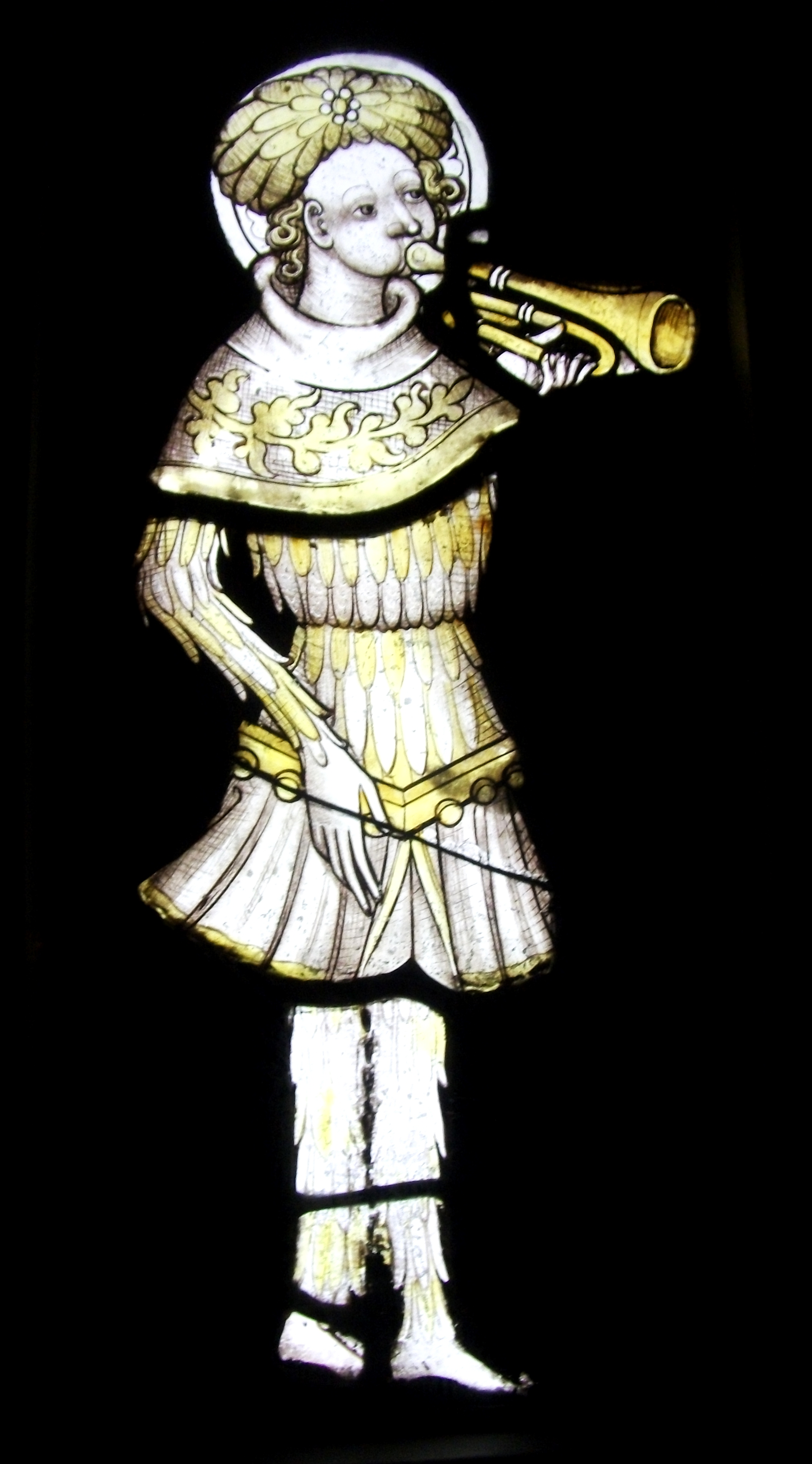
Another Burrell Collection fragment

== Mary Magdalene's hair suit ==
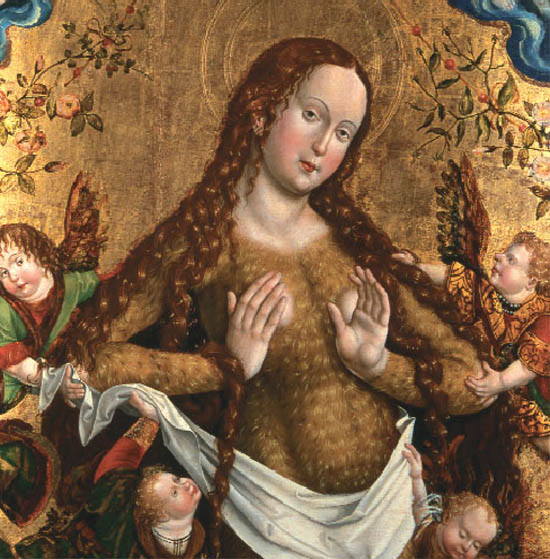
Detail of altarpiece by Jan Polack, c. 1500

A similar depiction of the penitent Mary Magdalene appears in some Southern German works around mostly 1500, but with body hair rather than feathers. The earliest may be in the scene of Mary's last Holy Communion in Lucas Moser's Altar with scenes from the life of the Magdalene in Tiefenbronn, from 1432. Tilman Riemenschneider's carved figure in the Münnerstadt Altar (1490–1492), now the Bayerisches Nationalmuseum, Munich, is the best known. According to medieval legend the Magdalene had spent a period of repentance as a desert hermit after leaving her life as a prostitute and her life as a follower of Jesus. Her story became conflated in the West with that of Saint Mary of Egypt, a 4th-century prostitute turned hermit, whose clothes wore out and fell off in the desert. In earlier medieval depictions Mary's long hair entirely covers her body and preserves her modesty, but in these her hair is more naturalistic and does not do so.

Instead she has a coat of hair somewhat like a dog's, ending rather neatly at the neck, wrists and ankles, suggesting derivation from a theatrical costume, as with the feather suits. The suits, which are mainly consistent in depiction, do not cover her breasts or knees, or sometimes elbows. The bare patches on the knees and elbows probably are meant to have been worn bare by Mary praying on her knees, resting her elbows on a rock ledge, as she is often shown in later paintings of the Penitent Magdalen. The lack of hair on the breasts presumably follows the pattern of body hair typical of mammals and familiar to late medieval Germans from farm animals such as sheep and cattle.

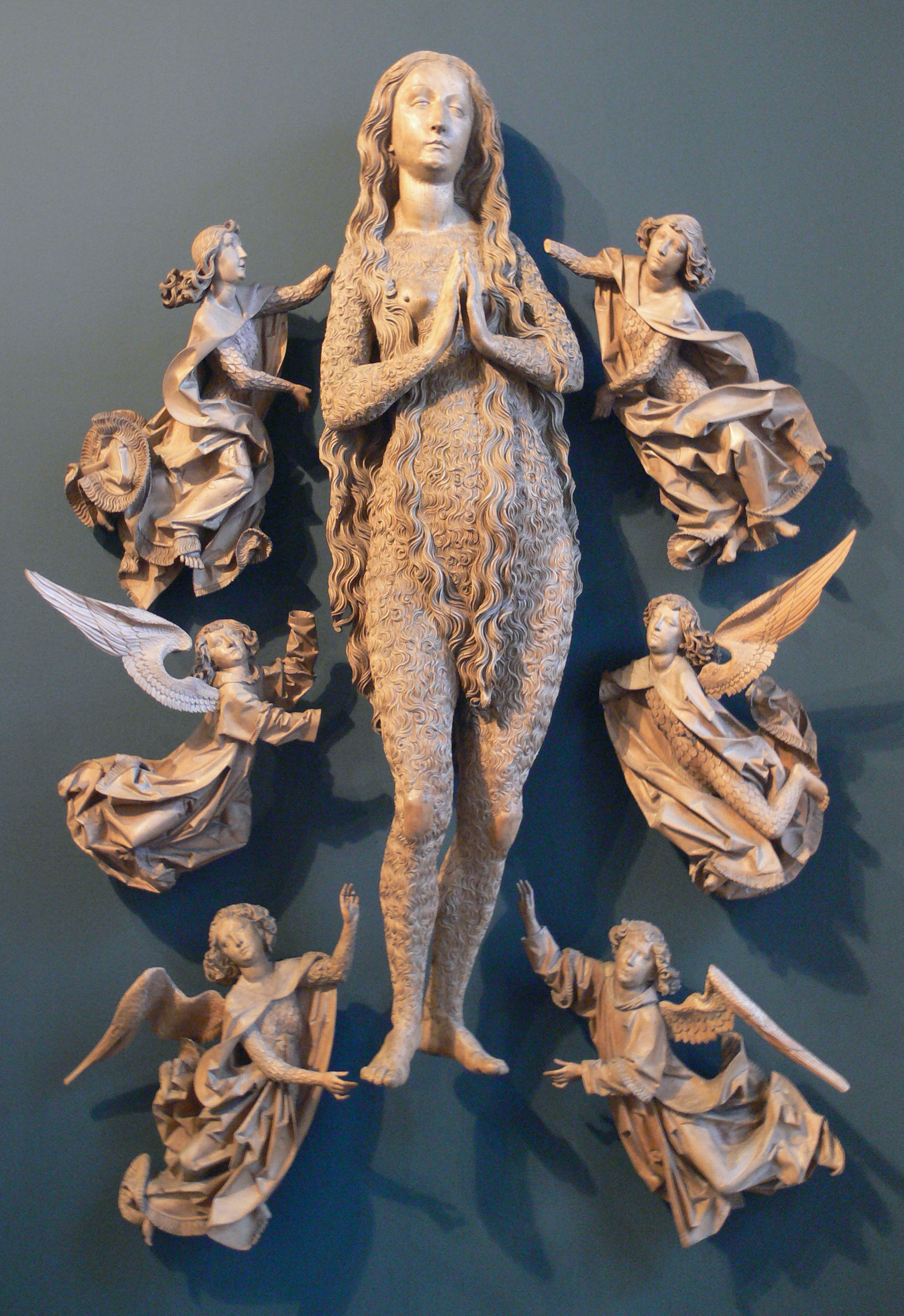
Tilman Riemenschneider, part of the Münnerstadt Altar (1490–1492)

Most such images depict the "Ascension" or Elevation of Mary Magdalene, showing the regular visits of angels to Mary's desert home (actually in Provence in the South of France according to the legend) to raise her into the air and feed her heavenly food. In the words of William Caxton's English translation of the Golden Legend:

... the blessed Mary Magdalene, desirous of sovereign contemplation, sought a right sharp desert, and took a place which was ordained by the angel of God, and abode there by the space of thirty years without knowledge of anybody. In which place she had no comfort of running water, ne solace of trees, ne of herbs. And that was because our Redeemer did do show it openly, that he had ordained for her refection celestial, and no bodily meats. And every day at every hour canonical she was lifted up in the air of angels, and heard the glorious song of the heavenly companies with her bodily ears. Of which she was fed and filled with right sweet meats, and then was brought again by the angels unto her proper place, in such wise as she had no need of corporal nourishing.

Moser's altar shows the scene of her last Holy Communion after her return to the world and just before her death, as recounted in the Golden Legend:

[Saint Maximinus] saw the blessed Mary Magdalene standing in the quire or choir yet among the angels that brought her, and was lift up from the earth the space of two or three cubits. And praying to our Lord she held up her hands, and when S. Maximin saw her, he was afraid to approach to her. And she returned to him, and said: Come hither mine own father, and flee not thy daughter. And when he approached and came to her, as it is read in the books of the said S. Maximin, for the customable vision that she had of angels every day, the cheer and visage of her shone as clear as it had been the rays of the sun. And then all the clerks and the priests aforesaid were called, and Mary Magdalene received the body and blood of our Lord of the hands of the bishop with great abundance of tears, and after, she stretched her body tofore the altar, and her right blessed soul departed from the body and went to our Lord.

The relief panels on the inside of the shutters of the Münnerstadt Altar show four scenes from the life of Mary Magdalene, with her covered in body hair in the last two, showing her last Communion and burial (these are still in the church).

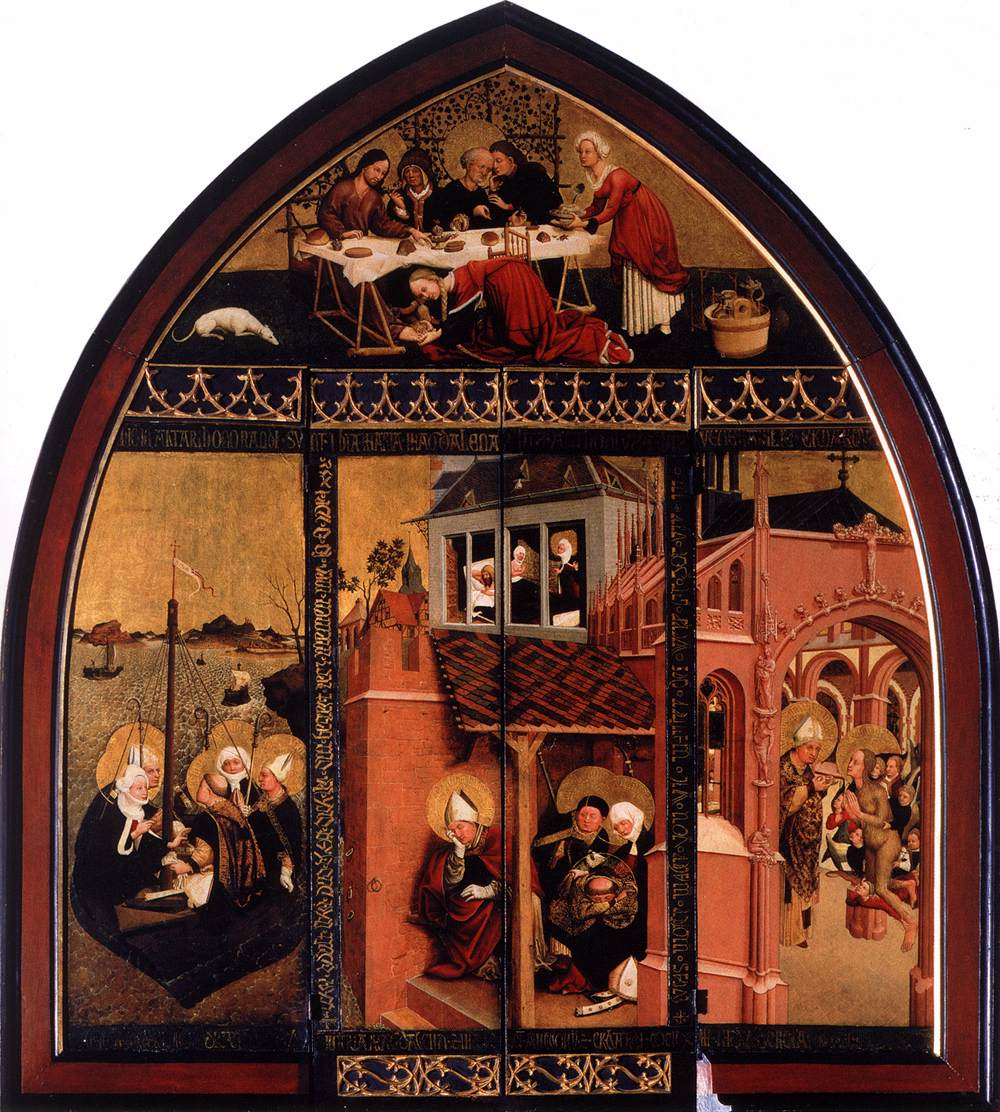
Lucas Moser, Magdalene Altar, Tiefenbronn, 1432 (see bottom right scene)

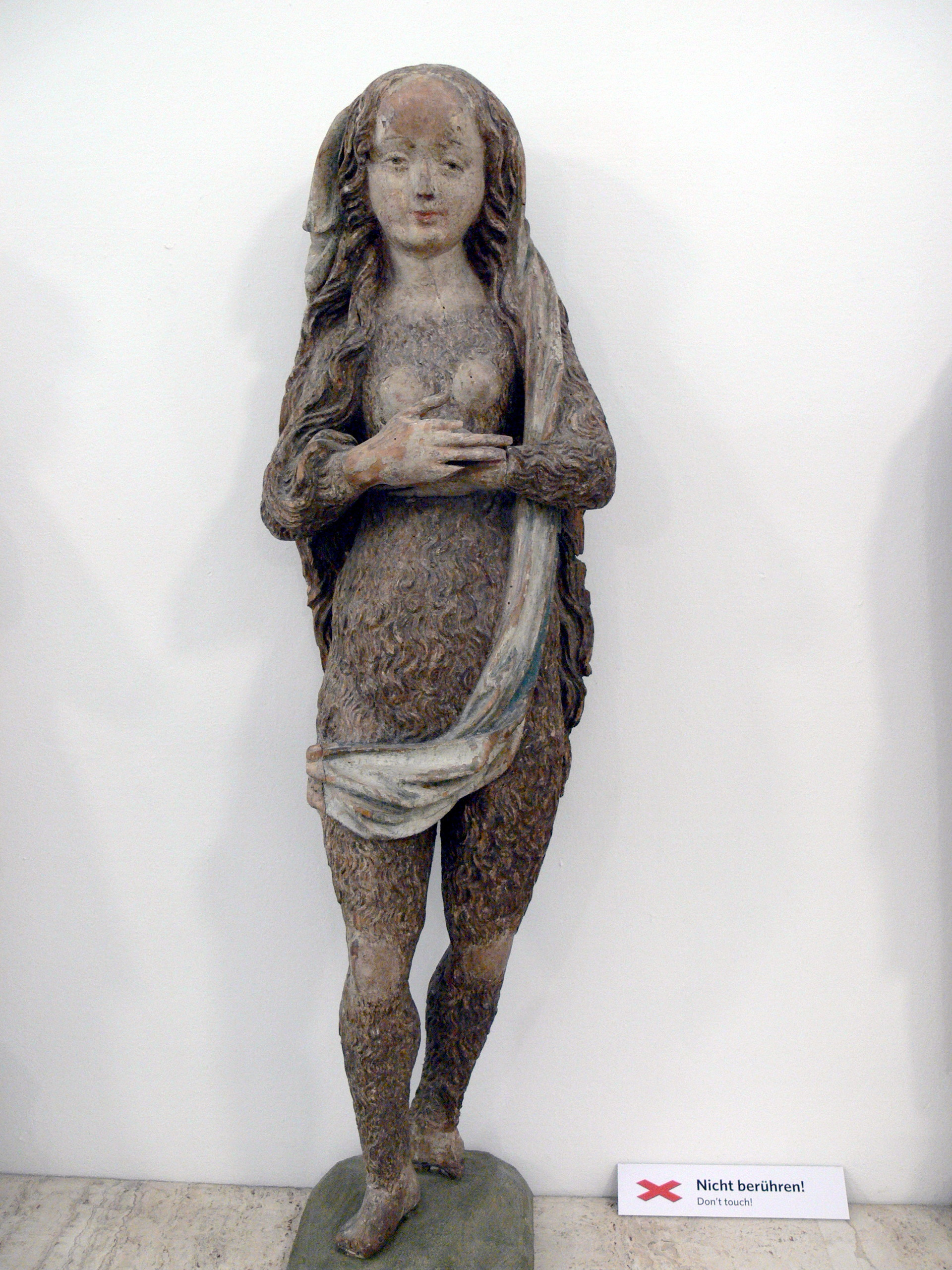
15th century, wood, from Altschwendt, Austria

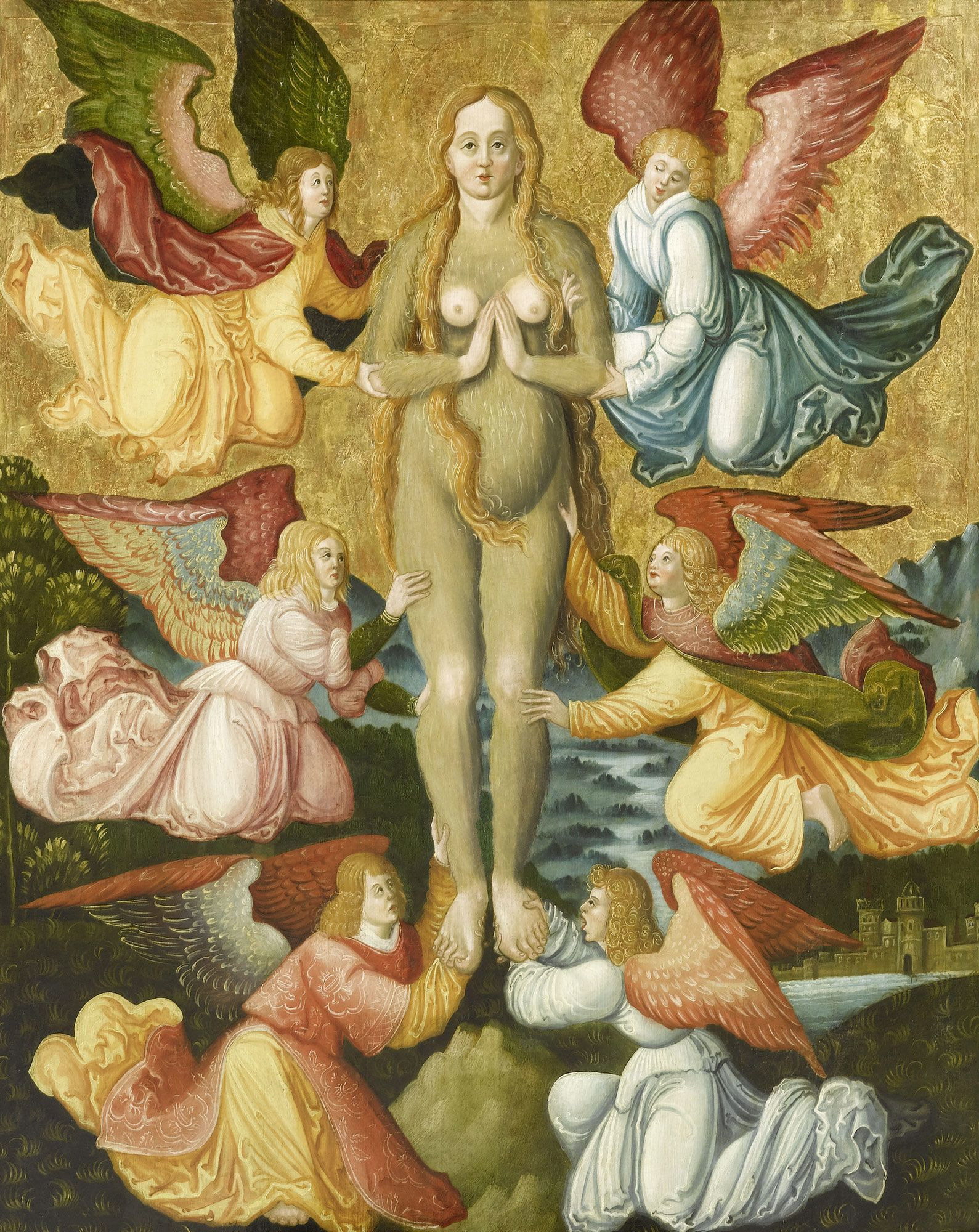
Danube school, c. 1510

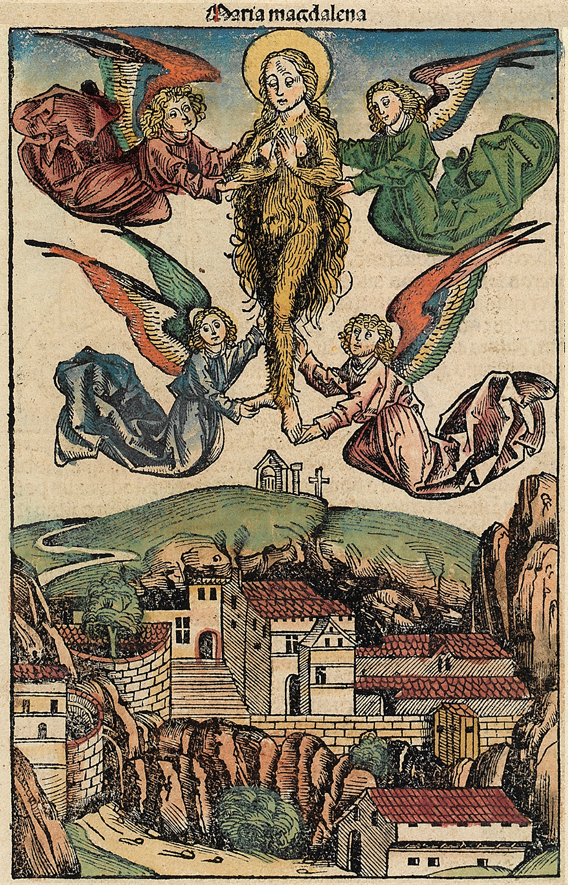
Nuremberg Chronicle, coloured woodcut, 1493

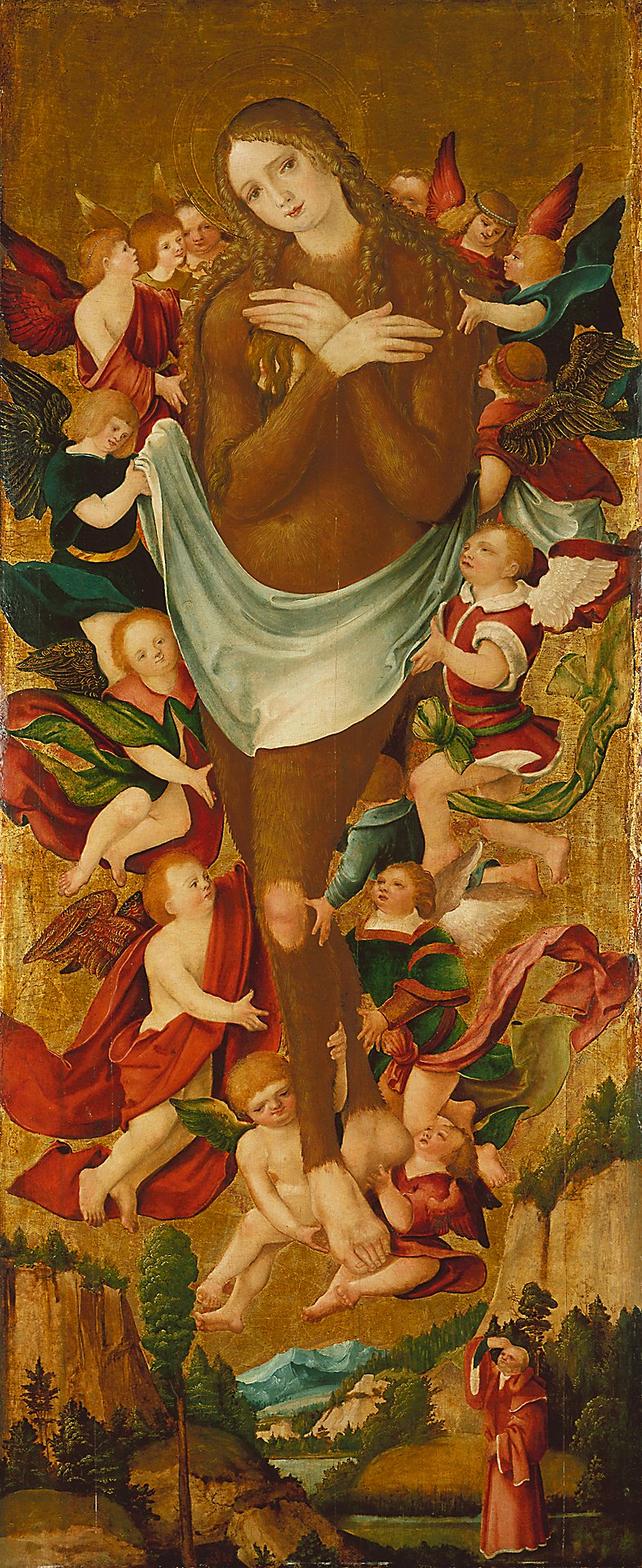
Peter Strüb the Younger (Master of Messkirch), 16th century, Tempera on panel
