= Peter Nick =

German molecular biologist (born 1962)

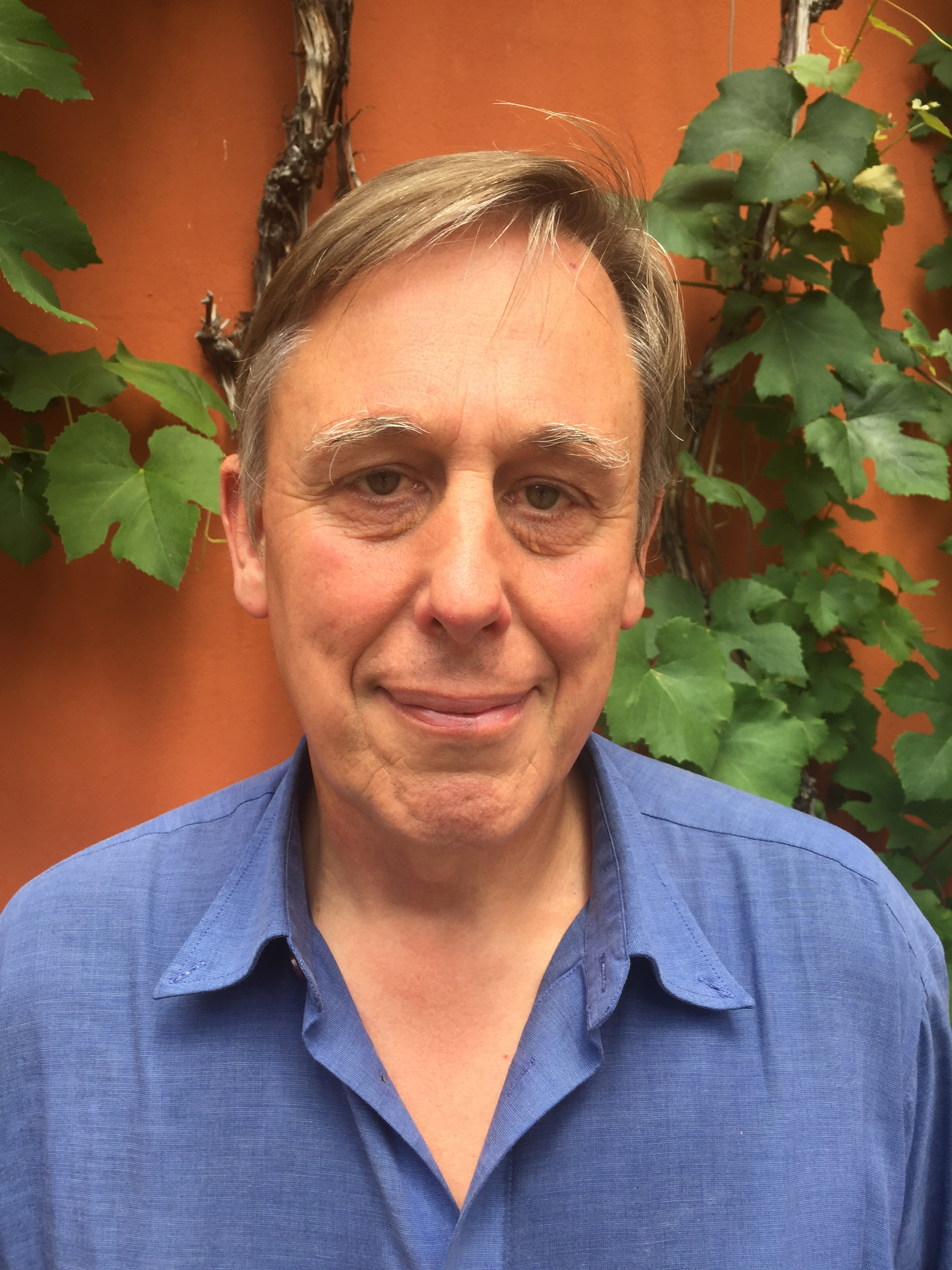
Peter Nick 2018

Peter Nick (born 1 October 1962 in Leutkirch im Allgäu) is a German molecular biologist, and head of Molecular Cell Biology at the Karlsruhe Institute of Technology (KIT), and long-standing Academic Dean for Chemistry und Biology, He was co-initiator of the Forum for Critical Transdisciplinary Studies (FKI) and recipient of the State Teaching Award of Baden-Württemberg in 2015.

== Biography ==
After primary school in Schloss Zeil and secondary school Leutkirch in Allgäu until 1981 Nick studied biology at the Albert-Ludwigs-University Freiburg (1981–1986) with an exchange semester at the University of St Andrews in Scotland.

He passed diploma exams in biology in Freiburg and obtained a doctorate in 1990 with the grade summa cum laude under the guidance of Eberhard Schäfer (scientist). After research visits to the Frontier Research-Program, Wako-shi in Japan and the CNRS-IBMP in Strasbourg, he was appointed professor with Venia legendi in botany in 1996. As assistant and senior assistant at the Institute of Botany II in Freiburg he became youth research leader of the project „Dynamics of the plant cell skeleton – molecular cell biology in vivo“, which had been set up by the VW foundation, in 1999.

In 2003 Nick was appointed professor of molecular cell biology at the University of Karlsruhe at the Botanical Institut 1, and became its head in 1995. From 2004 until 2014 he was in addition academic dean at the Faculty of Chemistry und Biological Sciences. He refused positions at the universities of Frankfurt, Darmstadt und Salzburg.

He received the State Award Baden-Württemberg together with Mathias Gutmann 2015 for the Initiative Forum for Critical Transdisciplinary Studies (FKI).

Nick is married with two children.

== Honors ==
- 1981: Winner of the Baden-Württemberg State Award for Youth Research
- 1981–1990: Stipendium and doctoral stipendium of the German National Academic Foundation
- 1990–1992: Stipendium at the Science and Technology Agency, Japan
- 1992–1994: Stipendium at the Human Frontier Science Program Organization
- 1994–1996: Professorship stipendium of the German Research Foundation
- 1999–2004: Youth group of the Volkswagen Foundation
- 2007: Teaching Award of the Faculty of Chemistry und Biological Sciences, TU Karlsruhe
- 2014: Teaching Award of the Faculty of Chemistry und Biological Sciences, KIT
- 2015: Teaching Award of the State of Baden-Württemberg
- 2016: Member of the Vitifutur Intereg Project

== Publications (selection) ==
- 1985 Bachelor Sci. Thesisː „Heterophylly in a Potamogeton Species“
- 1986 Diplomarbeitː „Photogravitropism and Polarity in maize kernels“
- 1990 Dissertationː „Experiments on Tropism, Cross Polarity and Microtubules“
- 1996 Professorial Thesisː „Single Cells and Plant Form“
- 2003 editor-in-chief of PROTOPLASMA
- 2005 Professor and Head of the Botanical Institute 1, Karlsruhe
- 2011 Series Editor Plant Cell Monographs (Springer)
