= Eberhard Schäfer =

Eberhard Schäfer may refer to:

- Eberhard Schäfer, German Luftwaffe Leutnant List of Knight's Cross of the Iron Cross recipients (Sa–Schr)
- Eberhard Schäfer (scientist), German Plant Physiologist
