= Tiefenbrunn =

Tiefenbrunn may refer to:

- Eran Tiefenbrunn, Israeli journalist
- Franziska Tiefenbrunn, wife of Heinrich Ernst Göring, mother of Hermann Göring
- Tiefenbrunn, Soviet military townlet in East Germany, see 3rd Guards Spetsnaz Brigade
- Tiefenbrunn, Black Sea Germans colony, Russian Empire. now uk:Чистопілля (Пологівський район), Ukfraine

== See also ==
- Tiefenbronn
