= Lucas Moser =

German painter

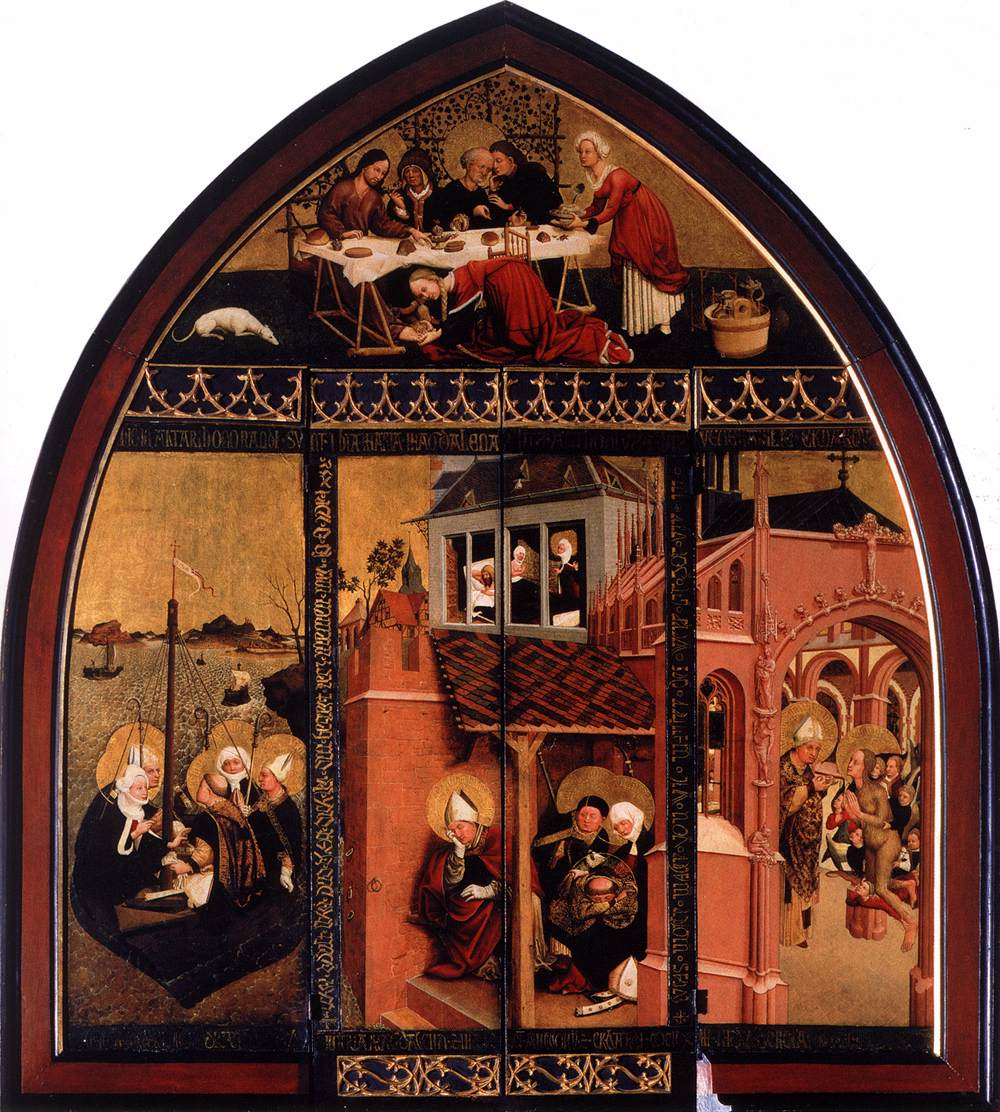
The Magdalene Altar by Lucas Moser, St. Mary Magdalene Church, Tiefenbronn, 1432

Lucas Moser (c 1390 – c 1434), was a German Late-Gothic painter.

He was born in Ulm, and is part of the early Ulm School of artists such as Hans Multscher. Not much is known about his life. Moser's name is known only through an inscription on the frame of the altarpiece above the altar of St. Mary Magdalene parish church in Tiefenbronn. This altarpiece, which depicts Mary Magdalene's sea voyage to France, is a significant work which represents a shift from the International Gothic to a more natural Realism style and technique, similar to Early Netherlandish painting.
