= Willi Halder =

German politician (1958–2025)

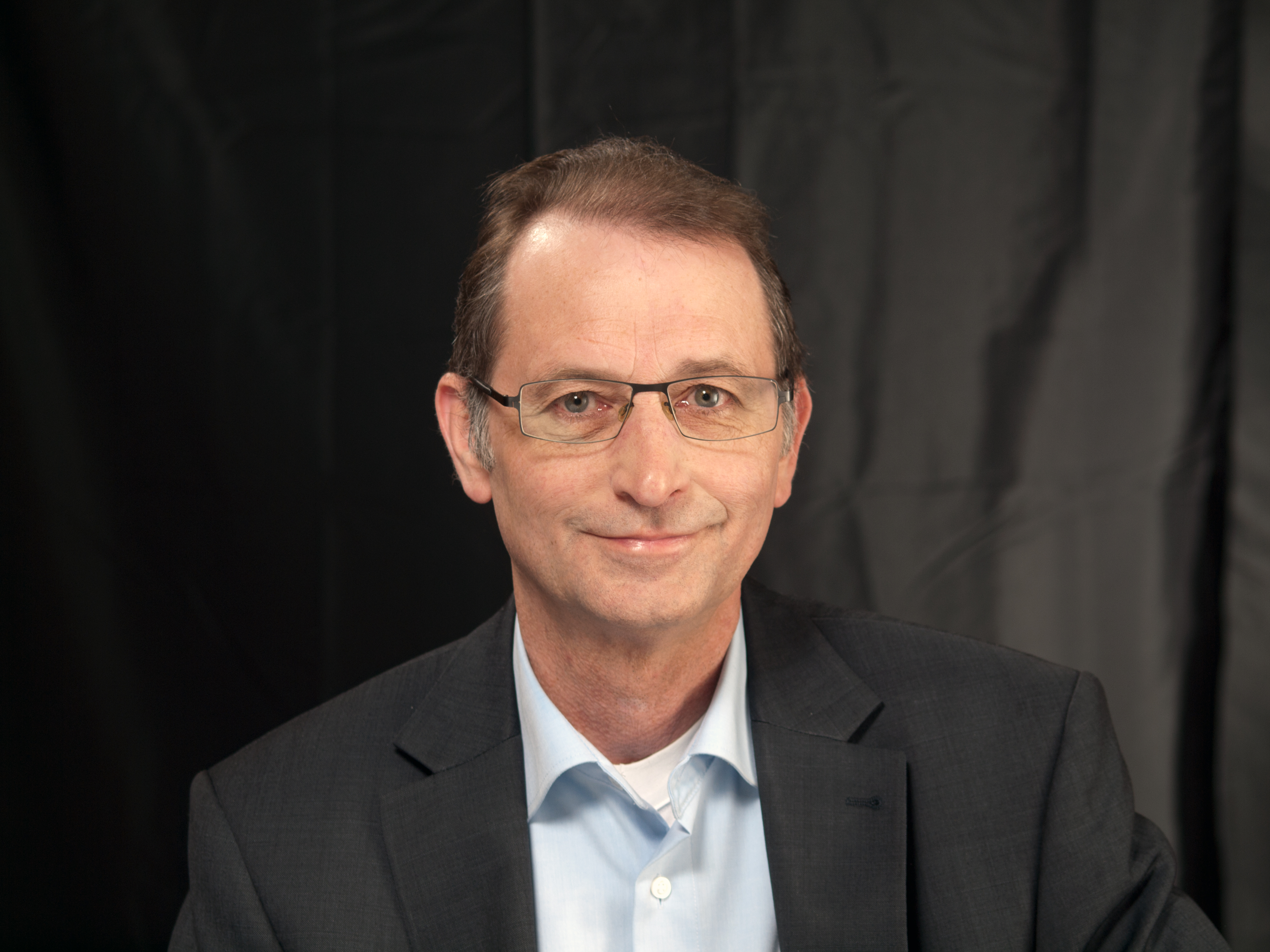
- Halder in 2013

Member of the Landtag of Baden-Württemberg
- In office 27 March 2011 – 14 March 2021

Personal details
- Born: Wilhelm Halder; 13 July 1958 Leutkirch im Allgäu, Baden-Württemberg, West Germany
- Died: 20 November 2025 (aged 67)
- Party: Alliance 90/The Greens
- Occupation: Publisher

Wilhelm Halder (13 July 1958 – 20 November 2025) was a German politician. A member of Alliance 90/The Greens, he served in the Landtag of Baden-Württemberg from 2011 to 2021.

Halder died on 20 November 2025, at the age of 67.
