= Herlazhofen =

South German village

Coordinates: 47°48′N 10°01′E

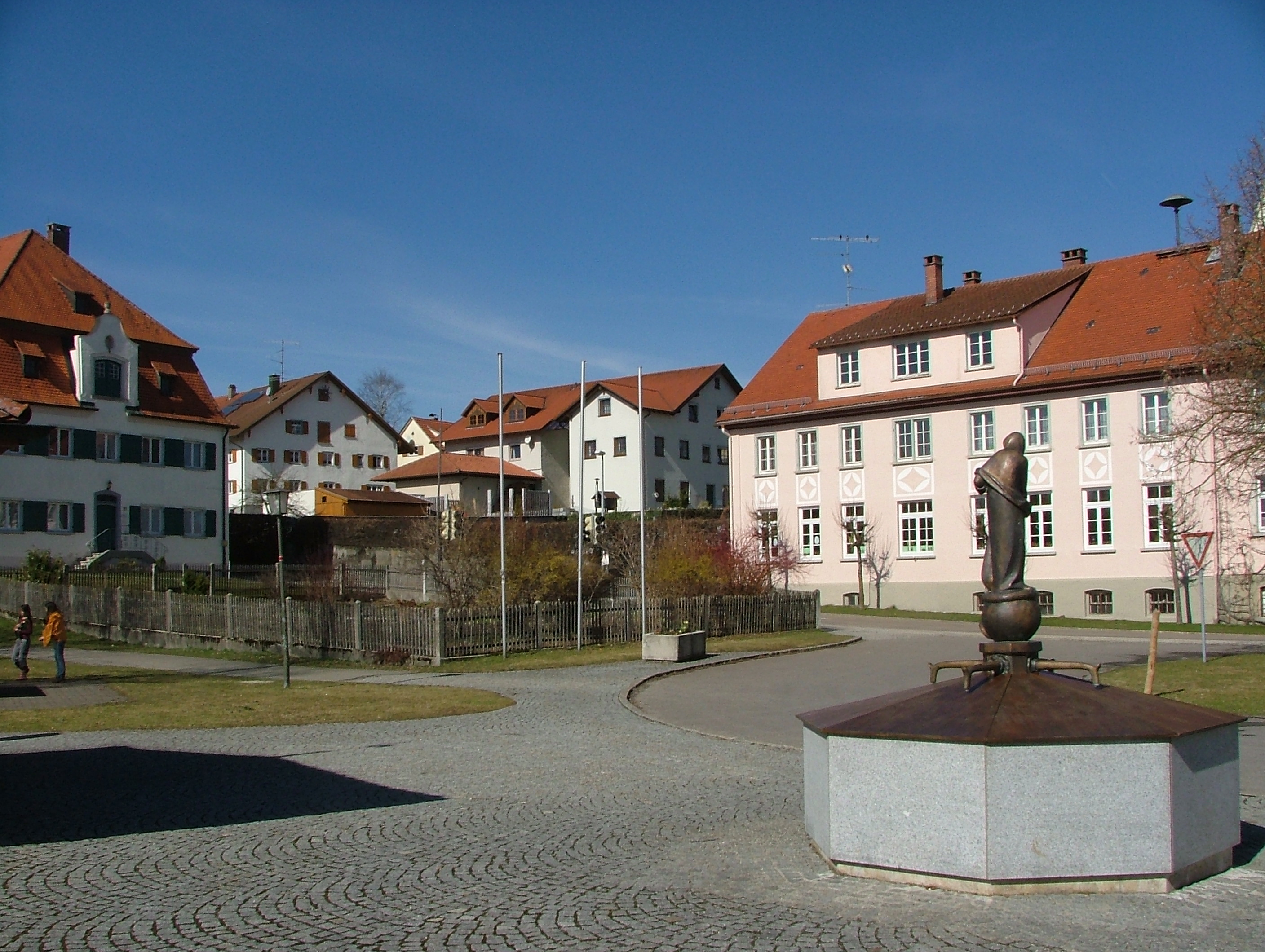
Herlazhofen

Herlazhofen is a village in the South-German region Allgäu. It is part of the town Leutkirch im Allgäu. The population is approximately 1000 inhabitants.
