= Daniele Gabriele =

German footballer

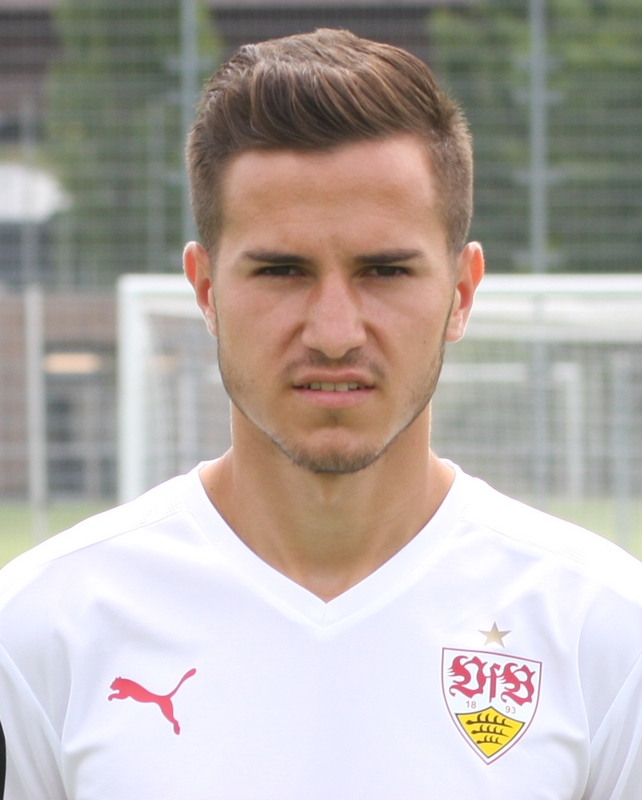
- Gabriele in 2015

Personal information
- Date of birth: 16 December 1994 (age 31)
- Place of birth: Leutkirch im Allgäu, Germany
- Height: 1.79 m (5 ft 10 in)
- Position: Forward

Team information
- Current team: FV Ravensburg
- Number: 10

Youth career
- FC Leutkirch
- 2008–2009: FC Memmingen
- 2009–2013: SC Freiburg

Senior career*
Years	Team	Apps	(Gls)
2012–2015	SC Freiburg II	59	(24)
2015–2017	VfB Stuttgart II	47	(12)
2017–2019	FC Wacker	52	(9)
2019–2020	Carl Zeiss Jena	36	(9)
2020–2021	Türkgücü München	5	(1)
2021	SSV Ulm	22	(4)
2021–2023	TSV Steinbach	38	(9)
2023–2024	FV Illertissen	30	(10)
2024–	FV Ravensburg	62	(28)
- * Club domestic league appearances and goals as of 30 June 2026

Daniele Gabriele (born 16 December 1994) is a German professional footballer who plays as a forward for FV Ravensburg.

Gabriele played his first match for VfB Stuttgart II on 25 July 2015 in the 3. Liga against Dynamo Dresden.
