= Leutkirch im Allgäu =

- Town
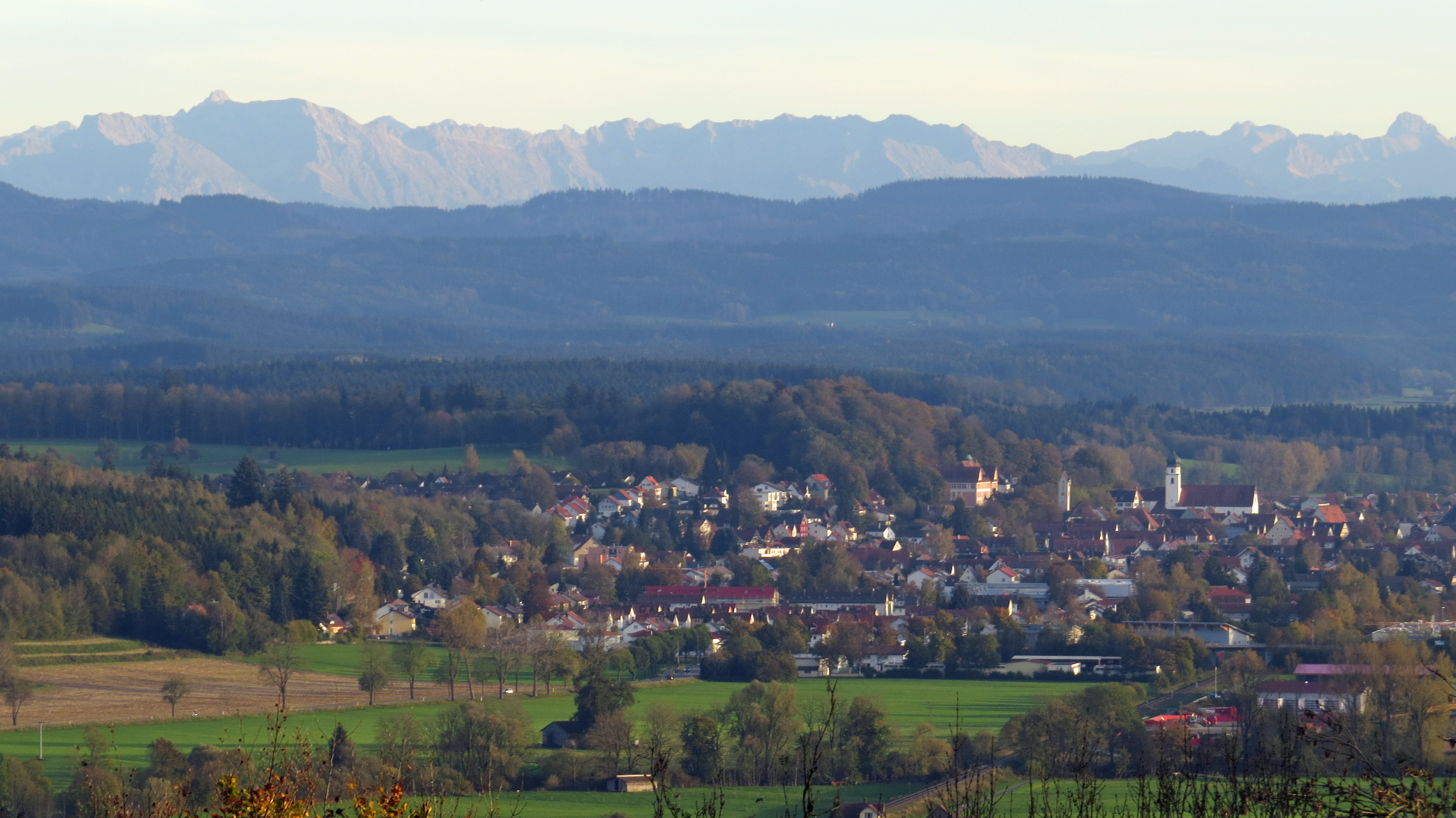
- Leutkirch im Allgäu seen from the north

- Coat of arms

- Location of Leutkirch im Allgäu within Ravensburg district
- Interactive map of Leutkirch im Allgäu
- Location within Germany Location within Baden-Württemberg
- Coordinates: 47°49′32″N 10°1′20″E
- Country: Germany
- State: Baden-Württemberg
- Admin. region: Tübingen
- District: Ravensburg
- Subdivisions: Kernstadt and 8 Stadtteile

Government
  - Mayor (2024–32): Hans-Jörg Henle (Ind.)

Area
  - Total: 174.95 km^{2} (67.55 sq mi)
- Elevation: 654 m (2,146 ft)

Population (2025-12-31)
  - Total: 24,325
  - Density: 139.04/km^{2} (360.11/sq mi)
- Time zone: UTC+01:00 (CET)
  - Summer (DST): UTC+02:00 (CEST)
- Postal codes: 88291–88299
- Dialling codes: 07561
- Vehicle registration: RV
- Website: www.leutkirch.de

Leutkirch im Allgäu (German pronunciation: [ˈlɔʏtkɪʁç ʔɪm ˈʔalɡɔʏ], lit. 'Leutkirch in the Allgäu') is a former Free Imperial City located in south-eastern Baden-Württemberg, Germany. It is part of the district of Ravensburg, in the western Allgäu region and belongs to the administrative region (Regierungsbezirk) of Tübingen. According to the German Meteorological Service, Leutkirch is one of the sunniest cities in Germany.

The name Leutkirch is derived from "Leutekirche" (English: Church of the people), a catholic church in the town which is called "Sankt Martin" today.

Since the municipal reform of 1972, the consolidated Leutkirch urban area comprises the town of Leutkirch im Allgäu itself and the former municipalities of Diepoldshofen, Friesenhofen, Gebrazhofen, Herlazhofen, Hofs, Reichenhofen, Winterstetten and Wuchzenhofen.

== Geography ==
Leutkirch is located in the south of Germany, in the southeast of the state of Baden-Württemberg on the border with Bavaria. The border with Austria and Lake Constance are about 40 km away.

== History ==
=== Early history ===
Very few protohistoric settlement remains have been found in the Allgäu region although a grave dating from the migration period has been found in the Leutkirch area. The area was probably settled by Alemannic tribes before the establishment of the Danube-Iller-Rhine limes during the Roman period.

The town was created with the merger of the villages of Ufhofen and Mittelhofen and vestiges of those settlements were found under the old church of St. Martin. First mention of the church is found in a document of the Abbey of St. Gall dating back to 766. After the line of the local lord became extinct, the area was awarded to the counts of Bregenz and of Montfort.

=== Era of the Free Imperial City ===
In 1293, King Adolf of Nassau granted to Leutkirch the right to rule itself according to the Town Code of Lindau (Rechte der Stadt Lindau), thus effectively raising Leutkirch to the status of a Free Imperial City. For a while, the town continued to be ruled by a bailiff (Landvogt) appointed by the king. In 1311, there is mention for the first time of a town council (Rat) whose members are also the town judges. An elected bürgermeister (mayor) chaired the town council from the 15th century. A so-called Committee of Twenty, representing the guilds, was also part of the governing structure. Eventually, the town council was to be composed of a magistrate (Amtmann), two mayors, three secret councillors and nine councillors.

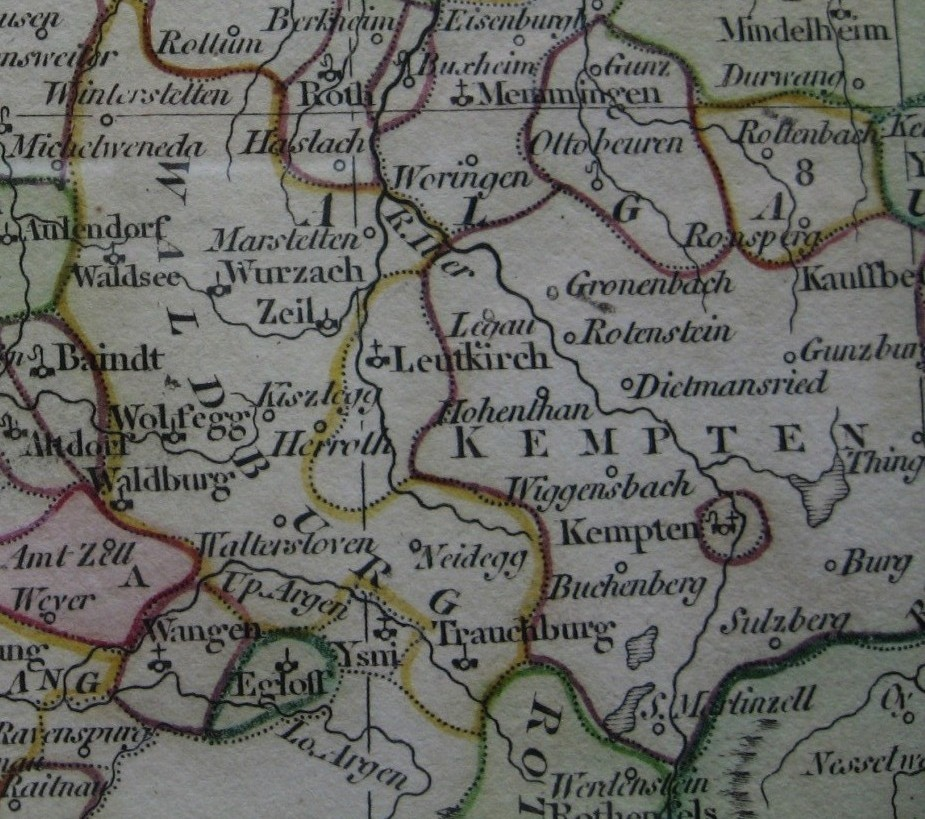
Location of the Free Imperial City in southeastern Swabia

The main industry of the town then was the linen trade and the main weaver guild had a membership of 200 at one time. Their linen production was exported to Italy and Spain mostly. Leutkirch became a member of the Swabian League in 1488 and gained a seat and vote both in the League and in the Imperial Diet (Reichstag).

Like the majority of the other Free Imperial Cities, Leutkirch went through considerable internal strife during the Protestant Reformation. The town, officially Lutheran in 1546, adhered to the Augsburg Confession and later joined the Schmalkaldic League. There was a fierce dispute for several years between the Protestant magistrates of the town and the abbot of Weingarten Abbey for control over St. Martin’s parish church whose patron was the abbot. A compromise was reached in 1562: the Catholics kept the parish church while the Protestants took over the hospital’s church, which was expanded in 1589 and is now known as Memorial Church. Catholics therefore maintained a foothold and some rights in the Protestant city. In 1577 Leutkirch joined other Lutheran Free Imperial Cities in signing the Formula of Concord.

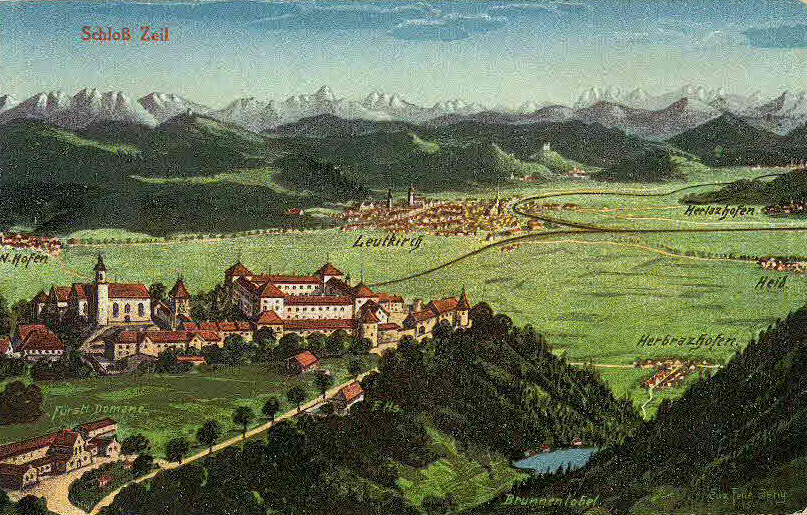
Schloss Zeil overlooking Leutkirch, circa 1900. The palace of the counts of Waldburg was built just outside the territory of the Free Imperial City.

The town suffered heavily during the Thirty Years' War and the number of inhabitants fell drastically. The post-war period was not easy as well and the debt of the town continued to increase. However, difficult economic times did not prevent the town's rulers from having a new baroque town hall (rathaus) built in 1740. The stucco ceiling by Johannes Schütz remains one of the main attractions of the town. From the Peace of Westphalia onward, Leutkirch was to remain one of the smallest and least conspicuous of the 50 Free Imperial Cities of the Empire.

=== End of the Free Imperial City of Leutkirch ===
In the course of the mediatisation of 1802-03, Leutkirch was not spared the fate of the great majority of the 50 Free Imperial Cities of the moribund Holy Roman Empire and lost its independence. The town was first annexed to the Duchy (later Kingdom) of Bavaria in 1803 before becoming part of the Kingdom of Württemberg in 1810.

=== The Free Men of the Leutkircher Heath ===
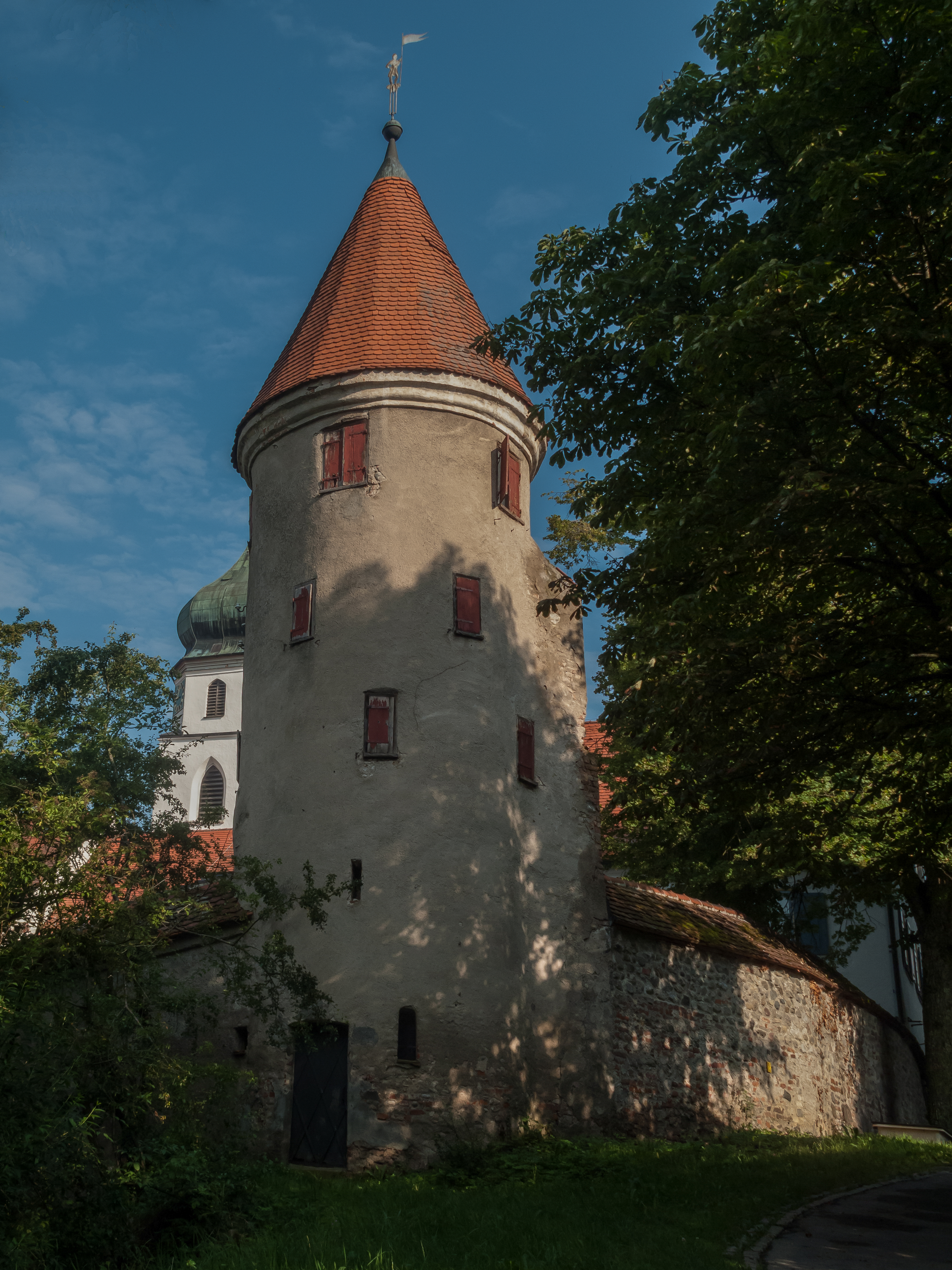
Tower (der Pulverturm) with church (die Sankt Martins Kirche) in background

All of the countryside surrounding the Free Imperial City of Leutkirch except on the northwest was designated a Free Imperial Village possessing Imperial Immediacy. This territory was known as the Free Men of the Leutkircher Heath (Freien auf Leutkircher Heide). By 1800, the Free Men were only one of five Imperial villages still remaining. It shared the fate of the City of Leutkirch and was occupied by Bavarian troops in 1803.

== Immigration ==
The 2011 census determined that 1,438 people, or 6.6% of the residents in Leutkirch, do not hold German citizenship. Of these people, 1,307 come from other European countries, 93 from Asia, 15 from Africa and 23 from North and South America. The largest immigration groups come from Turkey (440 people), Italy (175), Kosovo (98), Austria (86) and Bosnia & Herzegovina (65).

== Religion ==
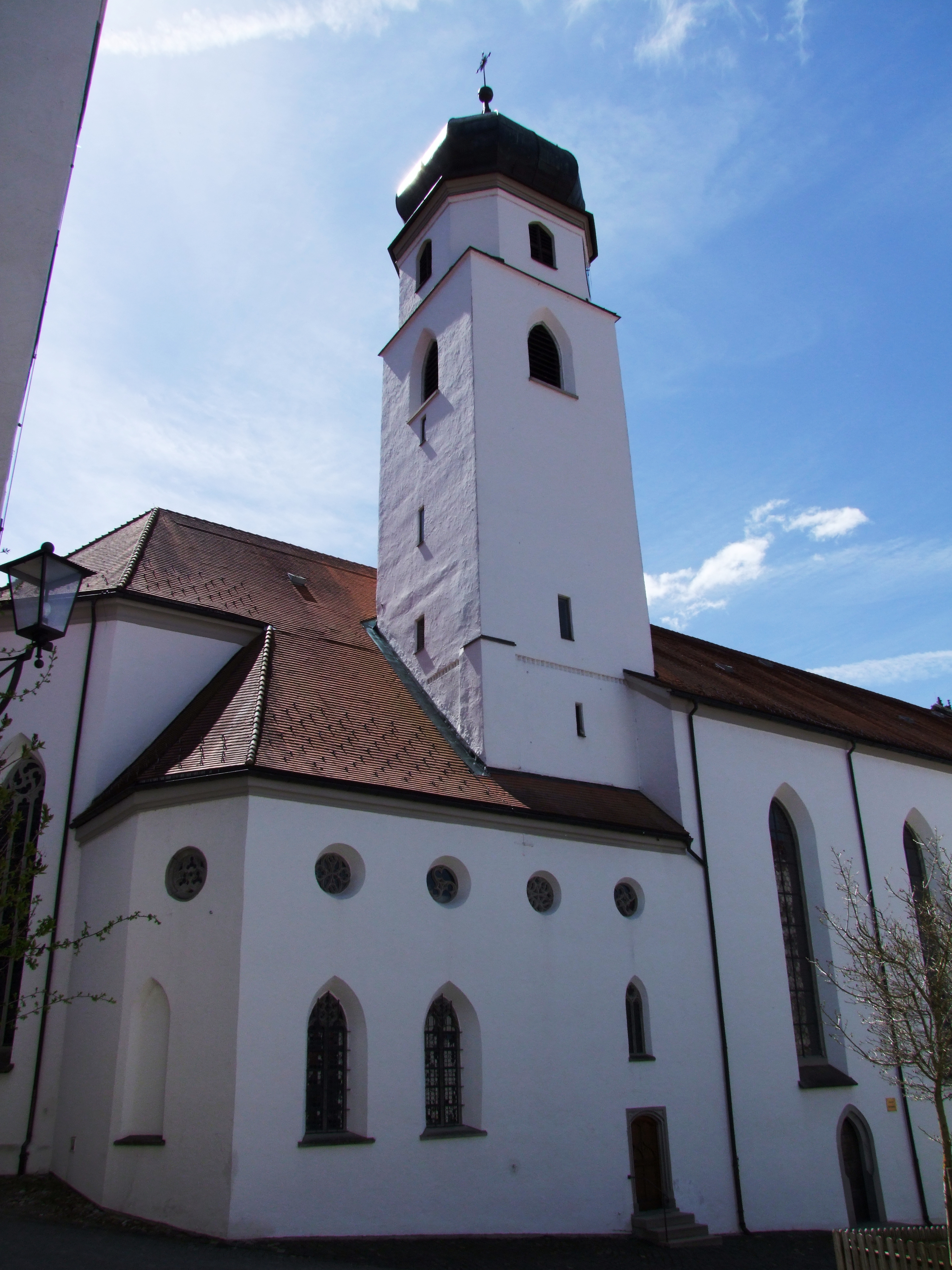
The late Gothic St. Martin's Church built in the early 16th. century. The onion dome was added in 1814.

According to the 2011 census, 70.3% of Leutkirch residents were Catholic, 12.3% Protestant, 0.8% Orthodox, and the rest belonged to other religious communities or none at all.

== Politics ==
Hans-Jörg Henle has been the mayor of Leutkirch since 2008. He does not belong to any political party.

In the 2025 federal elections in Germany, the conservative Christian Democratic "CDU" ranked highest in Leutkirch with 36.6% of votes. With 22.0%, the right-wing populist "AfD" came in second, and the green ecological party "Die Grünen" came in third with 11.4%.

In the 2021 state elections in Baden-Württemberg, the conservative Christian Democratic "CDU" was the most successful party in Leutkirch with 36.8% of votes. Second came the green ecological "Die Grünen" with 28.5%, followed by the right-wing populist "AfD" with 9.4%.

=== Twin towns ===
Leutkirch im Allgäu is twinned with:

- Bédarieux, France, since 1982
- Hérépian, France, since 1982
- Lamalou-les-Bains, France, since 1982
- Castiglione delle Stiviere, Italy, since 1995

== Transport ==
Leutkirch is located on the federal highway 96, which leads from Lindau to Munich. The B 465 completes the connection to the federal road network.

The city is the initial point of the Leutkirch-Memmingen railway. The train station Leutkirch is located on the railroad lines Herbertingen-Isny and Leutkirch-Memmingen. The town can be reached daily at two-hour intervals (in the morning and in the afternoon sometimes also hourly).

The town is connected by several bus lines with Isny and Bad Wurzach, among others, and belongs to the Bodensee-Oberschwaben Verkehrsverbund (bodo). The Leutkirch city bus operates within Leutkirch.

== Tourism ==
=== Center Parcs ===
Center Parcs Europe has opened a vacation park in Leutkirch. On 27 September 2009, a majority of Leutkirch residents voted in favour of the project in a referendum. At the end of 2015, it was announced that the financing of the 250 million euro project had been secured; approximately 1,000 vacation homes and a large covered center with stores, restaurants, entertainment facilities and a large bathing and spa area were to be built by the end of 2018. In the end, the concept was adapted and enlarged. The construction costs thus rose to about 350 million. Center Parcs Park Allgäu has been open to guests since the end of October 2018.

=== Museum im Bock ===
The Museum im Bock local history museum displays exhibits in relation to the town's and craftsmen's history.

=== Schloss Zeil ===
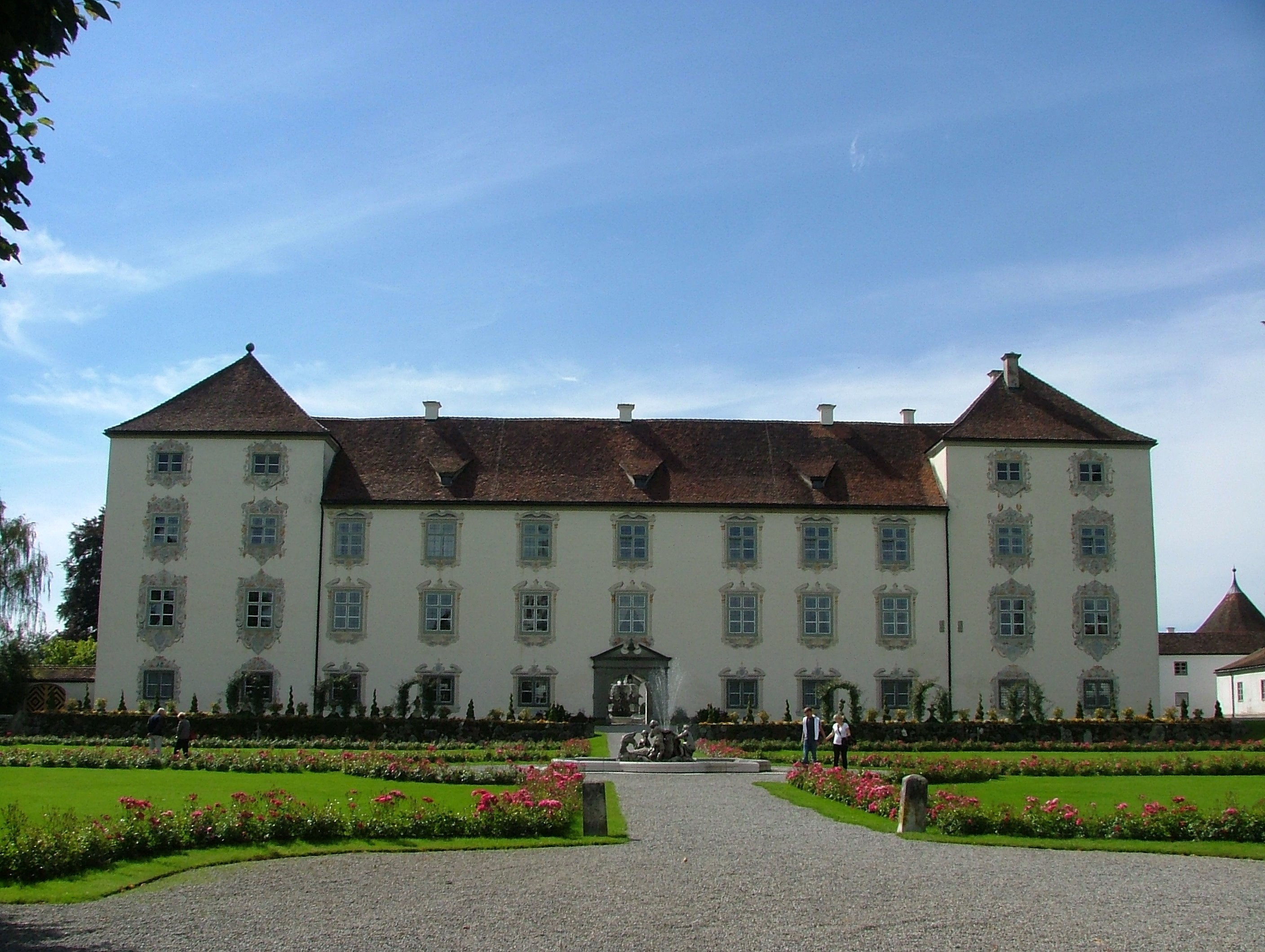
Schloss Zeil (Zeil Castle)

Schloss Zeil (Zeil Castle) is located five kilometers away from the core city on a hill above the village of Unterzeil. The Renaissance building can only be visited from the outside. The parish church of St. Maria, which belongs to the castle complex, is freely accessible.

In 1598, Truchsess Froben von Waldburg-Zeil had the medieval Zeil Castle demolished and in 1599 began construction of the present Renaissance castle. Construction dragged on until his death in 1614. As a supporter of the Counter-Reformation, Truchsess Froben had the church and monastery (Hauskloster) built first, and the castle after. He also ordered daily high mass, solemn praise of God and mass for the dead resting in the crypt.

== Notable people ==
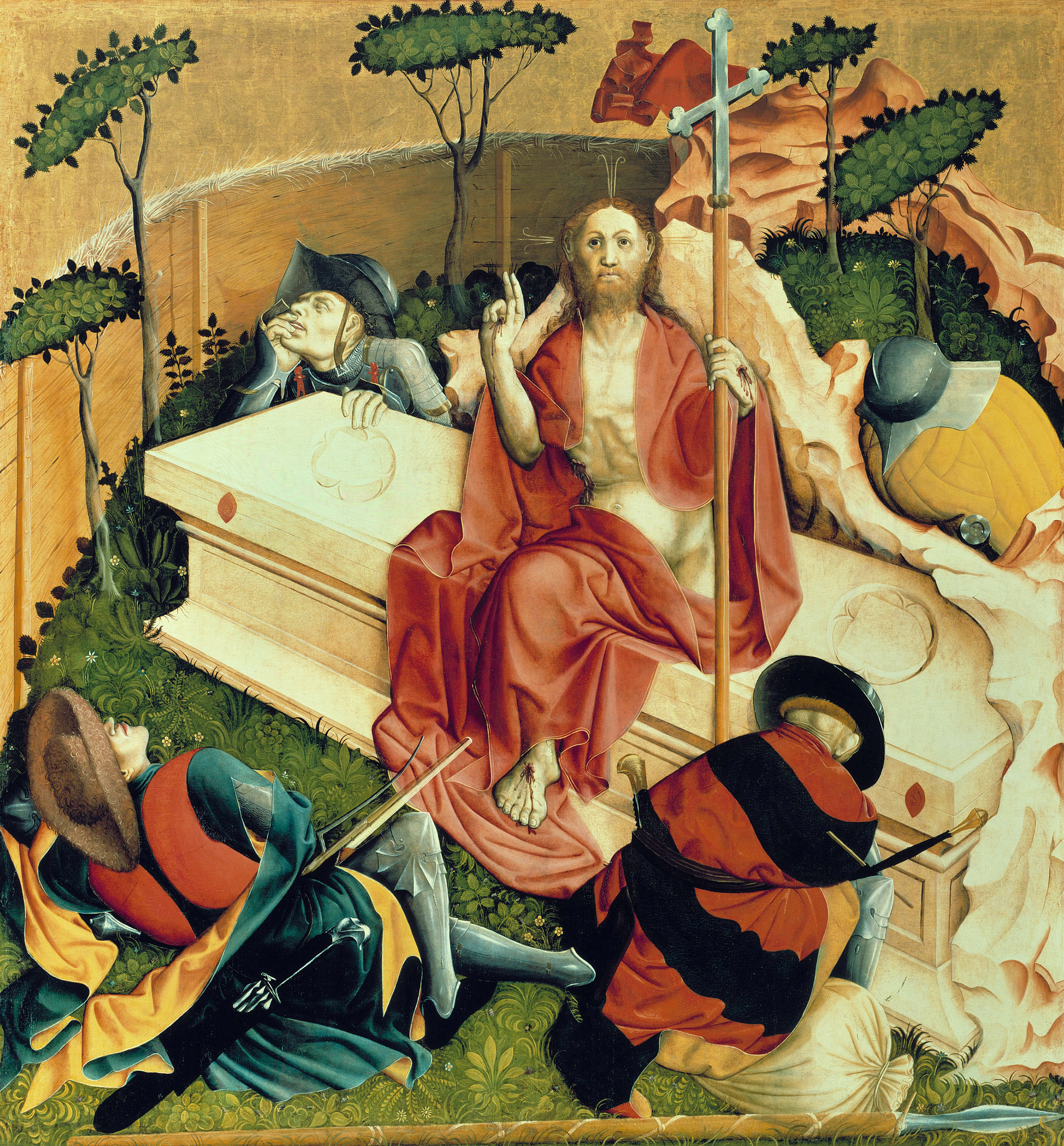
painting by Hans Multscher, 1437

- Hans Multscher (ca. 1400–1467), sculptor and painter.
- Inge Scholl (1917–1998), members of the White Rose student resistance movement, died locally.
- Otl Aicher (1922–1991), graphic designer and typographer, lived and worked locally
- Georg Moser (1923–1988), Catholic Bishop of Rottenburg-Stuttgart.
- Alois Graf von Waldburg-Zeil (1933–2014), CDU politician, member of the Bundestag, 1980 to 1998.
- Elke Maravilha (1945–2016), Brazilian actress, model and television personality
- Willi Halder (1958-2025), politician (The Greens)
- Peter Nick (born 1962), molecular biologist
- Gunther Hartmann (born 1966), immunologist and clinical pharmacologist.
- Rainer W. Bussmann (born 1967), ethnobotanist and vegetation ecologist

=== Sport ===
- Gerd Riss (born 1965), a former champion speedway rider.
- Heiko Butscher (born 1980), footballer and manager
- Daniele Gabriele (born 1994), footballer who has played over 290 games
- Fabian Menig (born 1994), footballer who has played over 260 games
