= Hans Multscher =

German sculptor and painter

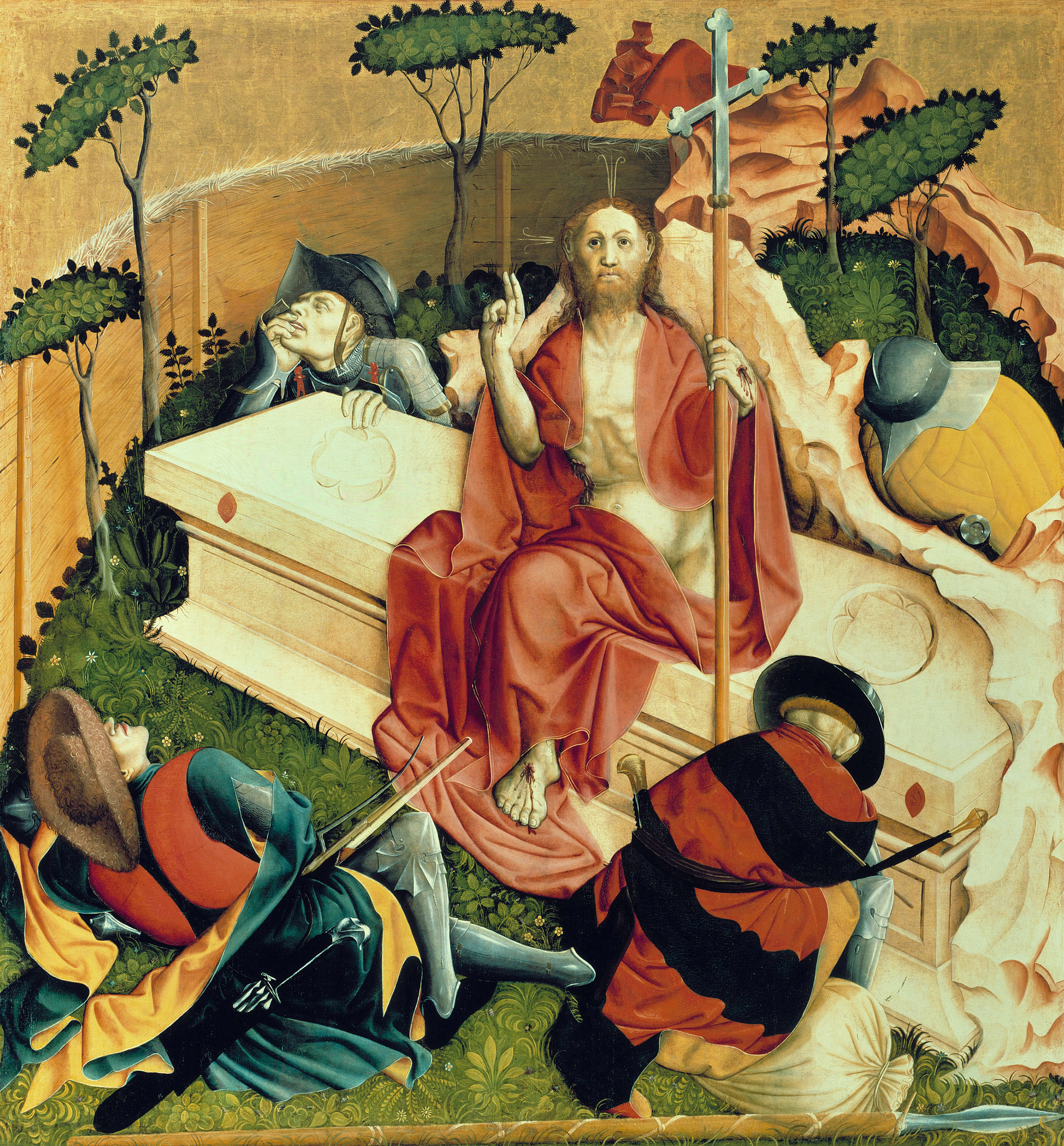
- Die Auferstehung Christi, Gemäldegalerie, Berlin
- Born: ca. 1400; Reichenhofen (today Leutkirch im Allgäu)
- Died: 1467; Ulm
- Known for: bringing realism to German art, replacing International Gothic

Hans Multscher (ca. 1400–1467) was a German sculptor and painter.

Multscher was born in Reichenhofen (today Leutkirch im Allgäu).

He made himself acquainted with new artistic styles from northern France and the Netherlands, and became a free citizen of the city of Ulm in 1427. There, he married Adelheid Kitzin the same year. He ran his own business as a painter and sculptor, together with his brother Heinrich Multscher.

Multscher died in Ulm.

== Works ==
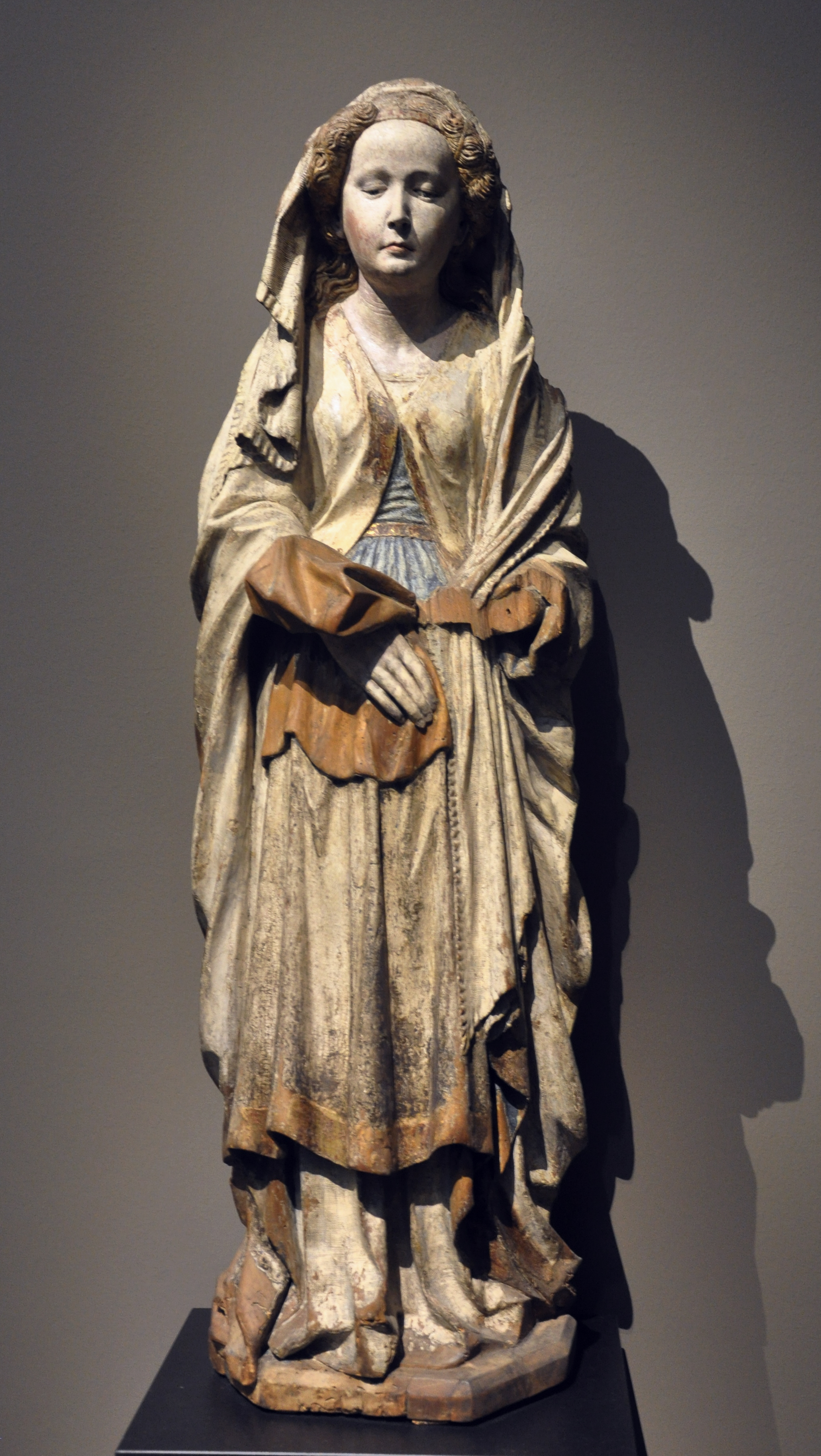
Holy Mary Magdalen by Hans Multscher, Liebieghaus in Frankfurt am Main

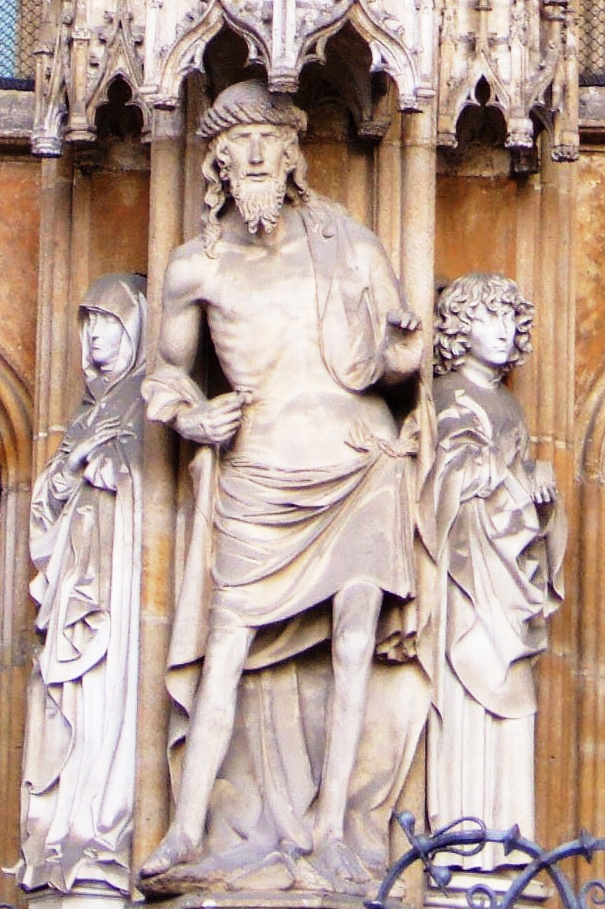
Man of sorrows (copy), central column of the western portal of Ulm Minster

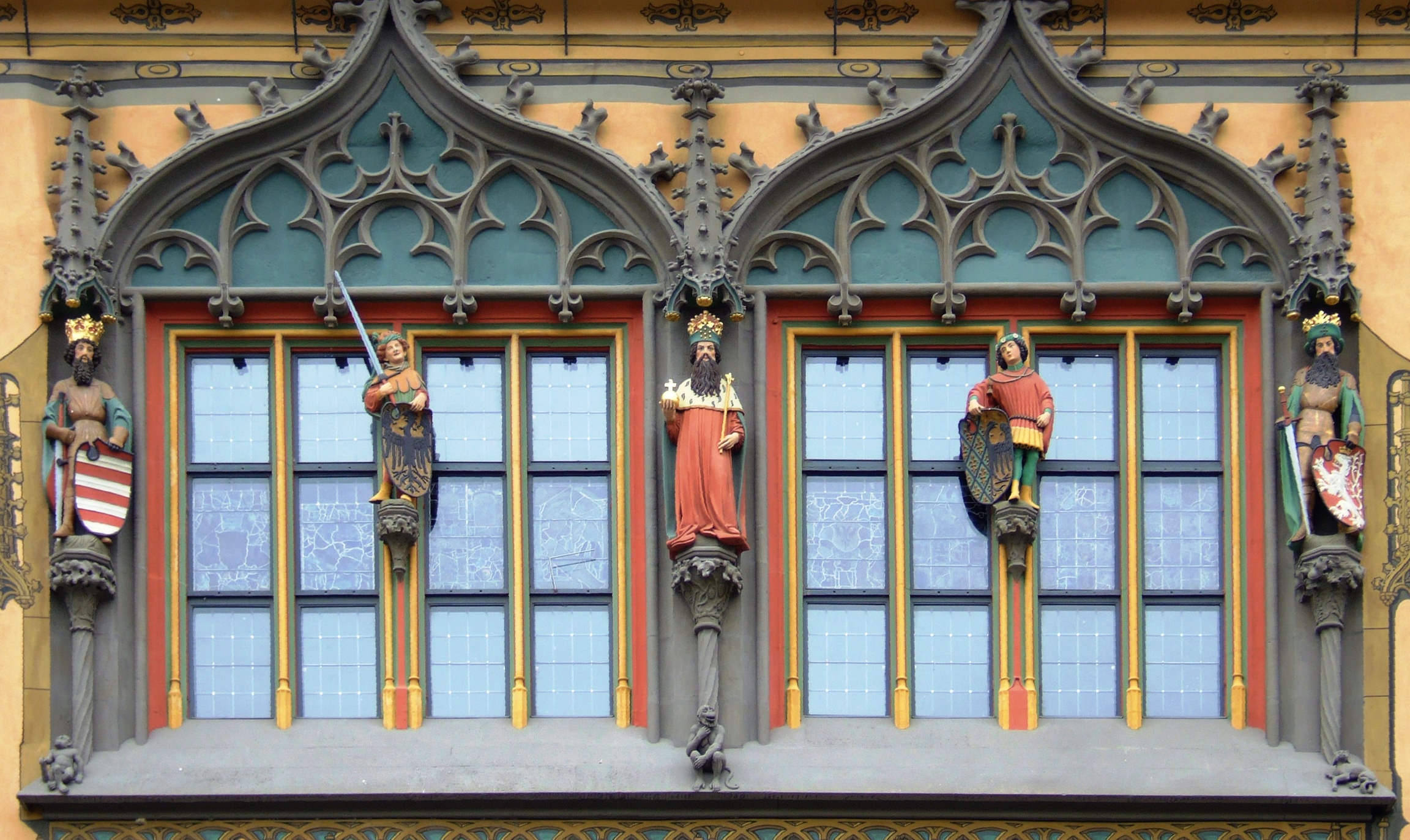
Group of emperors, eastern window of the city hall of Ulm, Hans Multscher, 1527–1533

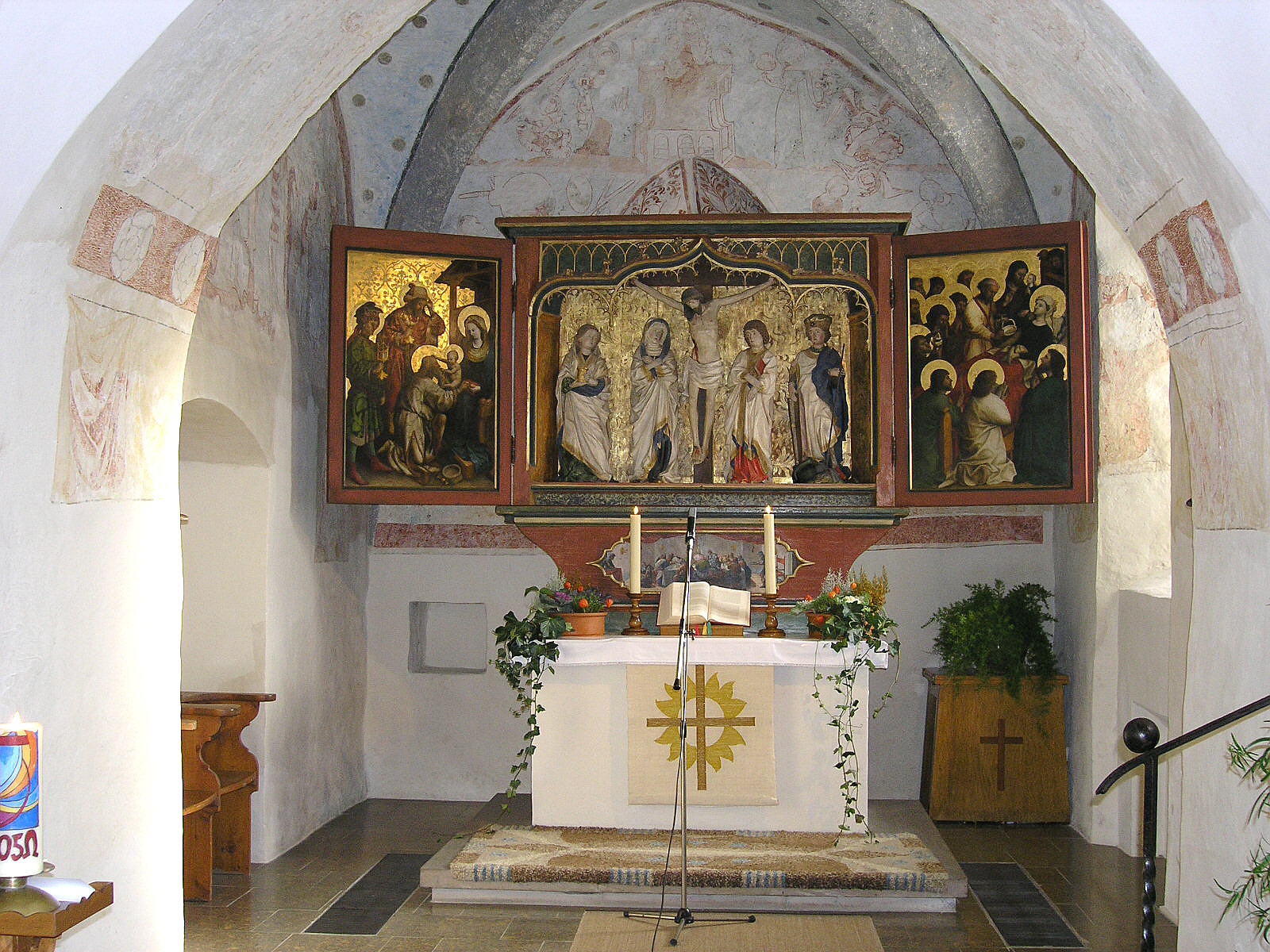
Side altar of the Multscher School in the Parish Church of Scharenstetten (originally in Ulm Minster)

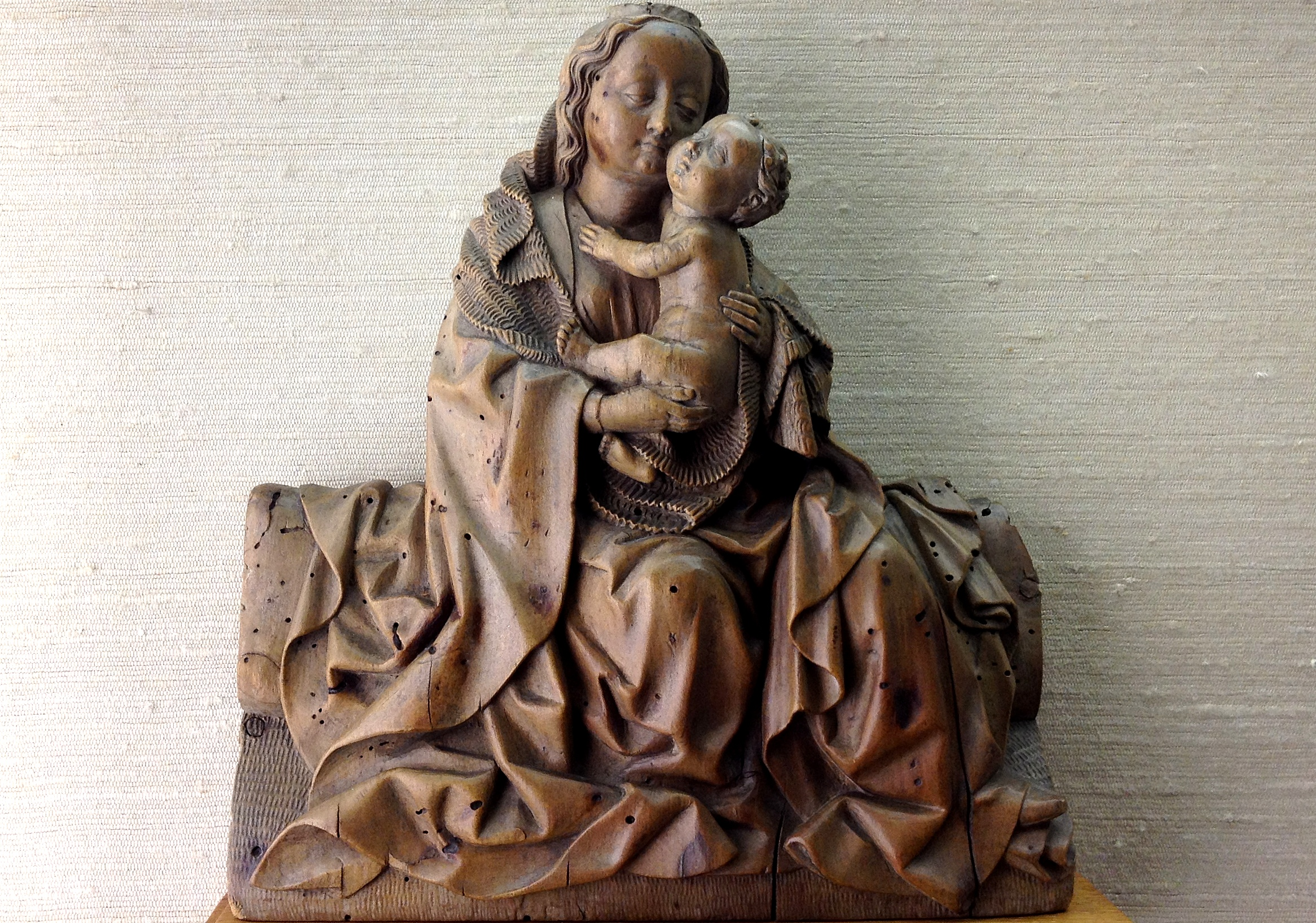
Madonna and Child, from Multscher's atelier, 1450, Mainfränkisches Museum, Würzburg
