= Eberhard Schäfer (scientist) =

German plant physiologist

Eberhard Schäfer (born 23 June 1945) is a German plant biologist and professor emeritus at the University of Freiburg. He is recognized for his contributions to the study of phytochromes, light perception in plants, and photomorphogenesis. His work has combined experimental biology with mathematical modeling and has contributed to the understanding of plant light signaling pathways, including photoreceptor-mediated nuclear import and thermal sensing in plants.

== Early life and education ==
Eberhard Schäfer was born in Thuringia, East Germany, and grew up in Lower Saxony and later in Duisburg, where his father worked in the oil trade. Initially interested in medicine and the physical sciences, Schäfer studied physics and mathematics at the University of Freiburg. After completing his Diplom (equivalent to a master’s degree) in physics in 1969 he transitioned into biology, with an interest in photobiology. He began his doctoral research in the laboratory of Hans Mohr at the University of Freiburg. Schäfer’s PhD work focused on in vivo spectroscopy of phytochrome using the Ratiospect device, a semi-automated photometric system. He completed his doctorate in 1971 and was offered a permanent research position shortly thereafter.

== Academic career ==
Schäfer established an independent research group at Freiburg and received his habilitation in 1975. In 1995 he was appointed as a full professor, succeeding Hans Mohr. He has held sabbatical appointments at institutions including with Winslow Briggs in the Carnegie Institute at Stanford and with Masaki Furuya at the RIKEN Institute in Japan.

== Research contributions ==
Schäfer’s research spans multiple domains of plant photobiology:

=== Phytochrome kinetics and mathematical modeling ===
- Developed mathematical models describing the kinetics of phytochrome action, including continuous light responses (High Irradiance Response, HIR).
- Demonstrated the temperature dependence of phytochrome dark reversion, contributing to later research showing that phytochrome B (phyB) functions as a thermosensor.

=== Nuclear import of phytochromes ===
- In collaboration with Ferenc Nagy identified and characterized the light-dependent nuclear import of phytochromes (types A–E), which helped link photoreception at the plasma membrane or cytosol to nuclear gene expression.
- Collaborated with Ferenc Nagy and others to demonstrate how post-translational modification of phytochromes modifies intracellular localization dynamics and signaling.

=== UV-B photoreception ===
- Collaborated with Klaus Hahlbrock and later with Roman Ulm and Ferenc Nagy among others on the mechanisms of UV-B perception.
- Contributed to the identification and characterization of UVR8 as a specific UV-B photoreceptor.

== Honors and memberships ==
- Member of the German National Academy of Sciences Leopoldina (since 2001).
- Recognized as an ASPB Pioneer Member by the American Society of Plant Biologists
