= Tiefenbronn =

German municipality

- Municipality
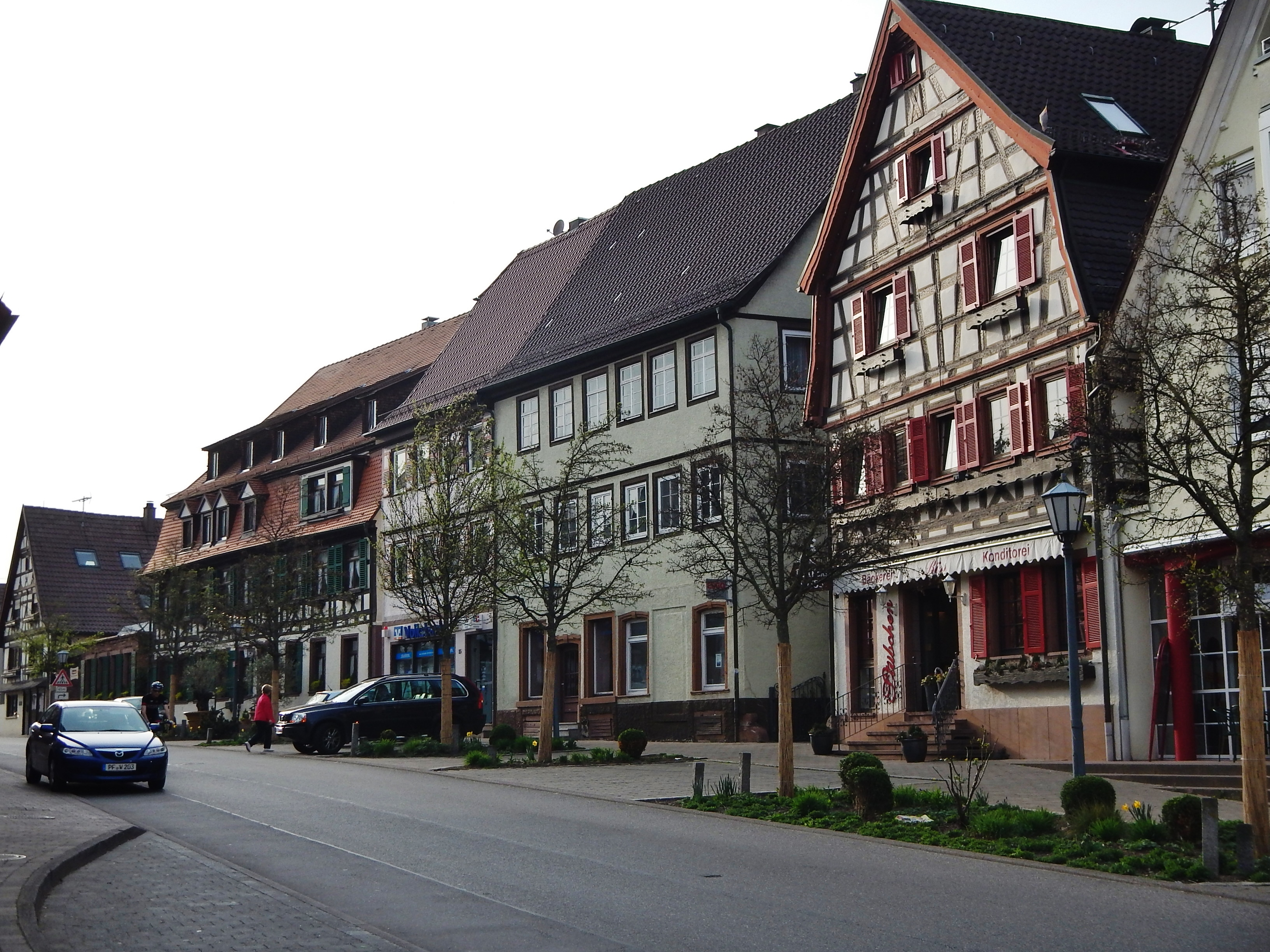
- Franz-Josef Gall Strasse

- Coat of arms

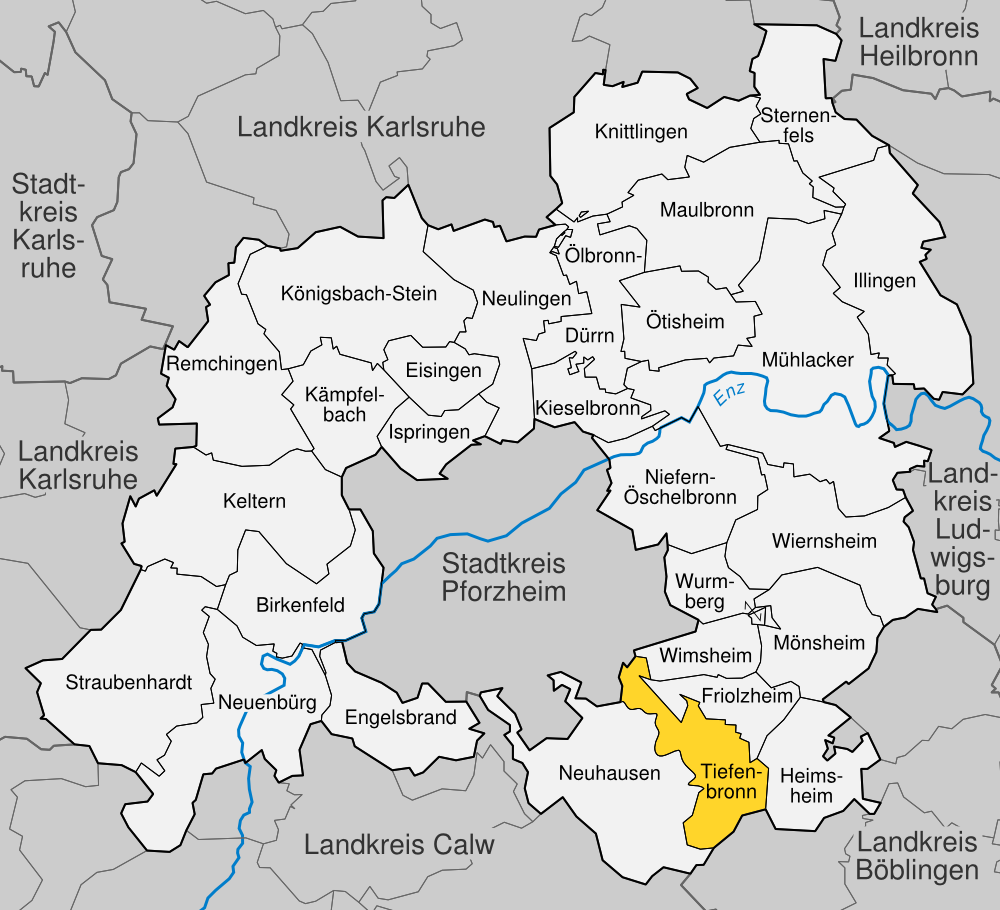
- Location of Tiefenbronn within Enzkreis district
- Interactive map of Tiefenbronn
- Location within Germany Location within Baden-Württemberg
- Coordinates: 48°49′27″N 8°48′1″E
- Country: Germany
- State: Baden-Württemberg
- Admin. region: Karlsruhe
- District: Enzkreis

Area
  - Total: 14.78 km^{2} (5.71 sq mi)
- Elevation: 428 m (1,404 ft)

Population (2025-12-31)
  - Total: 5,346
  - Density: 361.7/km^{2} (936.8/sq mi)
- Time zone: UTC+01:00 (CET)
  - Summer (DST): UTC+02:00 (CEST)
- Postal codes: 75233
- Dialling codes: 07234
- Vehicle registration: PF
- Website: www.tiefenbronn.de

Tiefenbronn (German pronunciation: [ˈtiːfn̩bʁɔn]) is a municipality in the Enz district of Baden-Württemberg, Germany.

== History ==
In 1806, Tiefenbronn became a possession of the Grand Duchy of Baden at the expense of the House of Gemmingen. It was first assigned to the district of Pforzheim in 1806 and remained in the larger city's jurisdiction until the Landkreis Pforzheim, created on 25 June 1939, was dissolved in 1972. On 1 January 1973, as part of 1973 Baden-Württemberg district reform, Tiefenbronn was assigned to the newly created Enz district.

== Geography ==
The municipality (Gemeinde) of Tiefenbronn covers 14.79 square kilometers (5.71 sq mi) of the Enzkreis, a district of Baden-Württemberg, Germany. It is located on the edge of the Black Forest and the Upper Gäu. The buntsandstein of the Röt Formation, under the Black Forest, extends into the municipal area from the west as far east as the border with Heimsheim. North and south of the buntsandstein are the wooded and karstified hills of muschelkalk of the Heckengäu. The main watercourse is the Würm, a tributary of the Enz that flows through Tiefenbronn in several meanders. The lowest elevation above sea level, 325 meters (1,066 ft) Normalnull (NN), is found where the Würm forms the border with Pforzheim. The highest elevation is 526 meters (1,726 ft) NN, on the northern slope of the Büchelberg.

== Coat of arms ==
Tiefenbronn's coat of arms displays a golden well with the bucket drawn up on green ground upon a field of blue. The well's usage as a symbol of the town dates to 1721, but was not made official until 1966, when the municipal pattern and tincture were decided with the advice of the Karlsruhe General State Archives. This coat of arms was approved by the Federal Ministry of the Interior on 30 March 1966 again on 15 February 1979 by the Enz district office after the merging of Lehningen and Mühlhausen into Tiefenbronn in 1972.
