= Jermy =

Jermy is a surname. Notable people with the surname include:

- Clive Jermy (1932–2014), British botanist
- Isaac Jermy, two Stanfield Hall murder victims by this name
- Louise Jermy (1877–1952), British domestic servant and autobiographer
- Robert Jermy, one of the owners of Bayfield Hall, a historical country house in Norfolk, England
- John Jermy (1496-
- Seth Jermy (1653–1724), Royal Navy officer
- Terry Jermy (born 1985), British politician who has been the Member of Parliament (MP) for the South West Norfolk constituency since 2024

Several people also have a middle name Jermy:

- Arthur Jermy Mounteney Jephson (1859–1908), English explorer
- Richard John Philip Jermy Gwyn (1934–2020), Canadian writer

== See also ==
- Jermy baronets, a title in the Baronetage of England
- Jeremy (given name)
