= Alfred Jodrell =

Sir Alfred Jodrell, Bt

High Sheriff of Norfolk
- In office 1887–1887
- Preceded by: William Morris
- Succeeded by: Michael Stocks

Personal details
- Born: 13 August 1847 Horham Hall, Thaxted
- Died: 15 March 1929 (aged 81)
- Spouse: Lady Jane Grimston (m. 1897; died 1920)
- Relations: Sir Edward Bowyer-Smijth, 10th Baronet (grandfather)
- Parent(s): Edward Jodrell; Adela Moncton Bowyer-Smijth

Sir Alfred Jodrell, 4th Baronet (13 August 1847 – 15 March 1929) was the fourth and last of the Jodrell Baronets, assuming the title in 1882.

== Early life ==
Jodrell was born on 13 August 1847 at Horham Hall, Thaxted. He was the son of Edward Jodrell, a Captain in the 16th Regiment, and Adela Moncton Bowyer-Smijth (1823–1896).

His paternal grandfather was Edward Jodrell (brother of Sir Richard Paul Jodrell, 2nd Baronet and Henry Jodrell, MP for Great Yarmouth and Bramber, all sons of classical scholar and playwright Richard Paul Jodrell) and the former Mary Lowndes-Stone. His grandfather Edward inherited Bayfield Hall from his brother, Henry. His maternal grandparents were Sir Edward Bowyer-Smijth, 10th Baronet, and the former Laetitia Cecily Weyland, the youngest daughter of John Weyland.

== Career ==
He founded The Shell Museum in Glandford, near his Norfolk home at Bayfield Hall, to house his collection accumulated over six decades. He was a noted public benefactor, restoring old churches, such as St Nicholas, Blakeney, sending provisions to the Norfolk & Norwich Hospital, and rebuilding and administering his estates and other local buildings, such as the watermill. He was High Sheriff of Norfolk in 1887.

== Personal life ==
On 25 February 1897, Jodrell married Lady Jane Grimston (1848–1920), daughter of James Grimston, 2nd Earl of Verulam, and the former Elizabeth Joanna Weyland (daughter of Richard Weyland). They resided at Bayfield Hall, Norfolk.

Sir Alfred died on 15 March 1929 upon which the title became extinct.

Baronetage of Great Britain
Preceded by Edward Repps Jodrell	Baronet (of Salle Park); 1882–1929	Extinct
