= Norwich School (disambiguation) =

Norwich School is an independent fee-paying school in Norwich, England.

Norwich School may also refer to:

- Norwich School of Painters, 19th century provincial art movement in Britain
- Norwich School (glassmakers), mediaeval Norwich-based community of stained glass makers
- Norwich University of the Arts, formerly Norwich School of Art & Design in Norwich, England
- Norwich High School for Girls, independent girls fee-charging school with selective entry in Norwich, England
- Norwich High School for Boys, short-lived independent school, that became the Langley School, Norfolk, England
- City of Norwich School, secondary comprehensive school situated in Norwich, England
- Norwich Law School, part of the UEA in Norwich, England
- Norwich High School, located at Midland Drive in Norwich, New York, United States of America
