= John Craske =

English artist (1881–1943)

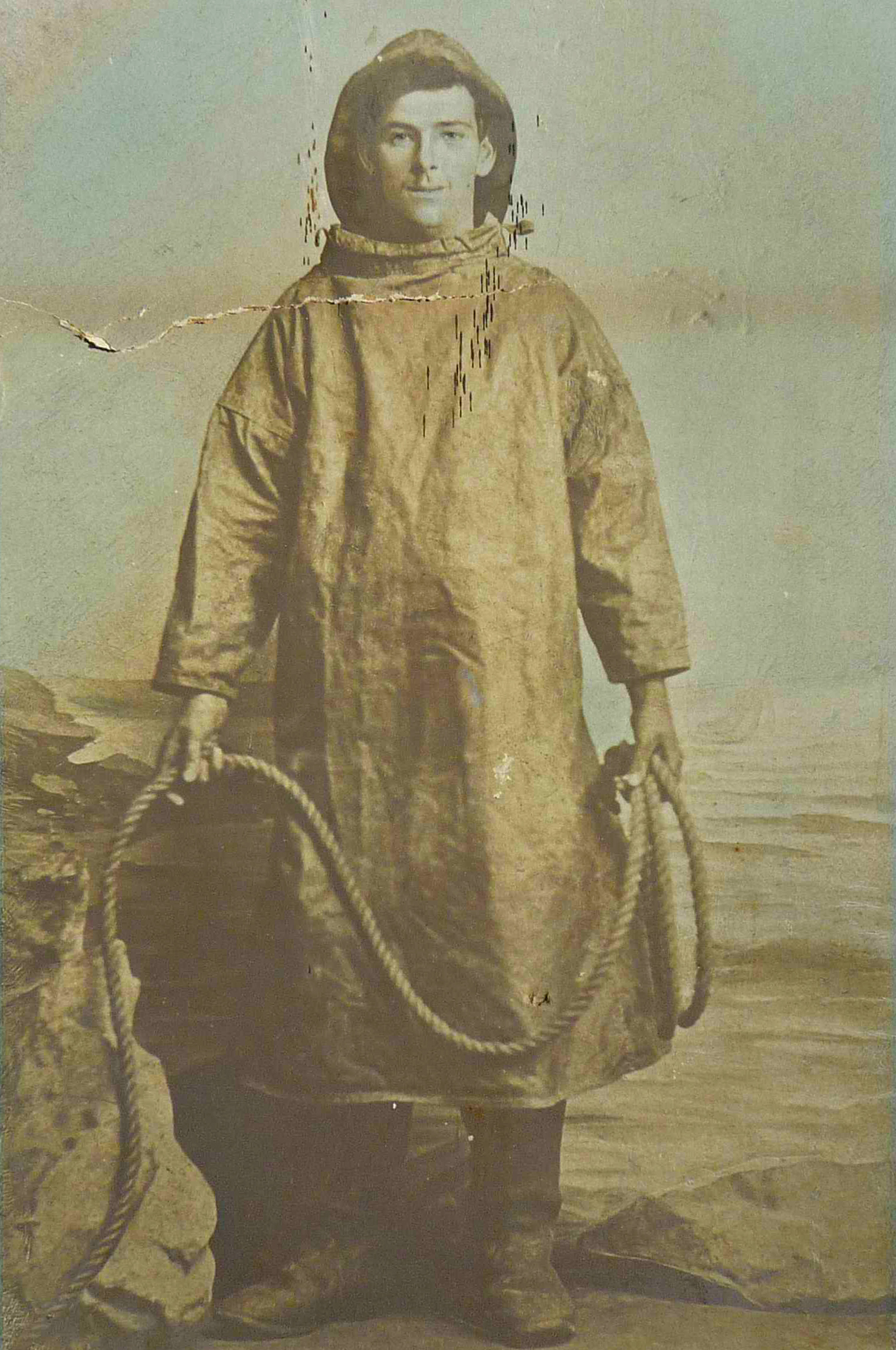
- Portrait of John Craske in fishing garb around 1901
- Born: 6 July 1881; Lower Sheringham
- Died: 26 August 1943 (aged 62); Dereham
- Notable work: Lowestoft Fleet, Beach Scene, Panorama of the Norfolk Coast, Evacuation of Dunkirk
- Style: embroidery, 'painting in wools'
- Spouse(s): Laura Craske, née Eke
- Memorial: Blue plaque on the shop that was the family fish shop on Norwich Street in Dereham

John Craske (6 July 1881 – 26 August 1943) was an English artist who, without formal training, painted and later worked with coloured threads to create embroideries. Craske started working life as a deep sea fisherman sailing out of Grimsby, and later ran fish shops in Norfolk. Following a breakdown during World War I, he was discharged from military service and returned to Norfolk, where he took up painting and embroidery in his forties for health reasons. His artwork attracted the attention of British and American collectors and was exhibited in Norfolk, London, and the United States.

== Early life ==
John Craske was born on 6 July 1881 in the fishing community in Lower Sheringham, north Norfolk. He was the third of five sons and four daughters born to John Gladden and Mary Craske. His father was a deep sea fisherman. The family moved to Grimsby where Craske went to school until the age of 14 when he was expected to join his brothers on long, cold, gruelling and dangerous expeditions trawling for fish on sail-powered smacks (a contemporary studio photograph of Craske shows a young fisherman holding a length of fake paper rope, taken to leave some record in case he drowned). From the 1890s, steam trawlers became more prevalent, being able to travel longer distances and get the catch back to port more quickly. As a result, the sailing smacks were no longer competitive and the Craske family moved inland, to Dereham, in 1905. The family set up a fish business at 1 Wellington Road in Dereham selling wet and smoked fish and delivering fish to the surrounding villages with a white pony.

A member of the Salvation Army based in St Nicholas Street, just around the corner from this shop, Craske sang with the Salvation Army choir in the market place in Dereham. Here he met Laura Eke with whom he shared deep religious convictions. Laura was a member of the Primitive Methodist Chapel on Commercial Road, Dereham, where they were married on 22 July 1908.

The couple moved initially to Swanton Morley where Craske ran his fish round with two ponies and a pannier on each. However, as fresh fish from Lowestoft had to be collected from North Elmham railway station, in December 1909, they moved to North Elmham. Craske built the business by working from 6am to 11pm and took no holidays. One day a week he collected fish from Lowestoft docks for his father's fish shop where they did all their own fish curing and smoking. He was very energetic and business-like and never took a day off.

While Craske was out on his rounds, Laura did the curing - smoked haddock, codling, cod roe, sprats, herring and whiting; kippered herring and mackerel and bloated herring. She also boiled crabs, lobsters, crayfish, winkles and oysters, cranking the water up from a well on a chain. The winter was harsh, working with ice and salt.

The 1911 United Kingdom census on 2 April recorded John, 29, and Laura, 28, living at Chapel Street, North Elmham, where Craske was recorded as a 'fish merchant', with George Baker employed as a 'fish hawker'. In Kelly's Directory of 1912, John Craske is listed at North Elmham as Craske & Son, fishmongers.

In 1914 they left North Elmham and returned to Dereham where they rented 42 Norwich Road. Laura hoped Craske would not have to work so hard and he continued his hawking from the house. Laura ran the smoke house for her father-in-law and for Craske's business.

== World War I ==
In 1914, when World War I began, Craske was exempted from active service, rated C2 at his first test.

In January 1916, when Kelly's Directory listed Craske as a 'fish curer' at 42 Norwich Road, East Dereham, the Military Service Act was introduced to help fill the ranks, introducing compulsory conscription for the first time in Britain's history. Every unmarried man and childless widower between 18 and 41 was offered three choices:

- enlist at once,
- attest at once - under the Derby Scheme, or
- on 2 March 1916, be automatically deemed to have enlisted.

In May 1916 the Act was extended to married men. In Craske's second attestation for army service, on 26 May 1916 when he was aged 34 years and 10 months, he was rated C3 and so exempt from active service. The C3 designation meant he was "only suitable for sedentary work" but was fit to serve in home garrisons.

In 1917 Laura tore muscles in her side and the doctor said she must give up the work in the smoke house. That same week, Craske went into the army, spending six months in the training corps. For some of the time he was at Pulham Market and other times at Dereham, working on his physical fitness, digging trenches or on route marches. Some local people appealed against Craske's exemption and he was called up.

He was mobilised from the Britannia Barracks, Norwich, to Croydon, to the Bedfordshire Regiment Transport, his number 39126. On 7 April 1917, Laura received a telegram to say Craske had influenza and had collapsed while training. He was in the Davidson Road War Hospital in Croydon (which was in a requisitioned school). Three days later she received another telegram saying that an American doctor at the Royal Herbert Hospital, Woolwich, had diagnosed an abscess on the brain and said that Craske would be permanently prone to attacks of nervous collapse. Laura and his mother went to Croydon and arrived at midnight. Craske had been transferred to the Brook Hospital. In all he went to seven hospitals. He was diagnosed as an imbecile, unfit due to "mental stupor (Perm.)" and in August was sent to the Norfolk County Asylum at Thorpe outside Norwich. Laura visited him three times a week until he came home. Craske was discharged from the army on 28 October 1918.

== Invalid life ==
On 31 October 1918, Craske was discharged into Laura's care and she brought him home. He slipped in and out of "a stuporous state", which could last up to three years, although he could manage to eat and drink. He came under the care of Dr Victor John Duigan who suggested that the sea air might cure him. They locked up the house and went to Grimsby to stay with his brothers, Edward and Robert, who took him out fishing. One day he seemed to ‘wake up’ and asked ‘Why am I here? This is not our home’. He and Laura immediately returned to Dereham. Needing to make a living Laura prayed for guidance and decided to look for a shop.

In April 1919 Craske found that 15 Norwich Street was empty and he was able to rent it. Laura and her sister cleaned the shop and prepared it for business. She opened the fish shop on the Friday week before Easter. The local people supported them and they never wanted for rent. The shop was open from 8am to 8.30pm for six days a week.

Craske’s father suddenly died in the spring of 1920 (19 April) and John Craske relapsed through shock. Duigan suggested to Craske that he should try painting. By August Craske was ill in “mind and body”. Following Duigan's recommendation for 'sea air', they went to Blakeney to stay for three weeks in a cottage called ‘The Pightle’ which the family rented for them. The cottage was not suitable, it had windows below street level, but it had been booked for six months by her brother-in-law so she had to pay £1 a week. They returned to Dereham in 1921 to find their rented house in Norwich Road was not available and the shop had been sold as the owner had died. A smaller shop at 21 Norwich Street had been bought by the family but there was no room for them as Robert and his wife Carrie were living in the rooms above the shop. Craske took that to heart.

In 1923 Laura bought an unfurnished cottage in Wiveton for £100 down, with £70 she borrowed from Robert. She undertook to pay back £5 a week. She sent home for some furniture and was surprised when all her belongings were sent. Craske’s mother stayed with them for the first three months they were there and the brothers visited at weekends. During the time at Wiveton they bought a ship’s boat and Craske cut the sails, Laura made them on her sewing machine. They used to go out on the ebb and come back by the flow and Craske steadily improved in health although he still used a wheelchair.

Laura would take him for long walks four miles in each direction along the coastal path. Craske began to make and sell model boats and began to be able to walk a little. Some Americans staying at Sheringham bought two model boats.

== Art career ==
Early in 1926 Laura and Craske returned to Dereham to a house at the top of Norwich Road near Laura’s brother. Laura sold the cottage at Wiveton for its purchase price and paid Robert back his loan. When Craske was well, he helped at the shop. During the summer whilst painting the firm’s van, Craske suffered sunstroke. Duigan advised another spell by the sea and they took a cottage in Hemsby. Craske continued to make model boats and took up painting. He painted a boat on the lid of a bait box and another on a bread board. He always painted seascapes and boats and used any flat surface – plywood from tea chests, box lids, and door panels. He moved around the front room of his cottage painting on every surface and used whitewash, house paint or any paint he could find.

In 1927 Valentine Ackland was staying with her parents in Winterton and heard from an aunt about an invalid fisherman who made model boats. She set off to find him and visited their home where she saw the paintings on doors and every available surface. She admired a picture of the fishing boat The James Edward and wanted to buy it. As neither Craske nor Laura would name a price she offered them 30 shillings, which they accepted.

=== Painting with wool ===
Craske and Laura moved back to Dereham in 1928 and bought the house in Norwich Road which they previously rented. By now Craske had been diagnosed as being diabetic and was too ill to help with the move or to decorate the neglected house. While Laura redecorated the house they stayed with Laura’s mother at 14 Norwich Street. One evening Craske was so restless that Laura suggested they could make a picture from wools. The only calico they could find was a piece that Laura’s mother had bought for Christmas pudding cloths. Once Craske had been shown needlework he began to ‘paint with wool’; in December 1928 his first work was a ‘mantle border’. He had started embroidery because he could stitch while lying down. He used deck chair frames as stretchers for the cloth and old gramophone needles to secure the cloth.

His brothers Edward and William helped him with creative projects such as a concrete fish pond in the shape of a whale in the back garden of 42 Norwich Road, which Craske decorated with shells, and a wood carving of a shark under the front window. If he was not bed-ridden Craske would always be found out in his garden.

His health went into another decline and during long periods of illness he worked in his primitive form of wool embroidery and depicted the scenes of the seafaring life he had known. He worked his embroideries in any materials he could find including wool and string.

=== Recognition by American collectors ===
Meanwhile, Valentine Ackland showed The James Edward painting at the Warren Gallery in Maddox St, London in 1929. It was seen by Dorothy Warren who gave Valentine Ackland a blank cheque to obtain Craske paintings for her gallery. She tracked down the Craskes to Dereham and bought several of his paintings and some early embroidery. These were exhibited at the Warren Gallery in 1930. Reviews in The Times and Daily Mail were favourable, "the ship pictures by Mr John Craske are definitely – if crudely – works of art," said The Times, while the Mail declared: "the work, though childishly naive, has extraordinary charm and decorative effectiveness".

In 1931 Ackland took a new friend, novelist Sylvia Townsend Warner, to meet Craske and she bought several paintings. A second exhibition in 1933 at the Warren gallery brought in more revenue for them.

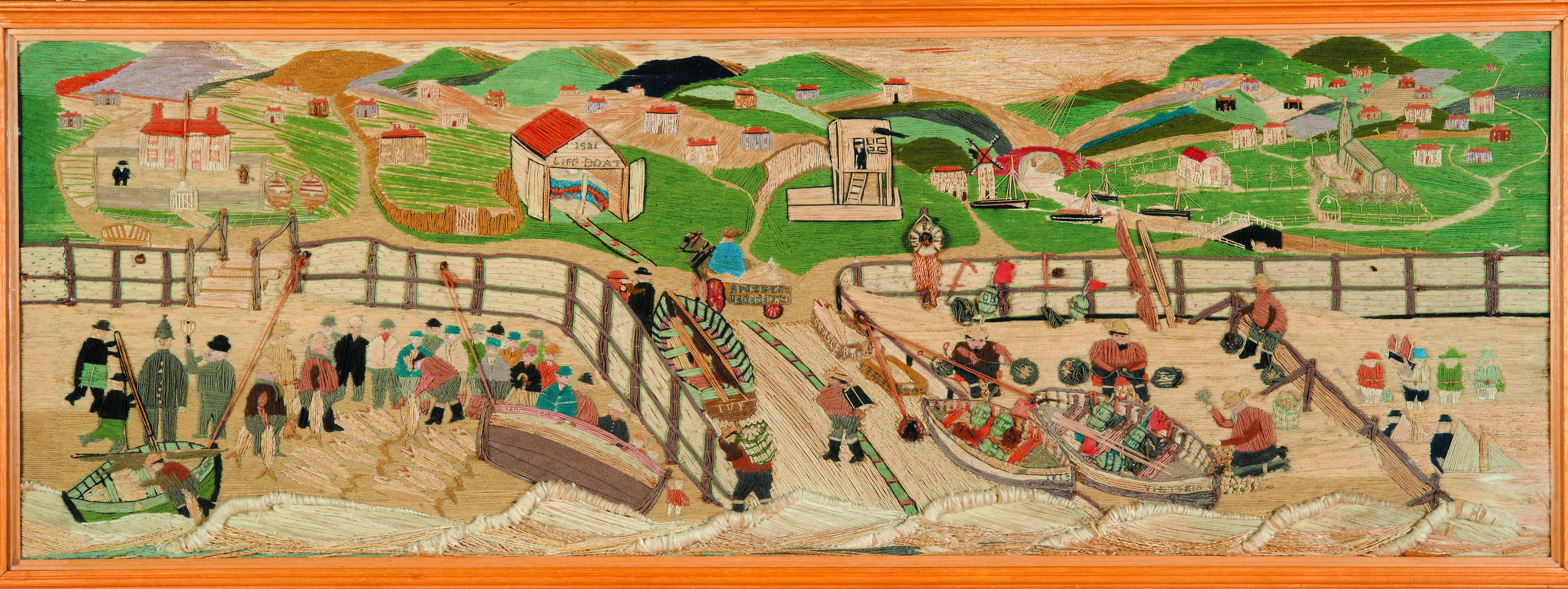
Beach Scene: the original embroidery by John Craske can be seen at the Red House, Aldeburgh.

By now Craske was concentrating on his embroideries and made the 14 feet (4.3 m) Panorama of the Norfolk Coast (now exhibited at Glandford Shell Museum). Another, Beach Scene, was later acquired by Peter Pears (now held at the Red House at Aldeburgh).

Another Ackland friend, American Elizabeth Wade White, had contacts with several American galleries and exhibitions, so a considerable number of pictures were shipped to America. In 1941 Craske's work was featured in an exhibition at Ala Story's American British Art Center in New York.

In 1942 Craske was working on a canvas which was 132 inches (3.4 m) long and 22 inches (0.56 m) wide with 800 soldiers in boats and on the beaches depicting the Evacuation of Dunkirk. Craske had listened on the wireless to accounts of the small boats who sailed to rescue soldiers from the French coast in the historic World War II evacuation. This embroidery is now held by the Norfolk Museums Service.

In 1943 Craske was taken into hospital taking his canvas with him and continued working on Dunkirk right up to his death. A small area is unfinished. He died on 26 August 1943, and was buried in the cemetery on Cemetery Road in Dereham. Laura died in 1957 at 42 Norwich Road, and was buried next to her husband in Dereham cemetery, where the grave can still be seen.

== Legacy ==
After his death, Craske's work as an artist was recognised for its details of a bygone way of life, and his work was exhibited in the Glandford Shell Museum, Strangers' Hall Norwich and at Snape Maltings. His art also featured in the American British Art Center in New York, and in 1950 was exhibited at the Margaret Brown Gallery, Boston and the Mattatuck Museum, Waterbury, Connecticut.

Meanwhile, Warner had struck up a friendship with the British tenor, Sir Peter Pears and loaned several of her Craske works for an exhibition at the Aldeburgh Festival which had been started by Pears together with his musical associate, the composer Benjamin Britten. They both started to collect works by Craske. In 1970 Warner donated many of her Craske works to the Aldeburgh Festival. She felt that she had discovered Craske and wanted to protect his legacy and she wanted the body of work to be kept in East Anglia where she felt it belonged and so she gave most of what she owned to Peter Pears because she felt he understood her and her love of Craske.

A biography of Craske records:

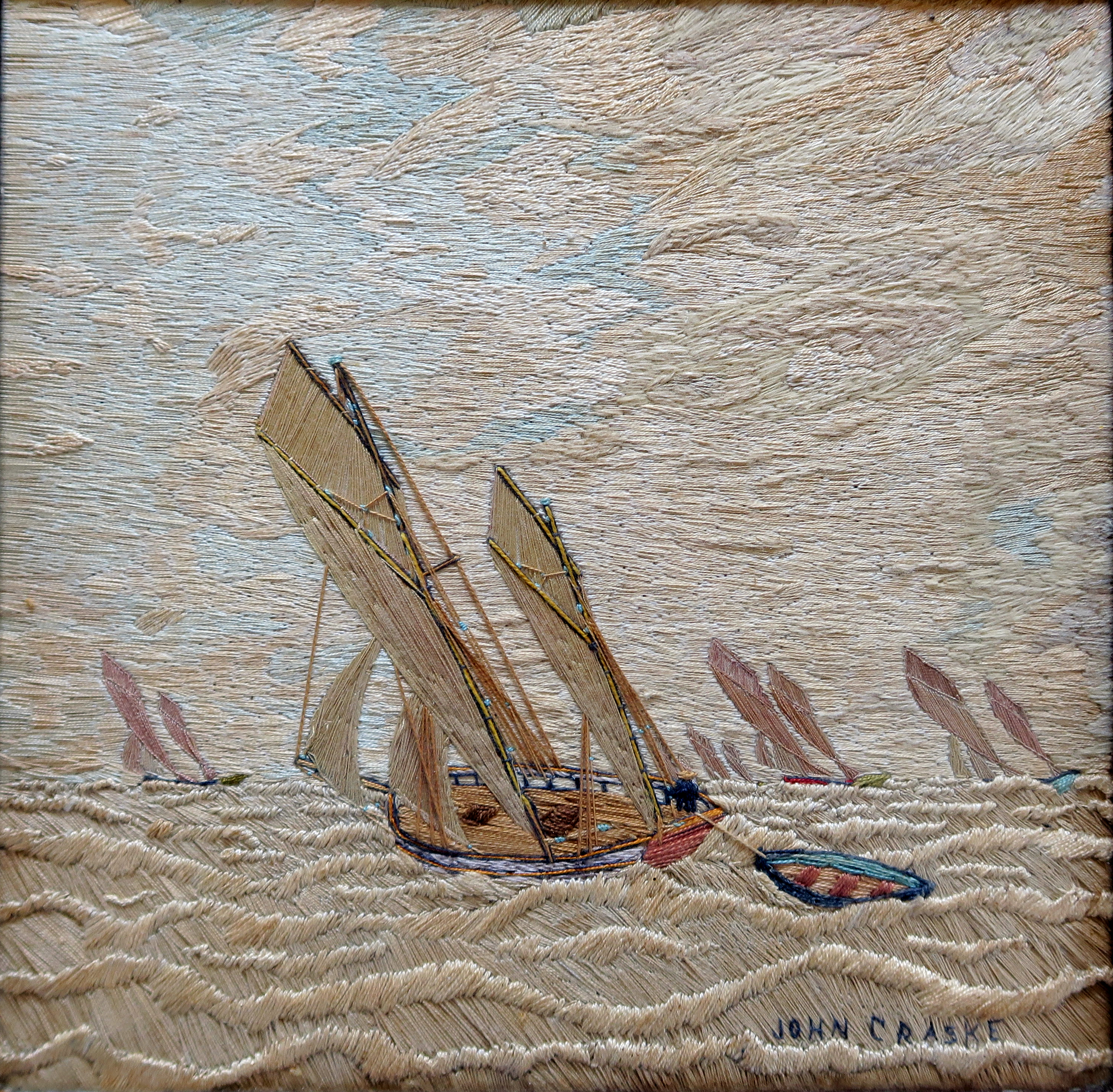
Embroidery 'Lowestoft Fleet' part of the Duigan family collection

"The display of forty-seven pictures at the twenty-fourth Aldeburgh Festival, in 1971, was the first major Craske retrospective, the nucleus formed by the Sylvia Townsend Warner and Valentine Ackland bequest and individual works lent by friends - Bea Howe, Gerald Finzi's wife, Janet Machen, Elizabeth Wade White and Valentine's solicitor Peg Manisty. A further group of six works came from John Duigan, son of Craske's doctor in Dereham who had originally accepted them in settlement of outstanding medical bills. The exhibition with a catalogue essay by Warner and an enthusiastic article by Bea Howe in Country Life, was such a success that other, more modest exhibitions were held at the festival in 1973, 1977 and 1980."

Works owned by Peter Pears are on display at the Red House, Aldeburgh. There is also a considerable archive including photographs and correspondence between Craske and Laura and their American benefactors. The archive contains a typescript of John's own hand-written account of his life, entitled 'My Life and The Sea'.

In 1993, 50 years after Craske's death, the Chairman of the Dereham Antiquarian Society (now Dereham Heritage Trust), Terry Davy, organised an exhibition of more than 50 of Craske's paintings and embroideries and he also wrote and published a pamphlet with first hand accounts of Craske's life.

A second exhibition was held in Dereham in 2004. In 2005, Craske's nephew, William Frederick Edward Craske (Bill) gave Craske's portrait, a painting and an embroidery to Sheringham Museum.

Many newspaper, magazine and scholarly articles have been written about Craske, his life with Laura and the works of art he created. A 2015 book Threads: The Delicate Life of John Craske by Julia Blackburn was launched with an exhibition of his work at Norwich University of the Arts gallery, curated by Blackburn and Professor Neil Powell, and was favourably reviewed.
