= Gerasim Lebedev =

Russian musician and linguist (1749-1817)

Gerasim Stepanovich Lebedev (Russian: Гера́сим Степа́нович Ле́бедев; 1749 – July 27, 1817), also spelled Herasim Steppanovich Lebedeff (Bengali: হেরাসিম স্তেপানোভিচ লেবেদেফ), was a Russian adventurer, linguist, pioneer of Bengali theatre (founded European-style proscenium drama theatre in India in 1795), translator, musician and writer. He was a pioneer of Indology.

== Early life ==
Lebedev was born in Yaroslavl, Russia, to a family of a church choirmaster. Gerasim was the oldest son in the family. He had two brothers: Afanasy and Trefil and sister Antonida. The family later moved to Saint Petersburg where Lebedev's father worked in a church. Lebedev learned English, French and German by his own effort. In Saint Petersburg Lebedev became acquainted with Fyodor Volkov, the founder of the first permanent Russian theater. Lebedev was a singer in the court choir and participated in the performances of Volkov's theater as well.

He was a self-taught violinist and accompanied Andreas Razumovsky, the ambassador designate from Russia to Vienna, as a member of a musical group. He fled the entourage and travelled across Europe, earning his livelihood as a violinist. He soon joined an English military band that was being sent to India. Lebedev arrived at Madras (now Chennai), a port in southern India in August 1785. He was felicitated by the mayor of Madras and earned some money from musical programmes. However, the conservative society stifled him and so after living in Madras for a couple of years he left for Bengal.

== In Calcutta ==
The Young Bengal generation would act Shakespeare at David Hare Academy and the Oriental Seminary. Inevitably, the New Bengalis came to conceive the idea of a new Bengali theatre.

Interestingly though, the first Bengali plays had been staged well before this, not by a Bengali but by a remarkable Russian scholar-adventurer, Gerasim Lebedeff (1749-1818). With the help of his Bengali tutor Goloknath Das, he made free adaptations of The Disguise by an ‘M. Jodrelle’ and Molière’s L’Amour Médecin. This double bill was presented on 27 November 1795 and 21 March 1796 at a ‘New Theatre in the Domtulla (now Ezra Street) Decorated in the Bengallee style.’ The 200-seat house was ‘overfull’ on both nights; but Lebedeff left India soon after, and his pioneer efforts bore no fruit.

— Raha, Kironmoy

Lebedev lived in Calcutta (now Kolkata), then the capital of British India, for about ten years. During his stay, he started to learn Hindi, Sanskrit and Bengali from a local schoolteacher named Golokhnath Das. In exchange, Lebedev had to teach Das violin and European music. With the support of a Russian doctor, then practicing in Calcutta, he was soon established as a musician. Tickets for his musical programmes were priced at Rs. 12. Lebedev was the first person to use Indian tunes on Western musical instruments.

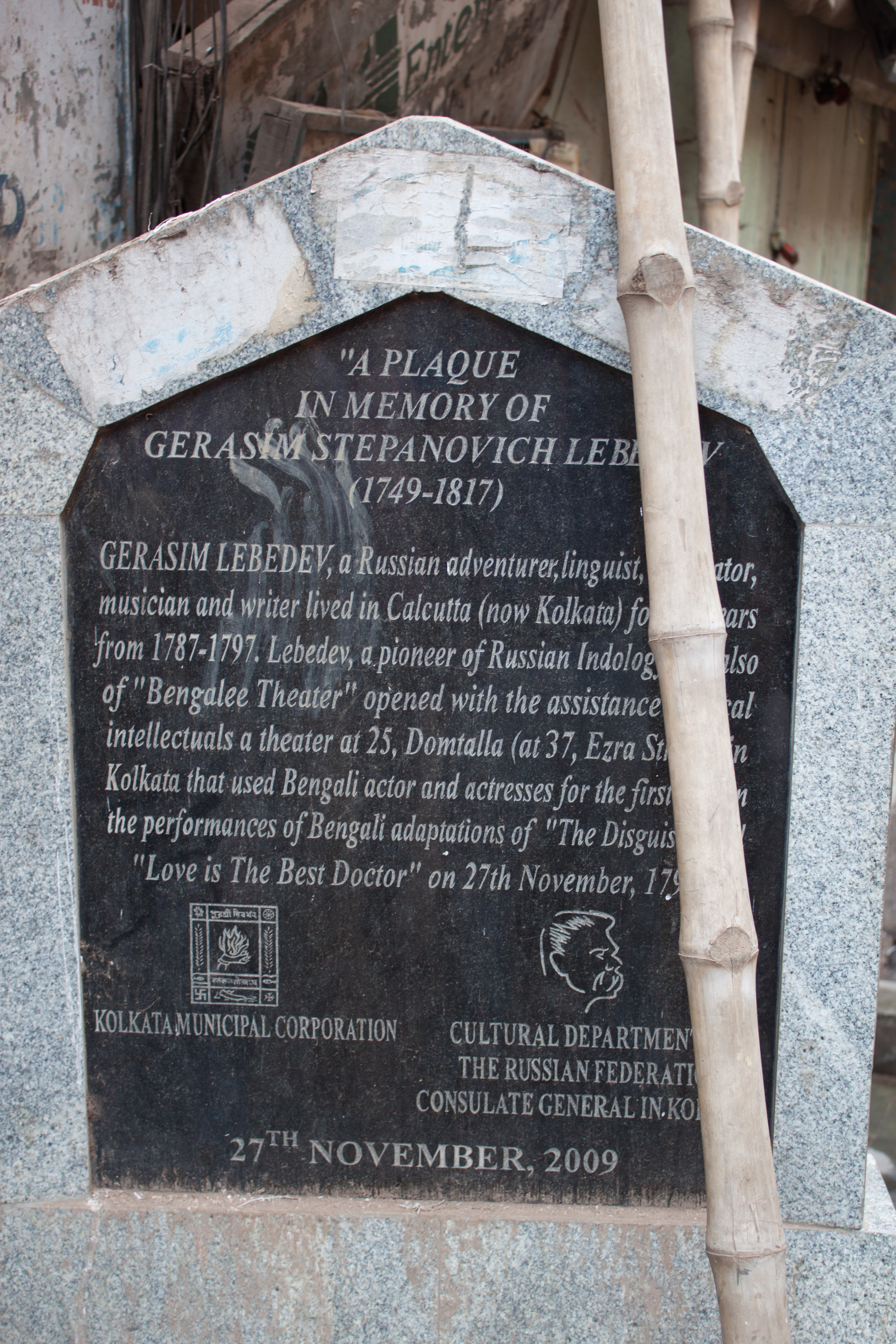
Plaque in memory of Gerasim Stepanovich Lebedev in Kolkata

With assistance from local intellectuals, Lebedev founded the first European-style proscenium drama theatre in India. This theatre opened in Calcutta in 1795. Lebedev translated two plays into Bengali; they were Love is the Best Doctor and The Disguise. These two were the first performances in the theatre, with music composed by Lebedev himself and lyrics borrowed from the Bengali poet Bharatchandra Ray.

The theatre Lebedev established at Domtala (Ezra Street) used for the first time Bengali actors and actresses. The show held on 27 November 1795 is considered the first performance of the modern Indian theatre. At that time there were two theatre halls for the English in Calcutta. Lebedev was so successful that it aroused envy in Englishmen and two of them burnt down his theatre. Lebedev's attempt was somewhat premature, but it proved that a nucleus of clients ready to pay for public performances had already been formed in the city.

He compiled a small Bengali dictionary, wrote a book on arithmetic in Bengali and translated part of Annadamangal into Russian. His dictionary was published in 1801. He wrote to the Russian ambassador in London about publishing Bharatchandra Ray's works in Russia.

However, the British administration was not supportive of Lebedev's activities and was annoyed by his sympathetic stance towards the Indians. He also lost a court case against an employee, theatre decorator Joseph Batsh and was broken financially. Finally, the British authorities expelled him from India in 1797. He was virtually bankrupt, possessing only a small bag of belongings valued at Rs. 295. He was forced to stay a few months in Cape Town to earn money for the ticket to Europe.

== Return to Russia ==
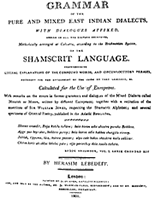
Cover of the grammar of Indian dialects by Lebedev

Lebedev stopped in London on his way back to Russia. In London he published Grammar of the Pure and Mixed East Indian Languages which was based on his studies of the character of some of the Indian languages, their sources of origin and affinity with Asian and European languages.

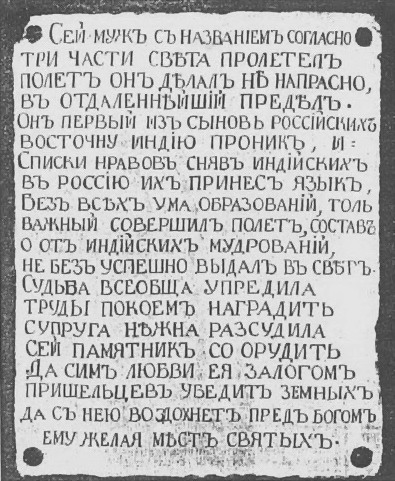
Tablet on Gerasimov's grave

On his return to Russia, he was employed by the Foreign Ministry. He established in St. Petersburg a printing house equipped with Devanāgarī and Bengali scripts, the first of its kind in Europe. He published his second book Unbiased observations on Brahmin customs (“Беспристрастное созерцание брагменских обычаев...”), and prepared two other books but could not finish those due to illness. Lebedev died in his printing house on 15 July (O.S.; 27 July [N.S.]) 1817 and was interred in the Gergiev Cemetery of Bolshaya Okhta in Saint Petersburg.

== Works ==
- A Grammar of the Pure and Mixed East Indian Dialects (London, 1801), or, A grammar of the pure and mixed East Indian dialects,: With dialogues affixed ... arranged ... according to the Brahmenian system, of the Shamscrit language ... Jones, respecting the Shamscrit alphabet
- An Impartial Contemplation of the East Indian Systems of Brahmins (St Petersburg, 1805) or An Impartial Review of the East Indian Brahminical System of Sacred Rites and Customs
- A Collection of Hindustani and Bengali Arias

== See also ==
- Hindu Theatre
