= Jodrell baronets =

Escutcheon of the Jodrell baronets of Salle Park

The Lombe, later Jodrell baronetcy, of Salle Park in the County of Norfolk, was a title in the Baronetage of Great Britain. It was created on 22 January 1784 for John Lombe, High Sheriff of Norfolk in 1772. There was a special remainder in default of male issue of his own to his brother Edward Hase and the heirs male of his body and in default thereof to the male issue of Edward Hase's daughter, Vertue, wife of the classical scholar and playwright Richard Paul Jodrell. Born John Hase, he had assumed the surname of Lombe in lieu of his patronymic by Act of Parliament, which was that of his maternal grandfather, Edward Lombe.

The 2nd Baronet, under the special remainder, was his great-nephew Richard Paul Jodrell, the son of Vertue and Richard Paul Jodrell.

The title became extinct on the death of the 4th Baronet in 1929.

== Lombe, later Jodrell baronets, of Salle Park (1784) ==
- Sir John Lombe, 1st Baronet (c. 1731–1817)
- Sir Richard Paul Jodrell, 2nd Baronet (1781–1861)
- Sir Edward Repps Jodrell, 3rd Baronet (1825–1882)
- Sir Alfred Jodrell, 4th Baronet (1847–1929), left no heir.

Baronetage of Great Britain
Preceded by Smith baronets	Lombe baronets of Salle Park; 22 January 1784	Succeeded by Durrant baronets
