= Bayfield Hall =

Historic building in Norfolk, England

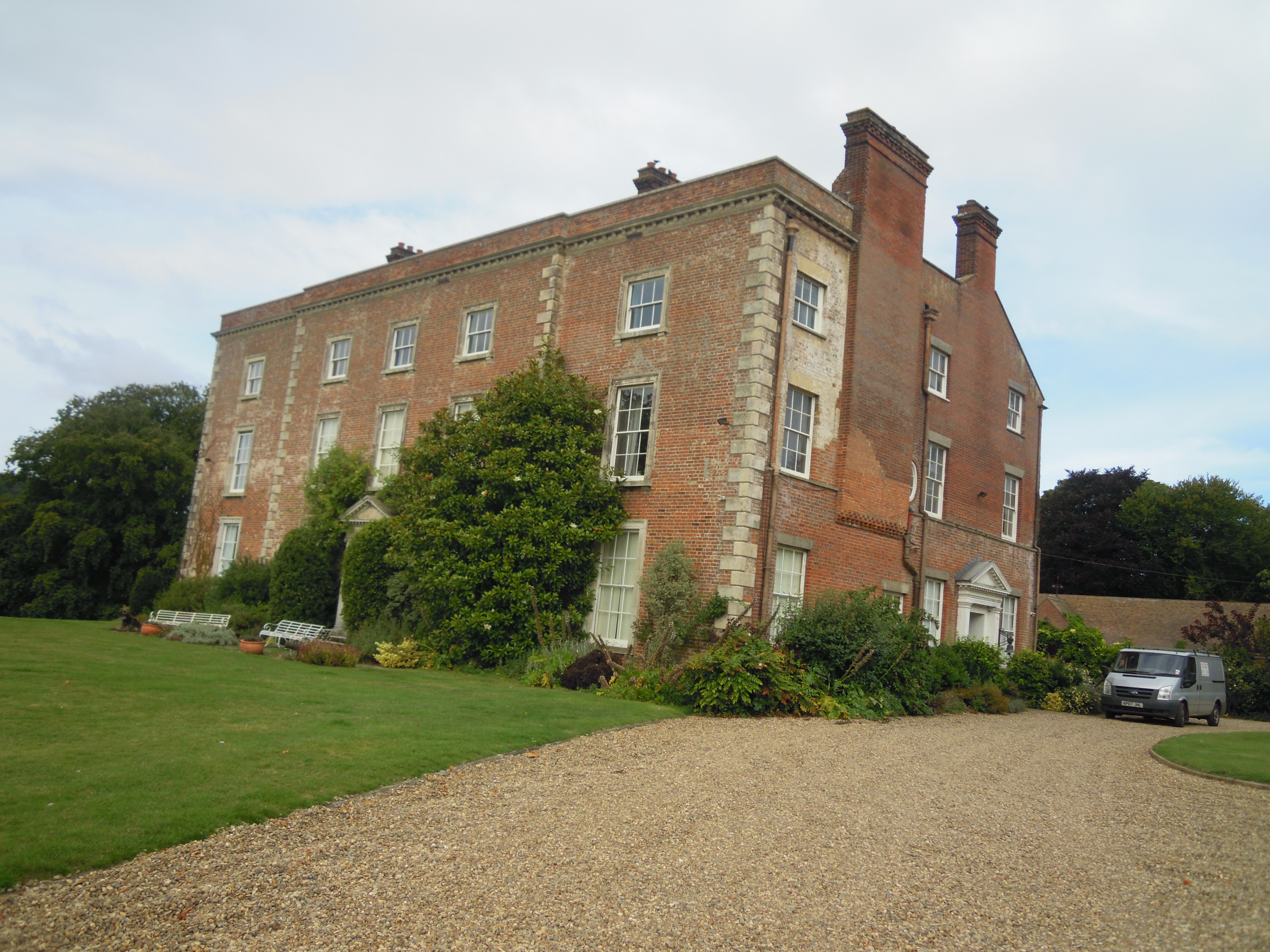
- The south façade

- Location within Norfolk

General information
- Type: Historic house
- Location: Glandford, Letheringsett, Norfolk NR25 7JN, Holt, England
- Coordinates: 52.922716°N 1.046514°E
- Completed: Late 18 century

Website

Listed Building – Grade II
- Designated: 30 September 1987
- Reference no.: 1152147

Bayfield Hall is a Grade II* listed building which stands in a small estate close to the village of Letheringsett and the hamlet of Glandford in the English county of Norfolk within the United Kingdom. The house that stands today was built in the last part of the 18 century replacing an earlier manor house thought to have been built in the 16 century. That house had been constructed of an early medieval manor house.

== Architecture ==
The house seen today is a late 18th century Georgian style construction built on a rectangular plan with a service wing running off to the rear facing east, forming a right angle to the body of the house. The main body of the house is built over three storeys with the front facade facing to the south. The south elevation has five bays with the centre three bays forward of the building line with stone quoins which match the same featured at the corners of the building. This facade is topped with a brick parapet set above a stone cornice with corbel or Modillion underneath supporting the cornice. The parapet is topped with stone copings. The main body of the building is built in a red-brown brick

== History ==
=== Etymology ===
The name Bayfield devolved from the Anglo-Saxon language and has the meaning of the Open Field owned by the Bæga's.

=== The deserted village ===
The hall stands next to the ruins of the medieval church of Saint Margaret which was the parish church for the lost settlement of the village of Bayfield which once stood around the ruined church.

=== Domesday Book ===
The village is listed in the Domesday Book, where it is under the name "Baiafelda". In the survey the manor is said to be land owned by the King. The main tenant in chief was Walter Giffard, and on the land there was a 1 1/4 mill. In the Domesday survey, fractions were used to indicate that the entry, in this case a mill, was on an estate that lay within more than one parish. Before the Norman Conquest of 1066, the manor of Bayfield had been owned by a freeman called Godric, but after 1066 he was ejected from the land.

During the reign of Edward I, the manor of Bayfield was owned by Sir John de Vaux, along with Holt and Cley next the Sea. The land and manor then changed ownership many times until in 1661, when the Yelvertons sold the manor to Colonel Robert Jermy. By this time there were just a few houses in the village, with the medieval house and Saint Margaret's church.

=== Colonel Robert Jermy ===
Robert Jermy was a lawyer in the reign of Charles I. He was educated at Christ's College, Cambridge followed by the Middle Temple, one of the four Inns of Court. In 1629 he was called to the Bar. To continue his affluent and privilege status he took the side of the Parliamentarians during the English Civil War. He became a Colonel in Cromwell's New Model Army. He also became a Member of Parliament and a commissioner. Following the crushing of Royalist up-rising in Norfolk in December 1650, Jermy was given a position on the special court set up on 20 December to deal with the rebels. Within a short period of time, Jermy and his fellow commissioners had sentenced twenty Royalists to death. This made Jermy unpopular within the Holt area as he was instrumental in the execution of a local man by the name of Thomas Cooper. Cooper was a one time usher of Gresham's School. He was hanged on Christmas Day in front of the school and then his body was left on display outside the school. In 1659 Robert Jermy involved himself in a scheme to rig the parliamentary election in Castle Rising. The unpopular Jermy decided it would be wise to remove himself from the limelight. He was granted permission to leave the country and fled to New England, although he was still a Member of Parliament.

So unpopular was Jermy that a song was written that told the story of his misdeeds, calling him "the Baby of Mars", "a Journeyman soldier", "a pitiful soldier", "a cruel man", "a rascal" and "a coward" and criticised him for fleeing to New England. Following the restoration of the crown Jermy returned to the manor of Bayfield from America. He hoped to live quietly for the rest of his days as Lord of Bayfield. In 1663 he asked one of his friends who was close to the crown to recommend him for a baronetcy. Unfortunately this was not forthcoming. It seems people in power had longer memories of his questionable deeds, and his every move to achieve honours was blocked. William Jermy lived to a good age and he died in 1677.

The land, house and manor of Bayfield remained within the Jermy family until the death of William Jermy on 21 January 1752. He died without issue. Following a court battle over William's will and dubious financial deals between William's wife and his brother in law, Bayfield Hall, and 700 acres (280 ha) were sold to a Mr Buxton for the sum of £7,600 in 1766.

=== Jodrell residency ===
Francis Buxton had purchased Bayfield Hall in trust for Elizabeth Jodrell, the wife of Paul Jodrell. The estate eventually fell into the possession of Henry Jodrell who was Paul and Elizabeth Jodrell's third and youngest son.

Henry Jodrell was a barrister and he became the member of parliament for Great Yarmouth in 1796, a position he held until 1802. He then became the member for Bramber, Sussex from 1802 to 1812. In the parliamentary vote of 1807 to abolish slavery Jodrell voted against the act.

Following the death of Henry in 1814, an attempt was made through the courts by Jonathan Jermy, a weaver from Norwich, to claim the Bayfield estate stating that he was entitled due to being the great-great-grandson of William Jermy. The claim was rejected by the courts under the statute of Limitations in 1819. The estate at this time was owned by another Edward Jodrell (b. 1785 d. 1852) who was Henry's nephew.

Edward Jodrell in turn passed the estate on to his son who was also Edward Jodrell who was a captain in the 16th Regiment of Foot in 1843. Edward's military career included being placed on garrison duties in Ireland in 1843, remaining there until 1846 when he then moved to Gibraltar. In the following year he was posted to Corfu, forming part of the garrison of the United States of the Ionian Islands, a British protectorate.

==== Sir Alfred Jodrell ====
In 1882 the Hall and its estate was inherited by Sir Alfred Jodrell. Alfred was the youngest son of Captain Edward Jodrell. He gained the title of 4th Baronet Jodrell. He was married to Lady Jane Grimston, daughter of James Walter Grimston, 2nd Earl of Verulam. Alfred Jodrell is best remembered for his desire to benefit the local community after his good fortune in his inheritance of Bayfield Hall. He is quoted as saying I intend to leave the estate in better condition than when I inherited it. This philosophy he fulfilled in his tenure of the estate. The nearby hamlet of Glanford village with its decaying cottages, he completely rebuilt, giving his estate workers a very comfortable and healthier living standard. He spent a great deal of money on the village, especially on his project to rebuild the decrepit Saint Martin's church which he began in 1899. The church stands on the crest of a knoll within the village and he dedicated the renovations to his mother Adel Monckton Jodrell. The church took seven years to complete employing a team of workers headed by two wood carvers from Great Yarmouth. He had new stained glass windows installed by Kempe and Bryans the renowned glass makers. Other work on the church included a new hammer-beam roof with carved ends displaying shields, rood screen, choir stalls and marble floors with the stone imported from Italy. The greater community also benefited from Jodrell's philanthropy. He carried out restoration work on the parish churches of Salle, Letheringsett, Blakeney and Wiveton.

Jodrell was also noted for his generosity. He would send basket of fresh fruit and vegetables every week to the Norfolk and Norwich Hospital in Norwich. At Christmas he sent the hospital 40 chickens and 40 turkeys plucked and oven ready. He gave generously to many charities and good causes especially to his locality. His generosity extended to his friends as well. He was known for his hosted dinners where he served the finest food and wine to his guest, although he himself abstained from alcohol. He once hosted King George V who visited from his Norfolk home at Sandringham to attend a pheasant shoot on the estate organised by Jodrell. Jodrell was also a keen collector and had collections of teapots and ceramic birds although he is best known for his collection of seashells. He had a museum built next to St Martine's church to house the collection. The museum can still be visited.
