= The Shell Museum =

Shell museum in Glandford, England

Coordinates: 52°55′53.6″N 01°02′23.2″E

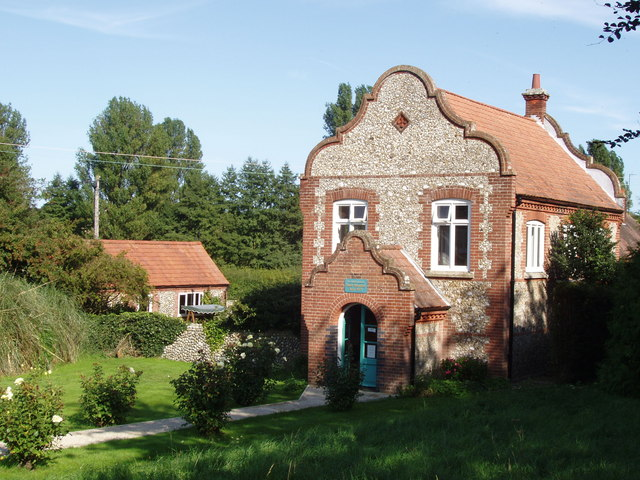
The Glandford Shell Museum

The Shell Museum in Glandford, Norfolk is the oldest museum in the county and holds one of the country's largest collections of sea shells. It was founded by Alfred Jodrell. As well as sea shells it contains articles made out of shells, fossils, bird eggs and local archaeological finds. It also has a collection of work by John Craske.

Prior to the construction of the museum the collection was housed in boxes in the founder's house.
