= John Tarleton (MP) =

English ship-owner, slave-trader & politician (1755-1841)

John Tarleton (26 October 1755 – 19 September 1841) was an English ship-owner, slave-trader and politician.

He was a son of John Tarleton, a West Indies merchant and slave trader, from Aigburth near Liverpool, and brother of Banastre Tarleton.

The younger John also became a West India merchant, in partnership with his brothers Thomas and Clayton, and Daniel Backhouse. Between 1786 and 1804 he invested in 39 Liverpool-registered ships.

At the 1790 general election he unsuccessfully contested the borough of Seaford, but an election petition resulted in him being awarded the seat in 1792. In Parliament, he opposed measures to abolish or regulate the slave trade.

At the 1796 general election, he did not contest Seaford but stood against his brother Banastre in Liverpool, but failed to win a seat.

Tarleton married Isabella Collingwood (c.1770–c.1850), who was heir of Alexander Collingwood of Unthank and Little Ryle, near Alnham. Their four children were all born between 1792 and 1806 in Liverpool. Tarleton went on to inherit the Collingwood estates in Northumberland, and also owned property in Gloucester Place, London.

John Tarleton died on 20 September 1841 at 14 Grove Terrace, London, and was buried at St Pancras.

Parliament of the United Kingdom
Preceded by Richard Paul Jodrell; John Sargent	Member of Parliament for Seaford; 1792 – 1796; With: John Sargent; Richard Paul Jodrell	Succeeded by Charles Rose Ellis; George Ellis
