= John Tarleton (slave trader) =

English ship-owner (1718–1773)

John Tarleton (1718–1773) was an English ship-owner and slave-trader, and Mayor of Liverpool in 1764.

Tarleton was born in 1718 to Thomas Tarleton of Bolesworth Castle a slave trader and owner in Grenada, who with his brother John had been involved with trading in West Indies and Africa.

Tarleton was the part-owner and manager of several ships engaged in the slave trade, the Tarleton and the Swan in the 1750s, and the John in the 1760s, mainly delivering slaves to Jamaica. At his death in 1773, Tarleton also owned slaves at the Belfield Estate in Dominica. Tarleton rose to become a prominent Liverpool merchant, and after becoming Mayor in 1764, was encouraged to stand for Parliament, but declined. Tarleton made significant investment in real estate in his last decade. He owned estates in Carriacou and Dominica as well as stores and houses at Grenada and Grand Ance, Carriacou. He also had several houses in Liverpool, Fairfield Estate near Buxton and tenements at Aigburth near Liverpool, and finally secured part of Aigburth Hall Estate – the old family house – about 1770. Aigburth Hall, located on Aigburth Hall Avenue, was demolished around 1840.

Tarleton married Jane Parker (1726–1797), daughter and coheir of Banastre Parker of Cuerden, Lancashire. Tarleton died in 1773, and was survived by five sons, three of whom continued in the family business. Son John Tarleton was an MP and slave trader, Banastre Tarleton was a soldier and MP, Clayton and Thomas were slave traders.
