= George Heard Hamilton =

American art historian

- Photograph of Hamilton.
- Born: 1910; Pittsburgh, Pennsylvania, U.S.
- Died: March 29, 2004 (aged 93–94); Williamstown, Massachusetts, U.S.
- Occupations: Art historian Educator; Curator
- Spouse: Polly Wiggin (m. 1946)
- Children: 2 (Richard and Jennet)

Academic background
- Education: Yale University
- Thesis: Delacroix and the Orient: Studies in the Iconography of the Romantic Experience (1942)

Academic work
- Discipline: Art history
- Sub-discipline: Modern and Russian art
- Institutions: Yale University; Williams College

George Heard Hamilton (1910 – March 29, 2004) was an American art historian, educator, and curator. Hamilton taught art history at Yale University and Williams College, and was the acting director of the Yale University Art Gallery and the Clark Art Institute.

== Early life and education ==
Hamilton was born in Pittsburgh to Frank and Georgia Heard, and received three degrees from Yale University: a Bachelor of Arts in English in 1932, a Master of Arts in history in 1934, and a Doctor of Philosophy in art history in 1942. He wrote a doctoral dissertation on the artist Eugène Delacroix. In 1937, Hamilton attended the Coronation of George VI and Elizabeth with lifelong friend Elizabeth Wade White.

== Career ==
Hamilton began his curatorial career as a research assistant at the Walters Art Museum from 1934 to 1936. He then returned to Yale University, where he joined the art history faculty. In 1940, he was named Curator of Modern Art at the Yale University Art Gallery, and served as the gallery's associate director from 1946 to 1948.

In 1956, Hamilton was named a full professor at Yale University. From 1966 to 1975, Hamilton was a professor of art history at Williams College in Williamstown, Massachusetts and director of the Clark Art Institute at the college until 1977. He was a scholar of modern art and Russian art, focusing especially on artists Marcel Duchamp and Édouard Manet.

== Death ==
Hamilton died in Williamstown, Massachusetts on March 29, 2004. Papers from Hamilton's tenure at Yale University are held by the Yale University Library.

== Awards ==
- Guggenheim Fellowship (1958)
- Slade Professor of Fine Art, Cambridge University (1971)
- Wilbur Cross Medal (1976)

== See also ==
- List of people from Pittsburgh
- List of Williams College people
- List of Yale University people
