= Salle Park =

Country house in Norfolk, England

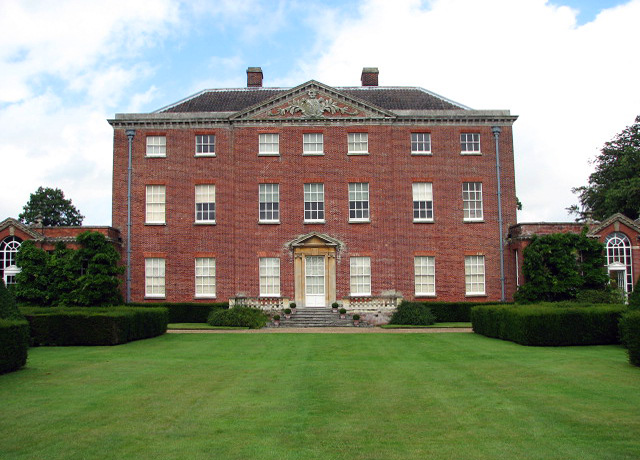
- Salle Hall viewed from the south

- Location within Norfolk

General information
- Status: Grade II* listed
- Architectural style: Palladian
- Location: Near Norwich, Norfolk grid reference TG 116 246, United Kingdom
- Coordinates: 52°46′38″N 1°8′10″E
- Completed: 1763

Website
- http://www.sallefarms.co.uk/

Salle Park is a country house in Norfolk, England, near the village of Salle and about 10 miles (16 km) north-west of Norwich. The house is a Grade II* listed building, and the park and garden are listed Grade II in Historic England's Register of Parks and Gardens.

It is the home of Sir John Woolmer White, 4th Baronet; the estate has been owned by the White family for over 100 years.

== Description ==
=== History ===
The current house, replacing an earlier house which stood near the northern boundary of the park, was built in 1763 for Edward Hase, by an unknown architect. It passed to the Jodrell family when his daughter Vertue married the dramatist Richard Paul Jodrell, her second cousin, in 1772. In 1890 Major Timothy White, ancestor of the present owner, acquired the estate.

=== House ===
The house is in Palladian style. The north side has a central stone portico. The south side, facing the garden, has a façade of 7 bays with a three-bay pediment; the central door has a stone pediment with ionic pilasters. Sir Woolmer White, 1st Baronet, added a west wing, and an east wing containing an orangery.

=== Gardens and estate ===
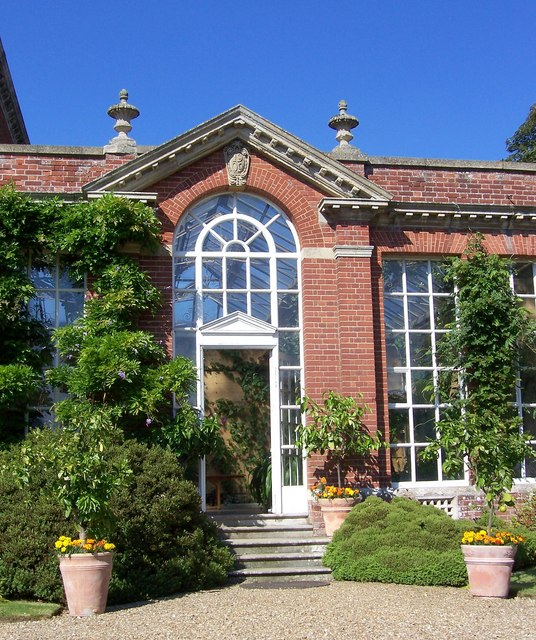
The orangery

Salle Park itself has an area of about 75 hectares (190 acres). There is a Georgian-style garden south of the house, with formal lawns and an avenue of clipped yews, extending to a curved ha-ha; beyond this the grounds are planted with trees and shrubs. The walled kitchen garden, built in the 1780s, is about 350 metres (1,150 ft) south-west of the house on the southern boundary of the park. As of 2020 it is possible to visit the gardens on a private guided tour.

Salle Park Estate owns a wider area of more than 1,681 hectares (4,150 acres), the land primarily devoted to arable farming. There are 150 hectares (370 acres) of woodland.

== See also ==
- Jodrell baronets
- White baronets
