= Elizabeth Wade White =

American writer and activist (1906–1994)

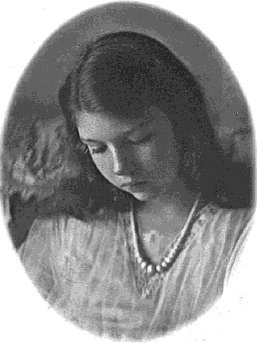
Elizabeth Wade White at age 18 in 1924 at Westover School

Elizabeth Wade White (June 8, 1906 – December 11, 1994) was an American writer, poet, and activist. She was a lover of Valentine Ackland and wrote The Life of Anne Bradstreet: The Tenth Muse, about the early American poet and first American writer to be published in the Thirteen Colonies.

== Early life ==
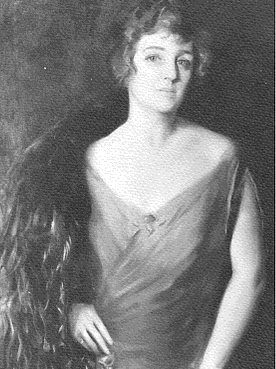
Elsie Rowland Chase (1863–1937). Mary Wade White in the 1920s

Elizabeth Wade White was born at 107 Prospect Street, Waterbury, Connecticut, the first child of William Henry White (1876–1952) and Mary Elizabeth Wade (1878–1949). She had one brother, Henry Wade White (1909–1995). Her paternal grandfather was George Luther White (1852–1914), one of the leading American paper box manufacturers and a stockholder of White & Wells and L.C. White Co. His estate amounted to half a million dollars which, at the time of his wife's death, Julia Phelps Haring (1852–1928), became $1.67 million ($31,312,500 in 2025 dollars). Her maternal grandfather was Henry Lawton Wade (1842–1912), a stockholder of the Waterbury Clock Company who left $1.75 million ($58,383,621 in 2025 dollars) to his two daughters, Lucy and Mary, Elizabeth's mother. The Wade and White families descended from the Puritans who migrated to New England in the 1630s.

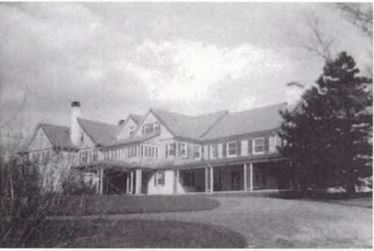
William Henry White (1876–1952)'s house, Breakneck Hill, Middlebury, Connecticut. The house was sold at Will White's death and razed down.

The Whites were well-off and in addition to the Prospect Street house they owned a country house at Breakneck Hill, Middlebury, Connecticut (overlooking Waterbury, only 6 miles from Prospect Street), and another house at Bass Rocks, Gloucester, Massachusetts. They also owned a house and shooting camp in Middleton, South Carolina, Strawberry Hill House, 30 miles north of Savannah, inherited by Henry Wade.

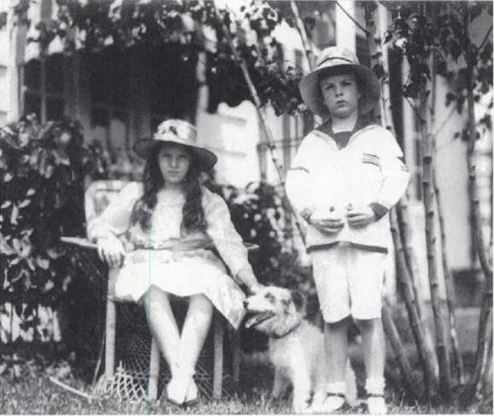
Betty and Wade White at Breakneck, 1915

White attended Westover School in Middlebury. White's closest female friend was Katherine Bullock (1908–1995), daughter of Calvin Bullock from Denver, who also attended Westover. They remained life-long friends and White was often a guest at the 18th-century Royalston, Massachusetts, houses Bullock's father bought and restored. Bullock married Henry P. Cole from Denver, and White was the godmother of their first child.

After graduation, White made her debut into society in December 1925 at a reception given at the Waterbury Club; her dress gown was in white chiffon over silver with white fur trimming. Early in 1927, White attended the Miss Risser's school in Rome together with her cousin, Helen "Henny" Chase Streeter, daughter of Edward Clark Streeter and Alice Chase, who later married John Bertram Whitelaw. After Rome, White attended school in New York City to study sculpture.

In 1937, White with her brother Henry and their friend, George Heard Hamilton, attended the Coronation of George VI and Elizabeth.

== Career ==
In the 1930s, White supported Franklin D. Roosevelt and his New Deal program. She conducted investigations in industrial and mining towns to understand labor conditions there. Her father did not approve of her support for Roosevelt.

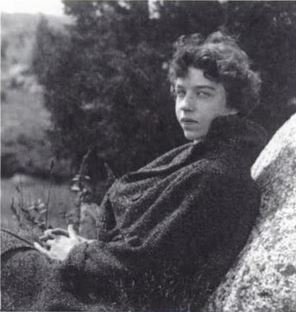
Elizabeth Wade White in 1935

In 1937, White moved to Dorset, England, ostensibly to conduct a research on Anne Bradstreet, an early American poet and the first American writer to be published in the Thirteen Colonies. This was actually an excuse used with her family; her real intent was to meet English novelist and poet, Sylvia Townsend Warner, and her partner Valentine Ackland, and to join the American Friends Service Committee, a group that was providing relief workers to Spain. Back in Connecticut, White had raised $1180 ($26,427 in 2025 dollars) for the Spanish Medical Aid Committee.

Between 1937 and 1938, White traveled many times to Spain, while her parents urged her to return to the United States. White rented a house in Dorset and continued to support Spain's cause, also hosting refugees.

At the beginning of World War II, White went back to the United States, living in New York City and volunteering for the American Red Cross as an ambulance driver. She also tried to raise awareness of the Russian War Relief effort. For her support of the Soviets, White was excluded from her mother's will: Mary left everything to her son, and White's brother Henry, with the agreement that Henry was to be the manager of her sister's part of inheritance. Henry did not share his mother's concerns, and as soon as possible, he passed the property of the "Patch", the house Mary had inherited from her own mother, and where White was living, to White, as well with her share of money.

At the end of the 1940s, White joined and became active in the Progressive Party. She was involved in the Communism movement, and was a supporter of the 1948 presidential campaign of Henry A. Wallace.

== Personal life ==
Late in 1938, White had a nervous breakdown and spent the Christmas season at Ackland and Warner's home in Dorset; she later started a relationship with Ackland. In For Sylvia: An Honest Account (1949), Ackland tries to explain her affair with White; the relationship was brief, and Ackland spent the rest of her life with Townsend Warner.

White was a supporter of John Craske, a painter friend of Ackland. For this reason she was in contact with Peter Pears, who was collecting Craske's works, and she donated her papers about the artists to the Aldeburgh Festival Archive (now part of the Britten-Pears Library).

In 1939 White met Evelyn Virginia Holahan (August 28, 1905 – May 27, 1985) and they later shared an apartment in Greenwich Village. Holahan was originally from Rochester, New York, and moved to New York City to work at Benton & Bowles, an advertising agency. Holahan's older sister was Elizabeth Holahan, a famous interior decorator with several historical restorations in New York State to her credit; her younger sister was aspiring actress Annie Holahan. She met Ackland in Dorset, where Holahan arrived to retrieve her sister, who had followed Llewelyn Powys, British novelist and essayist, and Ackland's neighbor, to England. From the correspondence between Holahan and Ackland, it appears that they were having an affair at the time. In May 1939 White accompanied Ackland to the New York pier after a visit, and there White met Holahan. At the end of 1945, White moved back to Middlebury, living at "The Patch", the house her grandmother, Martha Starkweather Wade, left her. Holahan, who would become her life partner, moved in with her. At the end of the 1940s, Holahan and White founded "White & Holahan, Books", a rare and used book business they ran from their home. In 1985 her companion Holahan died and White continued to live at "The Patch" till her own death.

In 1950 White was accepted into the B.Litt. program at University of Oxford, even though she did not have an undergraduate degree; she was accepted thanks to the research she had conducted on Anne Bradstreet. White graduated in 1953; her thesis, "The Life of Anne Bradstreet: The Tenth Muse", was published in 1971. In one of her analyses, White highlights how Bradstreet's poem, The Prologue, is divided into two parts: at the beginning Bradstreet laments her inferiority to male writers, while at the end she asserts her woman's right to express herself.

White died on December 11, 1994, and is buried at Middlebury Cemetery, Middlebury, together with Evelyn Holahan.
