= Henry Jodrell =

British politician

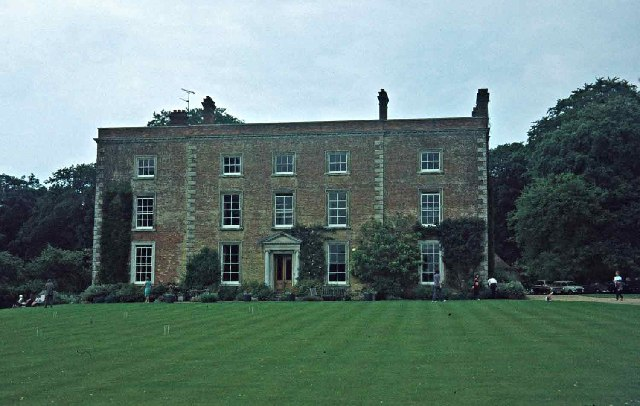
Bayfield Hall, Norfolk

Henry Jodrell (bapt. 30 May 1750 – 11 March 1814) was an English barrister and politician who served as a Member of Parliament.

He was a younger son of Paul Jodrell of Duffield, Derbyshire, the Solicitor-General to Frederick, Prince of Wales, and his wife, Elizabeth. Richard Paul Jodrell, (1745 – 1831), classical scholar and playwright, and Sir Paul Jodrell (died 1803), physician to the Nabob of Arcot, were his elder brothers. He was educated at Eton school and Lincoln's Inn, where he was called to the bar in 1773, and inherited Bayfield Hall, near the north Norfolk coast, from his mother.

He was Commissioner of Bankrupts 1783-97 and the Recorder of Great Yarmouth 1792–1813. He resigned the recordership in 1813 to avoid having to pass the death sentence on his wife's murderer.

He was MP for Great Yarmouth from 1796 to 1802, and MP for Bramber, Sussex from 1802 to 1812.

He is buried in Letheringsett with a memorial designed by John Bacon.

He married Johanna Elizabeth, daughter of John Weyland of Woodeaton, Oxfordshire. They had no children.

Parliament of Great Britain
Preceded by Stephens Howe; Lord Charles Townshend	Member of Parliament for Great Yarmouth; 1796 – 1800; With: William Loftus	Succeeded by Parliament of the United Kingdom
Parliament of the United Kingdom
Preceded by Parliament of Great Britain	Member of Parliament for Great Yarmouth; 1801 – 1802; With: William Loftus	Succeeded by Thomas Jervis; Sir Thomas Troubridge, Bt
Preceded by James Adams; John Henry Newbolt	Member of Parliament for Bramber; 1802 – 1812; With: George Manners-Sutton 1800–02; Richard Norman 1802–04; John Irving from 1804	Succeeded by William Wilberforce; John Irving
