= Norwich School (glassmakers) =

Medieval circle of stained glass makers

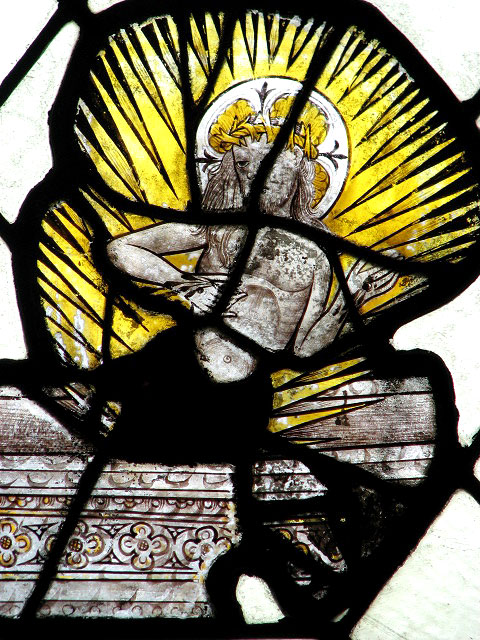
15th century Norwich glass fragment in St Nicholas, Blakeney

The Norwich School of glassmakers was a mediaeval Norwich-based community of stained glass makers, mostly active between the mid-14th century and the English Reformation, when much of the glass was destroyed as part of the general injunction against stained glass, shrines, roods, statues and bells. St Peter Mancroft retains an internationally important window of this era, elsewhere there are mainly fragments.

The black lines of the paintings were drawn with iron oxide from pin factories mixed with wine or urine, and the yellow tones were derived from silver nitrate. There were also characteristic stylistic elements from this group, including the distinctive 'Norwich' ears, eyes and hair, which differentiate Norwich from other glass-making areas such as York.

The school's generally light and uncomplicated style has stylised methods of depicting floors and countryside, including motifs resembling ears of barley, seaweed, chequers or pebbles. In common with other church craftsmen, the glass painters used a characteristic border design which resembled a holly leaf wrapped around a rod.

== General references ==
- "Medieval imaginations: literature and visual culture in the middle ages". Cambridge University. Retrieved 13 October 2011>
- Woodforde, Christopher (1950). The Norwich school of glass-painting in the fifteenth century. Oxford: Oxford U.P.
