= Dorothy Warren =

American writer, photographer and officer in the United States Army

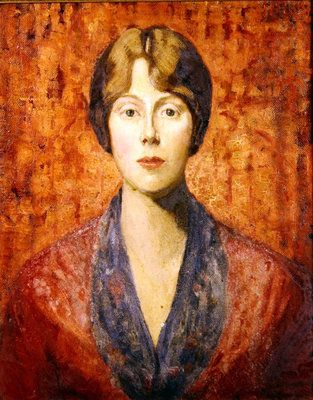
Dorothy Warren by Glyn Philpot

Dorothy Warren (September 29, 1905 – January 21, 2008) was an American writer, photographer and officer in the United States Army during World War II. She worked on training programs in the military, and after the war she served as the director of the New York House and School of Industry.

== Early life ==
Warren was born in White Plains, New York. Her parents were Charles Clark Warren and Blanche Allien Warren. Her father was a descendant of Thomas Leffingwell, founder of Norwich, Connecticut, and her mother was the granddaughter of William Moller, founder of Havemeyer & Moller, later the American Sugar Refining Company.

She graduated from New York City's Spence School in 1925 and then studied at the California School of Fine Arts and Columbia University.

== Career ==
From 1927 to 1931, she worked as a travel agent, and then worked in real estate management and brokerage for nine years. During World War II, she joined the Women's Army Auxiliary Corps in 1941 and became a major. She served in personnel offices and training centers and was a commanding officer, until she left military service in 1946.

Following the war, she developed a training program to expand the skill set of women who worked in offices. It was created for the New York House and School of Industry, where she was the director, in conjunction with state and federal Departments of Labor. She served on the board of various organizations, like United Presbyterian Church, Turtle Bay Music School and The Spence Alumnae Society. A photographer and artist, her works are included in the Metropolitan Museum of Art, Museum of the City of New York and New-York Historical Society collections. A preservationist, she was active with the Cooper Hewitt, Smithsonian Design Museum.

== Death ==
She died on January 21, 2008, in Manhattan at 102 years of age.

== Published works ==
- The Letters of Ruth Draper: Self-Portrait of an Actress, 1920–1956 Dorothy Warren (Editor), Sir John Gielgud (Foreword), 1979
- The World of Ruth Draper: A Portrait of an Actress, 1999
- Sacrificio: A Study in Heroism, a biography of Lauro De Bosis, 2009
