= Hindu Theatre =

First Bengali theatre

The Hindu Theatre was an early Bengali theatre in Calcutta, India, which opened in 1831. It was founded by Prasanna Kumar Tagore, a patron of Calcutta University.

The first performance staged by the Hindu Theatre was on 28 December 1831 in the garden house of Tagore's private residence. It featured Act 5 of Julius Caesar by William Shakespeare performed by local actors, as well as an English translation of the classical Sanskrit play Uttararamacarita by Bhavabhuti. The audience included prominent Bengalis and European officials, such as Sir Edward Ryan, chief justice of the Supreme Court in Calcutta. On 29 March 1832, the Hindu Theatre staged a work titled Nothing Superfluous. The actors wore elaborate costumes.
