= Louise Jermy =

British domestic servant and autobiographer (1877–1952)

- Born: Louise Withers; 30 January 1877; Romsey
- Died: 28 October 1952 (aged 75); Hoveton St John
- Occupations: domestic servant and laundry worker
- Known for: her 1934 autobiography
- Spouse: John Jermy
- Children: two

Louise Jermy born Louise Withers (30 January 1877 – 28 October 1952) was a British domestic servant and autobiographer.

== Life ==
Jermy was born in Romsey in Hampshire in 1877. She was adopted by her grandmothers after Jermy's mother died when she was a baby. Her grandmother, Sarah Medley, had worked in a laundry at "the big house" and Jermy lived with her at Romsey's Kent almhouses. The almshouses still exist and they date from a 1692 bequest.

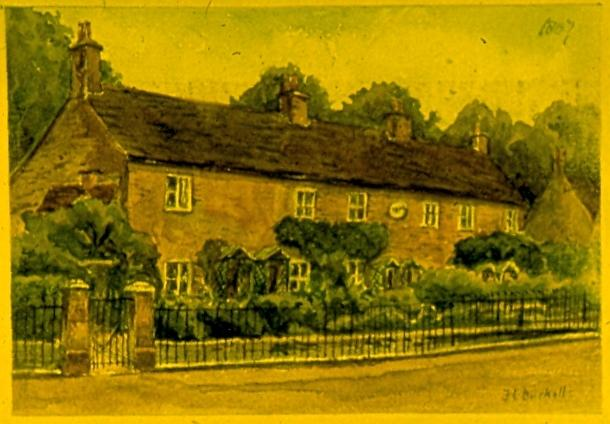
Romsey's Kents almhouses, by Fanny Buckell

She was taken from school to work in a laundry that was run by her father's new wife when she was eleven. Her step father had small businesses including a fish shop and a stonemasons. Her step mother beat her and by thirteen she had a permanent disability. She was sent to recuperate but by 1891 she was back in London learning to be a dressmaker. She never completed the apprenticeship as her stepmother wasn't happy with the low wages she was being paid.

In 1911 she began ten years of married life with John Jermy and they had two children. Her husband died in 1921 and she became, like her late husband, an agricultural worker.

Jermy's last work was, like her grandmother, as a laundress at the manor house. She comes to notice because of Hoveton Women's Institute. They encouraged her to write her life story and they arranged for it to be published. Memoirs of a Working Woman was published in 1934. She records that her stepmother had told her to never let a man enter a house if she was alone. She wrote that on one occasion a strange man forced his way into a house where she was alone but she was saved by a dog.

Jermy died in the parish of Hoveton St John. Extracts from her biography are included in Barbara Kanner's book, Women in English Social History.
