= St Nicholas, Blakeney =

13th-century church in North Norfolk, England

St Nicholas
- St Nicholas Church, Blakeney
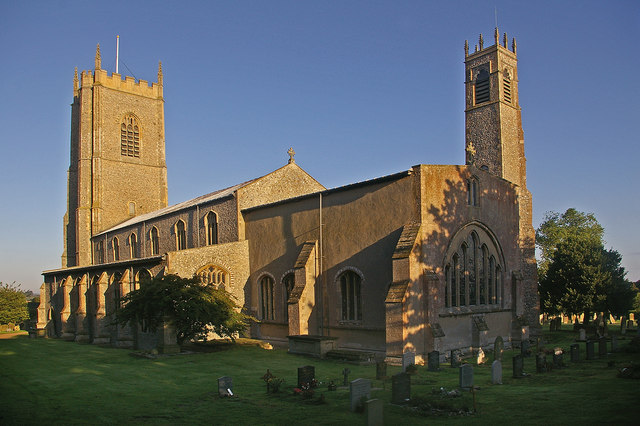
- View from south-east

- Location within Norfolk
- 52°57′4″N 1°1′29″E
- OS grid reference: TG 03309 43598
- Location: Blakeney, Norfolk
- Country: England
- Denomination: Church of England

History
- Status: Parish church

Architecture
- Functional status: Active
- Heritage designation: Grade I listed
- Designated: 1959
- Architectural type: Perpendicular; Early English

Administration
- Province: Canterbury
- Diocese: Norwich
- Deanery: Holt
- Parish: Blakeney

St Nicholas is the Anglican parish church of Blakeney, Norfolk, in the deanery of Holt and the Diocese of Norwich. The church was founded in the 13th century, but the greater part of the church dates from the 15th century when Blakeney was a seaport of some importance. Of the original structure only the chancel has survived rebuilding, perhaps owing to its link to a nearby Carmelite friary. An unusual architectural feature is a second tower, used as a beacon, at the east end (the church stands just inland from, and about 30 metres (98 ft) above, the small port). Other significant features are the vaulted chancel with a stepped seven-light lancet window, and the hammerbeam roof of the nave. St Nicholas is a nationally important building, with a Grade I listing for its exceptional architectural interest.

Much of the original church furniture was lost in the Reformation, but a late-Victorian restoration recreated something of the original appearance, as well as repairing and refacing the building. The Victorian woodwork was created to match the few older pieces that remained, or to follow a similar style; thus, the new wooden pulpit follows the themes of the medieval font. Of the stained glass smashed in the Reformation only fragments have been recovered, and these have been incorporated in a window in the north aisle of the church. Nine Arts and Crafts windows by James Powell and Sons are featured on the east and south sides of the church, and the north porch has two modern windows of predominantly blue colour. St Nicholas contains some notable memorials, including several plaques for the Blakeney lifeboats and their crews, and much pre-Reformation graffiti, particularly depictions of ships. The location of the latter suggests that they were votive in nature, although the saint concerned is now unknown.

== History ==
=== Foundation to 1547 ===
St Nicholas is the parish church of Blakeney, Norfolk, a small English town with a history dating back to at least early Neolithic times. It was one of a number of small ports opening onto the sheltered inlet of Blakeney Haven, and exported a range of products including fish, grain, and timber. In the Domesday Book of 1086 the town is recorded under the name "Esnuterle" (Snitterley); the present-day name first appears in 1340.

Domesday recorded an early church at Snitterley, but its location is unknown, and it may not have been the present site of St Nicholas. There are scheduled monument and Grade II listed ruins of a medieval building in the salt marshes north of the present town described as "Blakeney Chapel", but, despite the name, it now seems likely that this was a domestic dwelling rather than a religious edifice. Another possible chapel site east of the Glaven was shown on an 1835 map, but there is no documentation to support that identification.

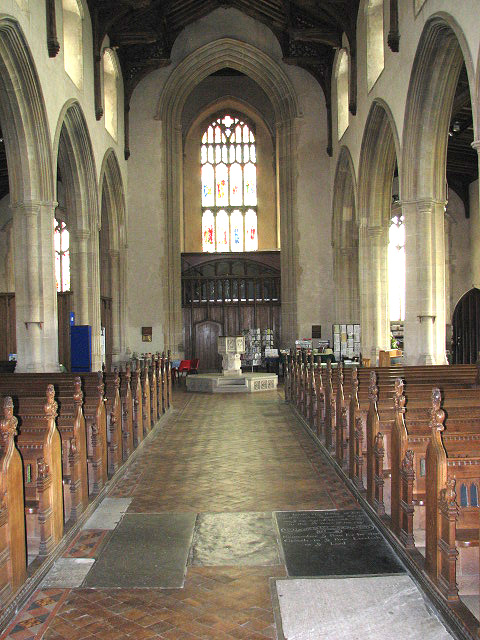
The nave, looking west

The nearby Carmelite friary had its own church by 1321, built on land donated by tenants of William de Roos, "that the Carmelite friars, by the King's licence, and that of Sir William Roos, might inhabit therein for ever, and might build a chapel". The friars were also given 100 marks to build their church, in return for which they undertook "to pray for the good estate of the said Sir William Roos and his Lady Maud ... and to have and to hold that lord and lady, and their heirs, for their principal founders".

The original building on the present site was constructed in the late 13th or early 14th century, at around the same time as the friary, which was founded in about 1296. Its hilltop location is unusual for the area; most nearby churches are built on mounds near water. The new church was dedicated to Saint Nicholas, the patron saint of sailors, and the living was first recorded as being in the gift of Sir John de Cockfield, passing to his Bacon descendants before its acquisition by the Abbot and Convent of Langley in 1375. The abbey controlled more than 60 Norfolk parishes, and the living of Blakeney was within its gift for the next sixty years, ending with the dissolution of the abbey in 1435. The patronage seems then to have passed to the Earl of Sussex, but quickly transferred to John Calthorpe, a descendant of the original founder, John Cockfield, and it remained with his family until 1922. Sir Alfred Jodrell then acquired the patronage, bequeathing it to Keble College, Oxford on his death in 1956. Since 1989, the benefice has been in the gift of Keble College, and the Bishop of Norwich.

Blakeney gained its market charter in 1222, and by the early 15th century it was one of the few ports permitted to trade in horses, gold and silver, through "merchants sworn by oath to the king", which contributed to the town's growing wealth. Few Early English churches survive in Norfolk owing to extensive rebuilding amid the prosperity of the 15th century, and the thriving port of Blakeney was no exception. Only the chancel avoided major reconstruction in 1434, probably because of its association with the Carmelite friary; John Calthorpe specified in his will of 1530 that he was to buried "in the White ffryes of Sniterlie [Blakeney] in the myddys of the chancel". The Perpendicular nave and the 31 m (104 ft) west tower were part of the 1434 rebuilding, but the unusual second, slender, tower at the north-east corner of the church was of a later date.

=== Reformation and after ===
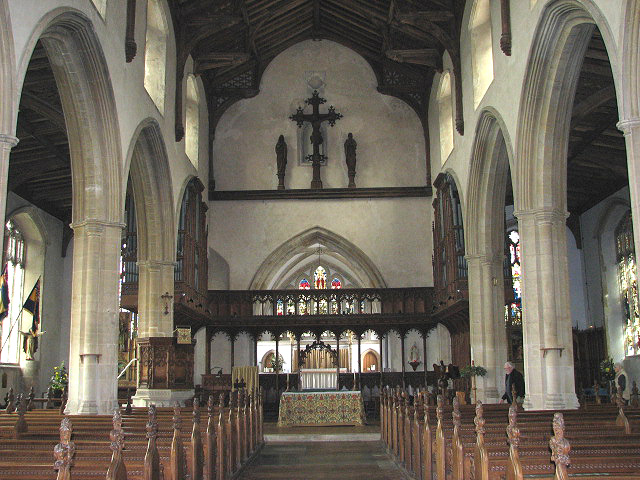
The nave, looking east towards the chancel

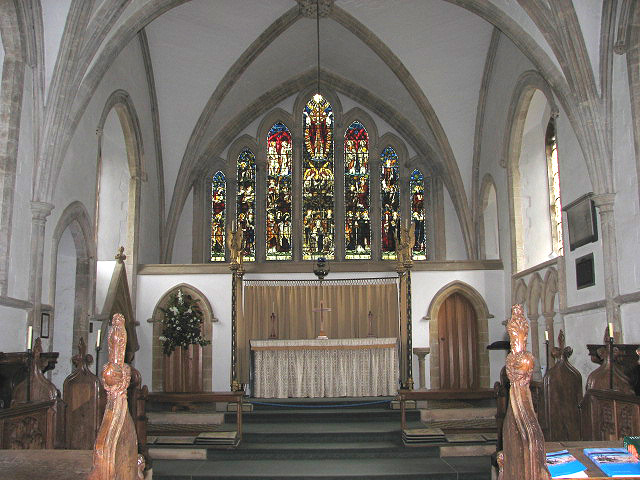
The 13th-century chancel

The English Reformation inevitably affected St Nicholas. Edward VI's 1547 injunction decreed that all images in churches were to be dismantled or destroyed, including stained glass, shrines, roods, statues, and bells, and altars were to be dismantled and replaced by wooden tables. Blakeney did not escape these changes; an Inventory of Church Goods of 1552 and official visitations later in the century revealed that the chancel was falling into decay and "the church porche defiled with cattel". The reports continue "the pavement is much broken ... the walls are in decaie ... east window is much broken ... the chancel needs paving" – it was even alleged that graves were left uncovered. The rector from 1590 to 1621, Jacob Poynter, and his curate, Mr Aldriche, were keen Puritan reformers who refused to wear the surplice or use the Book of Common Prayer, and seemed to have had little concern for the fabric of the church. One positive outcome of the Reformation was that registers were to be kept in every church to record baptisms, marriages and burials; the Blakeney registers are very largely complete from 1538.

By 1717, the local population seems to have been very homogeneous in terms of belief: "Persons, servants included, above the age of sixteen, the men chiefly sea-faring are supposed to be rather above three hundred. Papist none. Protestant dissenter none". Nevertheless, in 1854 there were Non-conformist chapels of three denominations, of which only the Methodist remains.

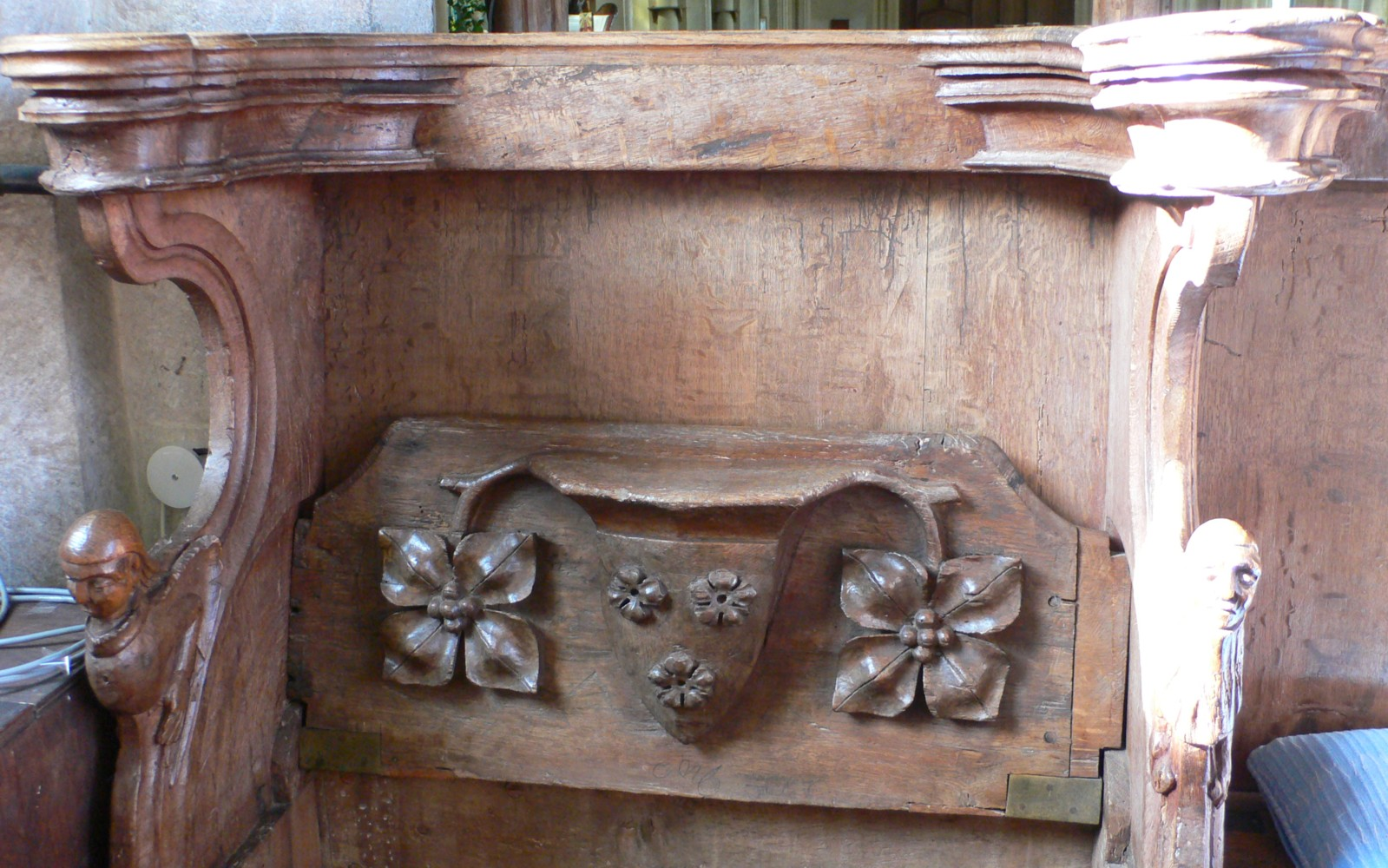
A chancel stall with a misericord to rest on

The church was originally constructed of flint with stone dressings, but was substantially refaced with knapped flint in the 1880s; the tower was restored at the same time. A wall was built behind the altar in 1886 to create a separate sacristy for storing vestments and other items. The west tower was restored again in 1989, and the current doors to the sacristy were added in the same year.

Electric lighting was installed in 1938 and an outer door for the north porch added in 1962. Major renovations were carried out from 1981 to 1983; these comprised repairs to the north aisle roof and the east tower, plastering and limewashing of the chancel, replacement of the old electrical and heating systems, and minor work on the organ. The most recent round of restoration was the 2000 reflooring of the nave, installation of a vestry, toilet and kitchen, a new heating system with a detached boiler house, and reglazing of the north porch. Because of the remoteness of the altar from the congregation, a second altar was erected between the parclose screens (extensions forward from the ends of the rood screen) to enable a more intimate celebration of the Eucharist. St Nicholas was designated as a Grade I listed building in 1959, which recognizes it as a building of exceptional interest.

The benefice has expanded during the long history of its church. Cockthorpe and Little Langham parish was added in 1606, Glandford in 1743, Wiveton in 1922, and Cley in 1935. The parish is in the deanery of Holt, the Diocese of Norwich and the Province of Canterbury. The rector originally received tithes to support himself and the church, but this was later replaced by rent from the glebe (church lands). Rector Pointer, for example, received tithes and also had the income from the sales of his corn and saffron crops. The state had supported poorer clergy since the introduction of Queen Anne's Bounty in 1704, but since 1947 the Church Commissioners have been responsible for arranging the stipends and pensions of Anglican priests.

== Description ==
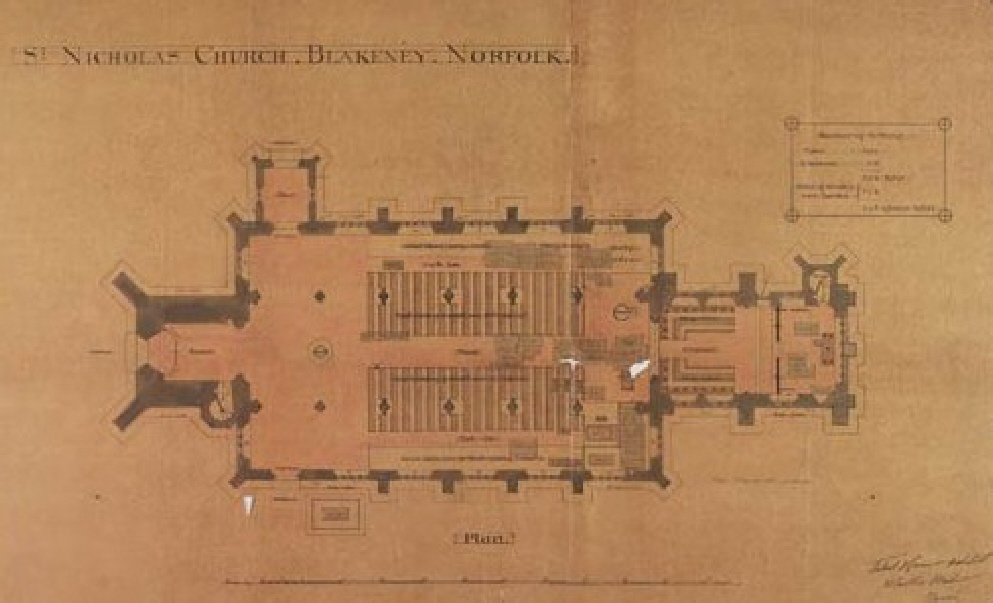
1887 groundplan for the late-19th-century restoration work

St Nicholas, Blakeney, is a large Gothic parish church with an aisled nave, a deep chancel of two bays, a large tower at the western end, and a smaller tower at the eastern end, to the north of the chancel. The north porch was rebuilt in 1896.

The west tower is surmounted with crenellations and pinnacles and is supported by stepped buttresses at each corner. The buttresses are constructed from flint and stone, and have arched insets on the faces. They rest on stone plinths, each bearing carved shields, that on the north buttress with an inaccurate rendering of the arms of the see, and the other with a cross and a dolphin. The tower has three Perpendicular windows in the belfry and a large Perpendicular window in its western face, giving light to the west end of the nave.

The nave is 30 m (100 ft) long and 14 m (47 ft), and is separated from the aisles on north and south sides by arcades of six bays. It is lit by Perpendicular windows, each aisle bay window having four lights apiece, with three-light windows in the clerestory above. The nave's oak and chestnut hammerbeam roof dates from the 15th century, and features carved angels on the hammers. These rest on arched braces, except above each window, where the hammers rest on corbels instead. The only trace of the earlier 13th-century nave is the reuse of some older stone, mainly in the north aisle, and the raised chancel walls, and some Purbeck Marble fragments beneath the west tower.

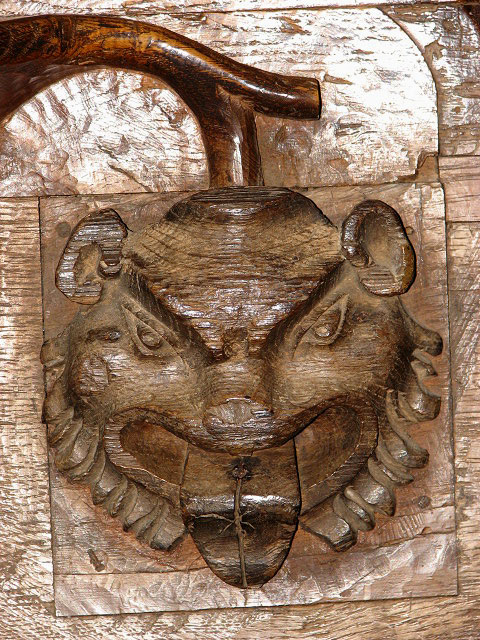
Carved end of a misericord

The Lady Chapel in the south aisle and St Thomas' Chapel in the north aisle were dedicated to St Mary and St Thomas of Canterbury respectively. They fell into disuse in the Reformation, but were restored in the 1880s.

The 13th-century chancel has two rib vaulted bays, making it one of only six extant Early English vaulted chancels. Its walls were raised in the 15th century by constructing a chamber above the vaulting using stone from the demolished 13th-century nave, but, from the outside, this end of the church is still lower than the western section. Internally, the chancel vault is much lower than the adjacent nave because of the room above. It has three 15th-century Perpendicular windows down each side, and is notable for the unusual east window with seven stepped lights, a feature found in only two other Early English churches, Lincoln Cathedral and St Martins in Ockham. The chancel contains three simple sedilia, or priest's seats, with trefoil arches and round columns. The sacristry behind the altar has a small lancet window, and the chamber above the chancel, which is floored only by the curved upper surface of the vault below, is lit by a single two-light window.

The polygonal eastern tower has stepped buttresses at its corners and louvred belfry windows just below the parapet. Its origins are not entirely clear, but it was possibly originally a turret for stairs leading to a room over the chancel, later extended upwards as an aesthetic enhancement and to act as a beacon for mariners. Its date is uncertain, but it is much later than the chancel. Although its lack of height compared to the west tower has led to some questioning of its suitability as a beacon, it has been suggested that lining up the two towers guided ships into the navigable channel between the inlet's sandbanks; this is the "leading light" practice later achieved using pairs of lighthouses at different levels.

== Furnishings and fixtures ==
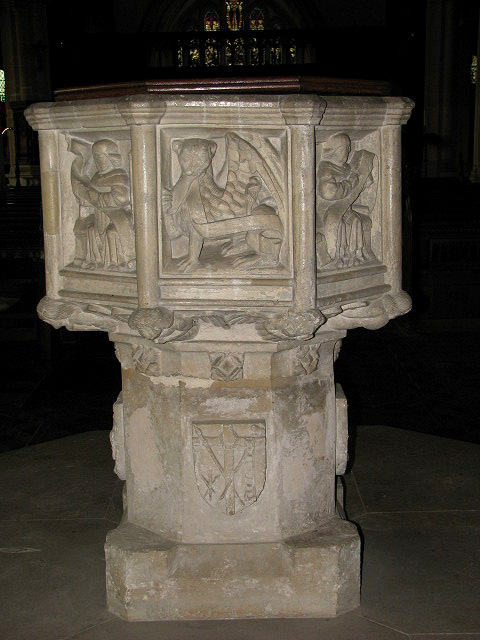
The font

The octagonal font dates from the 15th century; its carved panels alternate images of the symbols of the Four Evangelists with seated figures of the Doctors of the Church (Saint Ambrose, Saint Augustine, Saint Jerome, and Pope Gregory I). The central column carries shields depicting the Instruments of the Passion and the Holy Wounds. The eastern shield is unusual in that a sword is shown with an ear stuck to it. This refers to the story of Saint Peter striking off the ear of Malchus, the High Priest's servant, in the garden of Gethsemane.

Most East Anglian churches lost their medieval furnishings in the upheavals of the Reformation, and Blakeney is no exception. Apart from the hammerbeam roof, there is little original wood work in the nave; a few benches in the aisles, the fleur-de-lis-decorated beam supporting the rood, and two panels of the rood screen. The chancel retains four of its original choir stalls with their misericords, which are decorated with head and leaf motifs on the arms. St Nicholas benefited from sympathetic restoration in the late 19th and early 20th century. The new stalls and misericords match the style of the old, and the 1886 pulpit echoes the font, with the Instruments of the Passion on the stone stand, and the twelve Apostles carved on the woodwork. The pulpit has been described as "Victorian craftsmanship of matchless quality". The north porch was restored in 1896, and in the following year the west tower was repaired, and pews of a 15th-century pattern placed in the nave.

1910 saw the restoration of the rood screen in a style consistent with that of the two ancient panels, the reconstruction of the rood loft, and the installation of a Norman and Beard two-manual organ with more than a thousand pipes. The organ pipes are above the parclose screens; the bellows, wind chest and electric blower are concealed in the chamber above the chancel. The stalls with their misericords were restored in 1913. The rood crucifix, flanked by St Mary and St John, came from Germany in 1913.

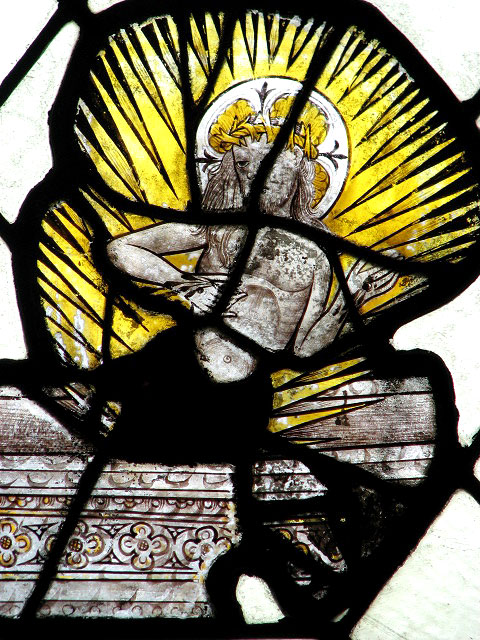
Fifteenth-century glass panel

Much church plate, such as the chalice and pyx had been confiscated, sold or stolen in the heat of the Reformation. In the more tolerant climate of Elizabethan England, the excesses of extreme Protestantism were curbed by centralised control of the Church of England, the Act of Uniformity and the Book of Common Prayer. Most churches then had to buy a new chalice; Blakeney's was purchased in 1567, and exchanged for another in 1716. One lost treasure is a "Map of the World" (Mappa Mundi et Chroniculum Mundi), which was recorded as present in the church in 1368. This is thought more likely to be a version of Ranulf Higdon's Polychronicon, a geographical text, than a true map like the Hereford Mappa Mundi.

The stained glass is mostly late-19th-century Arts and Crafts by James Powell and Sons. Powell, coincidentally based at Whitefriars, a former Carmelite friary in London, used leading members of the movement such as Edward Burne-Jones as designers, and his nine windows at Blakeney are regarded as fine examples of his work. The east window dating from 1895 represents the Te Deum, and the south windows, glazed in 1900, tell the story of the early British church. Some 15th-century fragments of the original Norwich School glass that had been buried in the churchyard during the Reformation were incorporated into one of the otherwise plain windows in the north aisle in 1938, showing "Christ rising from the tomb", with six figures above. Five of the figures are angels; there would have been nine originally, one for each order. The sixth image depicts a female saint wearing a crown. The angel's legs are clothed in "feather tights", believed to have been derived from costumes worn in medieval religious plays. The north porch is flanked by two blue-themed modern stained glass windows by Jane Gray from 2002, one dedicated to the RAF, the other to the Royal National Lifeboat Institution (RNLI). The stained glass, taken as a whole, has been described as showing a "phenomenal standard of composition and artistry ... Few churches contain such a treasury." The current reredos and altar were erected in 1923, as was a wooden war memorial in the north aisle.

Most churches prior to the Reformation had painted walls, often with murals; these were whitewashed by the reformers, and often religious texts or the Ten Commandments replaced the images. These inscriptions were in turn obliterated under the Catholic Queen Mary I. At Blakeney, as elsewhere, the formerly coloured walls are now the plain white typical of English churches.

== Memorials ==
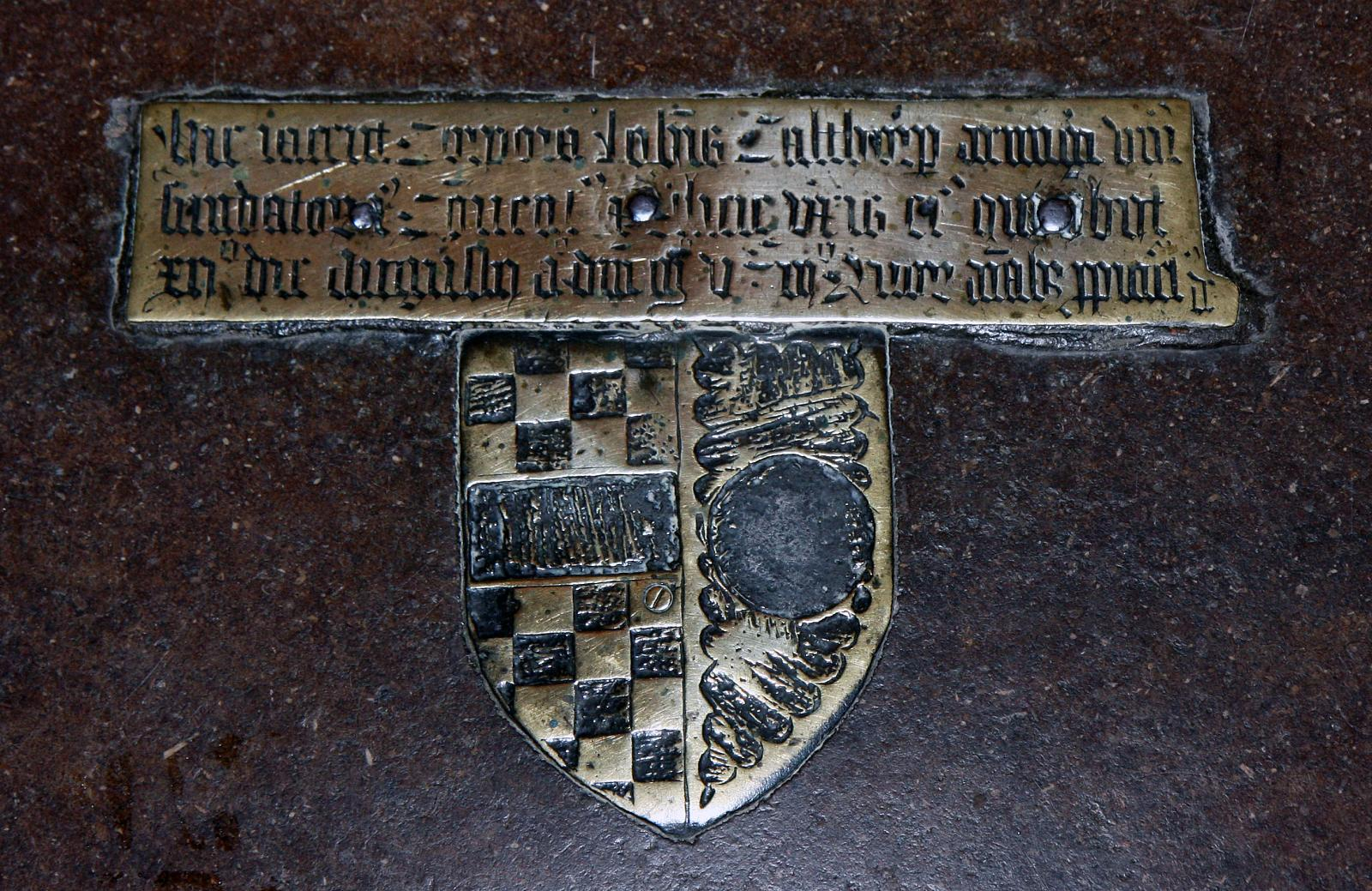
John Calthorpe's "synfull body" lies under this plaque

John Calthorpe's "synfull body" lies at the eastern end of the nave under a marble gravestone and a brass plaque that carries his arms and a Latin inscription describing him as uni fundatorum fratum convent, "a founder [benefactor] of the convent of friars". It is possible that he was originally buried in the chancel of the Carmelite friary, as he requested, but was re-interred in the nave of St Nicholas at the Dissolution. A number of other stones carry standard tags in Latin or English requesting prayers or simply stating the identity of the internee, but Sir John Smyth's 1460 memorial enjoined "As I am that shall you be, Pray for the sowle of me".

Blakeney was a lifeboat station from around 1825 to 1924. Various wall plaques commemorate the boats' rescues and crew losses from 1862, when the RNLI took over the running of the service, up to the station's closure. There are two blue wooden boards from the RNLI listing the earlier lifeboats and their achievements; the Brightwell (1862), another Brightwell (1863), the Zaccheus Burroughs (1891), and the Hettie (1873). Next to these is a stone plaque listing the rescues from 1877 to 1924, including those of the last lifeboat, the Caroline (1908), and further along the north aisle a painting of George Long, coxswain of the Caroline, is placed above the record of its most famous rescues on consecutive days on 7 and 8 January 1918, when 30 people were saved from two steamers in a storm. A large wooden board acts as a war memorial, listing those locals who died in various military engagements. The clock in the west tower was donated by a Mrs Cooke in 1945 in memory of her late husband and sons.

== Medieval graffiti ==
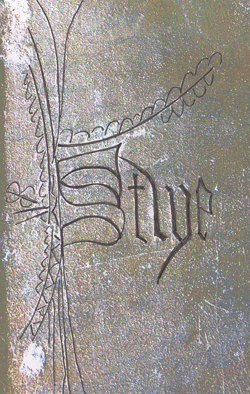
A decorated letter

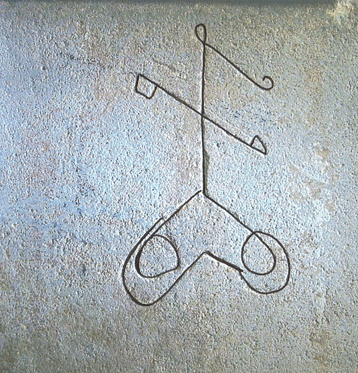
A mason's mark

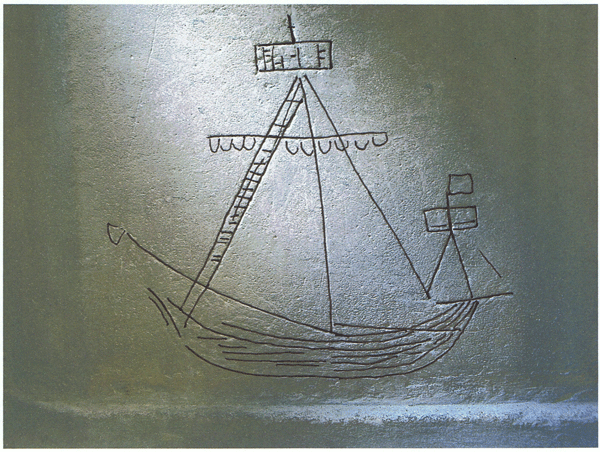
A ship graffito

The interiors of most Norfolk churches contain much pre-Reformation graffiti, unless they have been heavily limewashed or resurfaced. The churches of the Glaven ports in general, and Blakeney in particular, conform to this pattern. St Nicholas has an extensive array of prayers, merchant's marks and other symbols, but is notable for the large number of depictions of ships, at least 30, heavily concentrated in the nave towards the eastern end of the south aisle. There is a side altar there of unknown dedication, and an empty niche that would have once held the image of a saint. The pillars were painted red in the Middle Ages, and ship images scratched into the soft, chalky stone would have been much more conspicuous than they are now. It is likely that the images, mostly of smaller ships, were created as votive offerings by the seafaring inhabitants of the port. The carving of ship graffiti in religious buildings is a tradition in ports going back to the Bronze Age, and has been found across Europe.

Mason's marks were used by the stonemason to identify his work, and in the days of the medieval craft guilds may also have had mystical or religious significance. In England, the use of these marks became widespread after the Norman Conquest. Similarly, merchants had their own marks to identify their products, and these frequently appeared on houses, gravestones and church walls.

== People ==
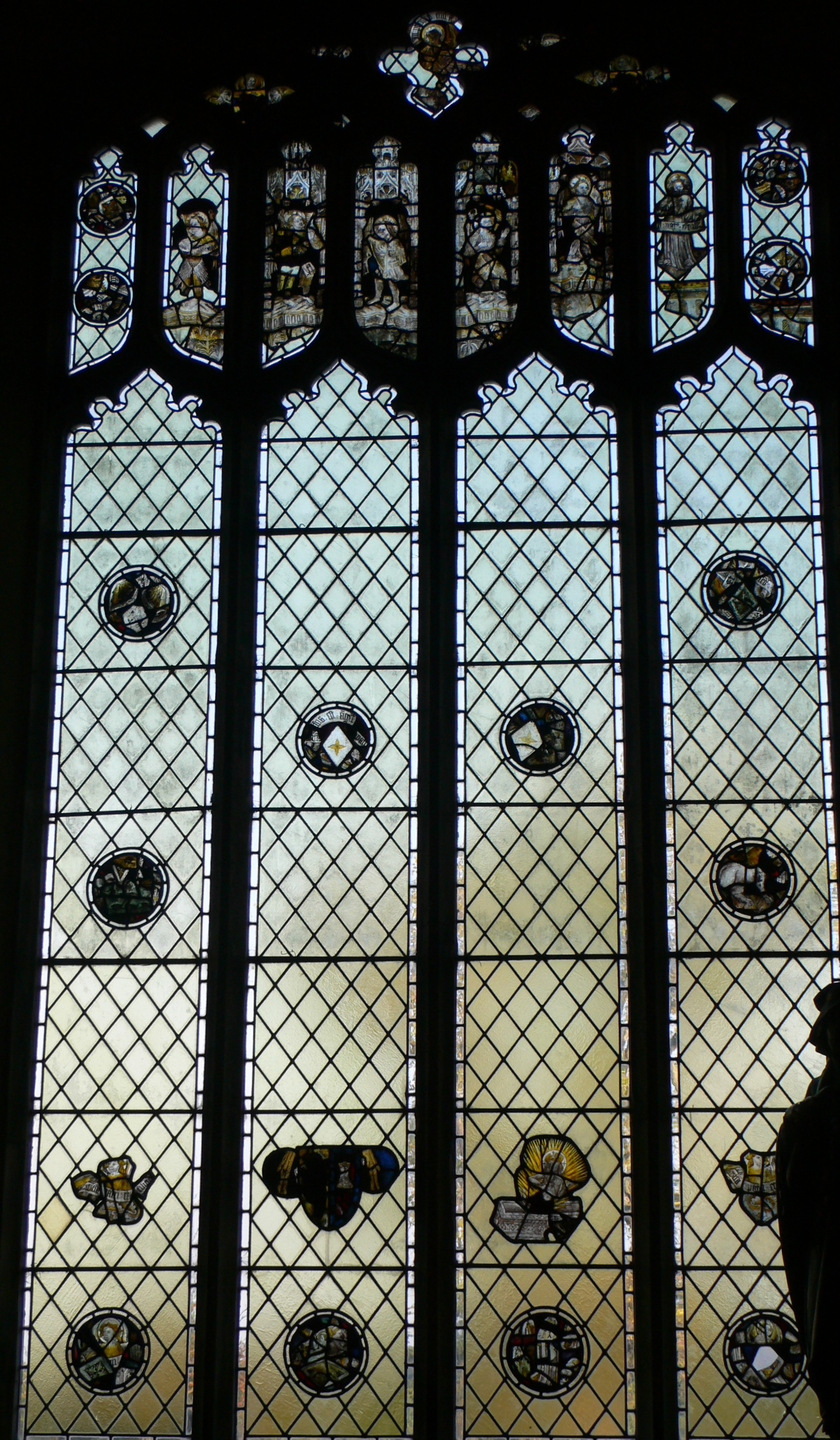
The medieval glass fragments in this window show angels in feather tights in the top panels.

The long patronage of the Calthorpes under their various incarnations as the Lords Calthorpe, Gough-Calthorpes and Anstruther-Gough-Calthorpes has already been noted. A Henry Calthorpe was rector from 1743 to 1781, and was followed by Richard Thomas Gough, who held the living for 43 years. Gough and Richard Henry Tillard, incumbent from 1858 to 1906, are commemorated by plaques in the chancel. Of the other rectors, Mowbray O'Rorke had been Bishop of Accra from 1913, but accepted the Blakeney living in 1924, remaining until he retired in 1939, and Clifford Leofric Purdy (Jim) Bishop, rector from 1949 to 1953, rose to become Bishop of Malmesbury from 1962.

The graveyard, as in many coastal parish churches, contains mainly local people and seafarers. Several stones bear the surname "Long", a name carried by five of the crew of the Caroline on its epic rescues in January 1918. A notable outsider buried here is Sir Henry "Tim" Birkin a leading British racing driver and one of the "Bentley Boys" of the 1920s. Three war graves commemorate one British Army soldier of World War I and two from World War II.

== Services and congregation ==
The rector of this Church of England parish as of 2019 is the Rev Richard Lawry. The benefice rotates its services among its five constituent churches, with typically five services in total on Sundays, and two mid-week Holy Communions. As with most Anglican churches in England, the congregation is mainly elderly, although there are monthly family services focussed on children. There is also a monthly laying on of hands for healing, and sometimes other variants from the standard format involving music or Taizé-influenced worship. The parish accepts the diocese's guidance on permitting baptism and marriage in church after a divorce, and claims to work closely with its Catholic and Methodist neighbours.

St Nicholas is also used for non-religious events such as flower festivals, craft workshops and musical performances, and it has won diocesan tourism awards for its in-church information facilities. The church appeared in Simon Jenkins’ book, 1000 Best Churches, where it was described as having "a sense of vigorous activity" and as "a rare example of what every large parish church should aspire to being, also a community centre, market place and museum". It was also featured in the Daily Telegraph's list of 100 favourite churches, and a Norfolk tourism website rated it one of the top ten churches in the county.

== Cited texts ==
- Birks, Chris (2003). Report on an archaeological evaluation at Blakeney Freshes, Cley next the Sea: report No. 808 (PDF). Norwich: Norfolk Archaeological Unit.
- Blomefield, Francis; Parkin, Charles (1808). An Essay towards a topographical history of the county of Norfolk: volume 9. Kings Lynn: William Whittingham.
- Brandon, Raphael; Brandon, Joshua Arthur (1860). An analysis of Gothick architecture: volume 1. London: W Kent and Co. (Late D Bogue).
- Chambers, John (1829). A general history of the county of Norfolk: volume 1. London: J Stacy.
- Child, Mark (2008). Discovering churches and churchyards. Colchester: Osprey Publishing. ISBN 978-0-7478-0659-2.
- Haigh, Christopher (1987). The English Reformation revised. Cambridge: Cambridge University Press. ISBN 978-0-521-33631-4.
- Hinde, Thomas (1997). The Domesday Book, England's heritage, then and now. Canterbury: Tiger Books. ISBN 978-1-85833-440-0.
- Jenkins, Simon (2000). England's Thousand Best Churches. London: Penguin. ISBN 978-0-14-029795-9.
- Knowles, John Alder (1936). Essays in the history of the York school of glass-painting. London: Society for Promoting Christian Knowledge.
- Linnell, Charles Lawrence Scruton (1984). Blakeney Church. Cotton, Suffolk: Ashlock.
- Loades, David (2003). Elizabeth I: The golden reign of Gloriana. London: The National Archives. ISBN 978-1-903365-43-4.
- Nye, Thelma M (1965). Parish church architecture. London: Batsford.
- Pevsner, Nikolaus; Wilson, Bill (2002). The Buildings Of England Norfolk I: Norwich and North-East Norfolk. New Haven and London: Yale University Press. ISBN 978-0-300-09607-1.
- Robinson, Geoffey H (c. 2006). St Nicholas, Blakeney. Norwich: Geoffrey H Robinson.
- Robinson, Geoffey H (2010). Glorious heritage of Norfolk: volume 5. Syderstone: Black Five Publications.
- Taylor, Richard (2003). How to read a church. London: Rider. ISBN 978-1-84413-053-5.
- Wachsmann, Shelley (1997). Seagoing ships and seamanship in the Bronze Age Levant. TAMU College Station: Texas A & M University Press. ISBN 978-0-89096-709-6.
- White, Francis (1854). History, gazetteer and directory of Norfolk, and the city and county of the city of Norwich. Sheffield: Francis White & Co.
- Whiting, Robert (2010). The Reformation of the English parish church. Cambridge: Cambridge University Press. ISBN 978-0-521-76286-1.
