= Richard Paul Jodrell =

English scholar and playwright (1745–1831)

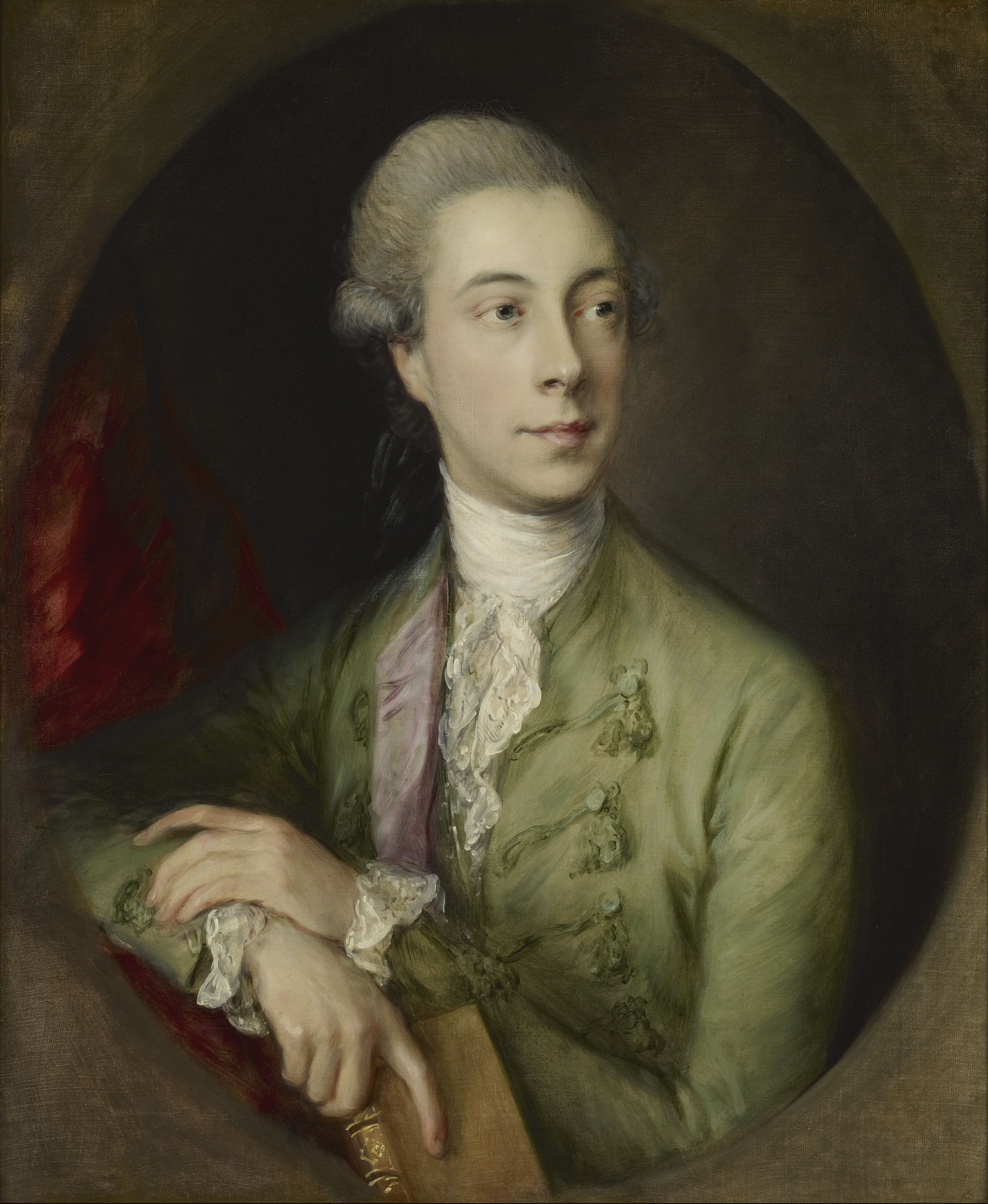
Richard Paul Jodrell, portrait c.1774 by Thomas Gainsborough (Frick Collection)

Richard Paul Jodrell (13 November 1745 – 26 January 1831) was a classical scholar and playwright.

== Life ==
His parents were Paul Jodrell of Duffield, Derbyshire, Solicitor General to Frederick Prince of Wales, and his wife Elizabeth, daughter of Richard Warner, of North Elmham in Norfolk. His brothers were Paul Jodrell and Henry Jodrell.

Jodrell was born 13 November 1745; and, having lost his father in 1751, lived in possession of his paternal estates for nearly 80 years. He was educated at Eton College and at Hertford College, Oxford; and his attachment to his classical studies was evinced by his compositions in the Musae Etonenses, and by subsequent more laborious publications. To the supplementary Notes of Potter's Aeschylus, printed in 1778, he was a contributor; in 1781 he published, in two volumes 8vo., Illustrations of Euripides, on the Ion and Bacchae; and in 1790 another volume, On the Akestis, the modern drama, also, as well as the ancient, shared Jodrell's attention. A Widow and no Widow, a dramatic piece of three acts by biro, was acted at the Haymarket in 1779, and printed in 1780, 8vo. It appears, from The Monthly Review (vol. Ixv. p. 233.), that living characters were depicted among the dramatis personae: "the artist is a coarse painter, but commonly hits off a striking likeness". At the same theatre, in 1783, was performed with success his Seeing is Believing, in one act, printed in 1786. His tragedy, called "The Persian Heroine", having been rejected by the managers of the two great theatres (the particulars of which transactions are given in the Literary Anecdotes, vol. ix. p. 2.), was printed in 1786, 8vo. and 4 to. In the following year he published "Select Dramatic Pieces; some of which have been acted on provincial theatres, others have been written for private performance and country amusement"; and consisting of, Who's Afraid? a farce; the Boarding School Miss, a comedy; One and All, a farce; The Disguise, a comedy (It was the first stage-play in Bengali produced in Kolkata was by a Russian adventurer-cum-Indologist, Gerasim Lebedev, in 1795); The Musico, a farce; and The Bulse, a dramatic piece. He also published in 4to. 1785, The Knight and Friars, an historic tale, from Heywood's Tuvelvcelov", - "the work of three mornings in the Christmas holidays."

In 1784 Jodrell became a member of the club founded at the Essex Head, for the purpose of cheering the declining days of Dr Johnson; and, it is believed, that he and Chamberlain Clark, who died a few days before him, were "positively the last" survivors of that celebrated literary fraternity. Jodrell was elected a Fellow of the Royal Society in 1772, and of the Society of Antiquaries in 1784. He was created D.C.L. at Oxford, 4 July. 1793.

At the general election 1790, Jodrell was returned as one of the barons in Parliament for Seaford; but by the decision of a committee, which was not given until the second session, he was declared not duly elected on 19 March 1792. However, when Sargent was made Clerk of the Ordnance in January 1794, he was re-elected for the same place; but after the clerkship's dissolution in 1796 he did not again sit in the House.

With advancing years, Jodrell suffered mental deterioration, and by the mid-1820s he was fully incapacitated. It became necessary to throw legal protection over his person and property, which was undertaken, after the proper investigation, before a commission de lunatico inquirendo.

He died in Portland Place, London on 26 January 1831.

== Family ==
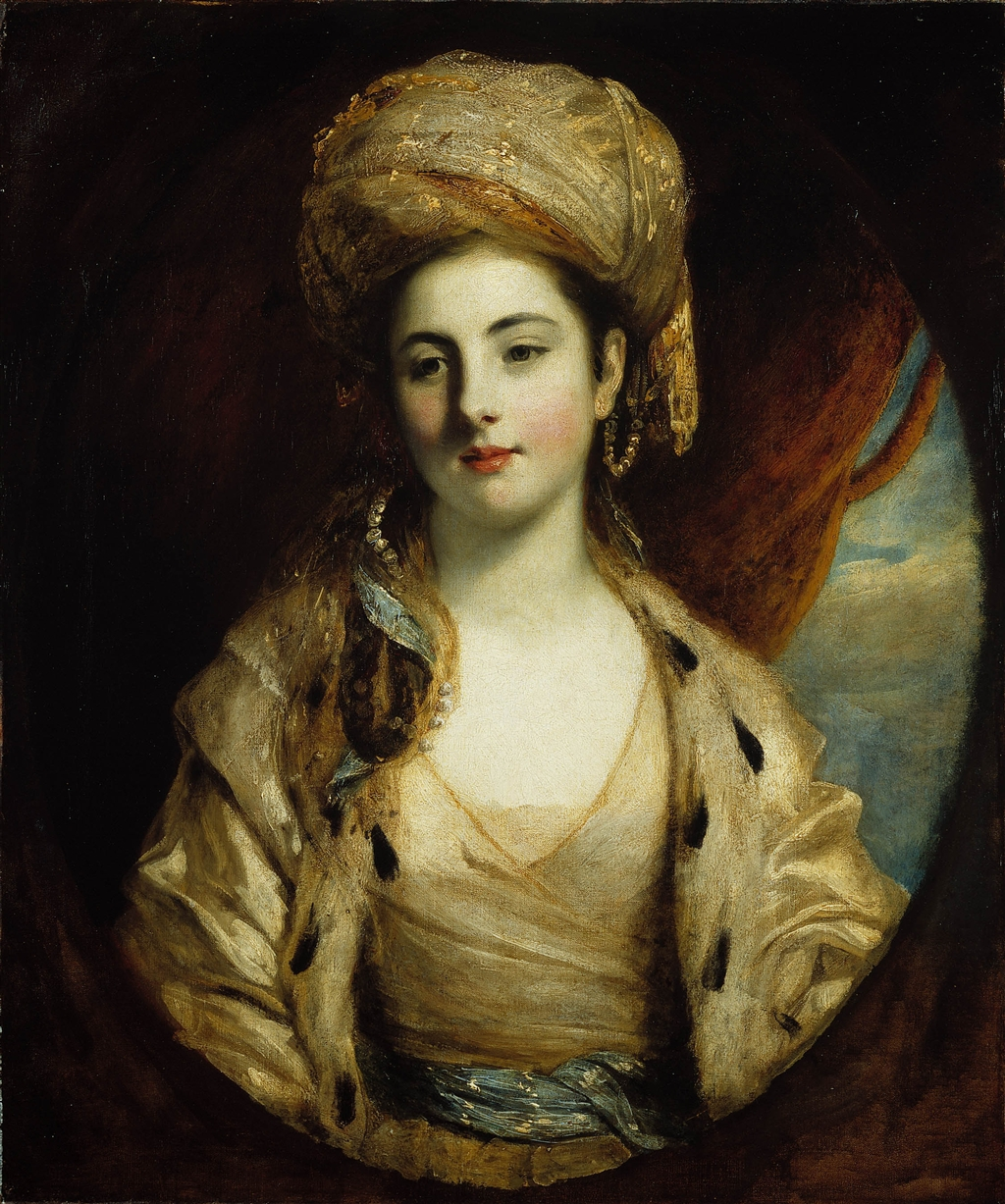
Vertue Jodrell, portrait c.1775 by Joshua Reynolds (Detroit Institute of Arts)

Jodrell married 19 May. 1772, his second cousin, Vertue, eldest daughter and co-heiress of Edward Hase, of Salle, in Norfolk, who was the second son of John Hase, of Great Melton, in Norfolk, by Mary, daughter of Edward Lombe, of Weston, and aunt to Jodrell's mother. By this lady, who died 23 May. 1806, he had five sons and two daughters: 1. Paul, and 2. Paul, who both died in infancy; 3. Sir Richard Paul Jodrell, of Magdalen Hall, Oxford, M. A. 1806, who succeeded to his baronetcy in 1817, on the death of his great uncle Sir John Lombe, who took that name instead of Hase in 1762, and was created a Baronet in 1784; he married, in 1814, Amelia Caroline King, daughter of the Earl of Kingston, and has several children; 4. Edward Jodrell, of Trinity College, Oxford, M.A. 1811; he married, in 1812, Mary, fourth daughter of W. Lowndes Stone, of Brightwell, in Oxfordshire, Esq., and has issue; 5. the Rev. Sheldon Jodrell, of Trinity College, Cambridge, M.A. 1815, Rector of Saxlingham in Norfolk; 6. Sophia; and, 7. Louisa (twin with Sophia), who was married to Richard Jennings, and died in 1826.

Parliament of Great Britain
| Preceded by Sir Godfrey Webster, Bt; Henry Flood | Member of Parliament for Seaford; 1790 – 1792; With: John Sargent | Succeeded by John Sargent; John Tarleton |
| Preceded by John Sargent; John Tarleton | Member of Parliament for Seaford; 1794 – 1796; With: John Tarleton | Succeeded by Charles Rose Ellis; George Ellis |
