= Jermy baronets =

Extinct English title created in 1663

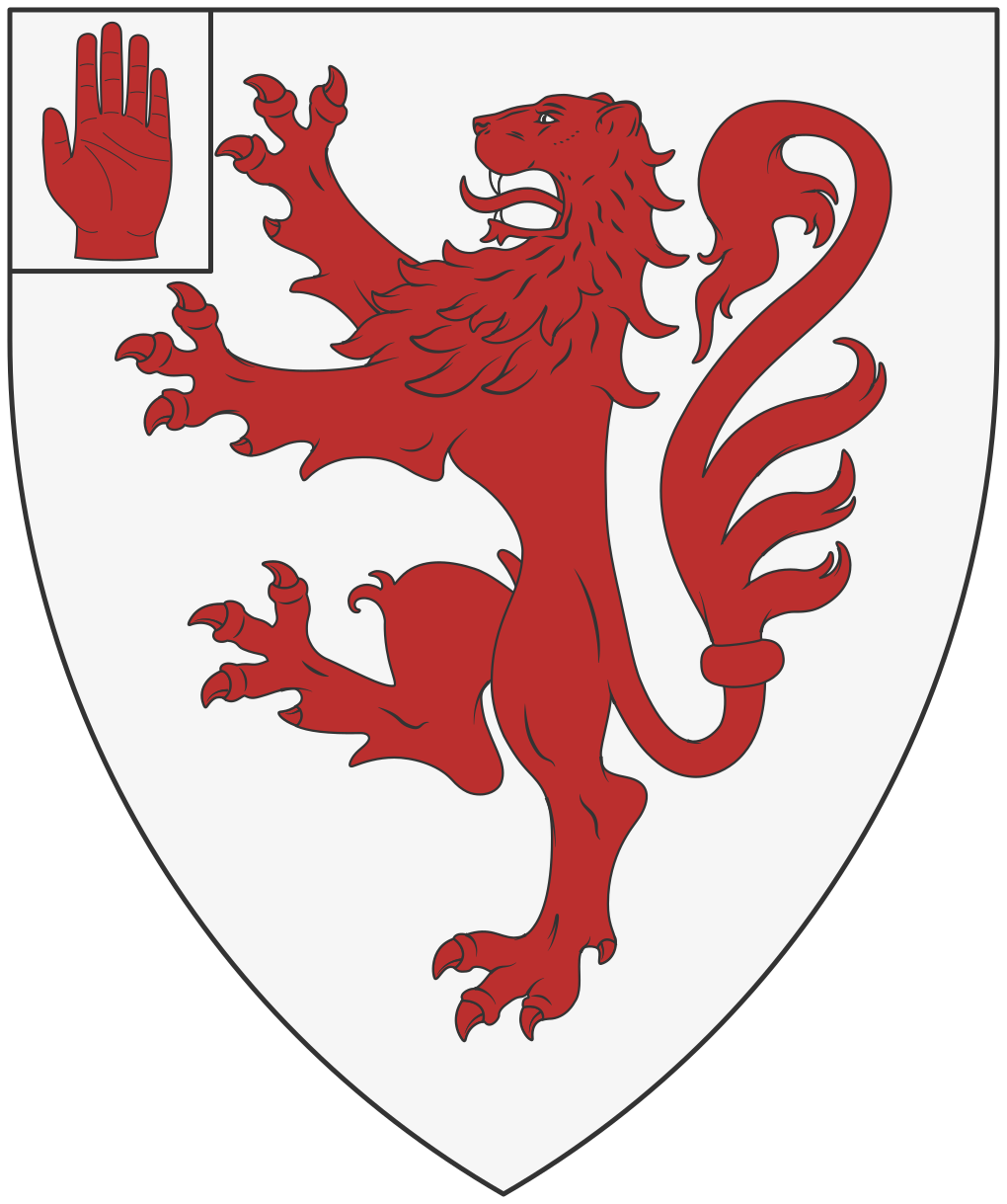
The coat of arms of Jermy of Bayfield, Baronets.

The Jermy Baronetcy was a title in the Baronetage of England. It was created in November 1663 for Robert Jermy. However, nothing further is known of the title.

== 1663 ==
- Sir Robert Jermy, 1st Baronet (died after 1663)
