= Alfred, 5th Prince of Salm-Salm =

German nobleman (1838–1908)

Alfred Konstantin
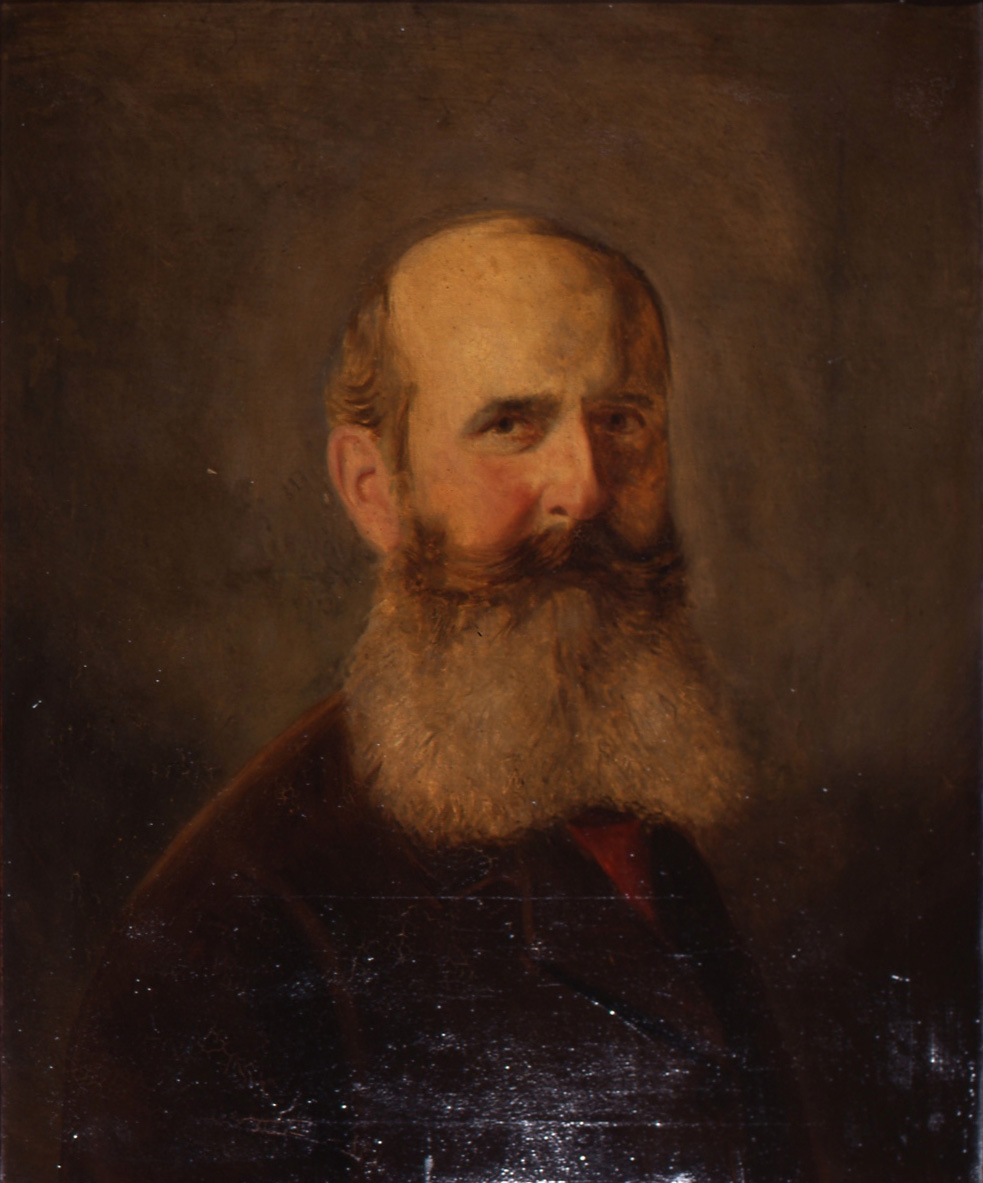

Prince of Salm-Salm
- Reign: 2 August 1846 – 5 October 1886
- Predecessor: Florentin
- Successor: Leopold
- Born: 27 December 1825; Anholt, Kingdom of Prussia
- Died: 5 October 1886 (aged 60); Anholt, Kingdom of Prussia, German Empire
- Spouse: Princess Auguste Adelheid of Croÿ (m. 1836; died 1886)
- Issue: Leopold, 6th Prince of Salm-Salm; Alfred, 7th Prince of Salm-Salm
Names
- Alfred Konstantin Alexander Angelus Maria Konstantin Alexander Angelus Maria zu Salm-Salm
- House: Salm-Salm
- Father: Florentin, 4th Prince of Salm-Salm
- Mother: Flaminia di Rossi

Alfred Konstantin Alexander Angelus Maria Konstantin Alexander Angelus Maria Fürst zu Salm-Salm (27 December 1814 – 5 October 1886) was a Prussian nobleman.

== Early life ==
Alfred Konstantin zu Salm-Salm was born on 27 December 1814 at Anholt Castle. He was the eldest son of Florentin, 4th Prince of Salm-Salm (1786–1846) and Flaminia di Rossi (1795–1840). His younger brothers were Prince Emil of Salm-Salm, who married Agnes von Ising, and Prince Felix of Salm-Salm, who morganatically married an American woman named Agnes Leclerc Joy in 1862, was killed in action during the Franco-Prussian War.

His paternal grandparents were Princess Viktoria Felizitas of Löwenstein-Wertheim-Rochefort (sister of Dominic Constantine, Prince of Löwenstein-Wertheim-Rochefort) and Prince Konstantin Alexander zu Salm-Salm, (Note: Alfred's grandfather, Konstantin, 3rd Prince of Salm-Salm (1762–1828), was the son of Prince Maximilian Friedrich Ernst of Salm-Salm (1732–1773), himself a younger son of Nikolaus Leopold of Salm-Salm, Duke of Hoogstraten (who was created 1st Prince of Salm-Salm in 1739). Prince Maximilian Friedrich was also the younger brother of Ludwig, 2nd Prince of Salm-Salm).) who was Sovereign Prince of Salm-Salm from 1778 until the principality was mediatised in 1813. His maternal grandparents were Niccolò di' Rossi and Angela Maria Bacciochi (a daughter of Francesco Bacciochi). His uncle, Count Carlo di' Rossi, was married to the Opera singer Henriette Sontag.

== Career ==
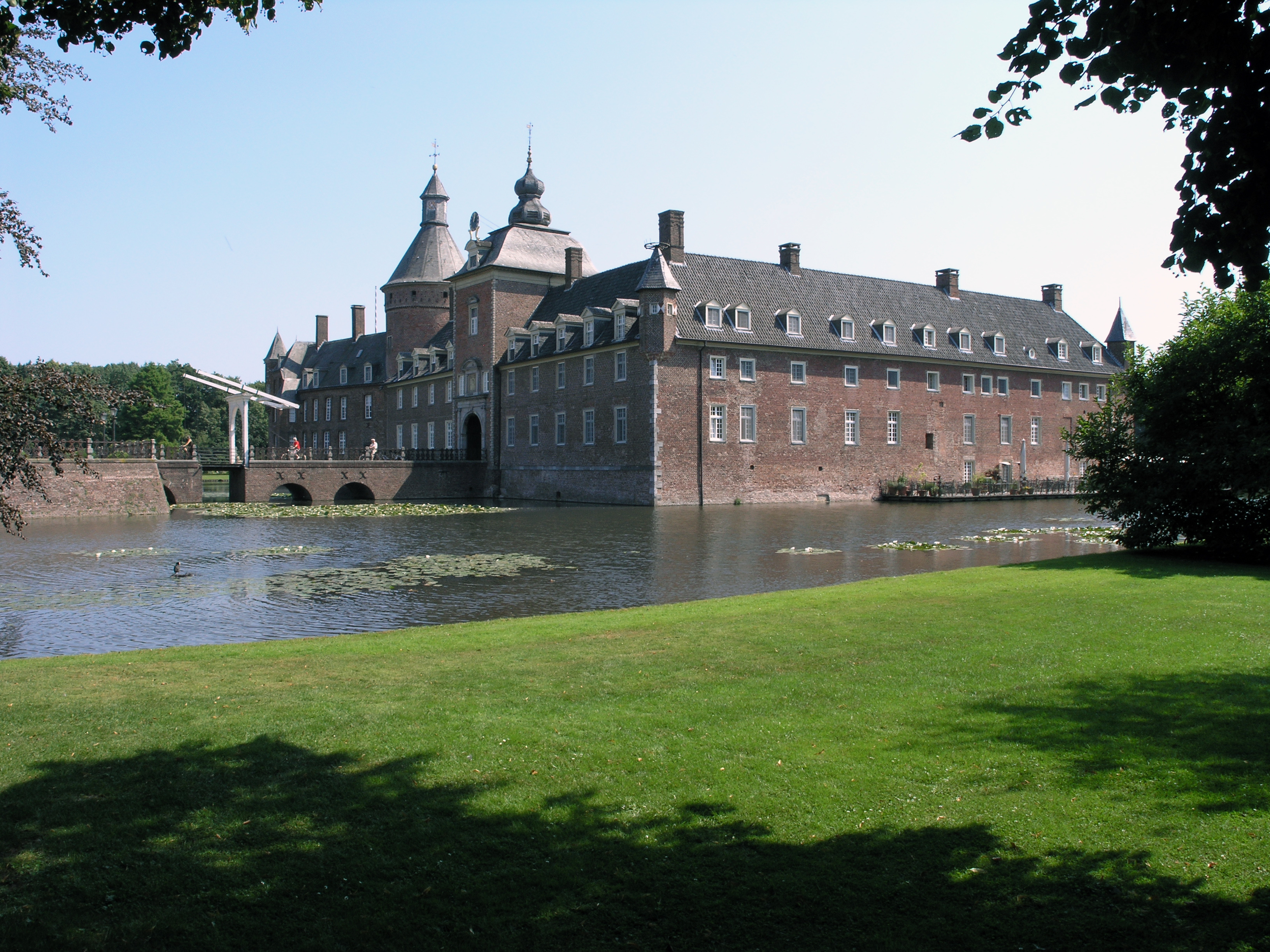
Anholt Castle

Upon the death of his father in 1846, he became the titular fifth Prince of Salm-Salm, which had been mediatised since 1813, and as Lord of Anholt. After he became Prince, he was a hereditary member of the Prussian House of Lords.

== Personal life ==
On 13 June 1836 married Princess Auguste Adelheid Emanuele Constanze of Croÿ (1815–1886), a daughter of Prince Ferdinand Victor Philippe of Croÿ (a son of Auguste, 9th Duke of Croÿ and grandson of Anne Emmanuel, 8th Duke of Croÿ) and Princess Constance Anne Louise de Croÿ-Solre (a daughter of Emmanuel Marie de Croÿ, Prince of Spire-le-Châus). Together, they were the parents of:

- Princess Mahilde of Salm-Salm (1837–1898)
- Nikolaus Leopold, 6th Prince of Salm-Salm (1838–1908), who married Princess Eleonore Leopoldine Aloysia von Croÿ, a daughter of Prince Alexis of Croÿ and Princess Franziska of Salm-Salm, in 1893.
- Princess Franziska of Salm-Salm (1840–1916), who married Prince August-Philipp of Croÿ, a son of Prince Philipp Franz of Croÿ-Dülmen and Princess Johanna Wilhelmina of Salm-Salm.
- Princess Maria of Salm-Salm (1843–1908)
- Prince Karl of Salm-Salm (1845–1923)
- Alfred Ferdinand, 7th Prince of Salm-Salm (1846–1923), who married Countess Rosa von Lützow, sister of Counts Francis and Heinrich von Lützow.
- Prince Emanuel of Salm-Salm (1847–1866)
- Prince Wilhelm of Salm-Salm (1848–1894)
- Prince Maximilian of Salm-Salm (1849–1873)
- Princess Euphemia of Salm-Salm (1851–1931)
- Princess Flaminia of Salm-Salm (1853–1913), who married Count Ferdinand Wolff-Metternich zur Gracht, brother of Count Paul Wolff-Metternich zur Gracht.

Prince Alfred died at Arnhold on 8 October 1886. Upon his death, he was succeeded by his eldest son, Leopold. When he died childless in 1908, the title passed to his younger brother, Alfred.

== Notes ==
Alfred, 5th Prince of Salm-Salm House of Salm Cadet branch of the House of Salm Born: 27 December 1814 Died: 5 October 1886
German nobility
Preceded by Florentin	Prince of Salm-Salm; 2 August 1846 – 5 October 1886	Succeeded by Leopold
