= Alfred zu Salm-Salm =

German nobleman (1838–1908)

Alfred
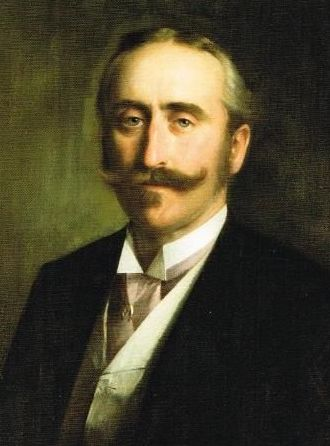

Prince of Salm-Salm
- Reign: 16 February 1908 – 20 April 1923
- Predecessor: Leopold
- Successor: Nikolaus Leopold
- Born: 13 March 1846; Anholt, Kingdom of Prussia
- Died: 20 April 1923 (aged 77); Anholt, Weimar Republic
- Spouse: Countess Rosa von Lützow (m. 1869; died 1923)
- Issue: Emanuel, Hereditary Prince of Salm-Salm
Names
- Alfred Ferdinand Stephan Maria zu Salm-Salm
- House: Salm-Salm
- Father: Alfred, 5th Prince of Salm-Salm
- Mother: Princess Auguste Adelheid of Croÿ

Alfred Ferdinand Stephan Maria Fürst zu Salm-Salm (13 March 1846 – 20 April 1923) was a German nobleman in the Kingdom of Prussia and a member of the Prussian House of Lords.

== Early life ==
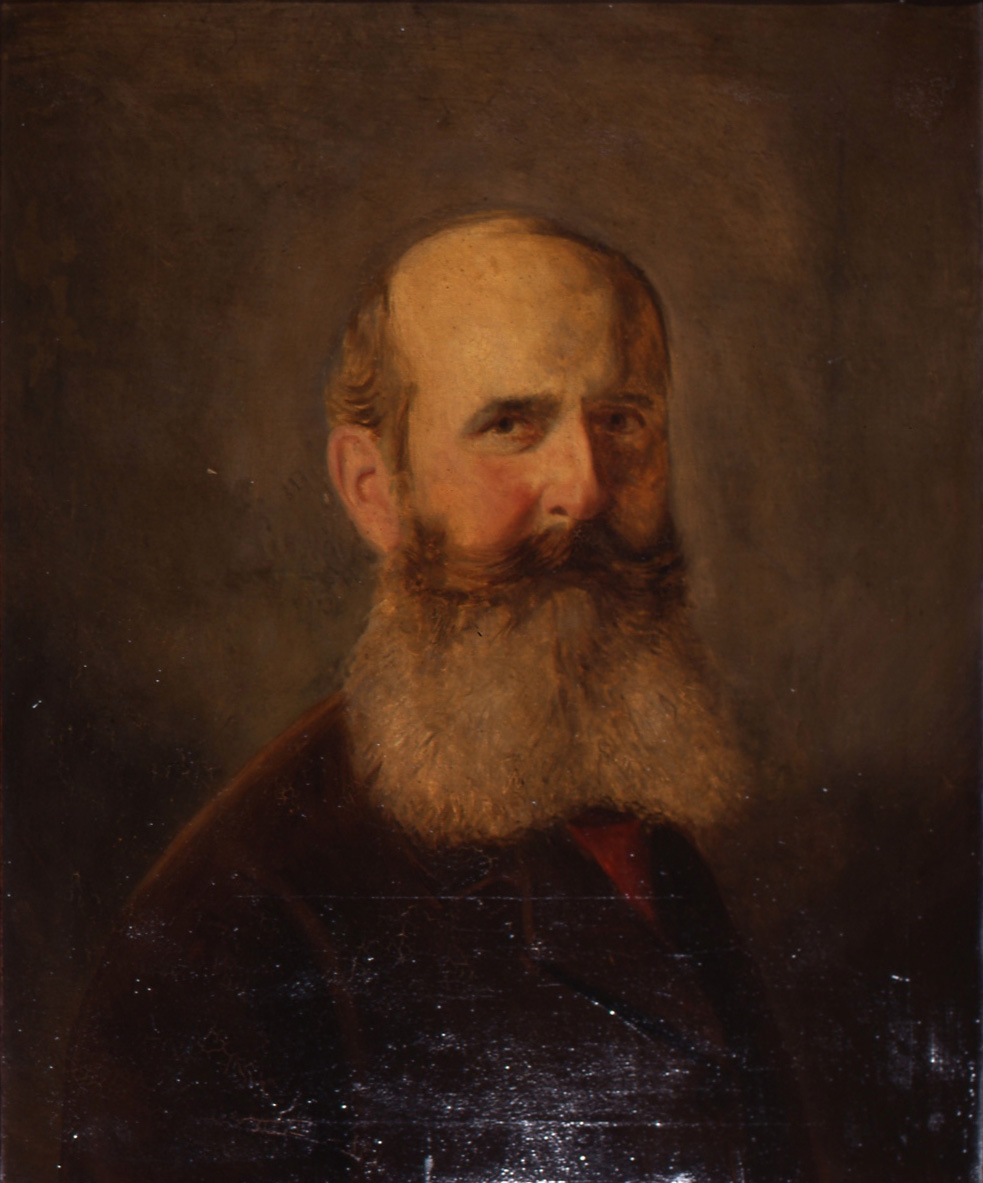
Portrait of his father, Prince Alfred Konstantin

Alfred zu Salm-Salm was born on 13 March 1846 at Anholt Castle. He was sixth of eleven children of Alfred Konstantin, 5th Prince of Salm-Salm and Princess Auguste Adelheid Emanuele Constanze von Croÿ (1815–1886). Among his siblings was elder brother, Prince Leopold zu Salm-Salm, who married Princess Eleonore of Croÿ.

His paternal grandparents were Florentin, 4th Prince of Salm-Salm and Flaminia di Rossi (a daughter of Nicolo de Rossi). His paternal uncle was Prince Felix of Salm-Salm, who was killed in action during the Franco-Prussian War and had morganatically married an American woman named Agnes Leclerc Joy in 1862. His maternal grandparents were Prince Ferdinand Victor Philippe of Croÿ (a son of Auguste, 9th Duke of Croÿ and grandson of Anne Emmanuel, 8th Duke of Croÿ) and Princess Constance Anne Louise de Croÿ-Solre (a daughter of Emmanuel Marie de Croÿ, Prince of Spire-le-Châus).

== Career ==
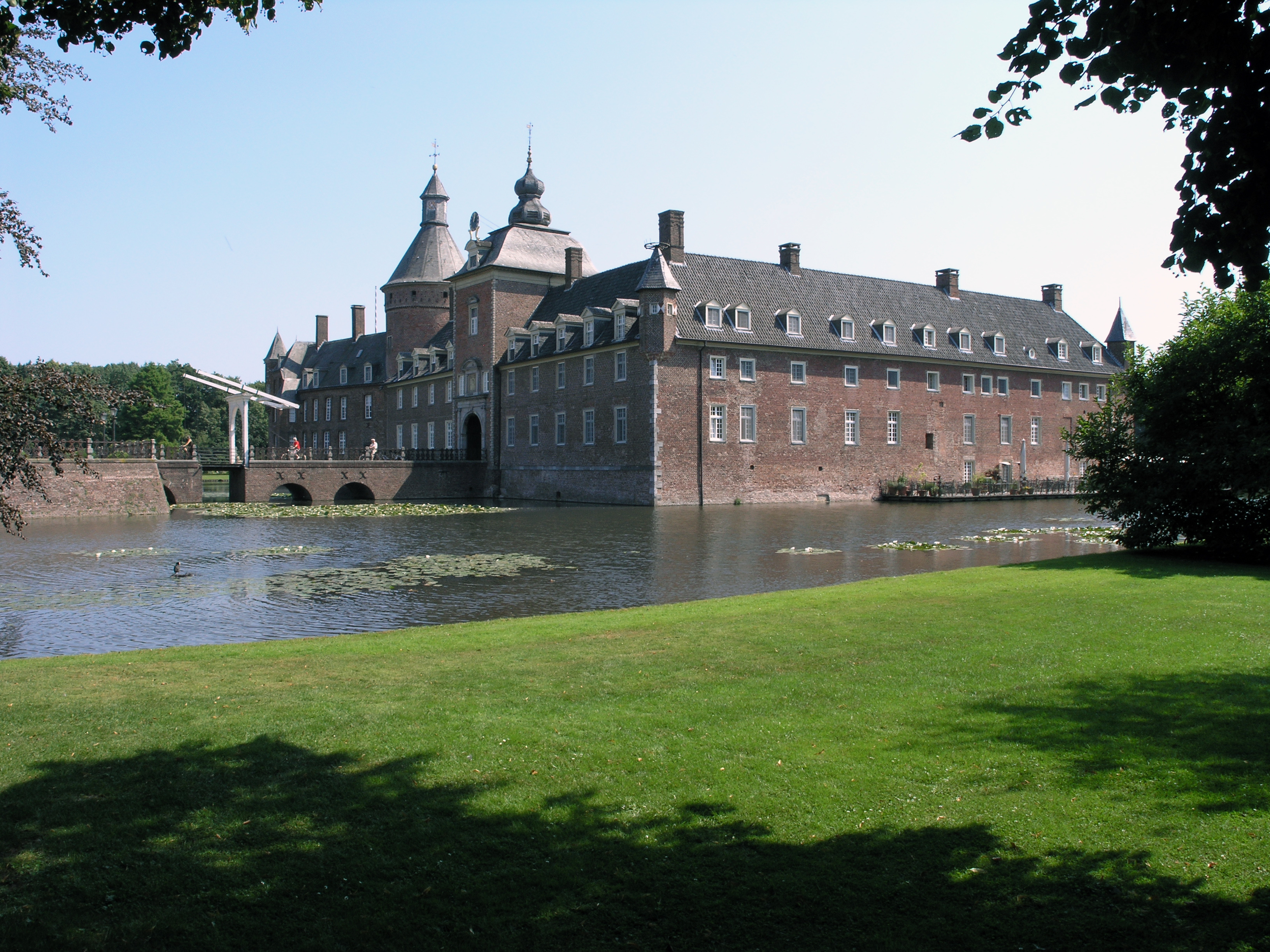
Anholt Castle

In 1863, at the age of 17, Alfred joined the 14th Imperial and Royal Dragoon Regiment. As a Lieutenant and First lieutenant, he fought in the German-Danish War in 1864 and in Bohemia in the Austro-Prussian War in 1866. He received numerous war decorations and rose to the military rank of Rittmeister. After leaving the army, he lived at Schloss Rhede in Rhede.

Upon the death of his elder brother, a widower who died without issue on 16 February 1908, he became the titular seventh Prince of Salm-Salm, which had been mediatised since 1813, and well as Lord of Anholt, becoming a hereditary member of the Prussian House of Lords (until its dissolution in 1918) and the Parliament of the Province of Westphalia.

=== Salm-Salm archives ===
Beginning in the early 1880s, Alfred devoted himself to the House of Salm-Salm's extensive archives. In May 1898, he became the first founder of the Historical Commission for Westphalia. From 1912 to 1913, he commissioned the construction of a new building for the Salm-Salm Archives. He also succeeded in transferring the archives of the Wildgraves, the Rhinegraves, the Counts, and the Princes of Salm-Horstmar and the Princes of Salm-Kyrburg to the joint archives of the Princes of Salm-Salm and Salm-Horstmar in Anholt.

== Personal life ==
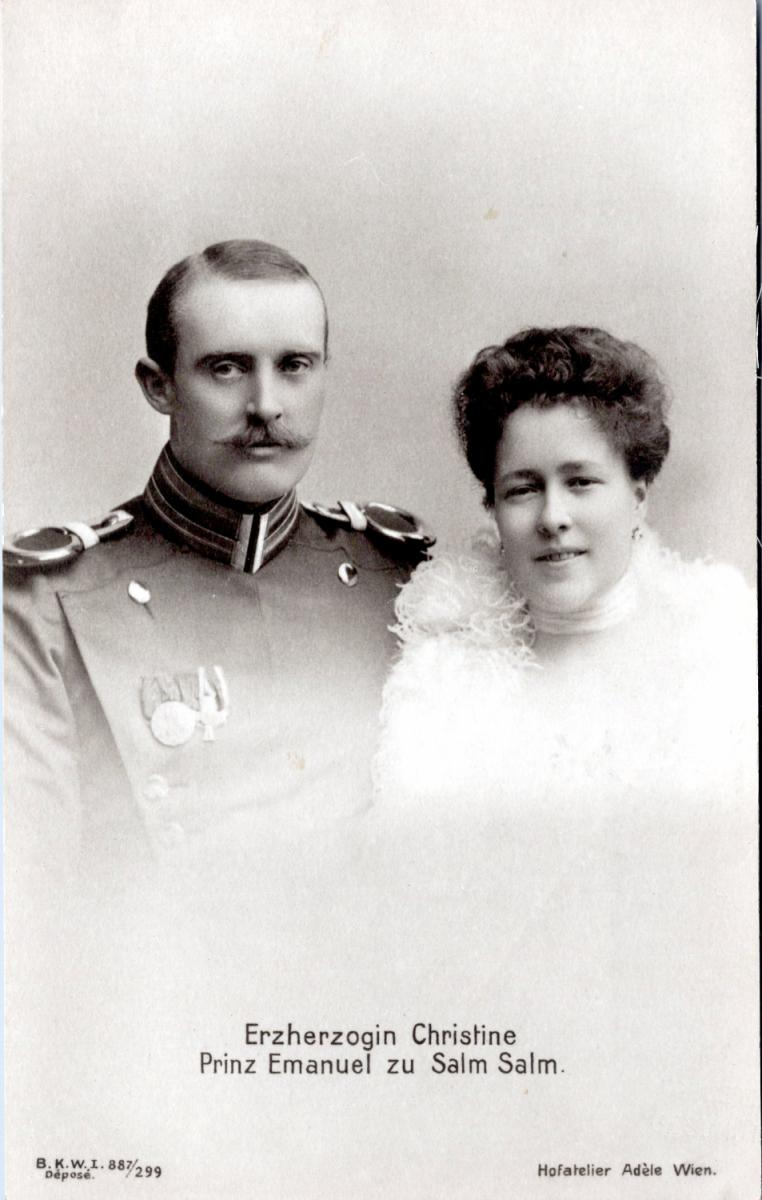
Photograph of his eldest son, Emanuel, and daughter-in-law, Archduchess Maria Christina of Austria, 1902

On 18 October 1869 in Vienna, Prince Alfred married Countess Rosa Margaretha Karolina Isabella von Lützow (1850–1927), a daughter of Franz von Lützow, Count of Tuppau and Sachsengrün and Henriette Seymour (a granddaughter of the 2nd Marquess of Hertford). Her brothers were the diplomats Count Francis von Lützow and Count Heinrich von Lützow. Together, they were the parents of three sons and five daughters, including:

- Emanuel Alfred Leopold Franz, Hereditary Prince of Salm-Salm (1871–1916), who was killed in battle at Pinsk; he married Archduchess Maria Christina of Austria, the eldest child of Archduke Friedrich, Duke of Teschen, and Princess Isabella of Croÿ. (Note: Archduchess Maria Christina of Austria (1879–1962) was granddaughter of Karl Ferdinand, Archduke of Austria and Archduchess Elisabeth Franziska of Austria (a daughter of Archduke Joseph, Palatine of Hungary) through her father, and Rudolf, 11th Duke of Croÿ, and Princess Natalie of Ligne (a daughter of Eugène, 8th Prince of Ligne) through her mother.)
- Princess Marie Emma Henriette Franziska of Salm-Salm (1874–1966), who died unmarried.
- Princess Henriette Franziska Alexia of Salm-Salm (1875–1961), who married Don Pietro Lucchesi-Palli, the son of Adinolfo Lucchesi-Palli, 10th Prince of Campofranco, (Note: Adinolfo Lucchesi-Palli, 10th Prince of Campofranco, was the son of Ettore Lucchesi-Palli, 4th Duke of Grazia and Princess Marie-Caroline of Bourbon-Two Sicilies (a daughter of King Francis I of the Two Sicilies and Archduchess Maria Clementina of Austria; Princess Marie-Caroline was previously married to Charles Ferdinand, Duke of Berry, the second son of King Charles X of France).) and Princess Lucrezia Nicoletta Sasso-Ruffo dei principi di Sant' Antimo.
- Prince Franz Emanuel Konstantin of Salm-Salm (1876–1964), who married Baroness Maria Anna von und zu Dalberg, a daughter of Baron Karl Heribert Kämmerer von Worms von und zu Dalberg and Countess Gabriele von Spiegel zum Desenberg-Hanxleden.
- Princess Rosa Mathilde Charlotte Leopoldine of Salm-Salm (1878–1963), who married Count Karl von Solms-Laubach, a son of Friedrich, 7th Count of Solms-Laubach and Countess Marianne von Stolberg-Wernigerode.
- Prince Alfred Florentin Konstantin of Salm-Salm (1879–1952)
- Princess Augusta Flaminia Ferdinanda of Salm-Salm (1881–1946), who married Count Felix Droste zu Vischering von Nesselrode-Reichenstein, a son of Count Hermann Droste zu Vischering von Nesselrode-Reichenstein and Baroness Elisabeth von Vietinghoff genannt Schell zu Schellenberg.
- Princess Eleonore Henriette Christi of Salm-Salm (1887–1978), who married Carl Rieniets.

Prince Alfred died at Anholt on 20 April 1923. As his eldest son predeceased him, he was succeeded by his grandson, Nikolaus Leopold, as the 8th Prince of Salm-Salm. His widow died on 5 February 1927 at Borohrádek (today a town in Rychnov nad Kněžnou District in the Hradec Králové Region of the Czech Republic).

=== Descendants ===
Through his eldest son Emanuel, he was a grandfather of Princess Isabelle of Salm-Salm (1903–2009), considered the longest lived royal European centenarian, (Note: Princess Isabelle of Salm-Salm married Count Felix von Loë and had issue.) Princess Rosemary of Salm-Salm (1904–2001), (Note: Princess Rosemary of Salm-Salm married Archduke Hubert Salvator of Austria, the second son of Archduke Franz Salvator of Austria, and Archduchess Marie Valerie of Austria.) and, his heir, Nikolaus Leopold, 8th Prince of Salm-Salm (1906–1988).

== Ancestry ==
Ancestors of Alfred zu Salm-Salm

8. Konstantin, 3rd Prince of Salm-Salm
4. Florentin, 4th Prince of Salm-Salm
9. Princess Viktoria Felizitas zu Löwenstein-Wertheim-Rochefort
2. Alfred Konstantin, 5th Prince of Salm-Salm
10. Niccolo Rossi
5. Flaminia Rossi
11. Angela Maria Baciocchi
1. Alfred, 7th Prince of Salm-Salm
12. Auguste, 9th Duke of Croÿ
6. Prince Ferdinand von Croÿ-Solre
13. Anne-Victurnienne-Henriette de Rochechouart de Mortemart
3. Princess Auguste von Croÿ-Solre
14. Prince Emmanuel de Croÿ-Solre
7. Princess Constance Anne Louise de Croÿ-Solre
15. Adelaide de Croÿ-Havre

== Notes ==
Alfred, 7th Prince of Salm-Salm House of Salm Cadet branch of the House of Salm Born: 13 March 1846 Died: 20 April 1923
German nobility
Preceded by Leopold	Prince of Salm-Salm; 16 February 1908 – 11 August 1919	Succeeded by German nobility titles abolished
Titles in pretence
Loss of title	— TITULAR — Prince of Salm-Salm; 11 August 1919 – 20 April 1923	Succeeded by Nikolaus Leopold
