= Leopold zu Salm-Salm =

German nobleman (1838–1908)

Leopold
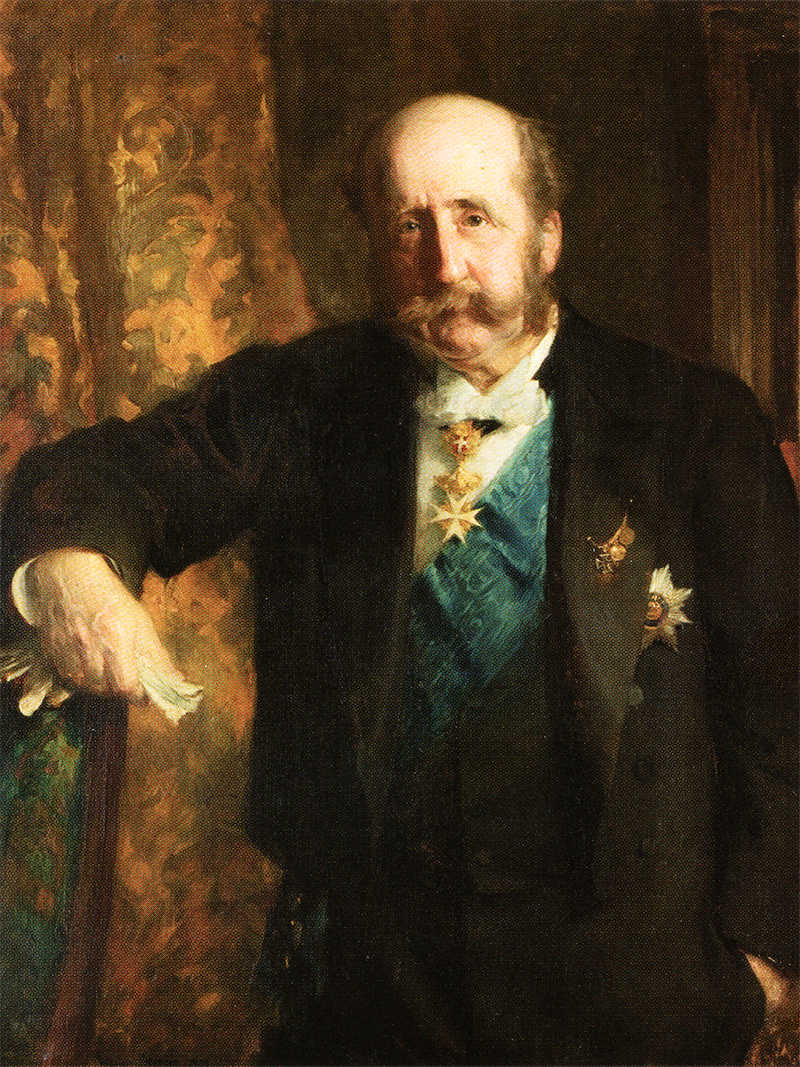
- Portrait of Prince Leopold by Walter Petersen, 1906

Prince of Salm-Salm
- Reign: 5 October 1886 – 16 February 1908
- Predecessor: Alfred Konstantin
- Successor: Alfred
- Born: 18 July 1838; Anholt, Kingdom of Prussia
- Died: 16 February 1908 (aged 69); Anholt, Kingdom of Prussia, German Empire
- Spouse: Princess Eleonore of Croÿ (m. 1893; died 1903)
Names
- Nikolaus Leopold Joseph Maria zu Salm-Salm
- House: Salm-Salm
- Father: Alfred, 5th Prince of Salm-Salm
- Mother: Princess Auguste Adelheid of Croÿ

Nikolaus Leopold Joseph Maria Fürst zu Salm-Salm (18 July 1838 – 16 February 1908) was a German nobleman with an interest in natural history. He built a park at his castle in Anholt, with a miniature Lake Lucerne. He controlled coal mining rights in the region.

== Early life ==
Leopold zu Salm-Salm was born on 18 July 1838 at Anholt. He was the eldest son of Alfred Konstantin, 5th Prince of Salm-Salm and Princess Auguste Adelheid Emanuele Constanze von Croÿ (1815–1886). His younger brother, Alfred, married Countess Rosa von Lützow (sister of Counts Francis and Heinrich von Lützow).

His paternal grandparents were Florentin, 4th Prince of Salm-Salm and Flaminia di Rossi (a daughter of Nicolo de Rossi). His paternal uncle was Prince Felix of Salm-Salm, who was killed in action during the Franco-Prussian War and had morganatically married an American woman named Agnes Leclerc Joy in 1862. His maternal grandparents were Prince Ferdinand Victor Philippe of Croÿ (a son of Auguste, 9th Duke of Croÿ and grandson of Anne Emmanuel, 8th Duke of Croÿ) and Princess Constance Anne Louise de Croÿ-Solre (a daughter of Emmanuel Marie de Croÿ, Prince of Spire-le-Châus).

He was privately educated.

== Career ==
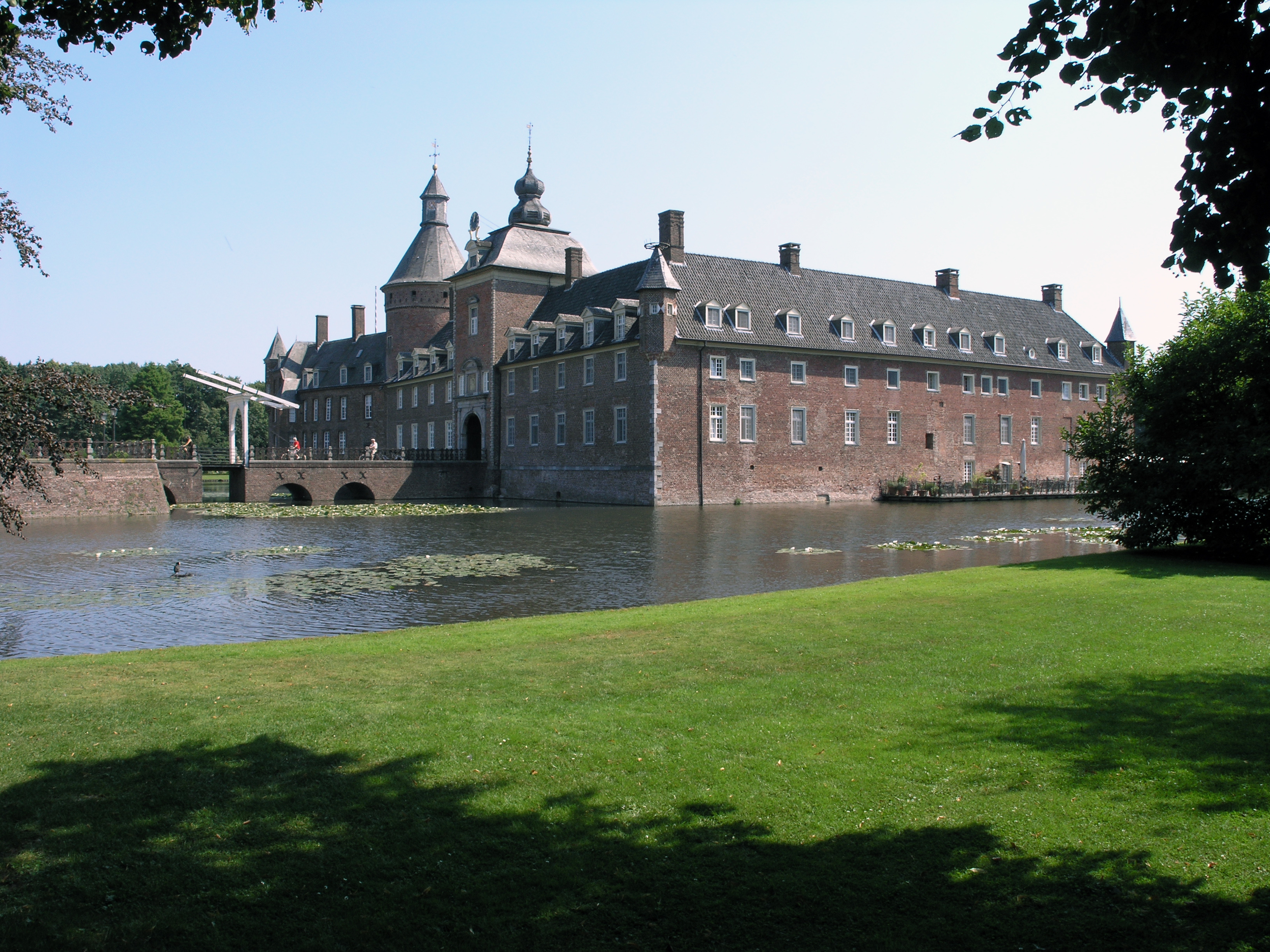
Anholt Castle

The Prince had an interest in natural history and began to observe birds in the region and also made a collection of specimens. He also took an interest in crustaceans. He also took an interest in horses and was involved in their breeding.

He was the titular sixth Prince of Salm-Salm from 1886 to 1908, which had been mediatised since 1813, and as Lord of Anholt he was a hereditary member of the Prussian House of Lords from 1888 until his death in 1908. Owning the rights to all mineral resources in the Principality of Salm, he began to mine coal. The Trier mining company continued after his death and several of the shafts were named after Leopold.

== Personal life ==
In 1893, he married Princess Eleonore Leopoldine Aloysia von Croÿ (1855–1903), daughter of Prince Alexis Wilhelm Zephyrinus Victor von Croÿ (1825–1898) and Princess Franziska Maria Johanna Carolina Aloysia zu Salm-Salm (1833–1908). The spent their honeymoon in Switzerland and on returning he began to construct a Swiss style chalet at Anholt Castle and the grounds included a miniature Lake Lucerne.

Princess Eleonore died in Berlin on 27 May 1903. Prince Leopold, who died childless at Anholt, was succeeded by his younger brother, Alfred. Leopold zu Salm-Salm's large collection of crustaceans and bird specimens went to the Westphalian Provincial Museum for Natural History in Münster.

== Ancestry ==
Ancestors of Leopold zu Salm-Salm

8. Konstantin, 3rd Prince of Salm-Salm
4. Florentin, 4th Prince of Salm-Salm
9. Princess Viktoria Felizitas zu Löwenstein-Wertheim-Rochefort
2. Alfred Konstantin, 5th Prince of Salm-Salm
10. Niccolo Rossi
5. Flaminia Rossi
11. Angela Maria Baciocchi
1. Leopold, 6th Prince of Salm-Salm
12. Auguste, 9th Duke of Croÿ
6. Prince Ferdinand von Croÿ-Solre
13. Anne-Victurnienne-Henriette de Rochechouart de Mortemart
3. Princess Auguste von Croÿ-Solre
14. Prince Emmanuel de Croÿ-Solre
7. Princess Constance Anne Louise de Croÿ-Solre
15. Adelaide de Croÿ-Havre

Leopold, 6th Prince of Salm-Salm House of Salm Cadet branch of the House of Salm Born: 18 July 1838 Died: 16 February 1908
German nobility
Preceded by Alfred Konstantin	Prince of Salm-Salm; 5 October 1886 – 16 February 1908	Succeeded by Alfred
