= Florentin, 4th Prince of Salm-Salm =

German nobleman (1786–1846)

Florentin
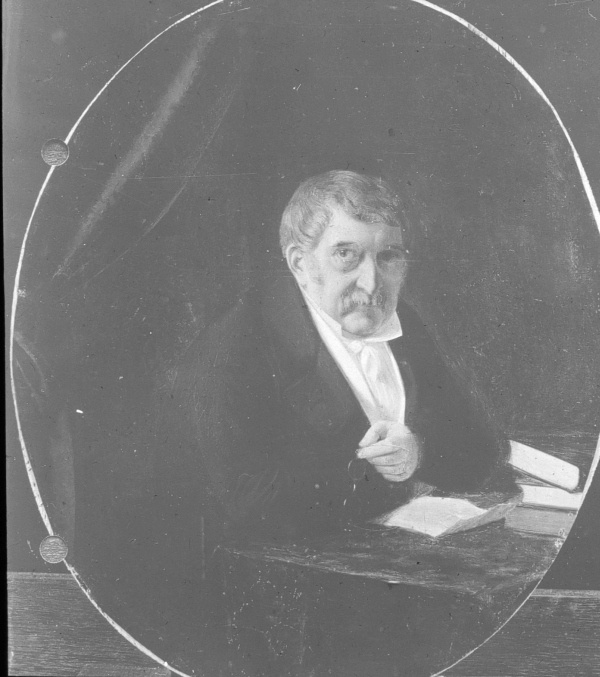

Prince of Salm-Salm
- Reign: 25 February 1828 – 2 August 1846
- Predecessor: Konstantin Alexander
- Successor: Alfred Konstantin
- Born: 17 March 1786; Senones, Vosges
- Died: 2 August 1846 (aged 60); Anholt, Kingdom of Prussia
- Spouse: Flaminia di Rossi (m. 1810; died 1840)
- Issue: Alfred, 5th Prince of Salm-Salm; Prince Emil of Salm-Salm; Prince Felix of Salm-Salm
Names
- Wilhelm Florentin Ludwig Karl zu Salm-Salm
- House: Salm-Salm
- Father: Konstantin, 3rd Prince of Salm-Salm

Wilhelm Florentin Ludwig Karl Fürst zu Salm-Salm (17 March 1786 – 2 August 1846) was a Prussian nobleman and general.

== Early life ==
Florentin zu Salm-Salm was born on 17 March 1786 at Senones, Vosges, which was the capital of the Principality of Salm-Salm until 1793. He was the only surviving child of Konstantin Alexander, 3rd Prince of Salm-Salm (1762–1828) and, his first wife, Princess Viktoria Felizitas of Löwenstein-Wertheim-Rochefort (1769–1786). His father was the sovereign Prince of Salm-Salm from 1778 until the principality was mediatised in 1813. After his mother's death a few month's after his birth, his father remarried to Countess Maria Walpurga von Sternberg-Manderscheid in 1788. She died in 1806 and his father married, thirdly, to Catharina Bender in 1810. Florentin had half-siblings from both of his father's later marriages.

His paternal grandparents were Prince Maximilian Friedrich of Salm-Salm (a younger son of Nikolaus Leopold of Salm-Salm, Duke of Hoogstraten, who was created 1st Prince of Salm-Salm in 1739). His grand-uncle was Ludwig, 2nd Prince of Salm-Salm. His maternal grandparents were Prince Theodor Alexander of Löwenstein-Wertheim-Rochefort (the youngest son of Dominic Marquard, 3rd Prince of Löwenstein-Wertheim-Rochefort) and Countess Luise of Leiningen-Dachsburg-Hartenburg. His maternal uncle was Dominic Constantine, Prince of Löwenstein-Wertheim-Rochefort.

== Career ==
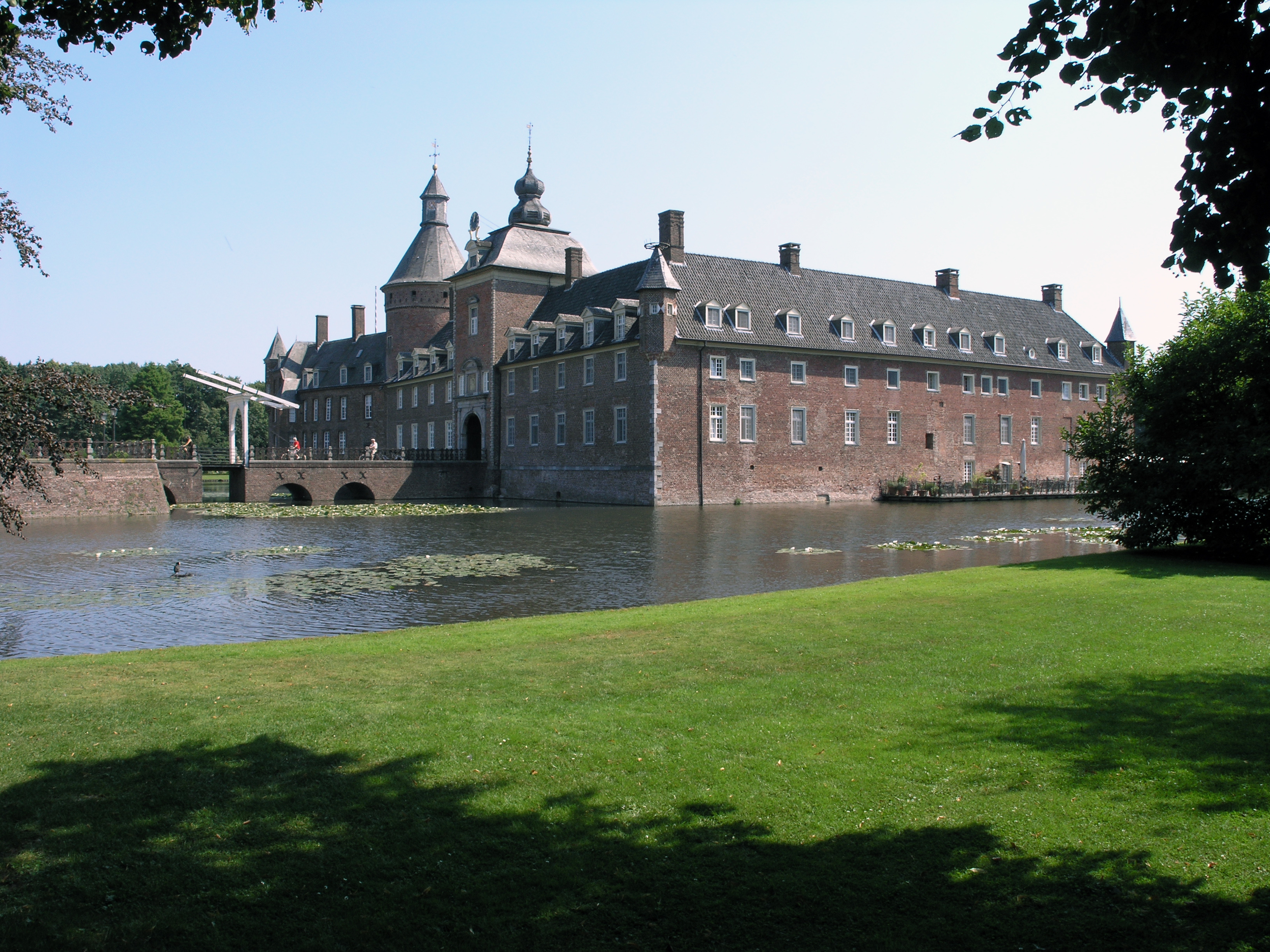
Anholt Castle

At the time of his 1810 marriage, he was an aide-de-camp to King Jérôme Bonaparte of Westphalia, serving as a colonel and adjutant. In this capacity, Florentin was also involved in the suppression of unrest in the neighboring Grand Duchy of Berg. In 1810, the Principality of Salm-Salm was annexed by the French Empire, which meant that Florentin lost the prospect of inheriting the rule as a sovereign. Hopes for the restoration of the principality, which had arisen during the German campaign of 1813, soon died out. The outcome of the Congress of Vienna in 1815 left him only with the possibility of becoming a Lord of the Manor in the Kingdom of Prussia through inheritance. Upon the death of his father in 1828, he became the titular fourth Prince of Salm-Salm, which had been mediatised since 1813, and as Lord of Anholt. After he became Prince, he was a hereditary member of the Prussian House of Lords.

After the French occupation, he was briefly commander-in-chief of Landwehr units in the Arrondissement of Rees. He then entered Dutch service, where he served as Colonel of the Queen's Regiment and later retired with the rank of Major General. Florentin was awarded the Order of the Crown of Westphalia and the Order of Saint Hubert.

In 1830, Florentin, who also bore the title of Duke of Hoogstraten, was among the candidates for the Belgian kingship, but it did not come to fruition either. (Note: When Belgium gained independence from the United Kingdom of the Netherlands in 1830, the National Congress nominated Louis, Duke of Nemours (the son of the French king Louis-Philippe), but Louis-Philippe was deterred from accepting the honour for his son. Afterwards, the National Congress appointed Erasme-Louis, Baron Surlet de Chokier to be the Regent of Belgium until Leopold of Saxe-Coburg-Saalfeld (the youngest son of Francis, Duke of Saxe-Coburg-Saalfeld) was designated as King of the Belgians.)

== Personal life ==
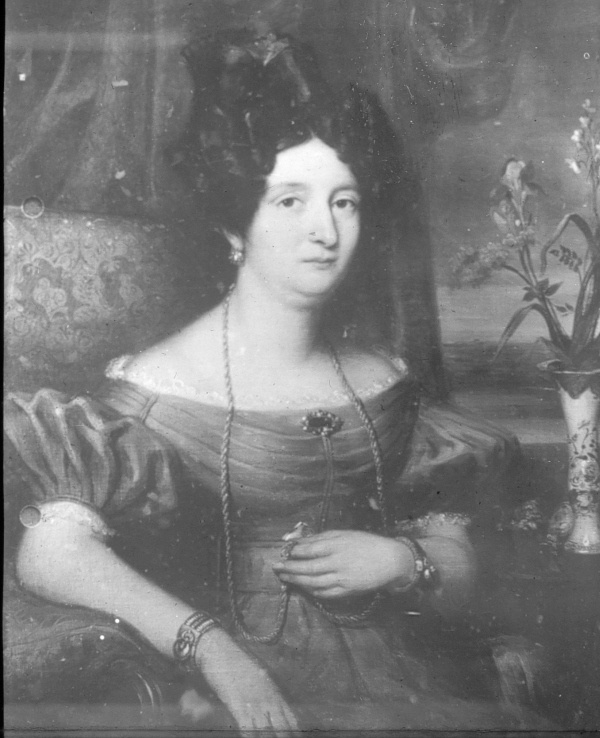
Flaminia di Rossi

On 21 July 1810 at Napoleonshöhe Palace near Kassel, Florentin was married to Magdalena Flaminia di Rossi (1795–1840), a daughter of Niccolò di' Rossi and Angela Maria Bacciochi (a daughter of Francesco Bacciochi, who came from lower Corsican nobility). King Jérôme Bonaparte welcomed the marriage and lavishly endowed the bride with a fortune. Her maternal uncle, Felice Pasquale Baciocchi, had married Elisa Bonaparte (the sister of Napoleon I), and her brother, Count Carlo di' Rossi, was married to the Opera singer Henriette Sontag. Together, they were the parents of:

- Alfred Konstantin Alexander, 5th Prince of Salm-Salm (1814–1886), who married Princess Auguste Adelheid of Croÿ, a daughter of Prince Ferdinand Victor Philippe of Croÿ (a son of Auguste, 9th Duke of Croÿ and grandson of Anne Emmanuel, 8th Duke of Croÿ) and Princess Constance Anne Louise de Croÿ-Solre (a daughter of Emmanuel Marie de Croÿ, Prince of Spire-le-Châus), 1836.
- Prince Emil Georg Maximilian Joseph of Salm-Salm (1820–1858), who married Agnes Wilhelmine Elisabeth Friederike von Ising, in 1851.
- Prince Felix Konstantin Alexander Johann Nepomuk of Salm-Salm (1828–1870), who morganatically married Agnes Leclerc Joy, a daughter of American Gen. William Leclerc Joy and Julia Willard, in 1862; he was killed in action during the Franco-Prussian War.

Flaminia died in 1840, at the age of 45, and was buried in the princely crypt chapel at Anholt. The Prince of Salm-Salm died on 2 August 1846 at his castle in Anholt. He was succeeded by his eldest son, Alfred.

=== Descendants ===
Through his eldest son Alfred, he was a grandfather of Leopold, 6th Prince of Salm-Salm (1838–1908), who married Princess Eleonore of Croÿ (a daughter of Prince Alexis of Croÿ); Princess Franziska of Salm-Salm (1840–1916), who married Prince August-Philipp of Croÿ (a son of Prince Philipp Franz of Croÿ-Dülmen); Alfred, 7th Prince of Salm-Salm (1846–1923), who married Countess Rosa von Lützow (sister of Counts Francis and Heinrich von Lützow); and Princess Flaminia of Salm-Salm (1853–1913), who married Count Ferdinand Wolff-Metternich zur Gracht (brother of Count Paul Wolff-Metternich zur Gracht).

== Notes ==
Florentin, 4th Prince of Salm-Salm House of Salm Cadet branch of the House of Salm Born: 17 March 1786 Died: 2 August 1846
German nobility
Preceded by Konstantin	Prince of Salm-Salm; 25 February 1828 – 2 August 1846	Succeeded by Alfred Konstantin
