= Diana Bathing with her Nymphs with Actaeon and Callisto =

Painting by Rembrandt van Rijn

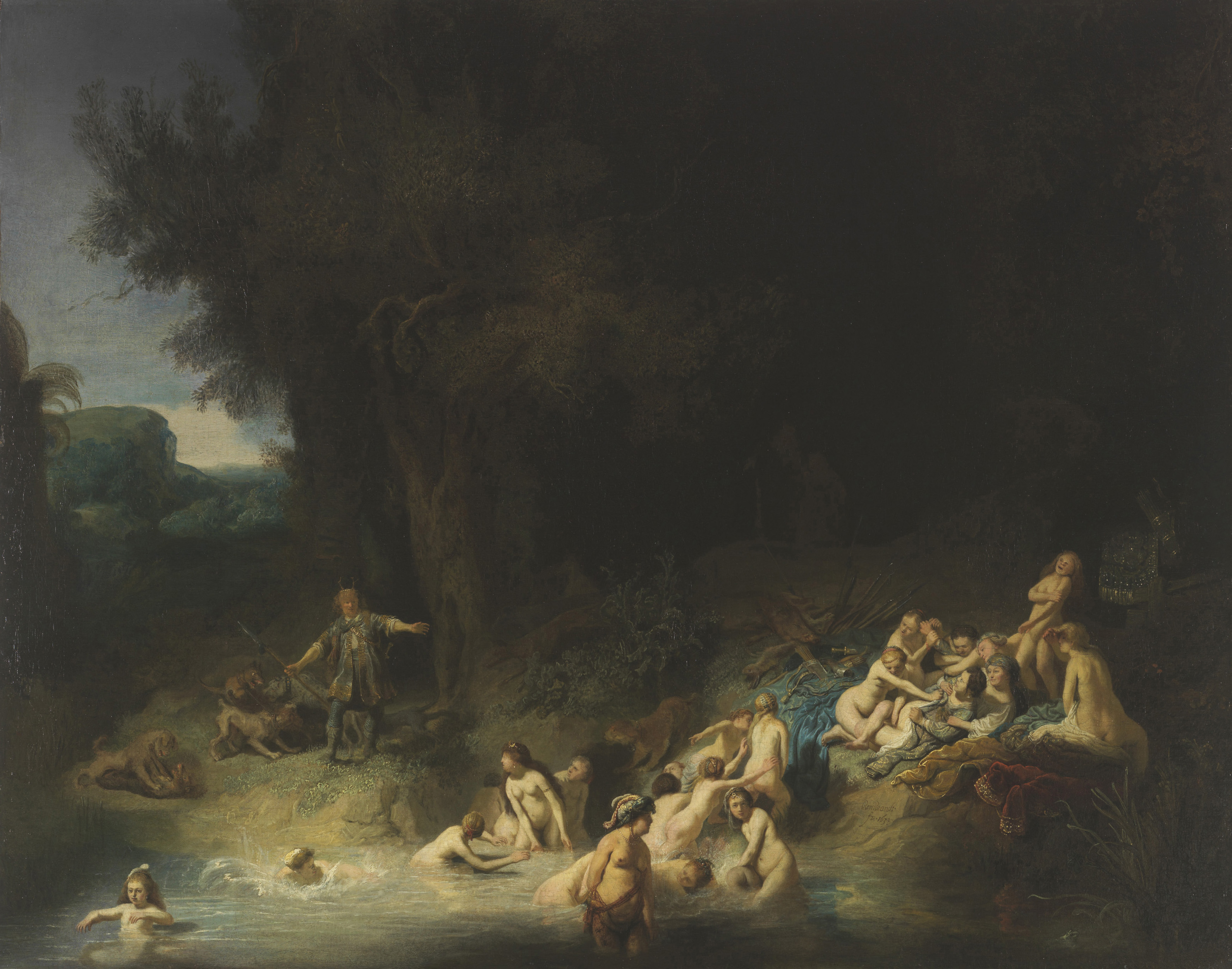
- Artist: Rembrandt van Rijn
- Year: 1634
- Medium: Oil on canvas
- Dimensions: 168 cm × 93.5 cm (66 in × 36.8 in)
- Location: Wasserburg Anholt; Anholt, Germany

Diana Bathing with her Nymphs with Actaeon and Callisto is a 1634 painting by the Dutch painter Rembrandt van Rijn. It is now in the Salm-Salm princely collection in the Wasserburg Anholt in Anholt, Germany.

It shows two episodes from Ovid's Metamorphoses, in both of which someone is punished by the goddess Diana for a sexual offence. On the left, Actaeon is punished for seeing the goddess naked by being turned into a stag and killed by his own hounds. On the right, Diana's other nymphs are tearing off Callisto's clothing to reveal how she has broken her vow of chastity and is now carrying Jupiter's child. For this, Diana expels her from her court and she later gives birth to Arcas before being turned into a bear by Juno, whom Arcas almost kills whilst hunting.

Unusually, the painting also includes an image of an elderly couple unrelated to either of the two stories (background) and a middle-aged nymph (in the foreground).

== See also ==
- List of paintings by Rembrandt

== Bibliography ==
- W. Busch: Das keusche und das unkeusche Sehen, Rembrandts „Diana, Aktäon und Kallisto“, in: Zeitschrift für Kunstgeschichte, Bd. 52, München 1989, S. 257–277.
- S. Grohé: Rembrandts mythologische Historien, Köln 1996, S. 195–223. (ISBN 3412099945)
- C. Janicek: Rembrandts "Bad der Diana mit Aktäon und Kallisto", Diplomarbeit, Universität Wien, 2004.
- E. J. Sluijter: De 'Heydensche Fabulen' in de Noordnederlandse Schilderkunst circa 1590-1670. Een proeve van beschrijving en interpretatie van schilderijen met verhalende onderwerpen uit de klassieke mythologie, Dissertation, Leiden 1986.
- A. W. Vliegenthart, Einige Bemerkungen zu Rembrandts Aktäon und Kallisto, in: Nederlands Kunsthistorisch Jaarboek, 23, 1972, S. 85–94.
