= Château de Salm =

Ruined castle in Bas-Rhin, Alsace, France

Coordinates: 48°27′11″N 7°8′24″E

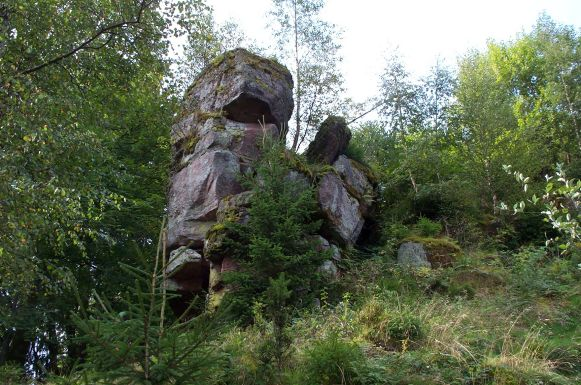

Château de Salm is a ruined castle overlooking the valley of the Bruche, located in the commune of La Broque in the present-day département of Bas-Rhin, Alsace, France. Construction began in 1205 and was completed around 1400.

It has been listed since 6 December 1898 as a monument historique by the French Ministry of Culture.

== History ==
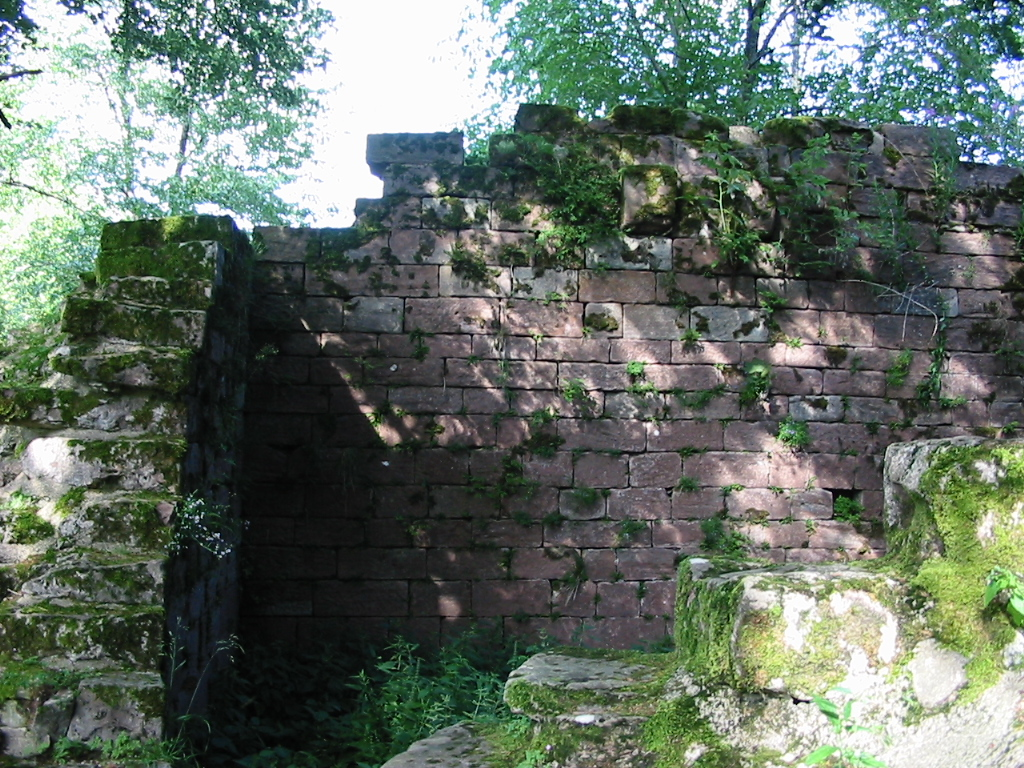
Detail of the ruins

The Château de Salm was built between 1205 and 1225 by Henry III, Count of Salm (of Haute Lorraine), on the territory of the Senones Abbey of which he was the lawyer. The Salm dynasty originated in the 13th century with the Counts of Bar (Bar-le-Duc), one of the more powerful families of Lorraine. The Salm-Lorraine dynasty came from the Luxembourg family.

Henry IV, grandson of the builder, reorganized the saltpans of Morhange as well as the Framont forges which were situated close by. Industrial politics provoked a military reaction around 1259 from the Bishop of Metz, who occupied the installations and forced the count to sell him the castle at Salm and the Château de Pierre-Percée and to swear fealty to him. When the bishop left the castles, the count retook the fortresses.

In 1285, the trouvère from Lorraine, Jacques Bretel, spent several days at the castle where he met Count Henry IV. He recounted his stay in his work le Tournoi de Chauvency.

The area was the site of an important occupation throughout the 14th and 15th centuries (with foundry, metallurgy and pottery activities), without a doubt the after-effects of the acquisition by Jean de Salm of the lower valley of Bruche in 1366, from Mutzig to Schirmeck. The large works completed around 1400 considerably altered the castle's defences with the construction of a thick shielding tower, a barbican and a new gate. The old shield wall was torn down and adapted for new functional requirements.

The castle seems, however, to have been ruined around 1500 because it is recorded as a ruin in 1564, though no documentary record of violent destruction is known. Prince Constantin Alexander of Salm-Salm visited the castle in 1779 in the company of the prince of Hohenlohe-Schillingsfürst, to see an inscription on the bas-relief of an outside wall.

The ruins served as a quarry soon after the annexation of the Principality of Salm-Salm by the French Republic in 1793. It was bombarded by French artillery during the First World War in 1914 because a German observation post had been established there.

Integrated into German territory by the Treaty of Frankfort in 1871, the vestiges of it were classified as a historic monument by the Imperial Administration of Alsace-Lorraine on 6 December. In 1919, the territory was attached to the French département of Bas-Rhin.

== Description ==
Constructed at 809 metres above sea level on a rocky hill of red sandstone with a northeast-southwest orientation, the castle extends on different levels over an area of approximately 120 metres by 50 metres. The primitive castle of the 13th century, or Kernburg, was equipped in the southwest with a shield wall facing possible attack, behind which were living quarters and the cistern. A palace, or Palas, which shows the remarkable architectural quality of elements which composed the decoration, is situated opposite the curtain walls in the northwest and northeast, which dominate the keep, or Bergfried (tower refuge), constructed on the rock's highest point (its northern extremity). In the course of the 14th century, the shield wall was reinforced by one or two flanking towers before a shield tower and a postern were constructed in the front, maybe around the beginning of the 15th century.

== Details of the ruins ==
Since 2004, conservation workers employed by the association of Veilleurs de Salm have been able to excavate lost walls and to progressively understand more of the different stages of construction.

The reading of the plans nevertheless remains very difficult, in comparing them to the few ruins which are left. Few significant traces remain of the shield tower, the vaulted ceilinged room that housed the cistern, which is rare in Alsace, and the postern. Analysis of the ruin's details shows the presence of large basses-cours built at the end of the fourteenth century, a barbican and more interior battlements with doors and window slits, but also the presence of cross-shaped windows for crossbowmen in the 13th century. The richness of the movable architecture (still under investigation) suggests the presence of a chapel, which was generally a standard fixture of a count's castle.

The shield tower, which is flush with the second floor, has a large artificial hole (damage?). It is named thus not only because it was intended to face siege cannons (the thickness of the wall reaching 3 metres), but also because it hid the castle behind it.

The princely visit of 1779 was preceded by important repair works which weighed heavily on the face of the ruins. Even today, the plan and chronology of the castle's construction is still open to interpretation, the assembly of data and analysis of gothic elements place this castle among the most beautiful counts' achievements of the 13th century in Alsace and Lorraine.

== See also ==
- List of castles in France

== Bibliography ==
(taken from the French page)

- Marc Brignon, "La fin du château de Salm", Revue Lorraine (56), 1984.
- Pierre de la Condamine, Salm en Vosges, nouvelle édition augmentée, Ed. du Palais Royal, Paris, 1974.
- Dominique Dantan, Les châteaux de Salm et Pierre-Percée, maîtrise d’histoire, Université de Nancy II, 1984.
- Danièle Erpelding, Actes des princes lorrains, 1^{re} série, Actes des comtes de Salm, Université de Nancy II, UER de Recherche Régionale, 1979.
- Denis Leypold, "Contribution à la connaissance du château de Salm, données historiques et architecturales", L'Essor (139), 1988.
- Denis Leypold, "Nouvelles données historiques sur la château de Salm : le point sur sa construction", L'Essor (151), 1991.
- Jean-Luc Pupier et collaborateurs, "Senones à travers les âges", Bulletin des Amis de la Bibliothèque de Senones, n° 3, Senones, 1983.
- Frédéric Seillière, Document pour servir à l'histoire de la Principauté de Salm en Vosges et de la Ville de Senones, sa capitale, réédition par les Editions Jean-Pierre Gyss, Strasbourg, 1982.
- Histoire des terres de Salm, Société Philomatique Vosgienne, Saint-Dié-des-Vosges, 1994.
