= Otto von Corvin =

German author (1812–1886)

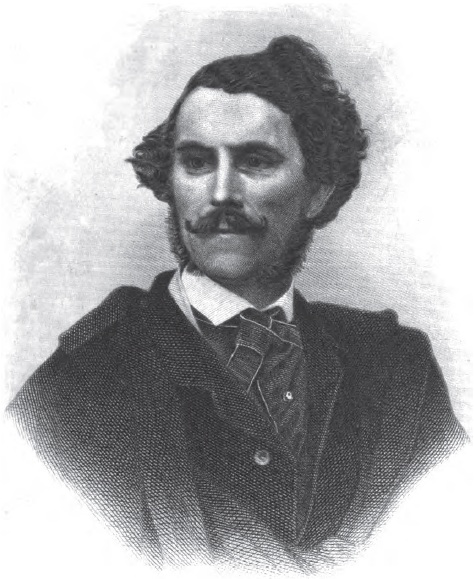
Otto von Corvin

Otto Julius Bernhard von Corvin-Wiersbitzki (12 October 1812 – 2 March 1886) was a German writer.

== Biography ==
Corvin was born in Gumbinnen (Prussia) to the Rittmeister, and later director of the postal administration, of Gumbinnen Friedrich August Heinrich von Corvin-Wiersbitzki. His parents divorced in his childhood and after his father's death in 1822 Corvin was raised by his mother, who had moved to Halberstadt. He attended military school in Potsdam and Berlin-Lichterfelde, eventually becoming a lieutenant in the Prussian Army.

He left the military in 1835 to devote himself to writing. His novels and dramas did not attract notice, but a book of instruction on swimming — he was very talented in this area having organized the swimming pool at his army post and taught the people there how to dive and swim — was quite popular. He also founded magazines on outdoor life and horses, the first of their kind in Germany, and they did well. With this success, he was able to marry. In Leipzig, he put out a sports almanac for 1844 and Taschenbuch für Jäger und Naturfreunde (Handbook for Hunters and Friends of Nature).

His circle of friends crystallized into the first literary club in Germany, and they waged a small war against the police and bureaucracy. An enthusiastic Protestant, he wrote historical studies of which Historische Denkmale des christlichen Fanatismus (Historical Monuments to Christian Fanaticism; 1845) is a typical title. This particular book was released in conjunction with the inauguration of the German Catholic movement in Leipzig, and was later republished as Der Pfaffenspiegel (1869) and supplemented by Die Geissler (3d ed., 1892–1893). A political magazine, Die Locomotive, was shut down by the government censors. His Illustrirte Weltgeschichte für das Volk (Popular Illustrated History of the World) did very well. In search of an effective and cheap reproduction technology for the illustrations in his History, he developed a process eventually called "Corviniello," later fine-tuned while he was in prison, which became widely used.

In 1848, he fought in the barricades in the French uprising. The French provisional government then offered him generous support for democratic uprisings in Germany, however his offer to the Frankfurt parliament to form a national army was sharply rebuffed. In 1848–1849, after participating in the Berlin uprising, he took part in the Baden revolt, first as a colonel of militia under Mieroslawski in Mannheim, then as chief of the general staff in Rastatt. In Rastatt, he along with many others, found himself trapped there on June 30 by the Prussians. In September 1849, a court martial condemned him to death, but the sentence was commuted to six years' solitary confinement, which he passed at Bruchsal.

Upon his release in 1855, Corvin went to London where he taught German and worked for Charles Dickens on All the Year Round and Household Words. In 1857 in Soden, he finished the memoirs of his prison experience. An attempted return to Germany at Hamburg was frustrated by police chicanery, and he returned to London, his memoirs finally being published in 1861 in Amsterdam. That year he traveled to the United States of America to cover the Civil War for The Times and Augsburg Allgemeine Zeitung, returning to Berlin in 1867 as a special correspondent for the New York Times.

In Berlin, the Corvins lived with Prince Felix Salm and his wife Agnes Salm-Salm, whom they had met in America. Corvin edited the Salms' memoirs of Mexico and Emperor Maximilian. He covered the Franco-Prussian War for the Vienna Neue Freie Presse, and papers in America, London and Germany. His experiences are described in his book In France with the Germans (1872). In 1878, he founded an association of German writers in Leipzig.

He died in 1886 in Wiesbaden.
