= Salm-Salm =

State of the Holy Roman Empire

County (Principality) of Salm-Salm Grafschaft (Fürstentum) Salm-Salm (German) Principauté de Salm-Salm (French)
- 1574–1793; 1802–1811
- Flag Coat of arms
- Status: State of the Holy Roman Empire
- Capital: Badonviller; Senones
- Government: Principality
- Historical era: Middle Ages, Modern Age
  - Partitioned from Salm-Dhaun: 1574
  - Partitioned to create Salm-Neuweiler: 1608
  - Raised to principality: 1739
  - Annexed by France: French First Republic 1793
  - Granted territories from Münster, with S-Kyrburg, to create unified Salm: Bishopric of Münster
  - Joined the Confederation of the Rhine: 1806
  - Annexed by France: 1811
  - Mediatised to Prussia: Kingdom of Prussia 1813
Preceded by	Succeeded by
Salm-Dhaun	First French Empire

The Principality of Salm-Salm (German: Fürstentum Salm-Salm; French: Principauté de Salm-Salm) was a state of the Holy Roman Empire. It was located in the present-day French departments of Bas-Rhin and Vosges; it was one of a number of partitions of Salm.

== History ==
Salm-Salm was created as a partition of Salm-Dhaun in 1574, and was raised from a County to a Principality in 1739 after being inherited and renamed by Count Nicholas Leopold of Salm-Hoogstraten. Salm-Salm was partitioned between itself and Salm-Neuweiler in 1608.

The last territorial partition occurred in 1751, when Salm-Salm reorganized its borders with the Duchy of Lorraine. From 1743 the Princes were also Dukes of Hoogstraten, with the seat at Hoogstraten Castle (Gelmelslot).

In 1790, after the French Revolution, the princes of Salm fled the territory and moved to their castle in Anholt, Westphalia, Anholt Castle. Salm-Salm then was besieged by the revolutionary army, which blocked food supplies from reaching the state. As a consequence, the population was forced to surrender to France. On 2 March 1793, the French National Convention declared Salm-Salm to be a part of the French Republic and attached it to the Department of the Vosges. This was recognized by the Holy Roman Empire in the Peace of Lunéville of 1801.

Some years later, in 1802/1803, together with Salm-Kyrburg, the prince of Salm-Salm was granted new territories formerly belonging to the Bishops of Münster (Westphalia). The new territory was governed in union with Salm-Kyrburg and was known as the Principality of Salm.

== Geography ==
In 1165, the original County of Salm was divided into the counties of Lower Salm, in the Ardennes, and the county of Upper Salm, situated in the Vosges mountains. In 1738, the County of Upper Salm was elevated to Principality of Salm-Salm.

The capital of Salm-Salm was first Badonviller, and from 1751 on, Senones. The second part of the name of Salm-Salm derives from Salm Castle near Salm (today La Broque).

At the end of its existence, Salm-Salm had an area of about 200 km^{2} (77 sq mi) and 10,000 inhabitants. It was separated from the main part of the Holy Roman Empire when most of Alsace was ceded to France in the 17th century. Until 1766, it was bordered by the Duchy of Lorraine to the west and by France to the east. After Lorraine became a part of France on 24 February 1766, Salm-Salm formed an exclave of the Holy Roman Empire surrounded by French territory.

The economy of Salm-Salm was mainly based on an iron mine near Grandfontaine.

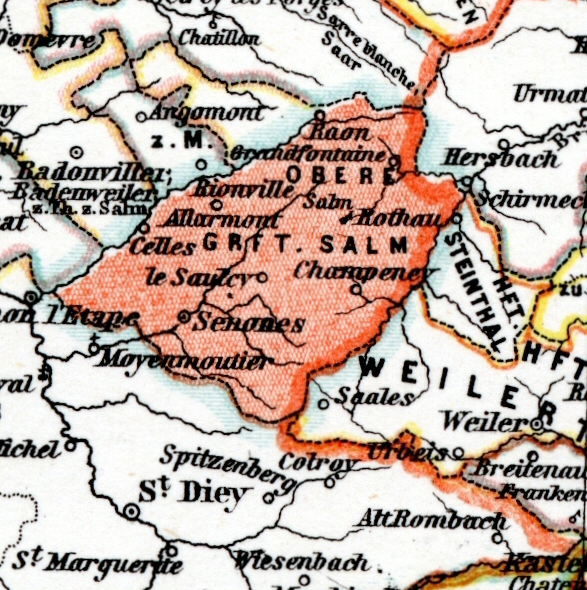
County of Upper Salm
(Obere Grafschaft Salm)

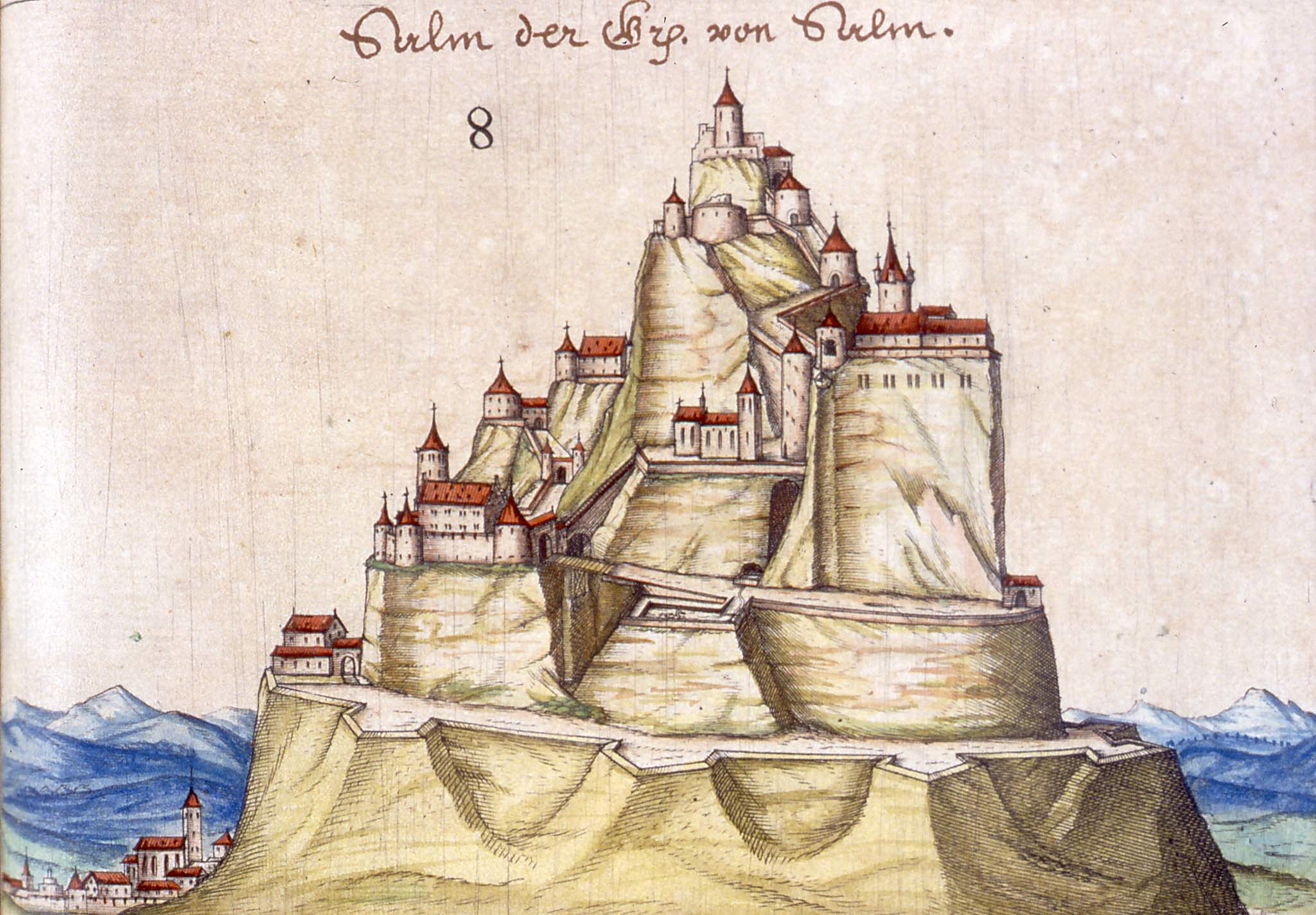
Salm Castle in 1589

== Rulers ==
=== Counts and Princes of Salm and Salm-Salm (1574–1738) ===
- Friedrich I, Count of Salm-Dhaun, Count of Salm-Salm 1574–1608 (1547–1608)
  - Philipp Otto, Count 1608–1634 (1576–1634), created 1st Prince of Salm 1623
    - Ludwig, Count and 2nd Prince 1634-1636 (1618–1636)
    - Leopold Philipp Karl, Count and 3rd Prince 1636–1663 (1620–1663)
      - Karl Theodor, Count and 4th Prince 1663–1710 (1645–1710)
        - Eleonore, Married to Conrard, 1st Duke d'Ursel.
          - Charles, 2nd Duke d'Ursel (1717–1775)
        - Ludwig Otto, Count and 5th Prince 1710–1738 (1674–1738)

At Ludwig Otto's death, the male line became extinct, and the county of Salm-Salm passed to descendants of Friedrich I's youngest son, Friedrich I Magnus (1606–1673). Eventually, the title Prince of Salm was assumed by his descendants as well.

=== Sovereign princes of Salm-Salm (1739–1813) ===
Princely arms of Salm-Salm

- Nikolaus Leopold of Salm-Hoogstraten, 1st Prince 1739–1770 (1701–1770), great-grandson of Friedrich I Magnus (see note under Counts)
  - Ludwig Karl Otto, 2nd Prince 1770–1778 (1721–1778)
  - Prince Maximilian Friedrich Ernst of Salm-Salm (1732-1773)
    - Konstantin Alexander, 3rd Prince 1778–1828 (1762–1828), mediatized 1813

=== Mediatised princes of Salm-Salm (1813–present) ===
- Konstantin Alexander, 3rd Prince 1778–1828 (1762–1828), mediatized 1813
  - Florentin, 4th Prince 1828–1846 (1786–1846)
    - Alfred, 5th Prince 1846–1886 (1814–1886)
      - Nikolaus, 6th Prince 1886–1908 (1838–1908)
      - Alfred, 7th Prince 1908–1923 (1846–1923)
        - Emanuel, Hereditary Prince of Salm-Salm (1871-1916)
          - Isabelle (1903-2009), one of the longest-lived members of any princely family.
          - Nikolaus Leopold, 8th Prince 1923–1988 (1906–1988), 8th Prince of Salm-Kyrburg 1951
            - Carl-Philipp, 9th Prince of Salm-Salm and of Salm-Kyrburg 1988–2024 (1933–2024), 14th Prince of Salm
              - Emanuel, 10th Prince of Salm-Salm and of Salm-Kyrburg 2024–present (born 1961), 15th Prince of Salm
              - Prince Philipp of Salm-Salm (born 1963)
                - Prince Wilhelm of Salm-Salm (born 2005)
              - Prince Clemens of Salm-Salm (born 1966)
        - Prince Franz Emanuel Konstantin of Salm-Salm (1876-1964)
          - Prince Franz Karl Alfred of Salm-Salm (1917–2011)
            - Prince Michael of Salm-Dahlberg (born 1953)
              - Prince Constantin of Salm-Dahlberg (born 1980)
              - Prince Felix of Salm-Dahlberg (born 1981)
            - Prince Franziskus-Hendrick of Salm-Salm (born 1963)
            - Prince Georg-Alfred of Salm-Salm (born 1969)
    - Prince Felix of Salm-Salm (1828–1870)
