= Francis Lützow =

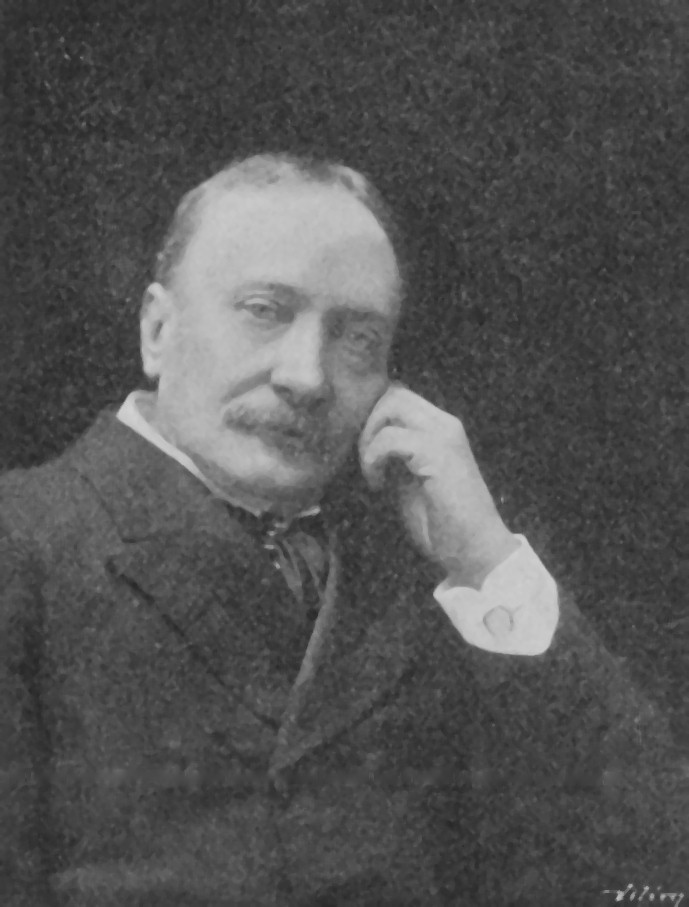
Francis Lützow in 1898

Count Francis Lützow (German: Franz Heinrich Hieronymus Valentin von Lützow, Czech: František Lützow; 21 March 1849 – 13 January 1916) was an Austrian author, historian, critic and revivalist.

== Early life ==
Francis Lützow was born on 21 March 1849 in Hamburg. He was the son of Franz Joseph Johann Nepomuk Gottfried von Lützow (1814–1897) and Henriette Seymour (1822–1909). His brother, Count Heinrich von Lützow, was a diplomat who served as the Austro-Hungarian Ambassador to Italy. His sister, Countess Rosa, married Prince Alfred zu Salm-Salm (younger brother of Prince Leopold zu Salm-Salm) in 1869.

He came from the Austro-Bohemian (Catholic) branch of the noble family of Lützow, originally from Mecklenburg, and was raised to the rank of Count in 1692. His maternal grandparents were Henry Augustus Seymour (an illegitimate son of the 2nd Marquess of Hertford) and Margaret Williams.

He was educated at Vienna and Innsbruck and followed a diplomatic career.

== Career ==
He was active in Bohemian politics and became a member of the Austrian parliament, serving in the House of Deputies, and Chamberlain to the Emperor Franz Joseph from 1881.

A tireless champion of Bohemian independence from the Austro-Hungarian Empire, he was a member of the Royal Society of Sciences in Bohemia, and of the Bohemian Academy. He was Ilchester lecturer at Oxford in 1904, and lectured at American universities in 1912.

=== Writing career ===
Perhaps his greatest accomplishments are his various books regarding the history of Bohemia, Prague, Slavic poetry, Historiography and Literature. His works were intentionally written in the English language and were thus more easily accessible to Western decision-makers who would eventually agree to the formation of an independent Czechoslovakia after the end of World War I. The first president of Czechoslovakia, Tomáš Garrigue Masaryk wrote a touching introduction to Lützow's 1939 edition of 'Bohemia, An Historical Sketch' and expressed gratitude for Lützow's various contributions to Czechoslovakia's independence.

== Personal life ==
On 18 January 1881, Lützow married Anna Gustava von Bornemann (1853–1932) in London.

Lützow died on 13 January 1916 in Montreux, Switzerland, at the age of 66. He was buried in the family tomb in Vamberk in the present-day Czech Republic.

== Published works ==
- History of Bohemian Literature, Heinemann. London (1899); (2nd ed. April 1907)
- The Story of Prague J. M. Dent & Co. London 1902; 2nd ed. 1907.
- Lectures on the Historians of Bohemia 1905 London: Henry Frowde.
- Life and Times of Master John Hus (1909) E.P. Dutton & Co. London 1909; (2nd ed. 1929)
- Bohemia An Historical Sketch J. M. Dent & Sons Ltd. London 1896; 2nd ed. 1910; 3rd ed. 1939.
- The Hussite Wars (1914) London: J. M. Dent & Sons New York
