= Anholt Castle =

Castle in Isselburg, Germany

Coordinates: 51°50′40.85″N 6°25′38.40″E

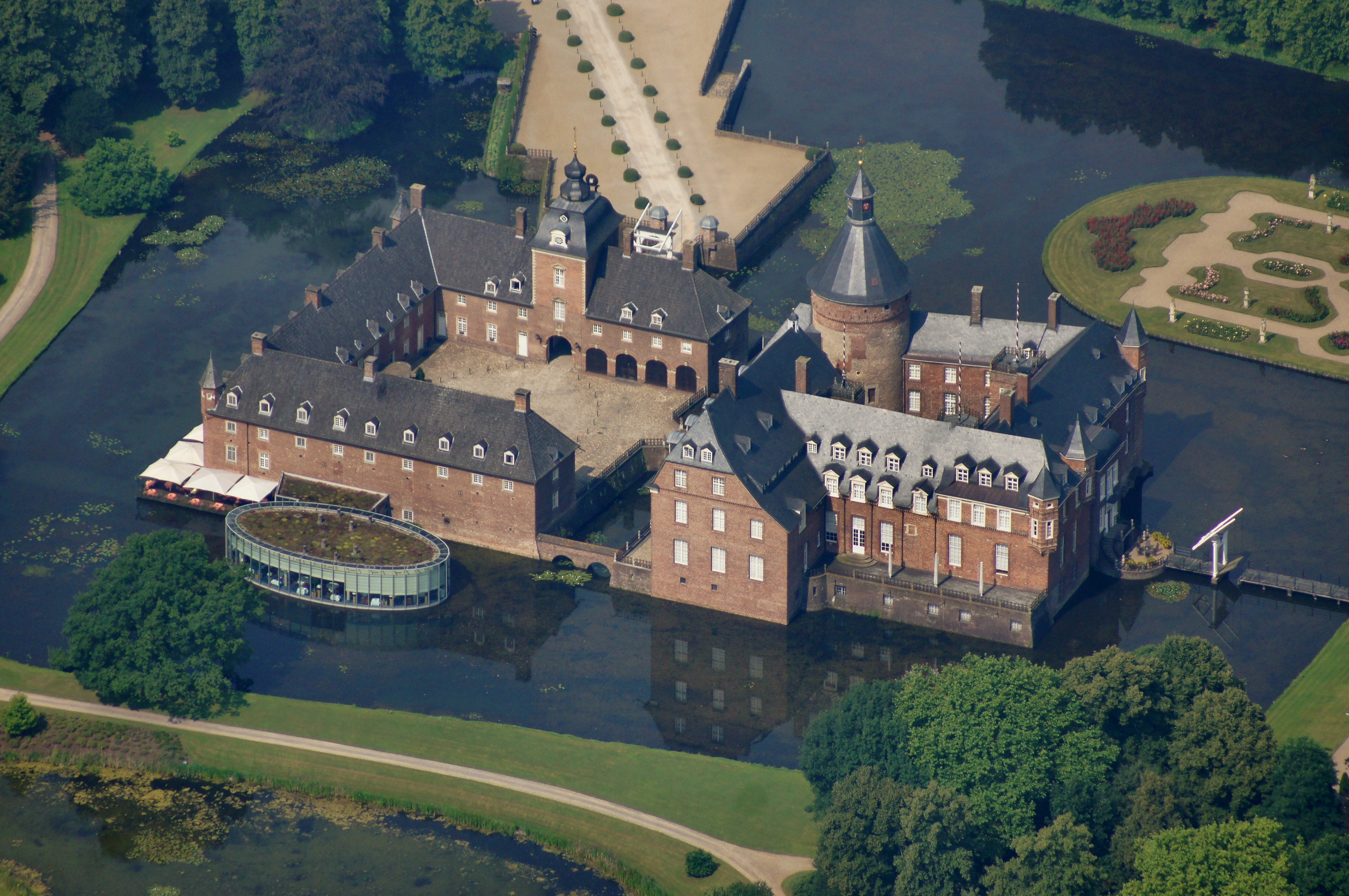
An aerial view of Anholt Castle (2014)

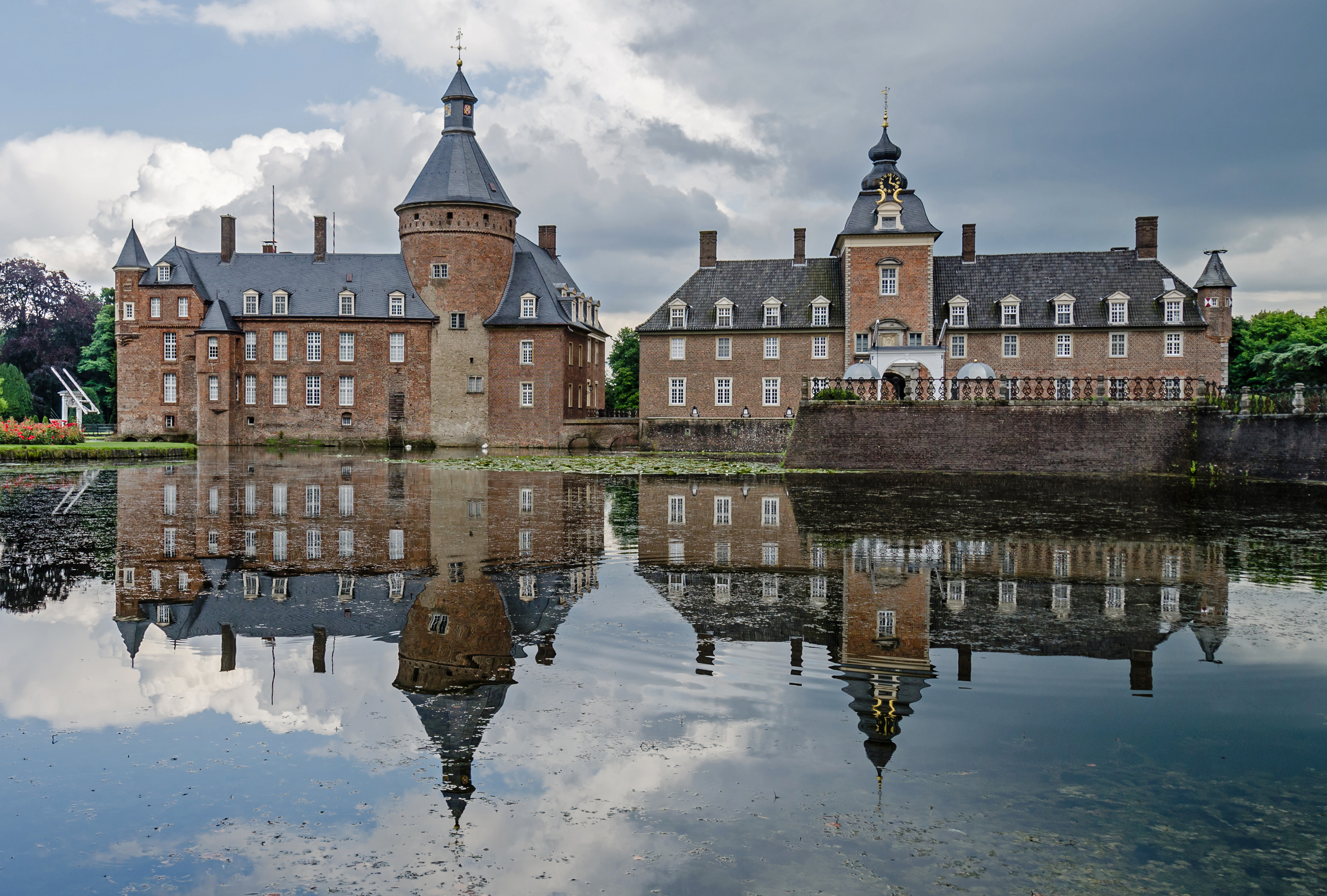
Western façade of Anholt Castle (2012)

Anholt Castle (German: Wasserburg Anholt or German: Schloss Anholt) is a monumental moated castle and former princely seat in the municipality of Isselburg, North Rhine-Westphalia, Germany, close to the Dutch border where the Münsterland meets the Lower Rhine region. First documented in the late 12th century as a strategic stronghold of the Prince-Bishopric of Utrecht, it developed into the imperially immediate Lordship of Anholt during the Middle Ages and, from 1647, the hereditary residence of the princely House of Salm-Salm. Dominated by its massive round Dicke Turm keep and encircled by a broad water defence fed by the river Issel, the complex is regarded as one of the largest and best preserved water castles in western Germany.

Architecturally, the present ensemble blends medieval foundations with a baroque remodelling carried out around 1700, when Prince Charles Theodore of Salm transformed the medieval fortress into a stately home, added formal gardens and unified the façades under slate roofs. Although 70 percent destroyed in 1945, Schloss Anholt was meticulously restored and now serves a triple role as private residence, museum and leisure destination. Visitors can tour richly furnished state rooms, view the state’s largest privately owned art collection (including works by Rembrandt, Jan van Goyen, and Gerard ter Borch), stroll through reconstructed baroque and English landscape gardens, and enjoy amenities such as a hotel restaurant, wildlife park and golf course—all of which make the castle a cultural landmark and economic hub for the region.

== History ==
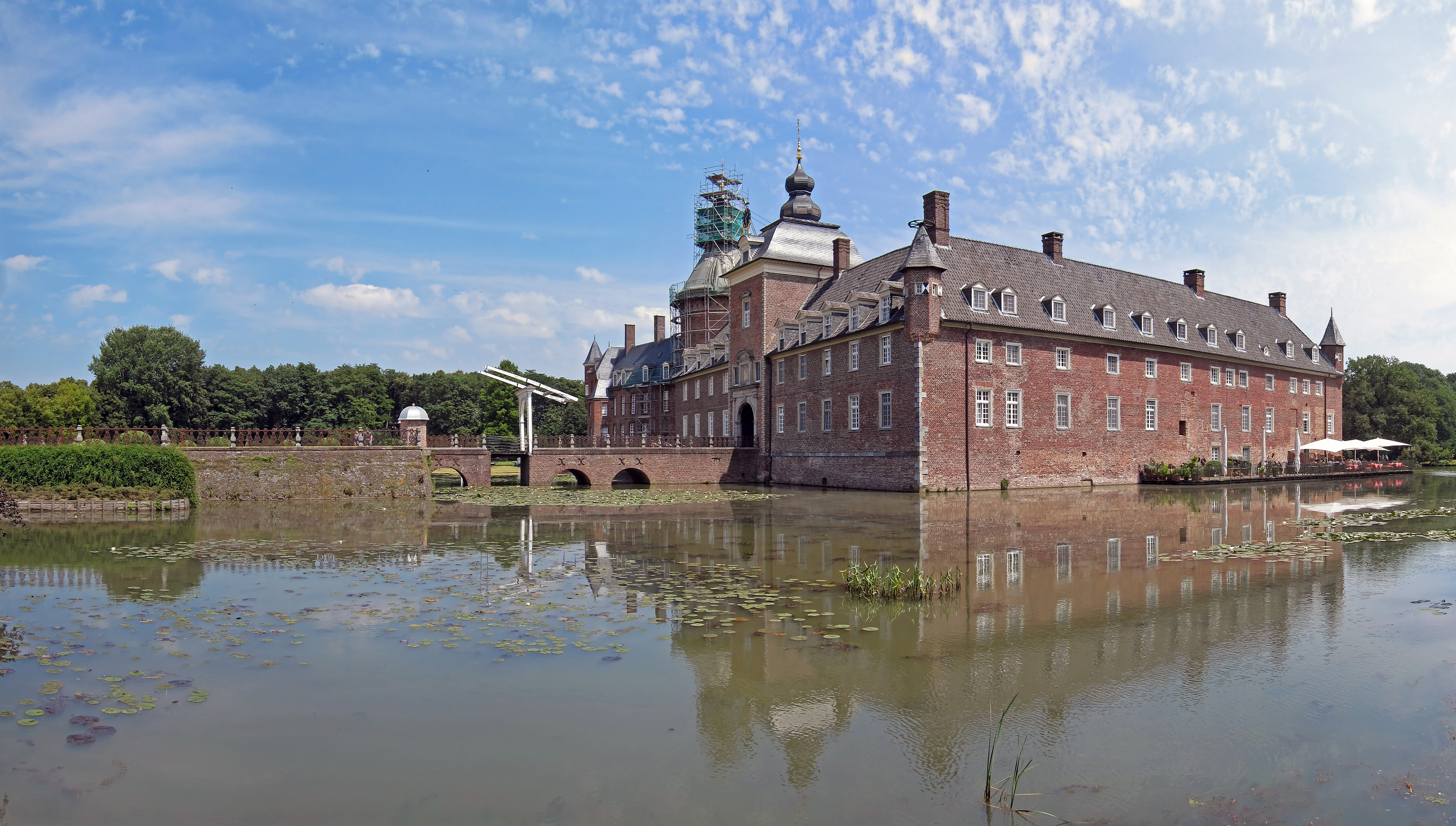
South side of Anholt Castle

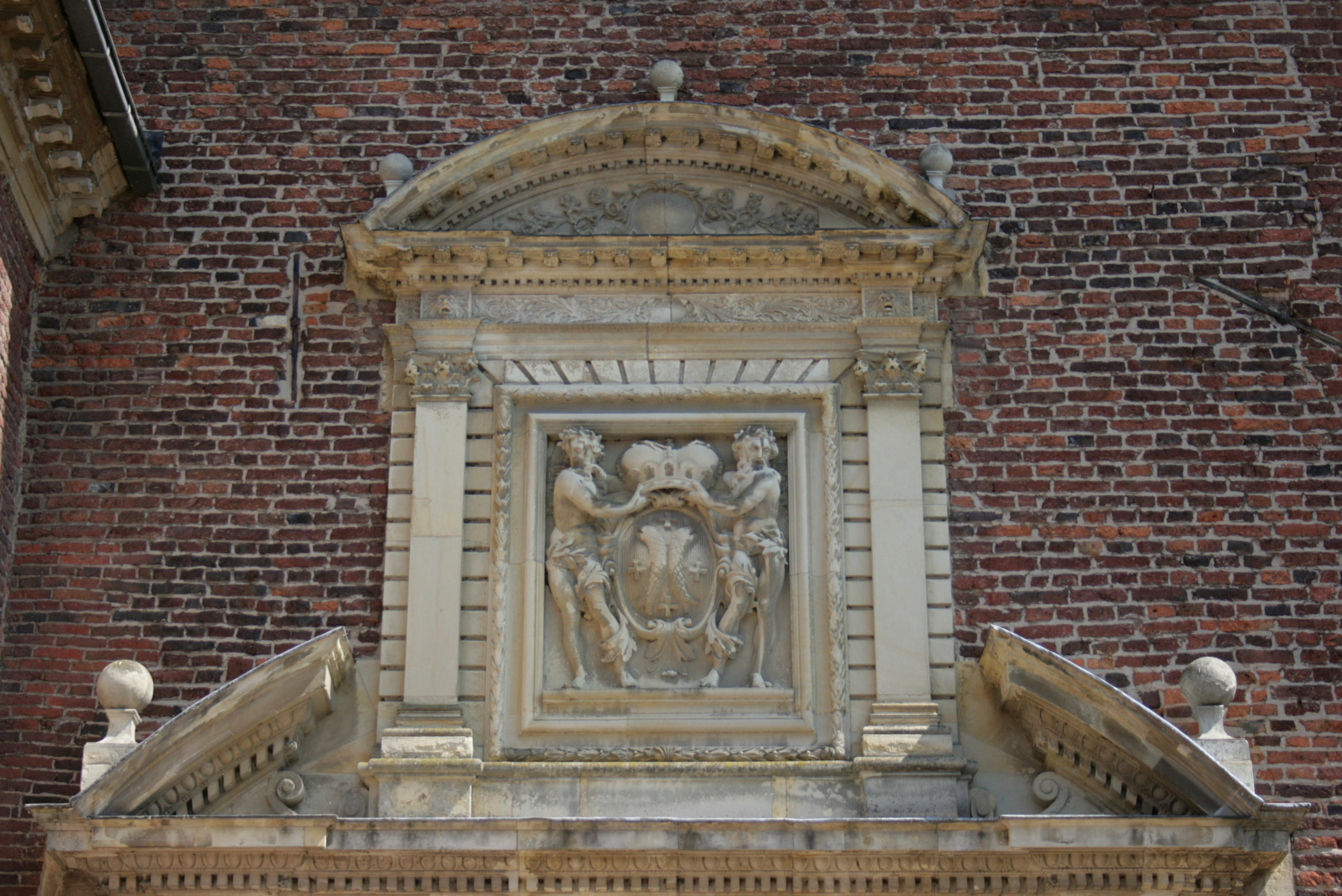
Arms of Salm above the portal (Prince Charles Theodore of Salm)

In 1169, a Lord of Zuylen "of Anholt" appears for the first time as a vassal of Utrecht bishop Godfrey van Rhenen. Historians therefore assume the water castle was built before that year. By the time of Stephan IV of Zuylen († c. 1347), who freed Anholt’s inhabitants from serfdom on 25 May 1347, the feudal tie to Utrecht had ended and the site had become an imperial immediate lordship within the Holy Roman Empire, later part of the Lower Rhenish–Westphalian Circle.

When the Anholt branch of the Zuylens died out in 1380, castle and lordship passed via Herberga, daughter of Diederik II van Zuylen, to her husband Hermann III of Gemen. In 1402, their daughter Margaretha married Gysbert of Bronkhorst‑Batenburg, handing Anholt to the Bronkhorst family; Emperor Sigismund confirmed their rights in 1431.

The Guelders Wars (1487 – 1499) first thrust Anholt into the wider European power struggle between Duke Charles of Egmond and the coalition of King later Emperor Maximilian I and John II, Duke of Cleves. Gysbert’s son Jakob I von Bronckhorst Batenburg, lord of Anholt, sided with Maximilian; Charles retaliated with an abortive coup against the castle in 1499 and returned with a full siege in 1512. After three months—a garrison weakened by plague and short supplies—Anholt capitulated and remained a Guelders possession for a quarter century. Dietrich III von Bronckhorst negotiated its recovery in 1537, though only by paying heavy war contributions and granting Duke Charles open access; Emperor Charles V absolved the lordship of these obligations three years later, restoring the family’s hard won status as an immediate Imperial territory.

That immunity proved fragile. During the opening phase of the Eighty Years’ War, the Protestant Dutch Geuzen demanded Anholt’s adhesion to the Union of Utrecht; Catholic lord Dietrich von Bronckhorst refused and—trusting in safe conduct—opened the town gates for parley, only to see it looted and burned until relief forces from Duke William of Jülich-Cleves-Berg arrived. The Thirty Years’ War brought a second cycle of occupation and plunder. Amid the turmoil, Emperor Ferdinand II elevated Dietrich IV and his brother Johann Jakob to Imperial Counts (1621), but the male line ended in 1649. In anticipation, Dietrich IV had already transferred the county in 1647 to his son in law Count Leopold Philipp Karl zu Salm, ushering in the continuous ownership of the House of Salm Salm.

Under Prince Charles Theodore of Salm (1645–1710) Anholt emerged from its war scarred shell as a fashionable Baroque-style residence. Between 1697 and 1703 the Milanese architect Tommaso Tommassini reshaped the outer bailey; around 1700 the medieval keep gained its soaring slate clad spire, all façades were rendered and ruled to imitate ashlar, and a two storey garden pavilion opened the house to newly laid French parterres. Courtly ambition matched architecture: a distinguished picture gallery began to form.

With the death of Charles’s Theodore son, Prince Louis Otto the main branch of the princely House of Salm died out. His daughter, Dorothea married a distant cousin, Count Nikolaus Leopold zu Salm-Salm, who was first elevated Duke of Hoogstraten and later Imperial prince of Salm-Salm by emperor Charles VI. Next to Anholt, the main princely residence was the abbey‑town of Senones in the Vosges until revolutionary forces expelled them in 1793. Further, there was Hoogstraten Castle (Gelmelslot) near Antwerpen.

Revolutionary upheavals redrew the map but left Anholt in princely hands. The lordship was merged with neighbouring Münster lands in 1802 to create the micro state Principality of Salm, annexed by Napoleonic France in 1810 and awarded to Prussia at the Congress of Vienna (1815). While sovereignty was lost, the Salm Salm family retained castle and estate, which today is one of the few large estates in North Rhine‑Westphalia still privately owned.

During the Second World War, seventy percent of Anholt Castle was destroyed in spring 1945. The then-owner Prince Nikolaus Leopold zu Salm‑Salm immediately began restoration of the castle and integrated tourism into the funding concept. In 1947 and 1950 the "Anholt Circle" of architects—including Rudolf Wolters, Ernst Neufert, Friedrich Tamms and others—met here and offered ideas for rebuilding the town and castle.

The family again lives in the restored castle; large parts are open to the public. Besides the main house, visitors can tour the park (admission), stay in the on‑site hotel/restaurant with water pavilion and terraces, or play at the golf club.

== Architecture ==
=== Main castle ===
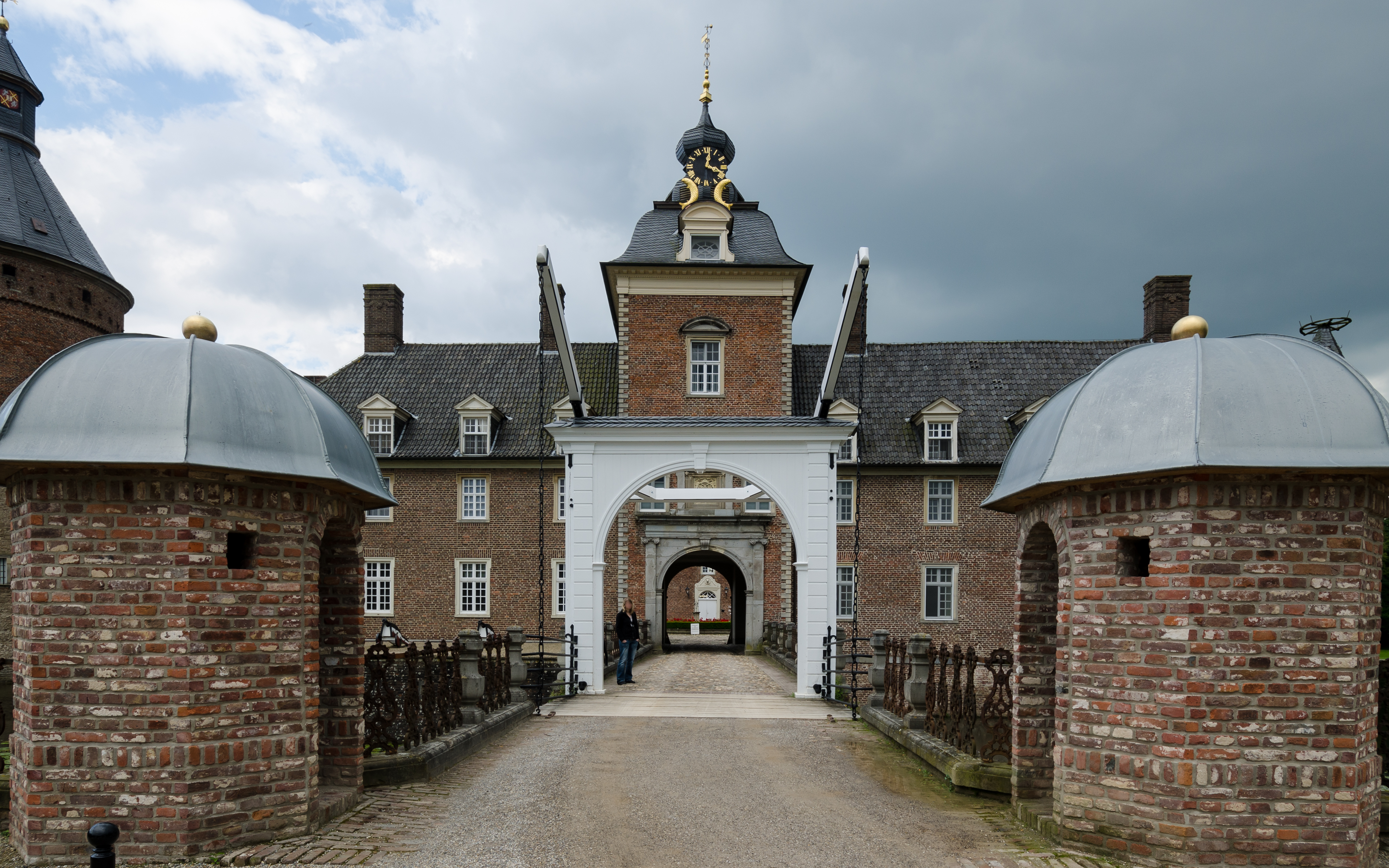
Castle gate (east front)

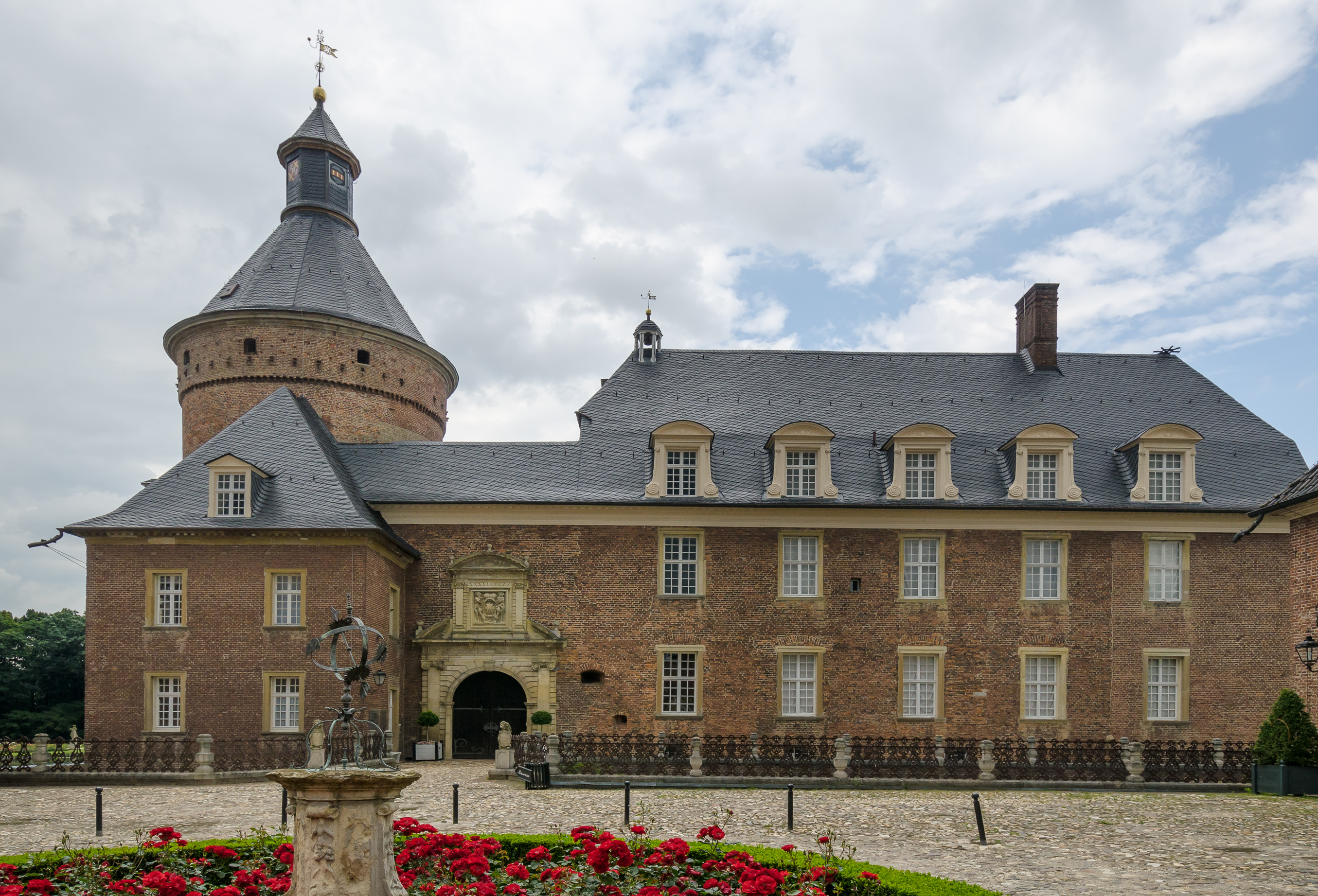
Residential wing of the main castle

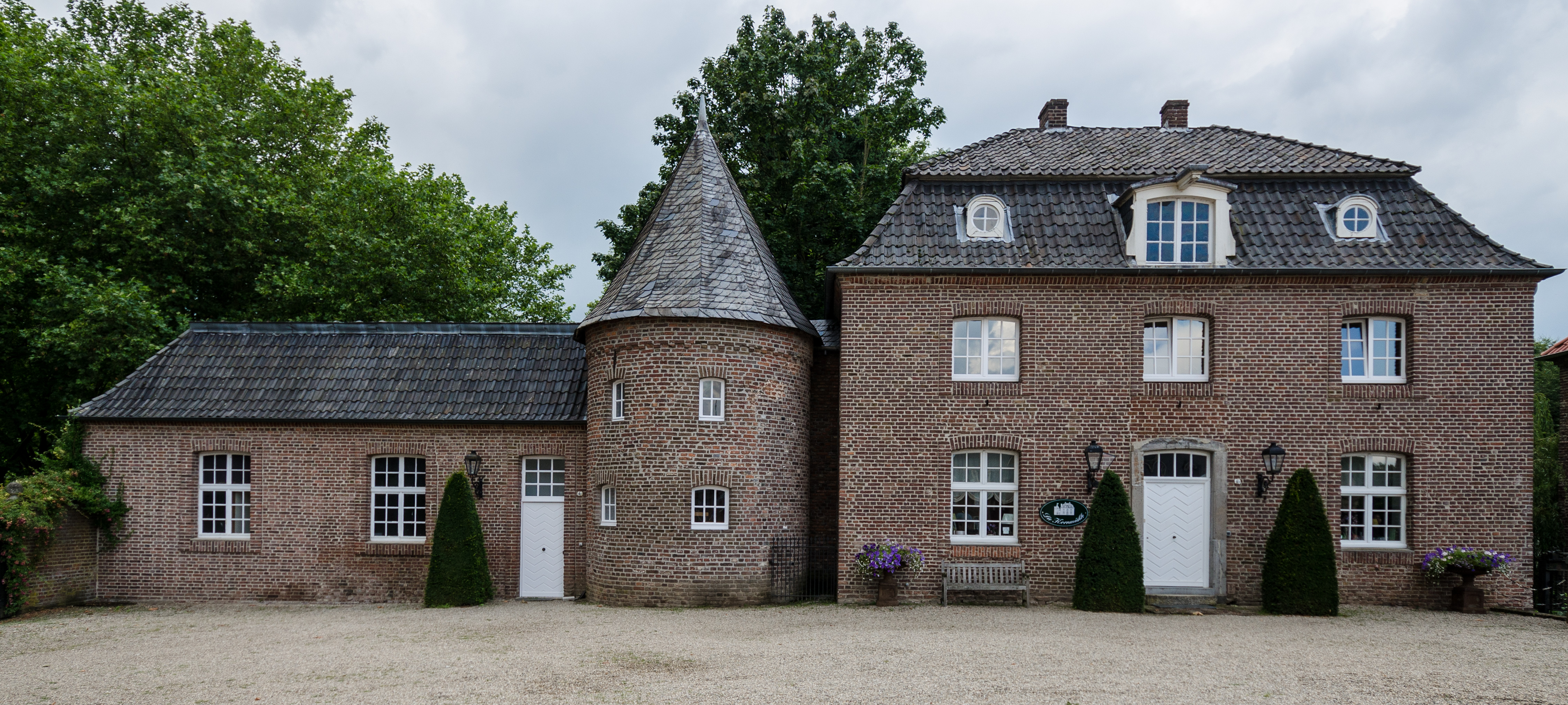
Part of the outer bailey

The earliest (pre‑1169) phase comprised the almost 11 metre‑wide round keep ("Thick Tower"), a small dwelling in today’s north‑east corner, and an oval curtain wall. The keep’s elevated entrance lay about 7 metres above present courtyard level; the dungeon was below. Built on swampy ground, the tufa walls stood on timber piles.

In the 14th century the inner bailey was greatly enlarged. Residential wings were added east and south of the original house; the west and north sides were still defensive walls with hexagonal turrets. In the 16th century those fronts were rebuilt for living space and two stair‑towers added.

Around 1700 Prince Charles Theodore, Prince of Salm remodelled Anholt into a representative baroque-style palace: the Thick Tower gained its present tall spire, all roofs were unified in slate, façades were rendered and scored to imitate ashlar, and a two‑storey pavilion on the north side linked house and park.

=== Outer bailey ===
The "Unterhof" dates to the first expansion; excavations show it already had today’s footprint. Entry is still through the "Bell Tower", whose armorial stones of Emperor Charles V (1540) and Duke Charles of Egmond (1512) recall Guelders occupation. The bailey was rebuilt 1697‑1703 to plans by Milanese architect Tommaso Tommassini.

== Park and gardens ==
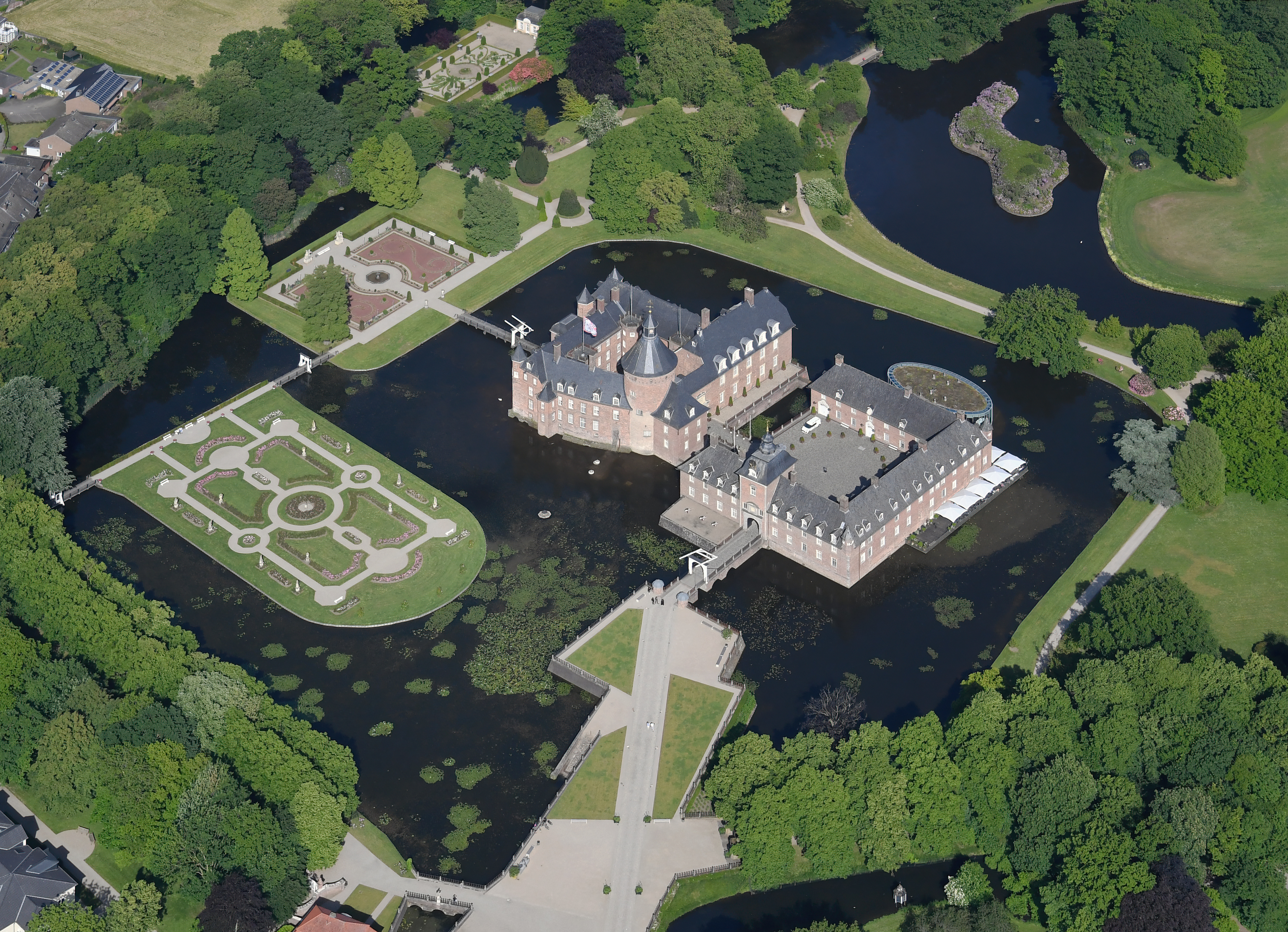
Castle with moat and grounds

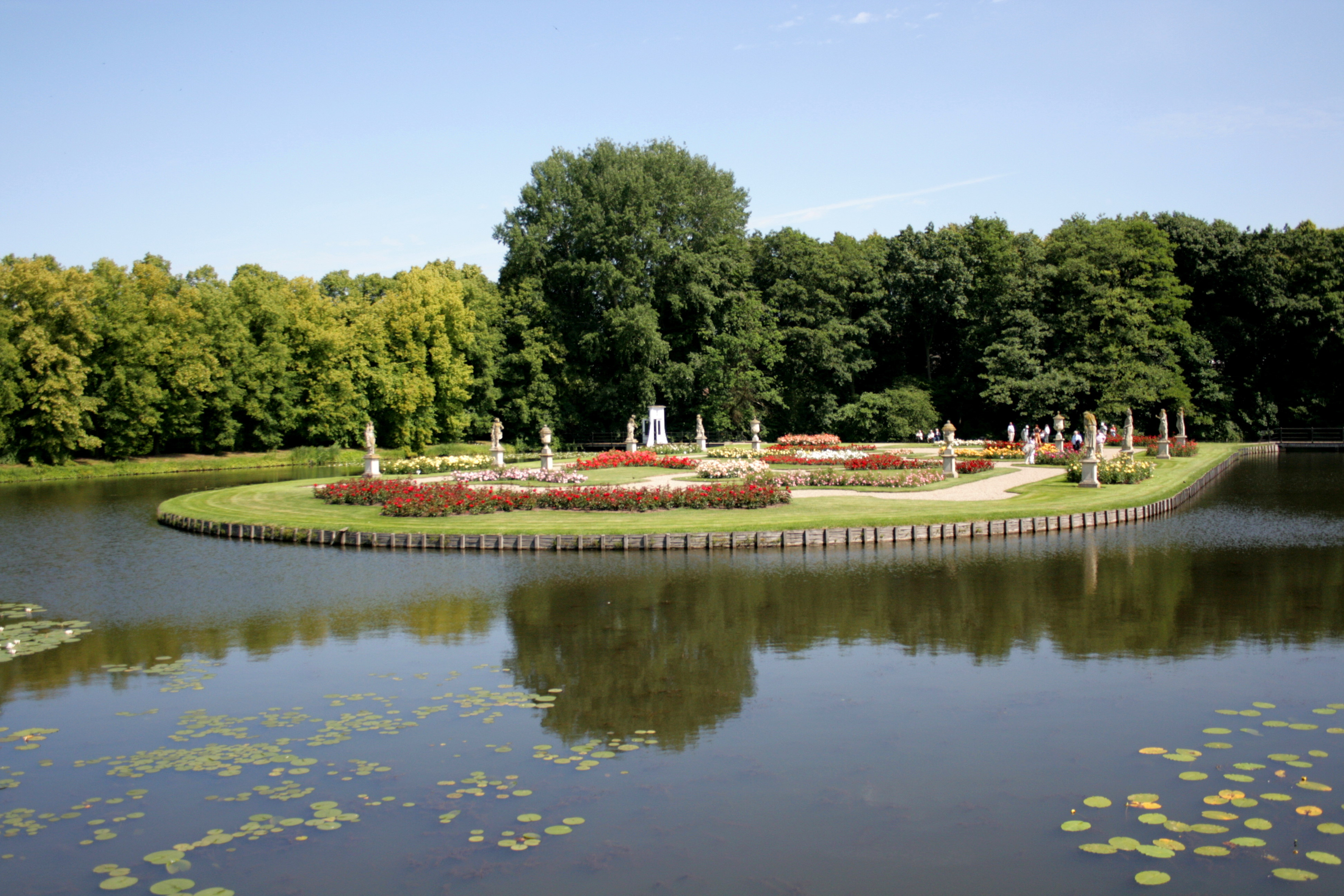
Baroque garden

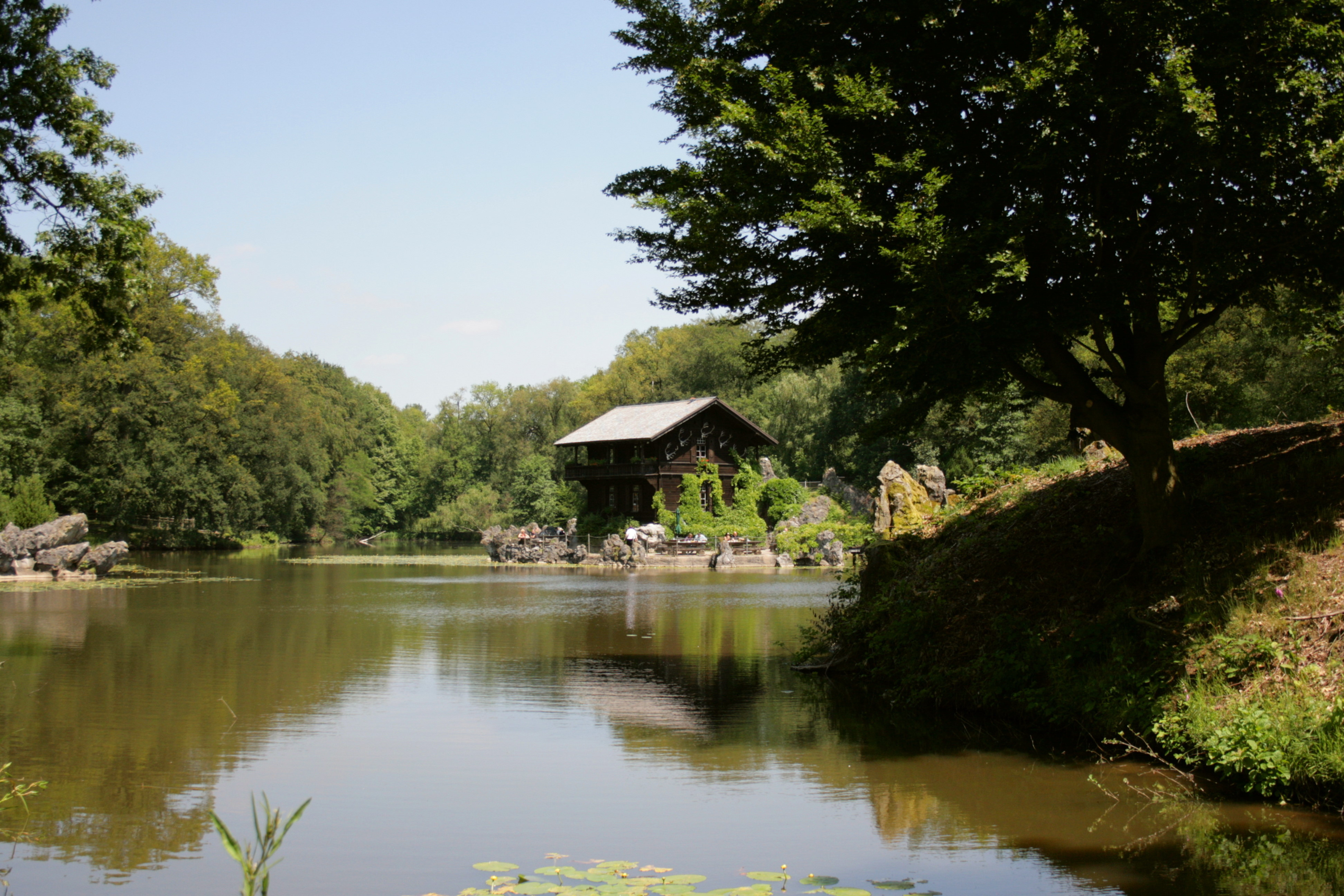
In the ‘‘Anholter Schweiz’’

The first gardens (18th century) followed French formal designs. From 1831, basis a commission of prince Florentin the Düsseldorf court gardener Maximilian Friedrich Weyhe – and from 1858 the English landscape architect Edward Milner – transformed parts into an English landscape garden, adding canals and ponds; the park was enlarged overall. Destroyed in 1945, the gardens were reconstructed 1962‑1995, partly in their original Baroque style.

Between 1892 and 1900, Prince Leopold zu Salm-Salm created the Leopold Park, inspired by Lake Lucerne, with a miniature lake, artificial rocks and a Swiss chalet. Converted to a game reserve in the early 20th century and rebuilt after Second World War, it opened to the public in 1966 as the Anholter Schweiz wildlife park.

== Princely Art Collections ==
Opened to the public in 1966, the main castle displays aristocratic life from the 17th, 18th and 19th centuries. Highlights include the largest private painting collection in North Rhine‑Westphalia—with works by Rembrandt (Diana Bathing with Actaeon and Callisto), Jan van Goyen, Gerard ter Borch (portrait of Gesina ter Borch as a shepherdess), Lucas Cranach the Elder and others—alongside period interiors, an armoury and extensive porcelain. Much was saved in the Second World War by storage in a mine tunnel.

The family archive also preserves the lead bullet that killed Emperor Maximilian I of Mexico on 19 June 1867; his aide Felix Salm-Salm brought it home.

=== Library ===
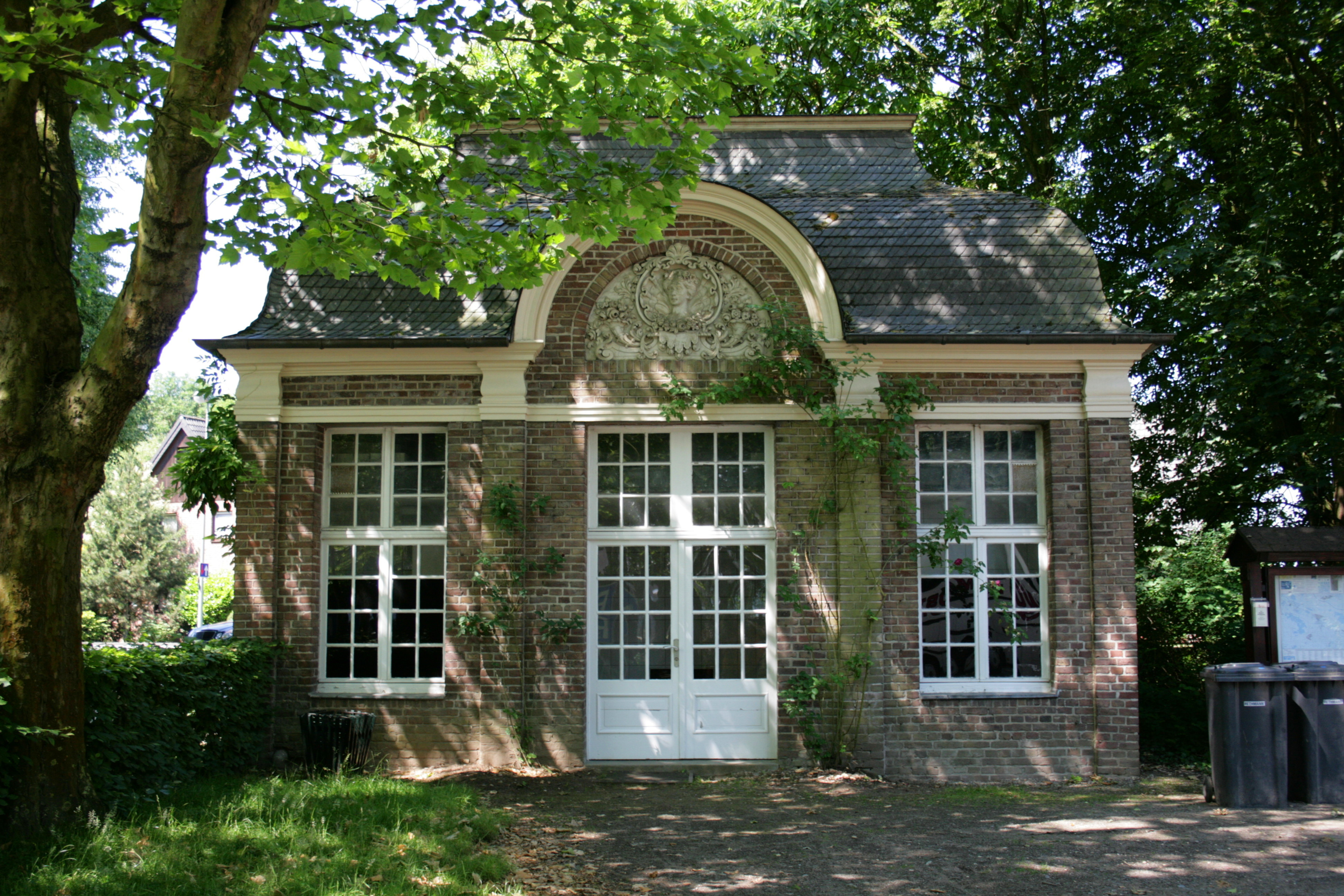
Orangery

The 230 m² neoclassical library hall (completed 1860) is also accessible. Holdings include the dissolved Cistercian library of Groß‑Burlo, the Bronckhorst‑Batenburg collection (1400‑1650) and the Salm‑Salm library (1650‑present).

== Film location ==
Anholt Castle has served as a set for the ZDF series Rivalen der Rennbahn (1989) and the ARD fairy‑tale film Cinderella (2011, Sechs auf einen Streich).

== Literature ==
- Eberhard G. Neumann: Wasserburg Anholt. Große Baudenkmäler 294. Munich/Berlin 1976 (PDF).
- Silke Parras: Der Marstall des Schlosses Anholt (16.–18. Jahrhundert). Berlin 2006, ISBN 3‑86504‑169‑8.
- Nikolaus Leopold zu Salm‑Salm: Wasserburg Anholt. Kleine Kunstführer 1681. 3rd ed., Regensburg 2003.
- Gregor Spor: Wie schön, hier zu verträumen. Schlösser am Niederrhein. Bottrop/Essen 2001, pp. 66–67.
- Josef Tinnefeld: Die Herrschaft Anholt. Hildesheim 1913 (PDF).
