= Felix Salm-Salm =

German soldier

Prince Felix of Salm-Salm
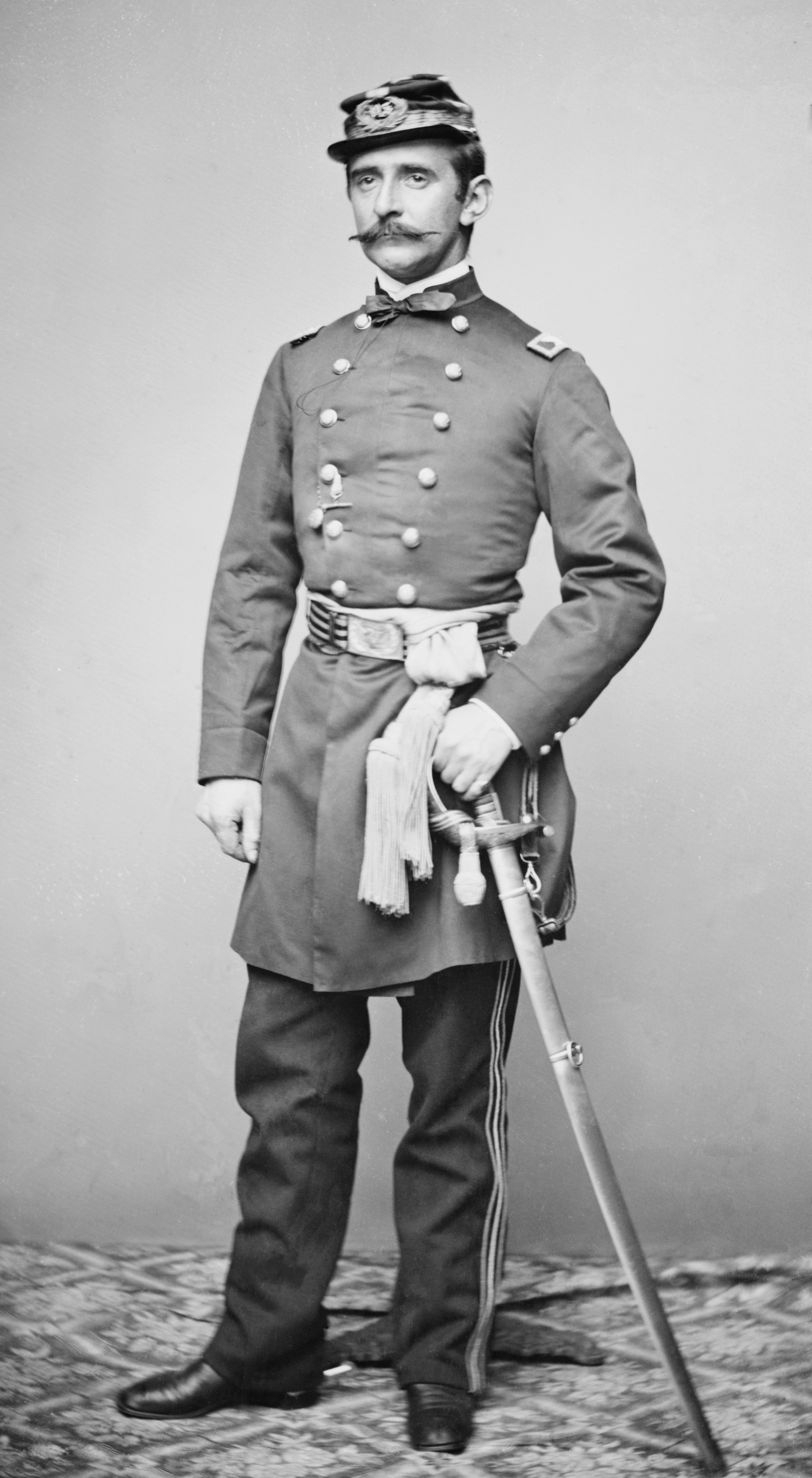
- Prince Felix of Salm-Salm during his service in the American Civil War
- Born: 25 December 1828; Anholt, Westphalia, Kingdom of Prussia
- Died: 18 August 1870 (aged 41); Gravelotte, France
- Burial place: Anholt
- Spouse: Agnes Leclerc Joy
- Relatives: Florentin, 4th Prince of Salm-Salm (father)
- Military career
- Allegiance: Kingdom of Prussia; Austrian Empire; United States of America (Mexico) Second Mexican Empire
- Branch: Prussian Army; United States Army
- Service years: 1846–1854, 1868–1870 (Prussian Army); 1861–1865 (US Army); 1866–1867 (Imperial Mexican Army)
- Rank: Major (Prussian Army); Brevet Brigadier General (Union Army); Colonel (Imperial Mexican Army)
- Commands: (New York (state)) 8th New York Volunteer Infantry Regiment (New York (state)) 68th New York Volunteer Infantry Regiment
- Conflicts: First Schleswig War; Austro-Sardinian War; American Civil War; French intervention in Mexico; Franco-Prussian War

Prince Felix Constantin Alexander Johann Nepomuk of Salm-Salm (25 December 1828 – 18 August 1870) was a Prussian military officer of princely birth and a soldier of fortune.

Salm-Salm served in the Schleswig-Holstein Army (Prussian Army), Austrian Army, the Union Army during the American Civil War, the army of Emperor Maximilian in Mexico and thereafter in the Prussian Army. He was killed in action during the Franco-Prussian War.

== Life ==
Prince Felix Constantin Alexander Johann Nepomuk of Salm-Salm, was born at Anholt Castle, the Residenz of the former Principality of Salm, which had been incorporated into the Prussian Province of Westphalia by 1815. He was the third and youngest son of Prince Florentin, the formerly reigning Prince of Salm-Salm (1786–1846), and his wife Flaminia di Rossi (1795–1840), a Corsican noblewoman and niece of Prince Felice Pasquale Baciocchi. The 1815 Congress of Vienna confirmed the Salm dynasty's loss of sovereignty but recognized the retention of royal privileges of the Princes of Salm-Salm as a Mediatized House in the German Confederation.

Felix grew up training to be a soldier at a cadet-school in Berlin and became an officer in the Prussian 11th Hussar Regiment in 1846. Early on he participated in the First Schleswig War between northern Germany and Denmark. Severely wounded in a skirmish near Aarhus on 18 May 1849, he demonstrated bravery in battle. After the war he joined the Austrian army, serving in the Austro-Sardinian War of 1859. However, his erratic way of life alienated his family; substantial gambling debts as well as several scandals and duels finally forced him to emigrate.

In 1861, he came to the United States and offered his services to the Union Army in the American Civil War. He was given a colonel's commission and assigned to the staff of Brigadier General Louis Blenker. It was at this time that he began to court an American woman named Agnes Leclerc Joy. He had met her at a reception given by President Abraham Lincoln in Washington, D. C., where he was introduced by the Prussian envoy Friedrich von Gerolt. Felix and Agnes would marry morganatically in August 1862. Agnes Salm-Salm would end up joining Felix on the battlefield because she could not bear being without him. That winter he took command of the 8th New York Volunteer Infantry Regiment (which decided Gustav Struve to resign in protest), but would only remain there through the winter.

In February, 1864, he was put under arrest for falsely representing himself as colonel of the 68th New York Volunteer Infantry Regiment and enriching himself by raising funds from young officers who expected that he could obtain commissions for them in his regiment. He was eventually released and actually appointed colonel of New York's 68th in June, 1864, serving under Brigadier General James B. Steedman in Tennessee and Georgia, he took part in the Battle of Nashville, and toward the end of the war was assigned to the command of the post at Atlanta. Salm-Salm was mustered out of the volunteers on November 30, 1865. On January 13, 1866, President Andrew Johnson nominated him for appointment to the grade of brevet brigadier general, to rank from April 13, 1865, and the U.S. Senate confirmed the appointment on March 12, 1866.

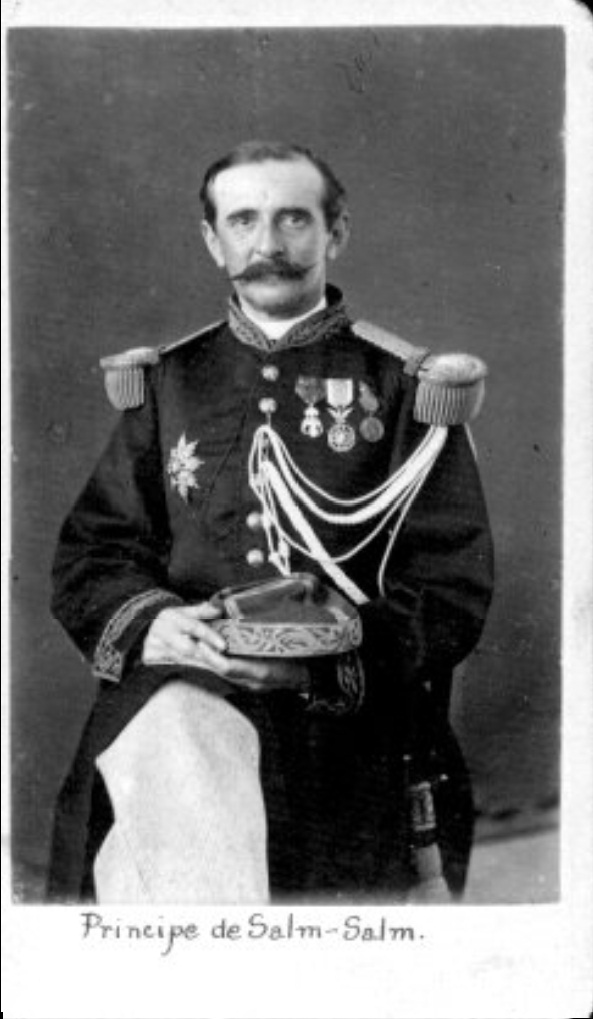
Salm-Salm in Mexican uniform

After the American Civil War was over, Salm-Salm offered his services to the Habsburg's Emperor Maximilian I of Mexico, and embarked for Mexico in February, 1866. Maximilian was actively promoting American soldiers to migrate to Mexico after the war to improve relations with the country. Salm-Salm was in an unusual position because he had fought for the Union while most of the Americans who moved to Mexico after the Civil War had fought for the Confederacy. By the summer he was appointed colonel and became the Emperor's aide-de-camp and chief of household. He was captured at Querétaro along with the emperor but not before he made a brave charge with his hussar cavalry in an attempt to save Maximilian from the surrounding Mexican Republican army under Benito Juárez. Together with the Emperor and his highest-ranking generals Tomás Mejía Camacho and Miguel Miramón he was sentenced to death by firing squad. Thanks to the tireless efforts of his wife (who had also tried to obtain a pardon for the Emperor Maximilian) he was pardoned by Juárez and released from custody in December 1867. During his captivity, he was promoted to the rank of brigadier general.

Soon after, he returned to Europe and re-entered the Prussian Army as major in the 4th Guards Grenadiers regiment. He was killed at Saint-Privat-la-Montagne during the Battle of Gravelotte in the Franco-Prussian War. His faithful wife Agnes who again had joined him, serving as a nurse on the battlefield, had his mortal remains transferred to the family crypt in Anholt Castle, Germany.

His memoirs were edited by German author Otto von Corvin. The fate of Prince Salm-Salm was later perpetuated in the colportage novels by Karl May.

== Works ==
- Queretaro: Blätter aus meinem Tagebuch in Mexico (in German). Vol. 1. Kröner. 1868.
- Queretaro: Blätter aus meinem Tagebuch in Mexico (in German). Vol. 2. Kröner. 1868.
- My Diary in Mexico in 1867, including the Last Days of the Emperor Maximillian. Vol. 1. London: Richard Bently. 1868. (translated into English)
- My Diary in Mexico in 1867, including the Last Days of the Emperor Maximillian. Vol. 2. London: Richard Bently. 1868. (translated into English)
