= Anne Emmanuel, 8th Duke of Croÿ =

French soldier

Coat of arms of Croÿ-Solre

Anne-Emmanuel-Ferdinand-François de Croÿ Prince of Solre and Duke of Croÿ (10 September 1743 – 15 December 1803) was a French soldier of the 18th century who attained the rank of Maréchal de camp. He served as a member of the National Constituent Assembly of 1789 representing the Bailiwick of Le Quesnoy, Hainaut.

He had previously served as a member of the Assembly of Notables in 1788 and 1789.

Withdrawing from France during the French Revolution, he received the sovereignty of Dülmen in Westphalia after the Congress of Ratisbon (1797). Anne was the only son of Emmanuel de Croÿ-Solre, the 7th Duke of Croÿ.

He became Sovereign Prince of Dülmen in 1803 after the Reichsdeputationshauptschluss.

He was father of Cardinal Gustave Maximilien Juste de Croÿ-Solre.
