= Schlinge =

Schlinge may refer to:

- Schlinge (river), a river of North Rhine-Westphalia, Germany, and Gelderland, Netherlands
- Die Schlinge, a single from the German industrial metal group Oomph!
