= Oude IJssel =

River in Germany and the Netherlands

Oude IJssel Issel
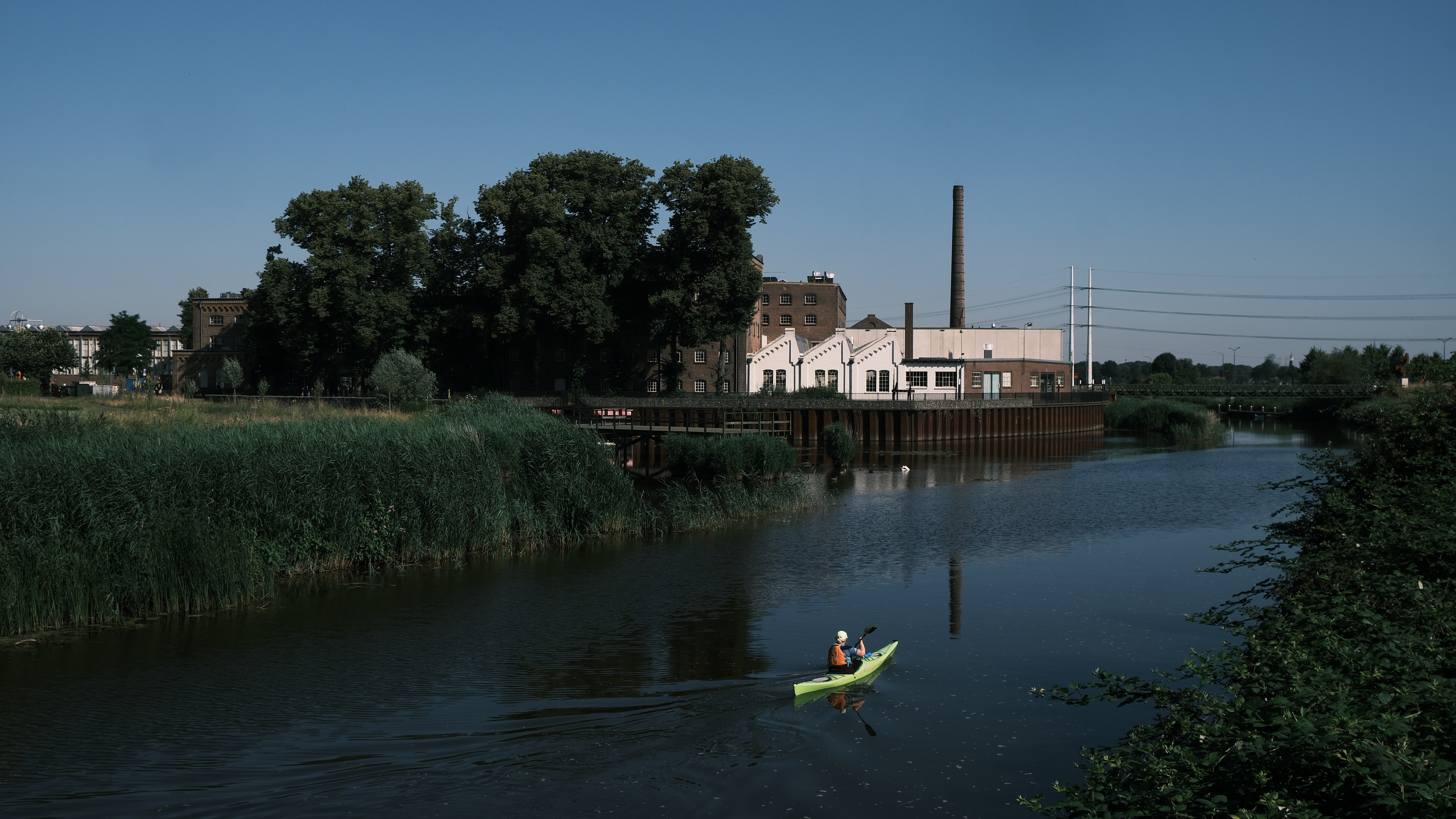
- Ulft, DRU Industriepark

Location
- Countries: Netherlands and Germany

Physical characteristics
- Source
  - location: near Raesfeld, Westphalia, Germany
  - coordinates: 51°47′40.6″N 6°49′49.8″E
  - elevation: 55.5 m (182 ft)
- Mouth
  - location: near Doesburg, in the IJssel, Gelderland, Netherlands
  - coordinates: 52°0′45.9″N 6°7′40.9″E
  - elevation: 5 m (16 ft)
- Length: 81.7 km (50.8 mi)
- Basin size: 1,214 km^{2} (469 sq mi)
- Discharge
  - location: Doesburg
  - average: 10.5 m^{3}/s (370 cu ft/s)

Basin features
- Tributaries
  - left: Waalse Water
  - right: Bocholter Aa → Aa Strang, Schlinge (river) → Bielheimerbeek
- Progression: IJssel→ IJsselmeer

The Oude IJssel (Dutch, pronounced [ˌʌudə ˈʔɛisəl], literally old IJssel) or Issel (German, pronounced [ˈɪsl̩]) is a river in Germany and the Netherlands approximately 82 km (51 mi) long. It is a right tributary of the river IJssel. Oude IJssel is Dutch for "Old IJssel"; the Oude IJssel was the upper course of the IJssel until the connection with the Rhine was dug, possibly in the Roman era.

This connection made the Rhine the largest contributor to the flow of the IJssel, although only a relatively small amount of the total flow of the Rhine made its way into the system. Various tributaries can sometimes add water to the total flow of the river, for example the Berkel and the Schipbeek. The IJssel river is the only branch of the Rhine delta that consumes tributary rivers instead of giving birth to distributary rivers. The latter only happens at the last part of the river, where the small IJssel Delta is created.

The Oude IJssel begins near Borken in North Rhine-Westphalia, Germany. It flows southwest until it nearly reaches the Rhine near Wesel, then it turns northwest. After Isselburg it crosses the border with the Netherlands and enters the province of Gelderland. It flows through the municipality Oude IJsselstreek, named in 2005 after the river, where the larger Aa Strang (Bocholter Aa) issues into the river (at Ulft). The river moves on to the town of Doetinchem and joins the IJssel in Doesburg.

== Gallery ==
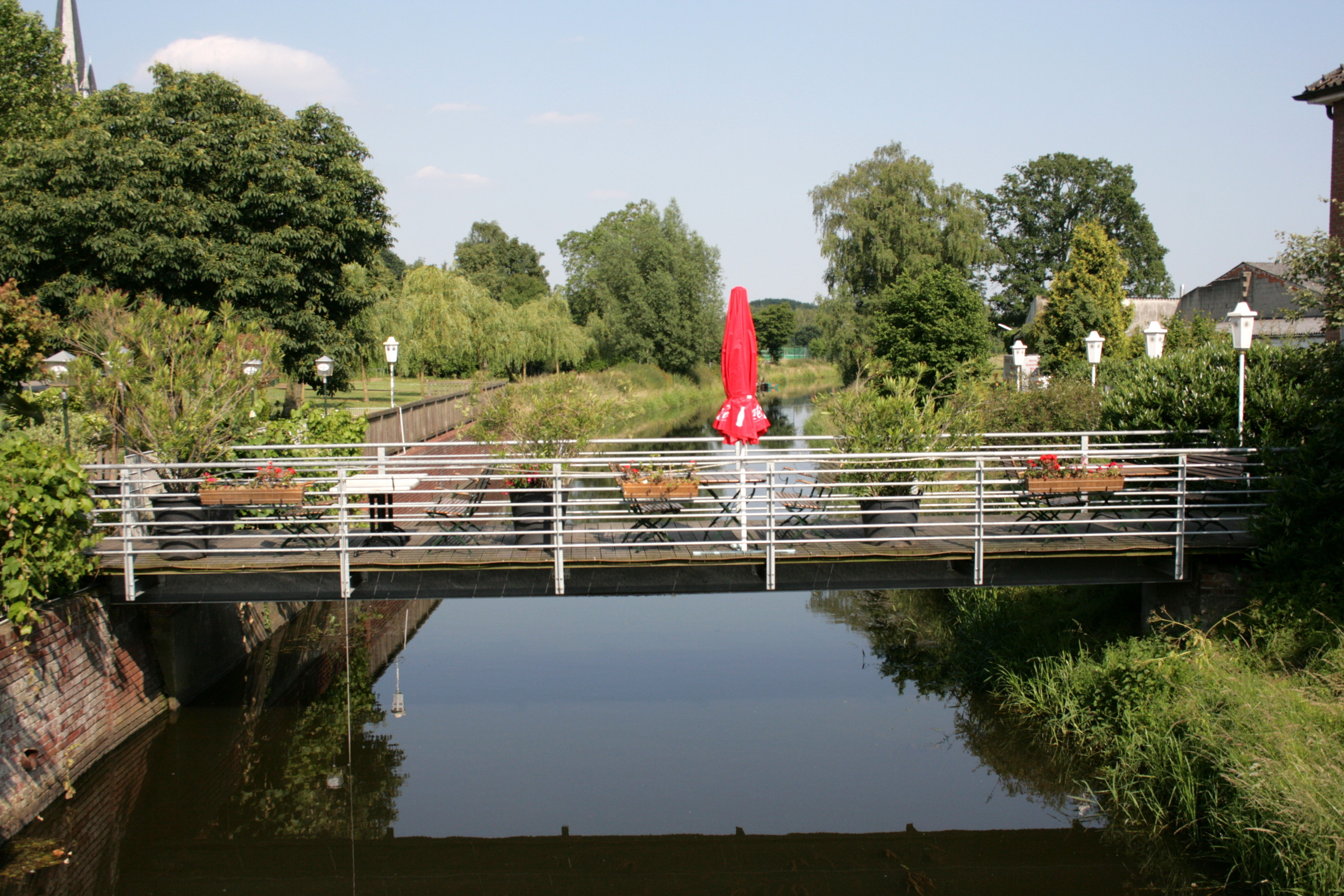
Werth, Isselburg

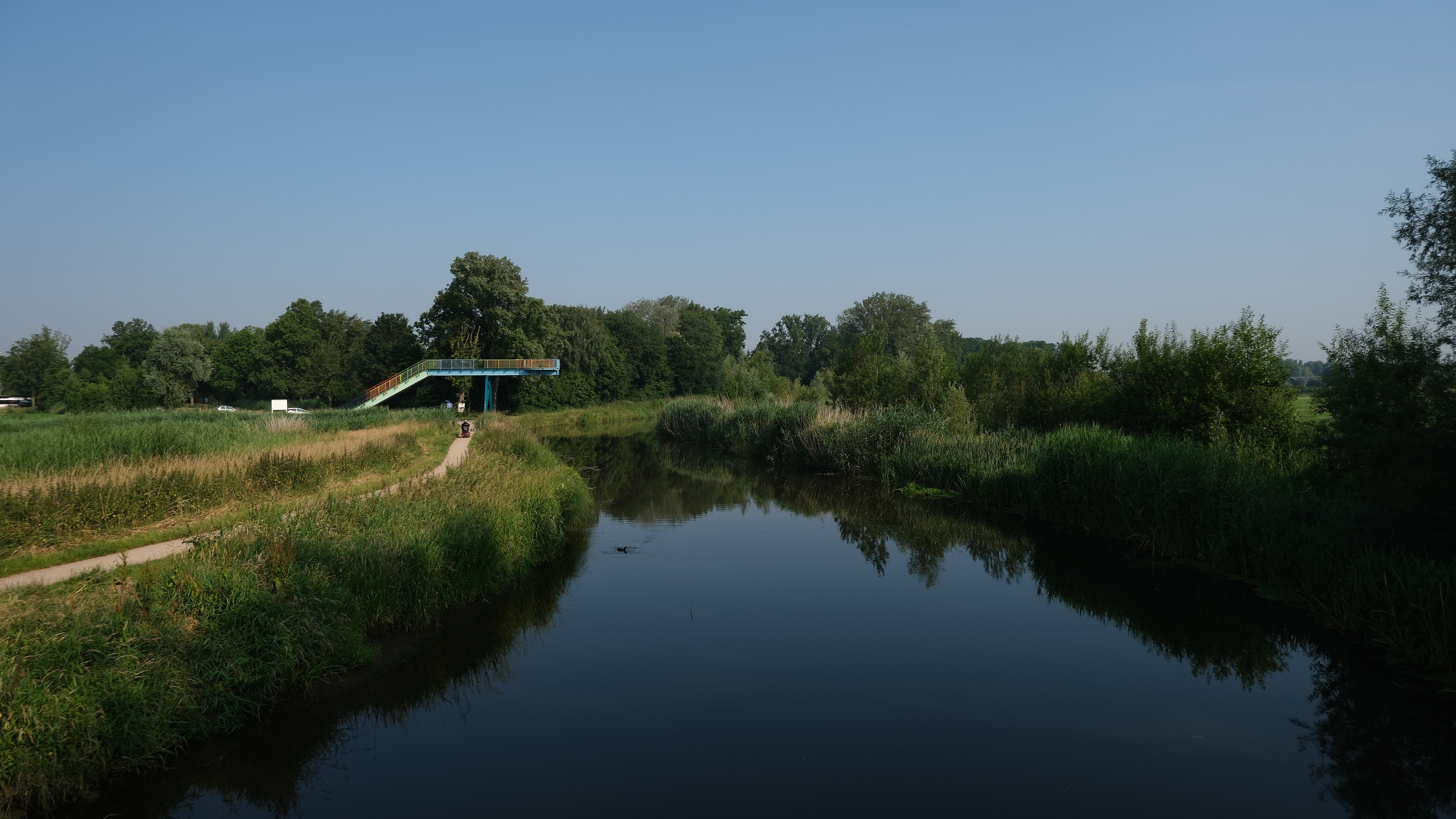
Engbergen, Oude IJsselstreek

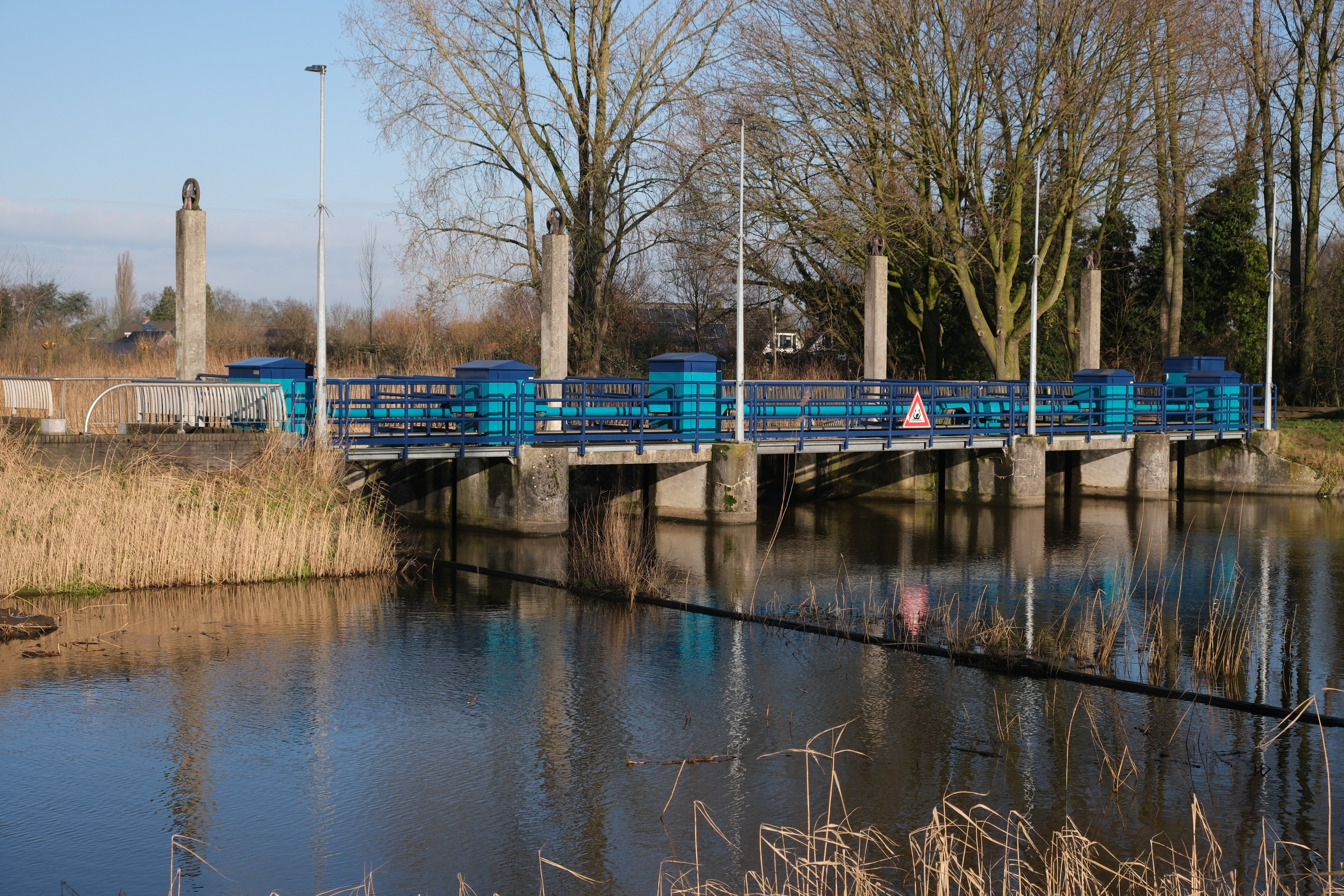
Weir in Ulft

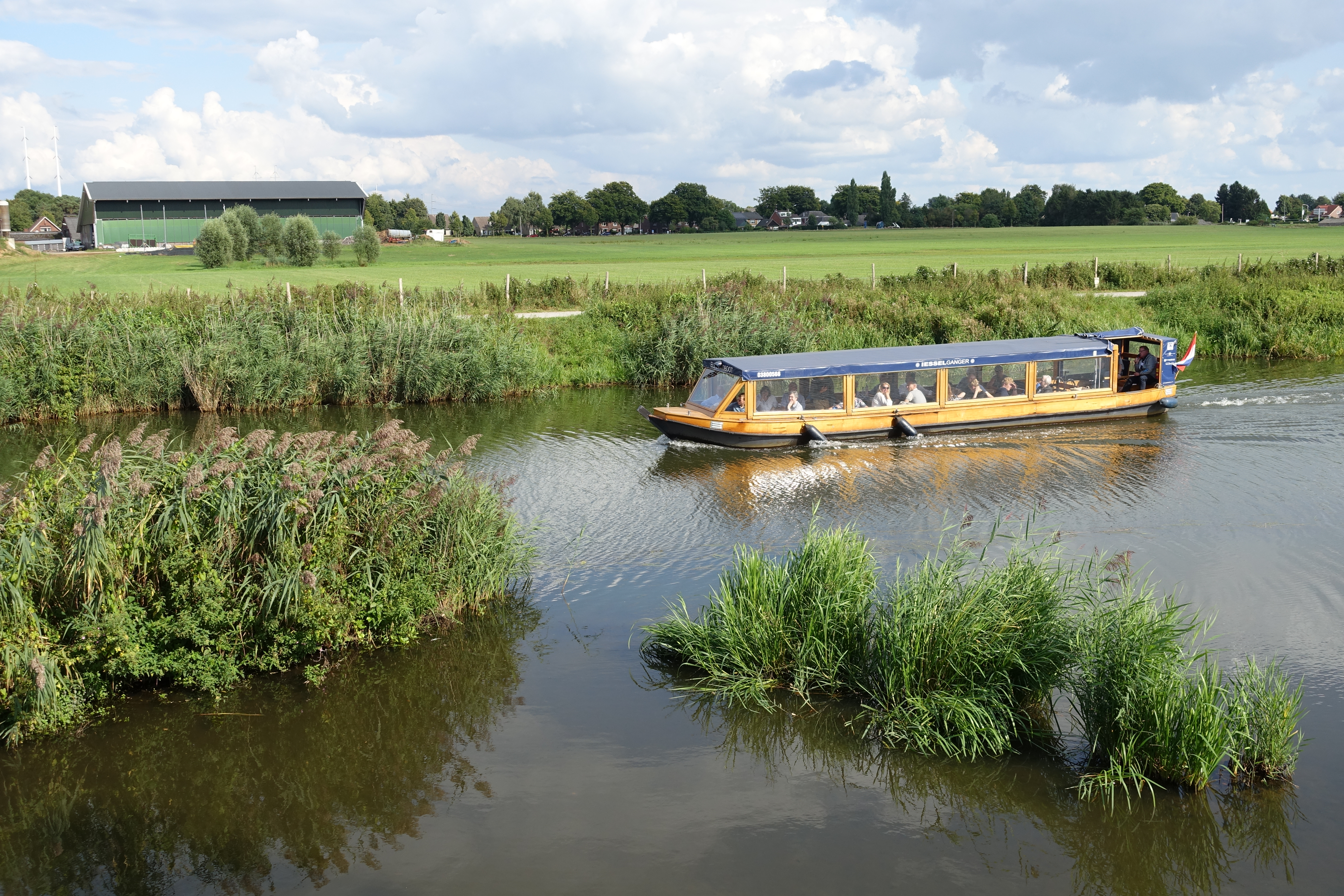
Iesselganger in Ulft

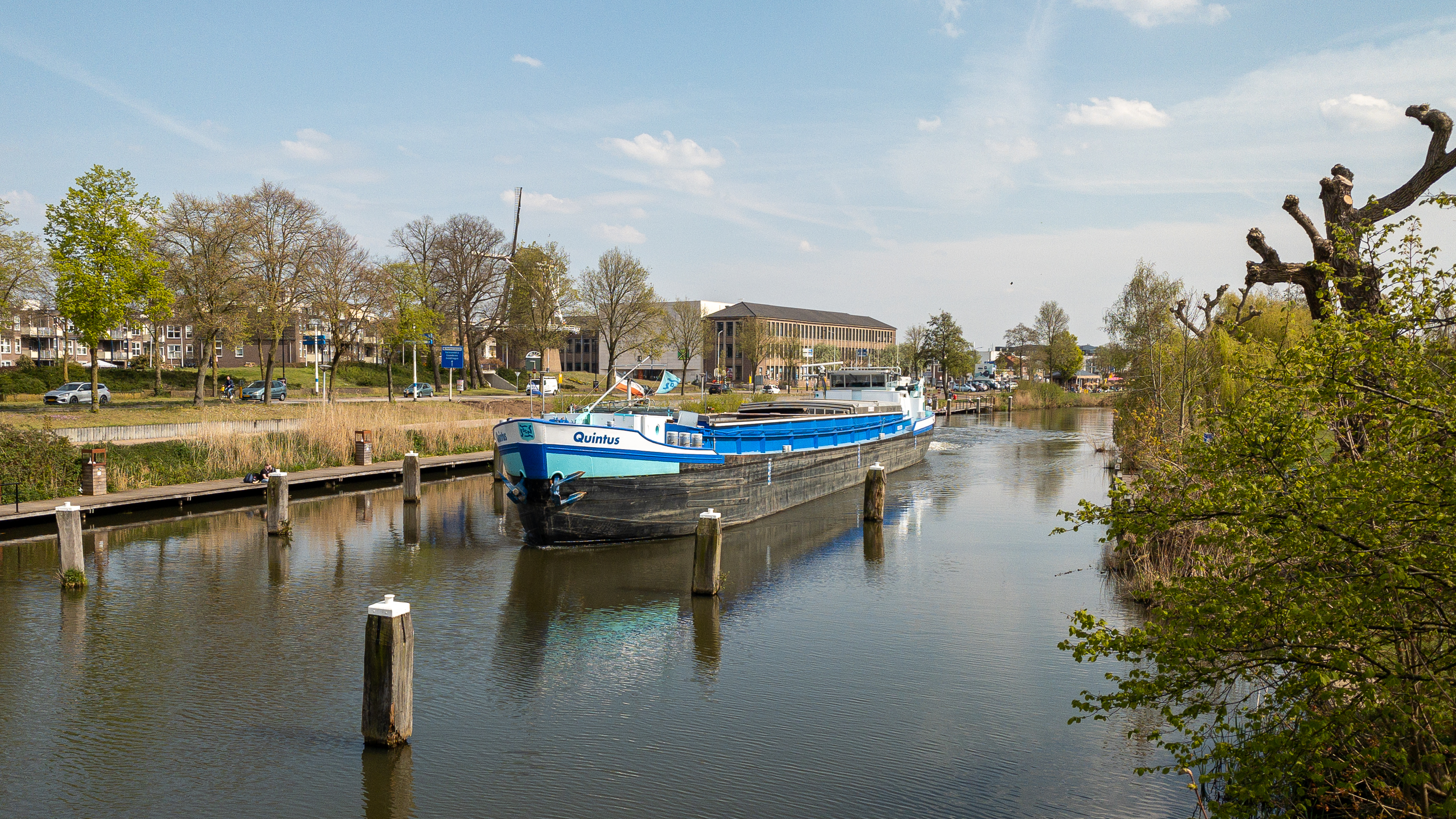
Doetinchem

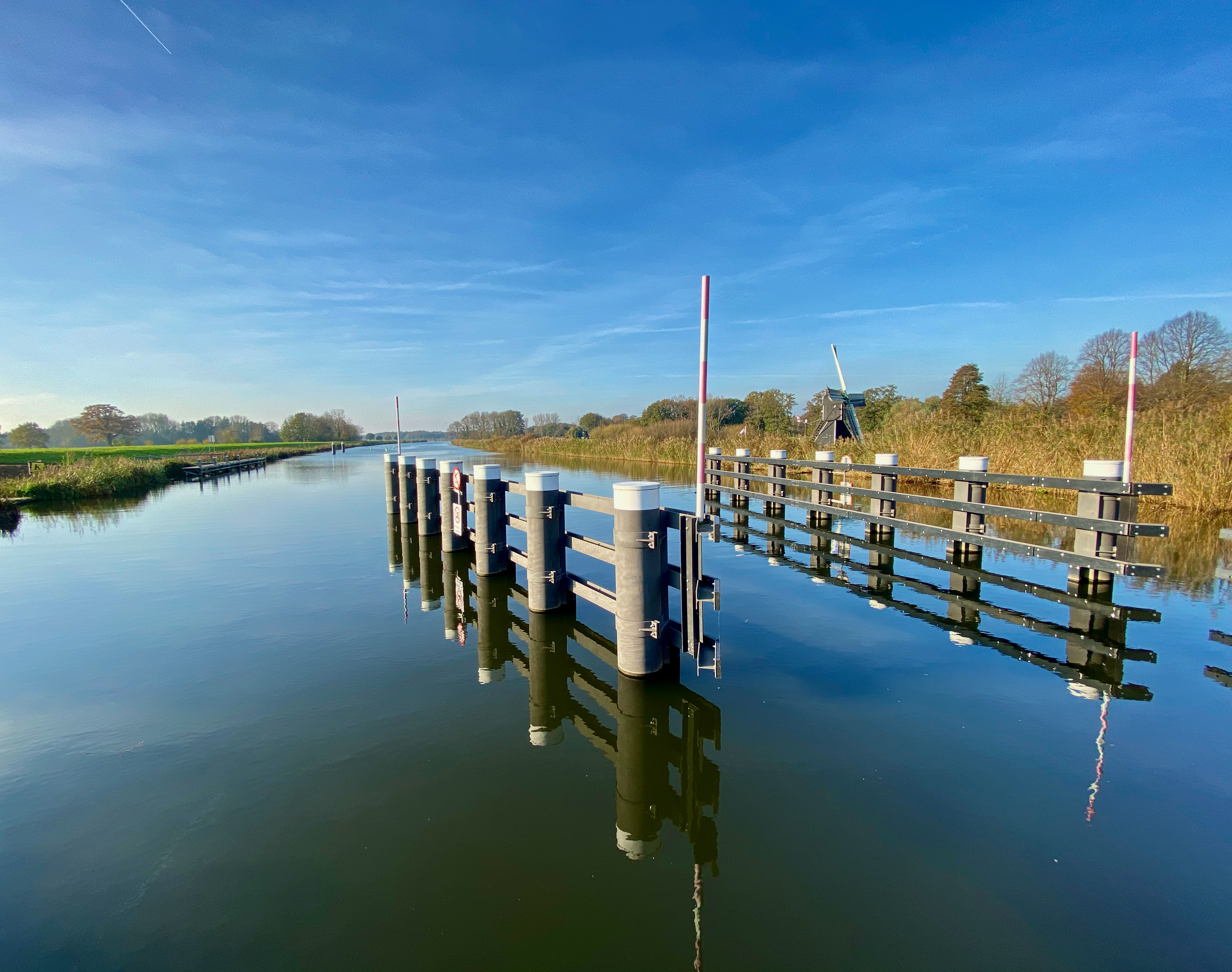
Laag-Keppel

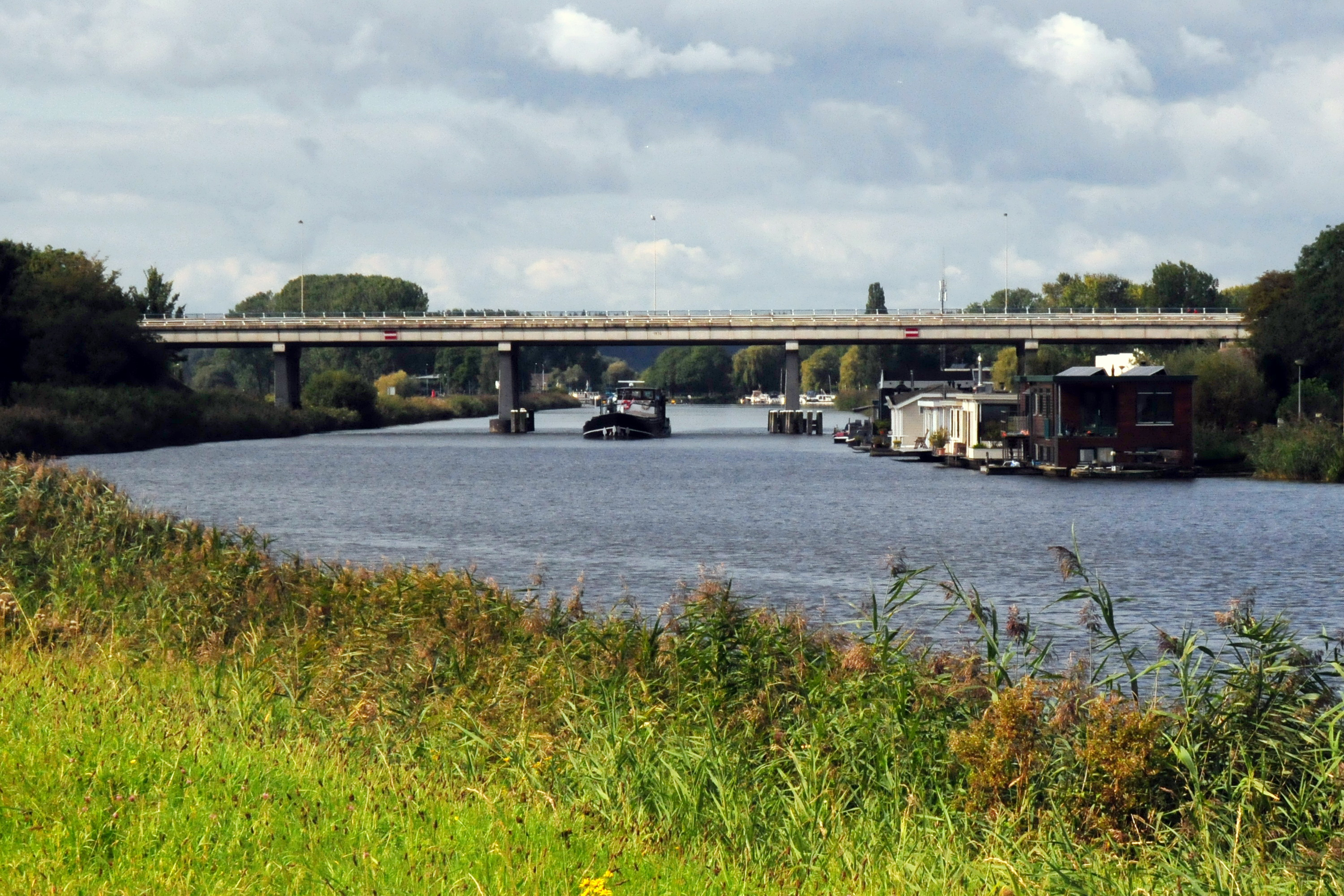
Bridge near Doesburg
