= Isselburg =

- Town
- Flag Coat of arms

- Location of Isselburg within Borken district
- Interactive map of Isselburg
- Location within Germany Location within North Rhine-Westphalia
- Coordinates: 51°49′59″N 06°28′00″E
- Country: Germany
- State: North Rhine-Westphalia
- Admin. region: Münster
- District: Borken
- Subdivisions: 6

Government
  - Mayor (2018–23): Michael Carbanje (Ind.)

Area
  - Total: 42.8 km^{2} (16.5 sq mi)
- Elevation: 17 m (56 ft)

Population (2025-12-31)
  - Total: 11,215
  - Density: 262/km^{2} (679/sq mi)
- Time zone: UTC+01:00 (CET)
  - Summer (DST): UTC+02:00 (CEST)
- Postal codes: 46419
- Dialling codes: 0 28 74
- Vehicle registration: BOR
- Website: www.isselburg.de

Isselburg (German pronunciation: [ˈɪsl̩ˌbʊʁk]; Low German: Isselbuorg) is a town in the district of Borken, in North Rhine-Westphalia, Germany. It is located on the river Issel, near the border of the Netherlands, and approximately 10 km west of Bocholt.

== Division ==
The present municipality of Isselburg was established in January 1975 by the merger of the former towns Isselburg, Anholt and Werth, and the former municipalities Heelden, Herzebocholt and Vehlingen.

== Population ==
Historical population

Year	Pop.	±% p.a.
1965	7,686	—
1970	8,358	+1.69%
1975	8,594	+0.56%
1980	9,222	+1.42%
1985	9,616	+0.84%
1990	10,084	+0.95%
1995	10,644	+1.09%

Year	Pop.	±% p.a.
2000	10,848	+0.38%
2005	11,322	+0.86%
2010	11,196	−0.22%
2015	10,736	−0.84%
2020	10,758	+0.04%
2025	11,215	+0.84%

Source: Landesdatabank Nordrhein-Westfalen

== Local council (Stadtrat) ==
Elections in May 2014:

- SPD: 9 seats (-2)
- CDU: 11 seats (+1)
- Alliance 90/The Greens: 3 seats (±0)
- FDP: 3 seats (+1)

== Mayors ==
Term of office
1999 - 2004	Margret Koch (SPD)
2004 - 2011	Adolf Radstaak (SPD)
2012 - 2017	Rudolf Geukes (SPD)
since 2018	Michael Carbanje (none)

== Church at Anholt ==
St. Pankratius at Anholt (built 1851 – 1862)

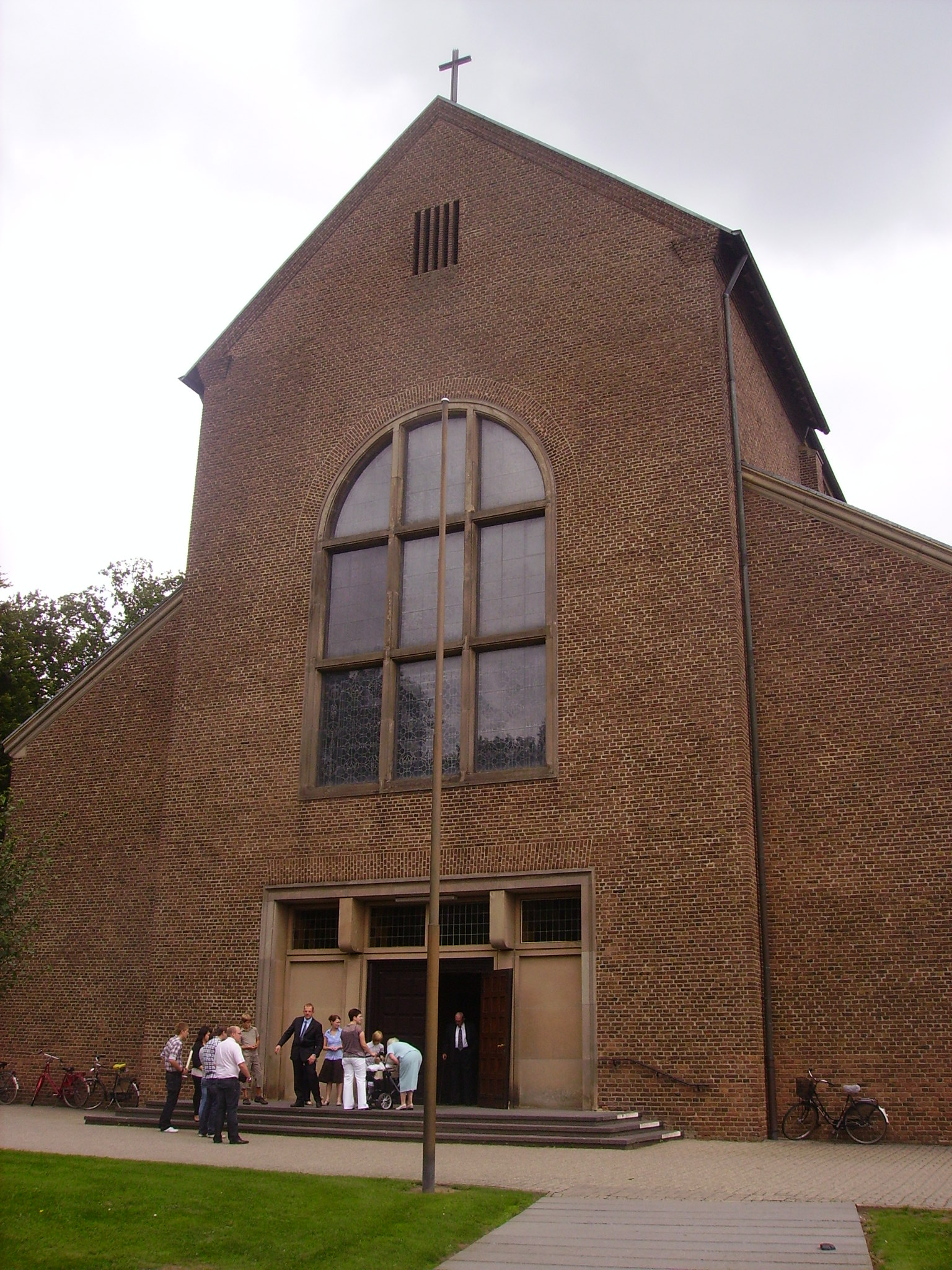
Church St. Pankratius at Anholt (Isselburg)

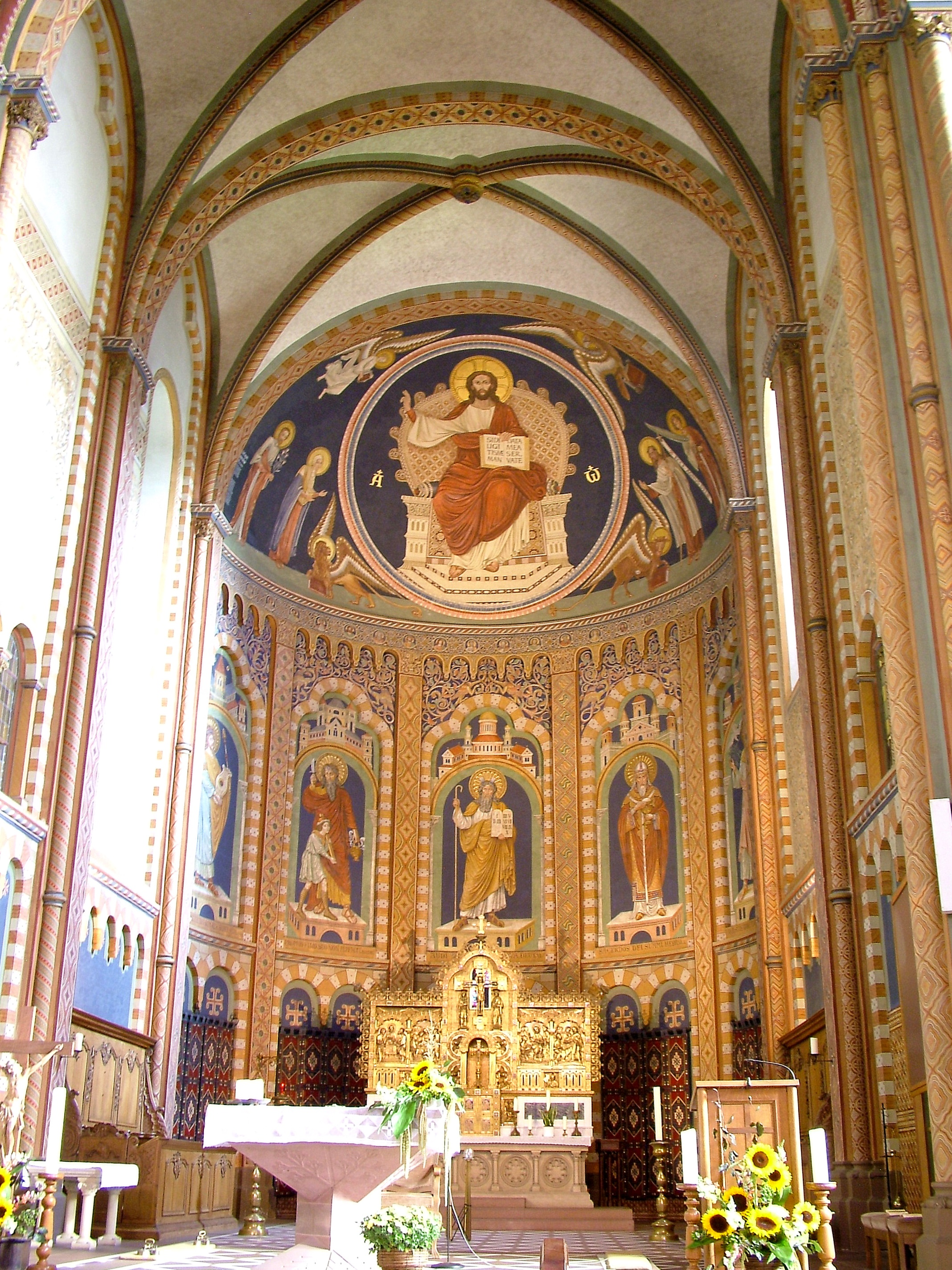
St. Pankraz in the Romanesque (revival) style

== Gallery ==
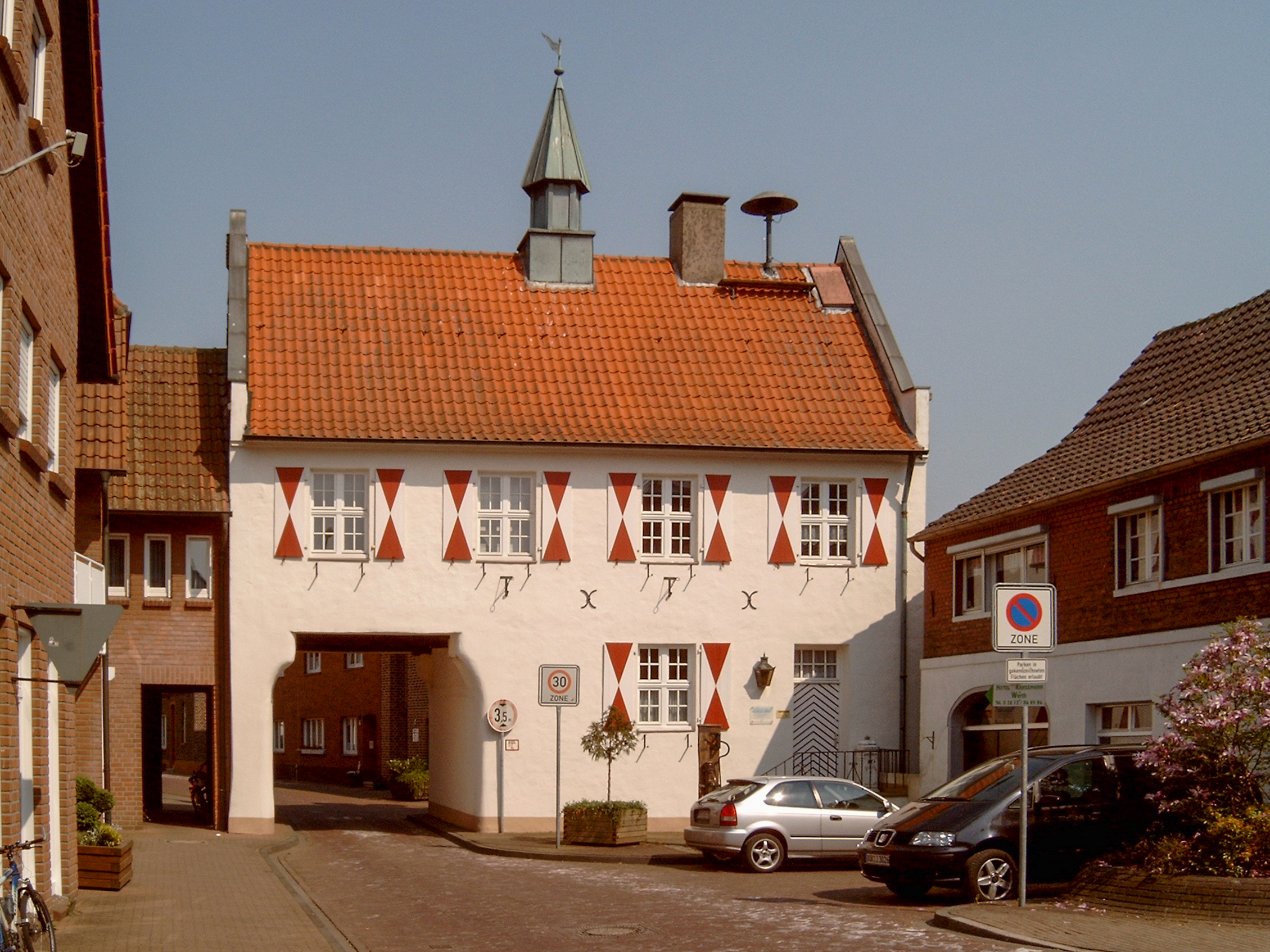
Werth, former town hall

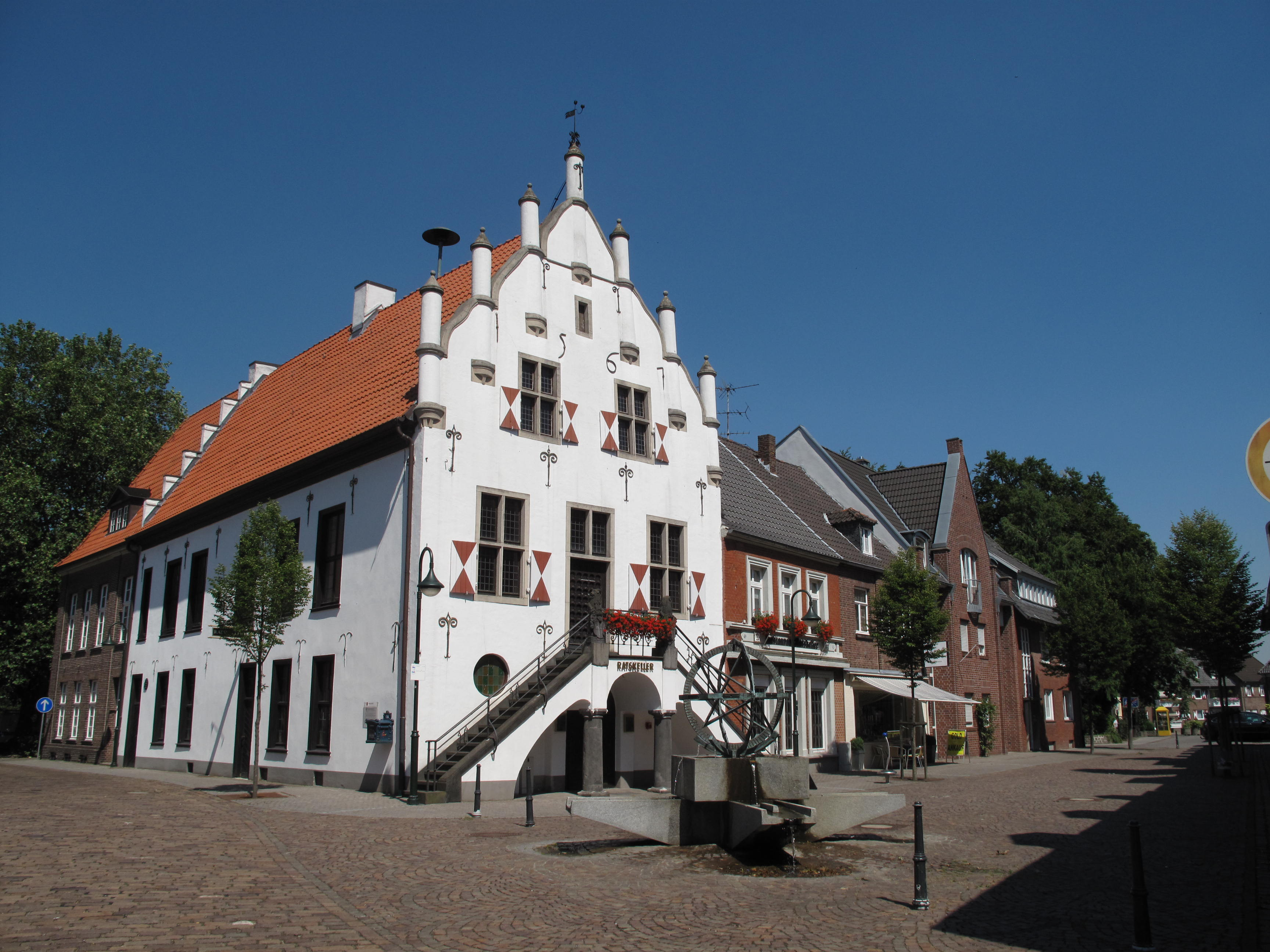
Anholt, Ratskeller, former town hall

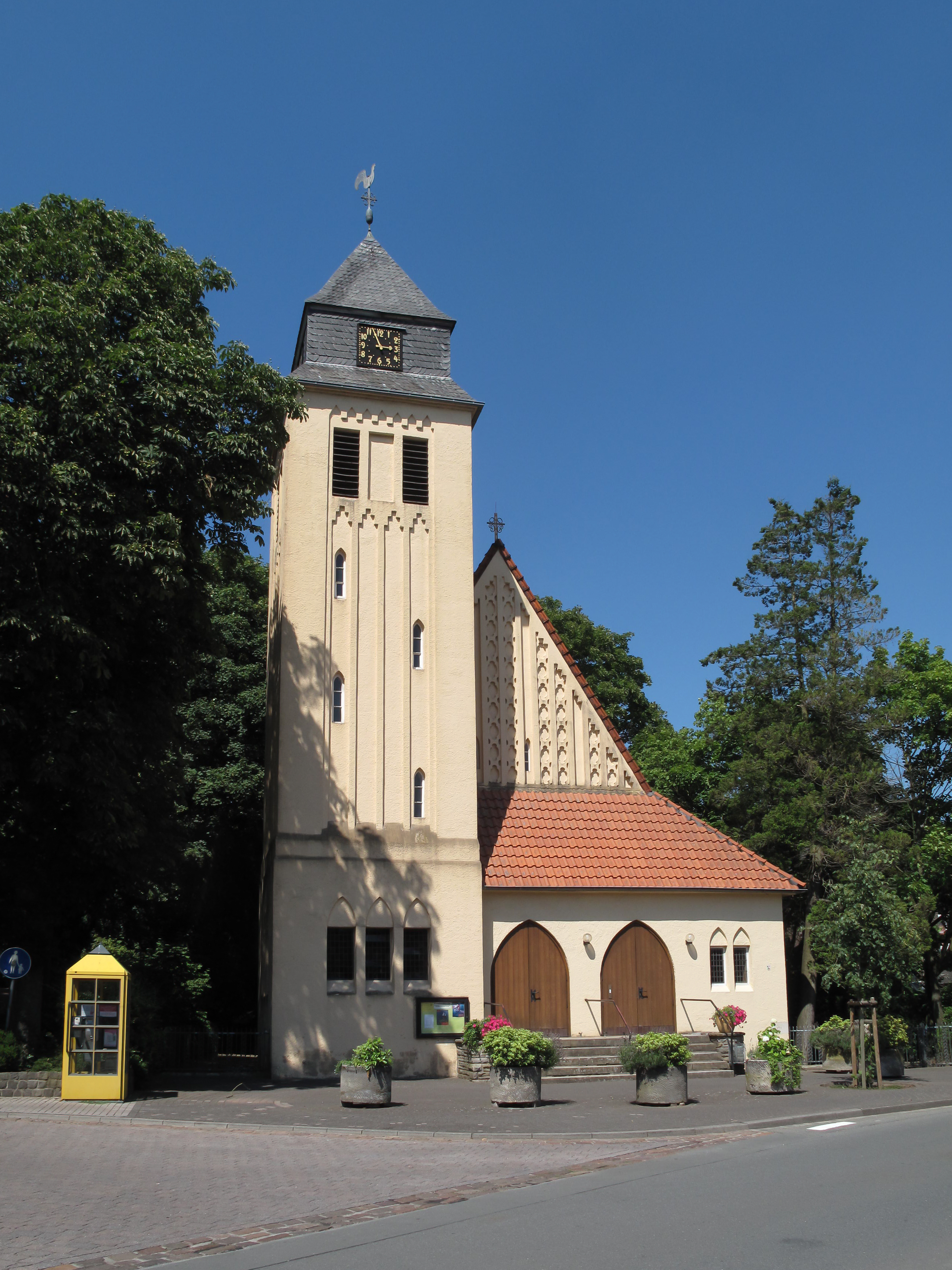
Anholt, church: Friedenskirche

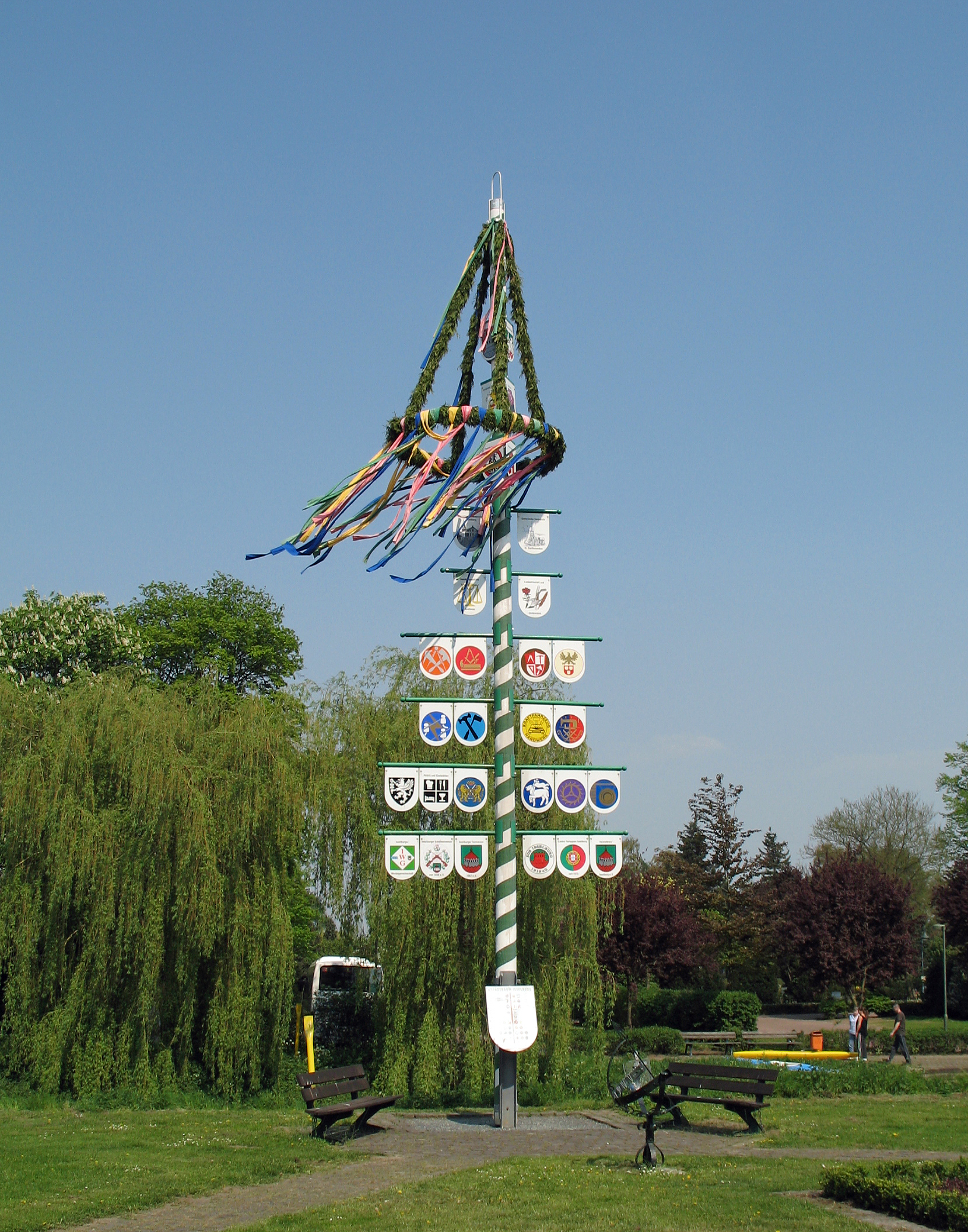
Isselburg, Ständebaum decorated as a maypole
