= Bocholter Aa =

River in Germany

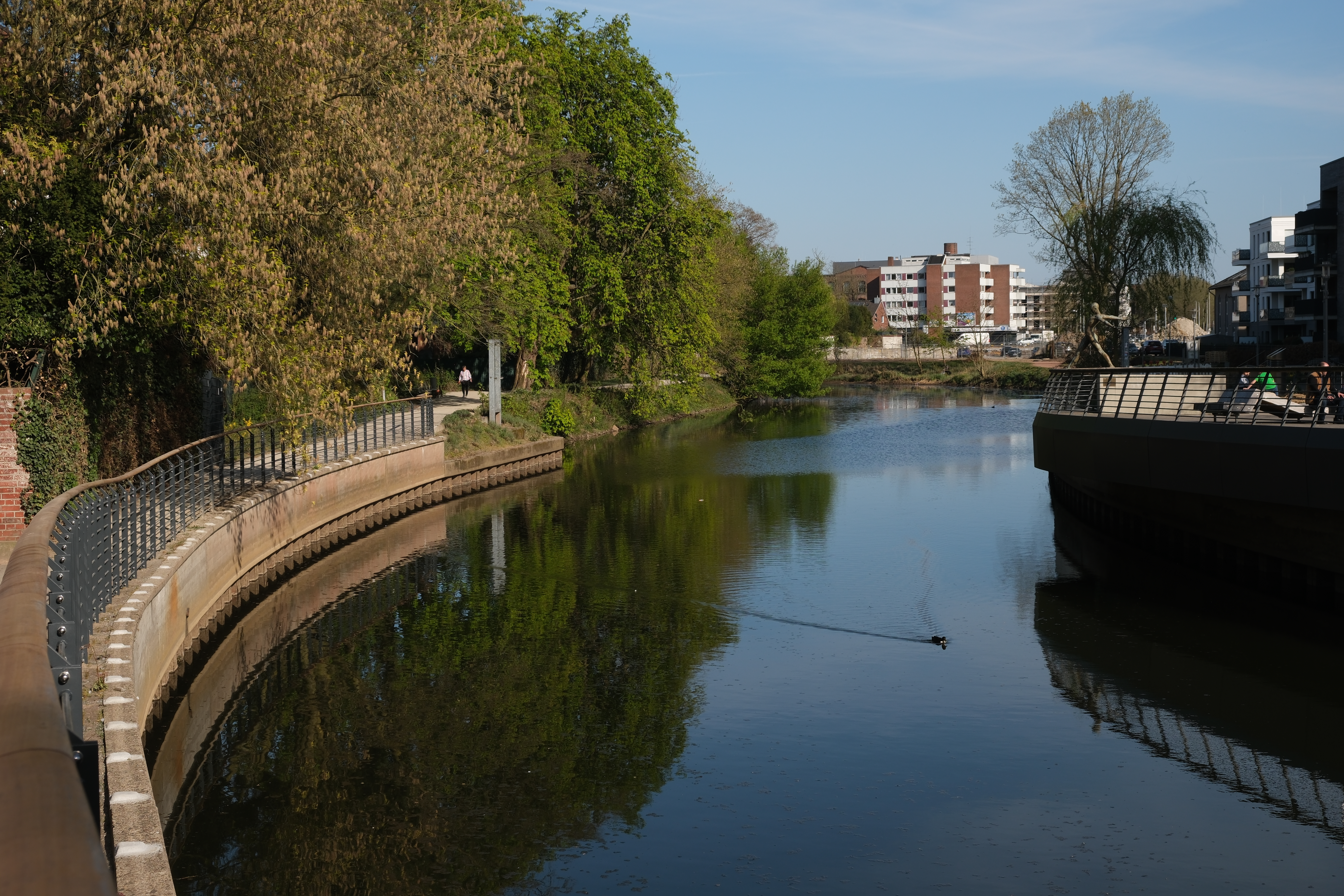

Location
- Countries: Germany and Netherlands
- State: North Rhine-Westphalia
- Province: Gelderland

Physical characteristics
- Mouth
  - location: Oude IJssel
  - coordinates: 51.8846°N 6.3881°E
- Length: 55.7 km (34.6 mi)
- Basin size: 536 km^{2} (207 sq mi)

Basin features
- Progression: Oude IJssel→ IJssel→ IJsselmeer

Bocholter Aa is a small river originating in North Rhine-Westphalia, Germany. The last part is situated in the Netherlands, where it is called Aa-strang in Dutch. In Ulft, close to the border, it joins the river Oude IJssel, which also comes from Germany (where it has the name Issel).

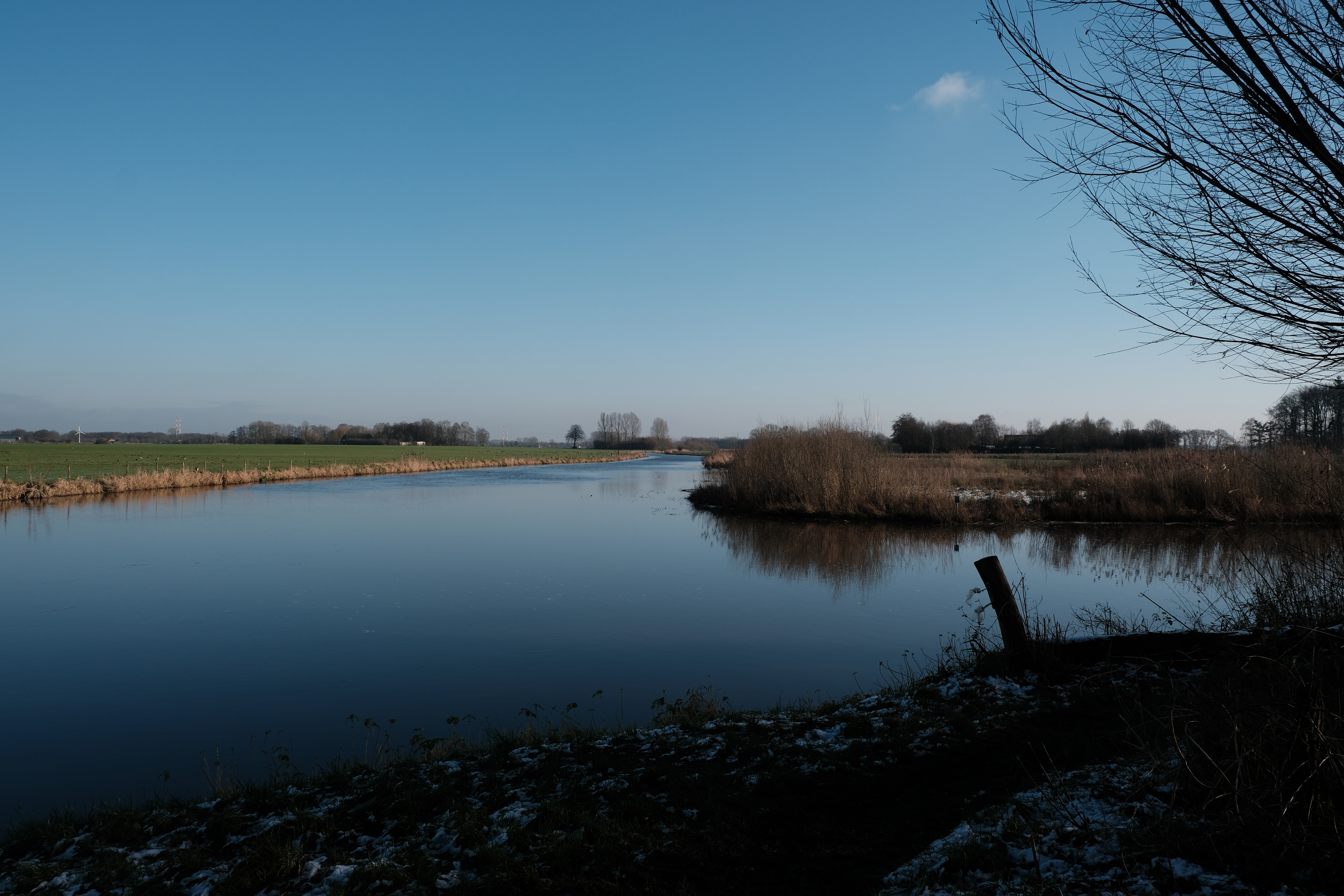
At Ulft, municipality Oude IJsselstreek, the Netherlands. Above on the image is the Aa-Strang coming from the east, from Germany. Here it joins the Oude IJssel. The Oude IJssel flows from the right (south) to the left (north).

The name Aa refers to an old word for water which is used for many rivers in Europe. This river has its roots in Velen in the Münsterland region, where three beeks converge: Thesingbach, Vennbach and Schwarzer Bach. It runs partially parallel to the river Issel, through the Western Münsterland via Borken to Bocholt. It flows through the lake Aasee and passes the Bocholt textile museum. In the center of Bocholt the New Townhall is situated on an artificial island in the river.

Flowing to the northwest, the Aa reaches the Dutch-German border where it is a border river for ca. two kilometers. After only five kilometers the Aa (here called Aa-strang) it flows into the significantly smaller Oude IJssel (Issel). The Oude IJssel continues until Doesburg, where it joins the Geldersche IJssel, and this river leads to the IJsselmeer. Finally, the water reaches the North Sea.

== See also ==
- List of rivers of North Rhine-Westphalia
