= Anholt, Germany =

Anholt
- Stadtteil of Isselburg
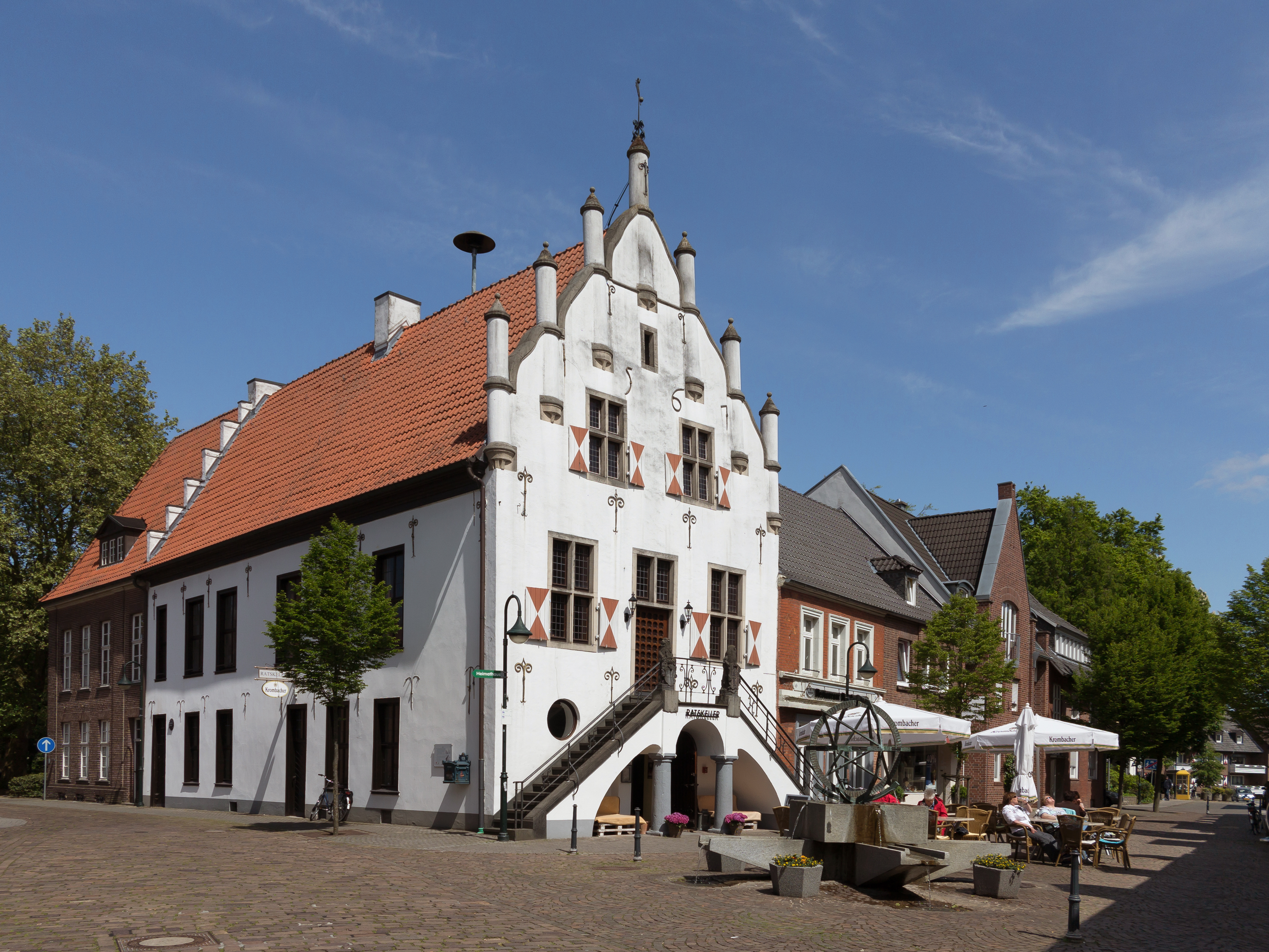
- Former town hall
- Interactive map of Anholt
- Location within Germany Location within North Rhine-Westphalia
- Coordinates: 51°50′50″N 6°25′40″E
- Country: Germany
- State: North Rhine-Westphalia
- Admin. region: Münster
- District: Borken
- Town: Isselburg

Population (2011)
  - Total: 3,360
- Time zone: UTC+01:00 (CET)
  - Summer (DST): UTC+02:00 (CEST)

Anholt is a former town in Kreis Borken in the German State of North Rhine-Westphalia. Since 1975, it is part of the municipality of Isselburg. Its population is 3,360 (2011). Anholt was the residence of the Lords of Anholt. It was the capital of the Principality of Salm-Salm; the princely Salm family (also titled Dukes of Hoogstraten) is still residing at Anholt Castle.

Anholt borders on the Netherlands to the north and west and on the Rhineland to the south. It is the westernmost town of the region of Münster, Westphalia.

Anholt Castle, of which the oldest part dates from the 12th century, was restored after World War II. It is surrounded by a moat, a baroque garden and an English-style park. One of the wings of the castle was turned into a museum, housing the art collection of the Salm family. The former town hall was built in 1567. The Roman Catholic church of St. Pancratius was built between 1851 and 1862.

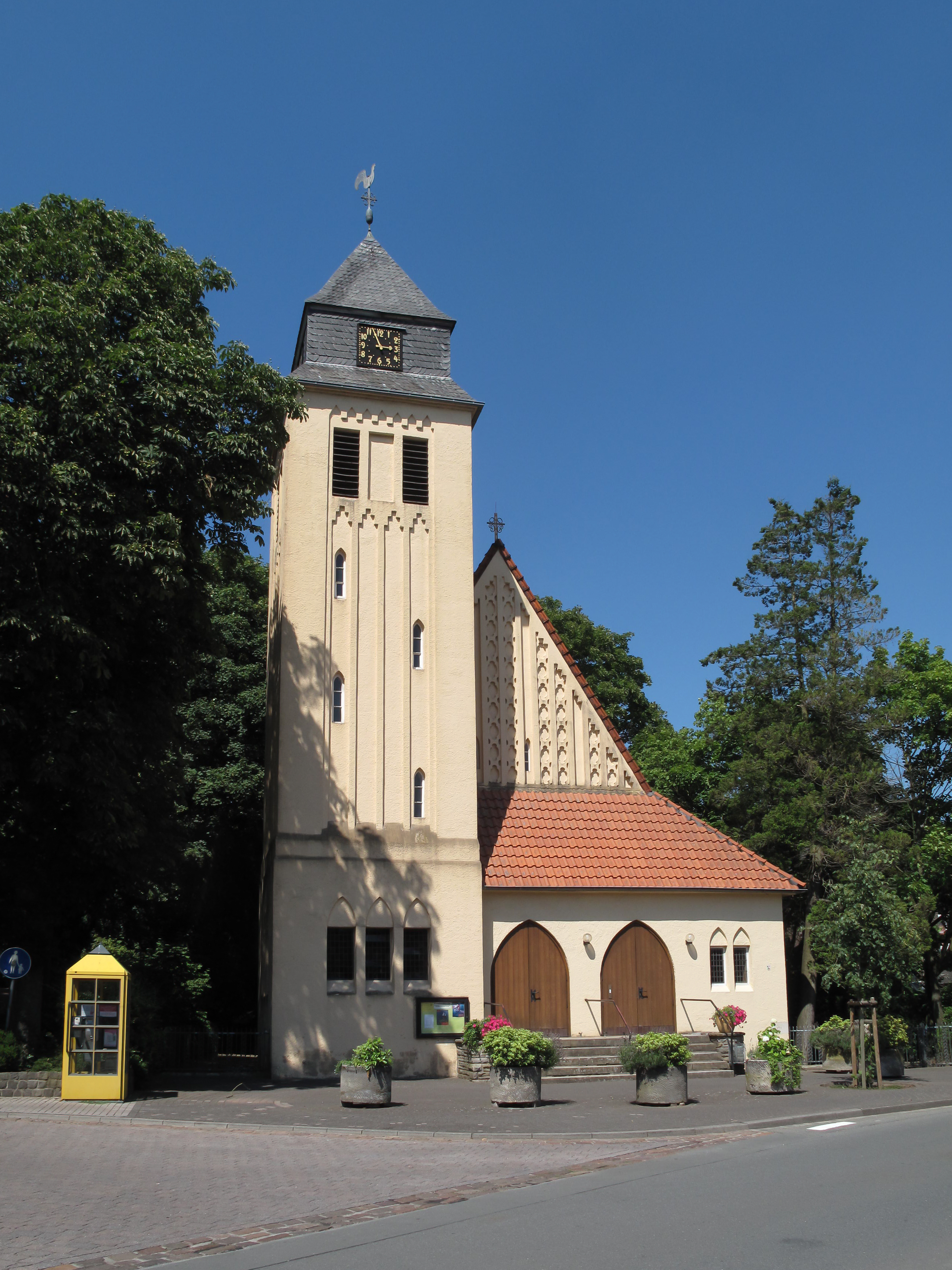
Friedenskirche

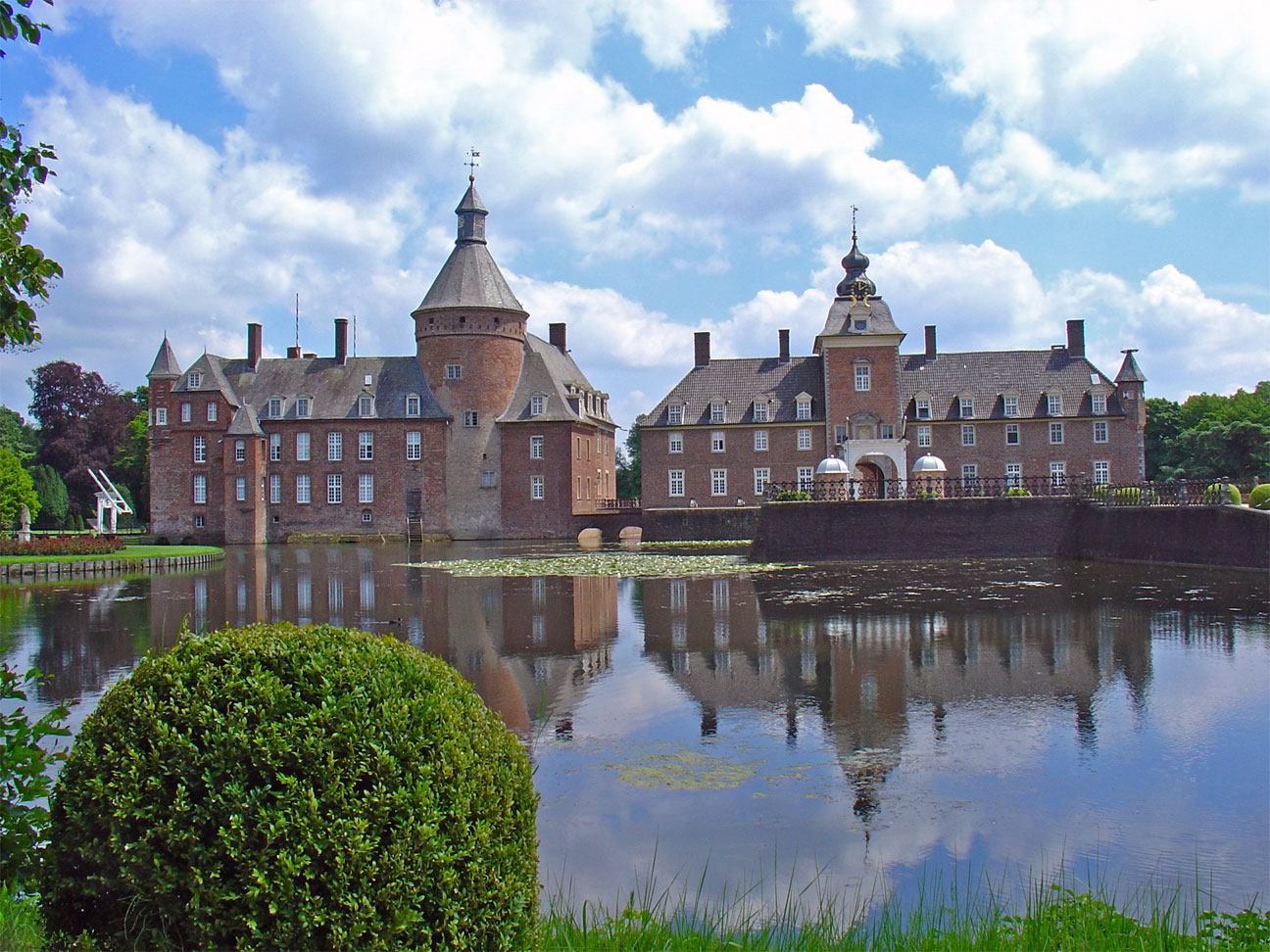
Castle

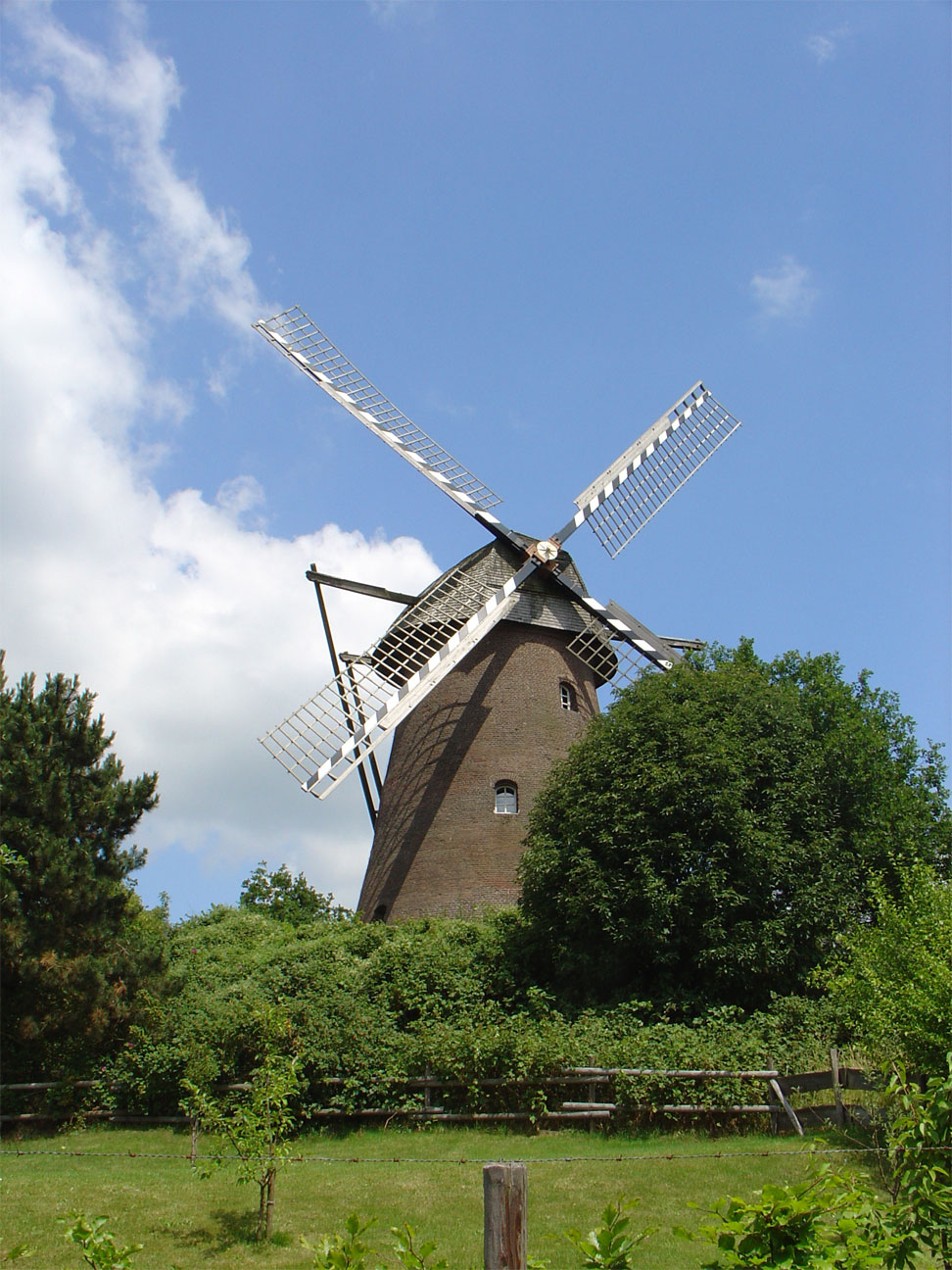
Anholter Mill

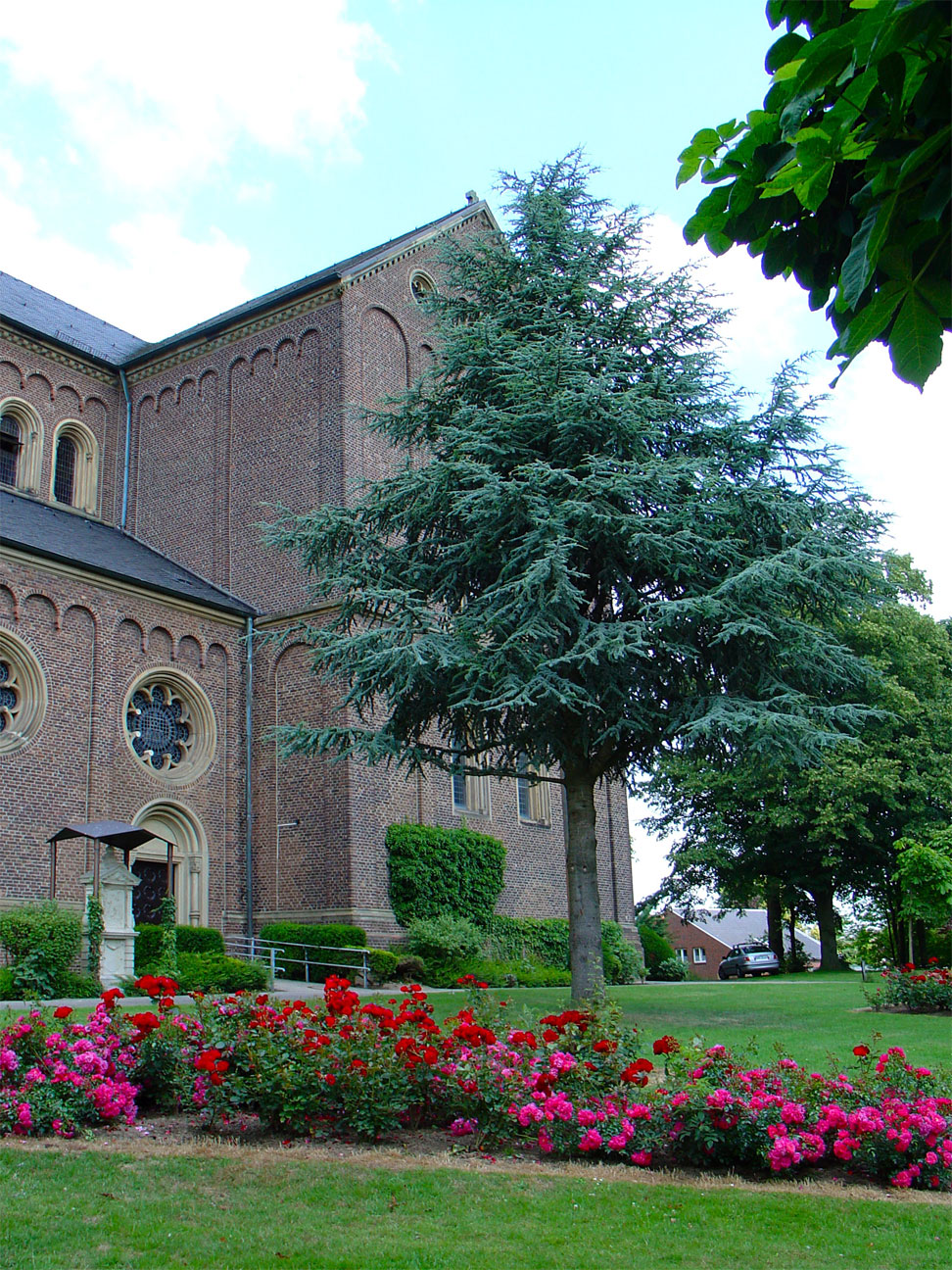
Pancratius Church

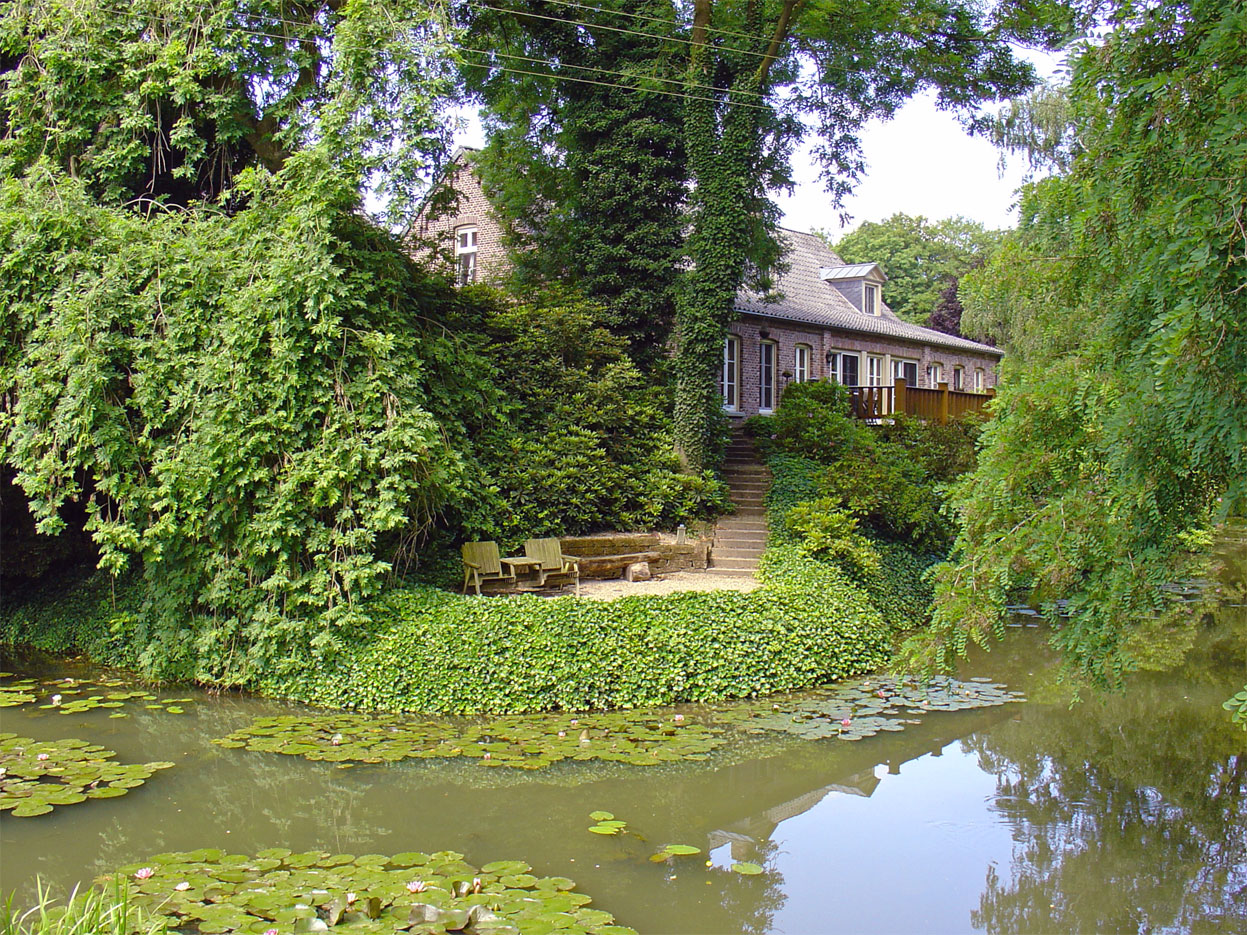
Haus Hardenberg
