= Bocholt textile museum =

Museum in Bocholt

Coordinates: 51.8355499°N 6.6239785°E

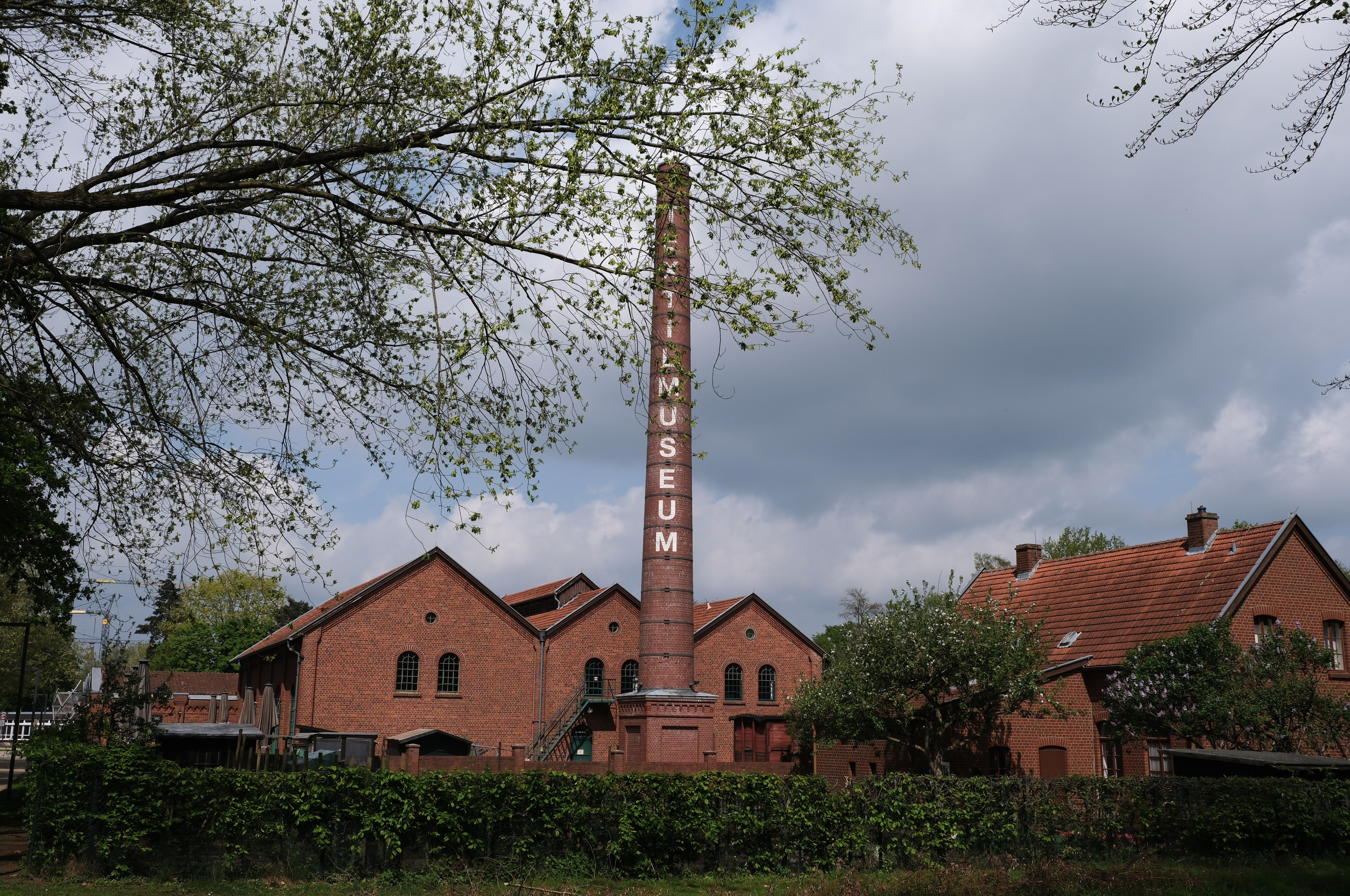
Weaving mill, viewed from the south

The LWL-Museum Textilwerk Bocholt is an industrial and textile museum in the town of Bocholt in North Rhine-Westphalia (Germany). It is one of the LWL Museums of Industrial Culture run by the Landschaftsverband Westfalen-Lippe (LWL), an association representing local authorities in Westphalia and Lippe.

The museum comprises two sites on either side of the river Bocholter Aa. Its focus is on the technical, social, economic and cultural aspects of textile production in the Münsterland region, particularly during the 19th and 20th centuries.

In 2011, the City Council adopted a policy resolution to create an "urban cultural quarter on both sides of the Bocholter Aa between the city centre and Aasee, Industriestraße and Don-Bosco-Straße". In the same year, the name "Textilwerk" was chosen for the museum’s two sites. Since the end of 2018, a 13-metre-wide bridge over the Aa, the "Podiumsbrücke", has connected the two sites. The Aa is to be further renaturalised. Some parts of the area are earmarked for housing development.

== Weaving Mill ==
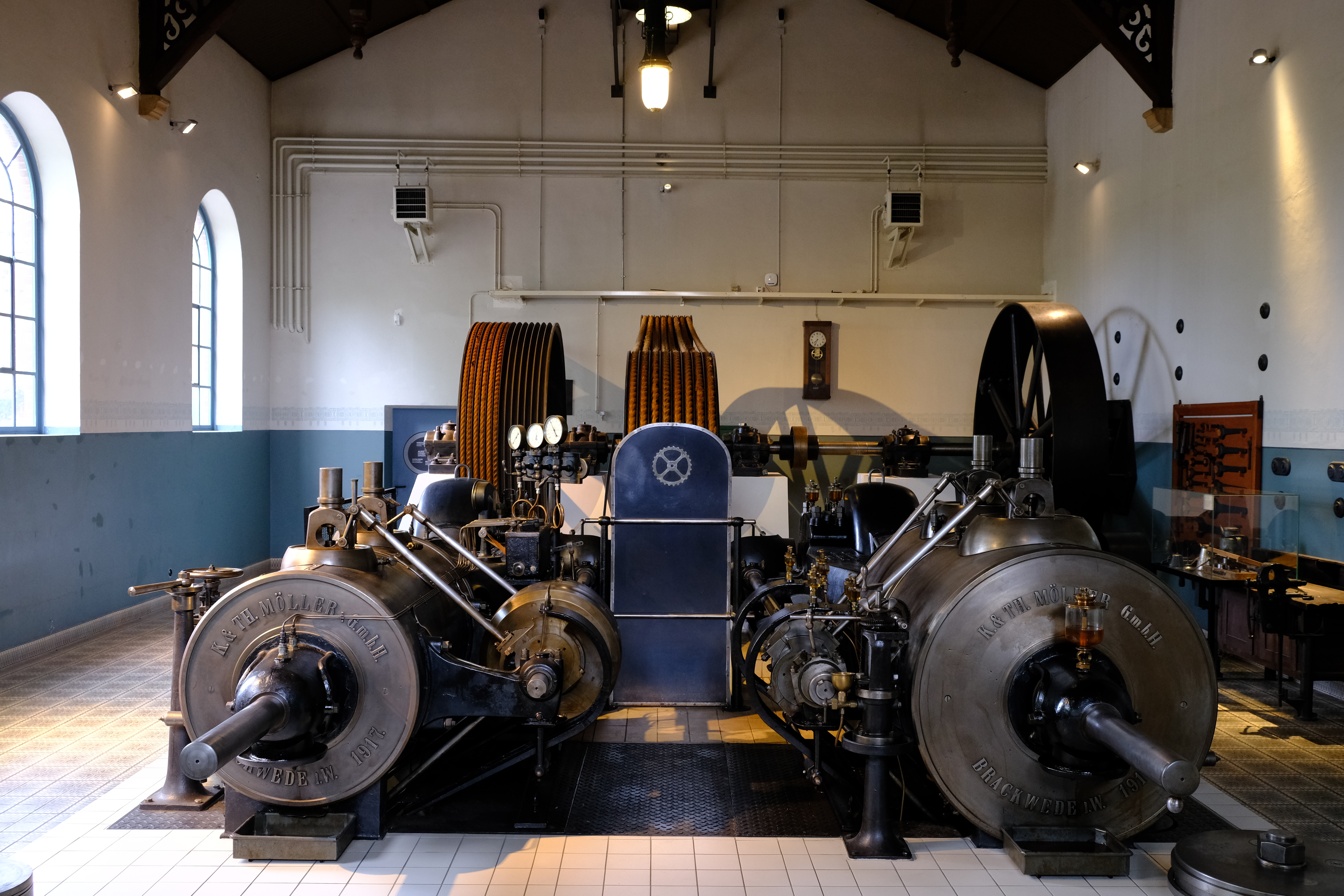
Steam engine in the weaving mill, which can be powered by electricity for demonstration purposes

In 1984, the Landschaftsverband Westfalen-Lippe decided to establish a textile museum in Bocholt. As there were no suitable existing facilities, a new building was constructed. The museum opened in 1989. It is situated in the immediate vicinity of Lake Aa, a local recreation area in the south-east of the town.

Various machines have been installed in the main building to depict a typical workshop from the period between 1900 and 1960. These include a steam engine, now powered by electricity during demonstrations, which drives transmission belts. In the weaving mill itself, with its shed roofs, there are over 30 looms of various designs spanning 100 years. Some of these are operated during demonstrations using the transmission belts, which clearly demonstrates how they work, as well as the noise they generate. Some of the household textiles on sale in the shop were produced in the weaving mill. The main building also houses a typical break room and an office. In 2018, the permanent exhibition in the weaving mill was revamped.

The site also includes other buildings. Directly adjacent to the weaving mill’s main building is the ‘Schiffchen’, a restaurant. Next to this are a gatehouse, workers’ cottages and sheds. One of the houses can be viewed from the inside; the site also includes workers’ allotments (self-sufficiency gardens with small livestock). A carriage house and a railway track with a locomotive and turntable can also be seen. In future, there are plans for a further building dedicated to museum education.

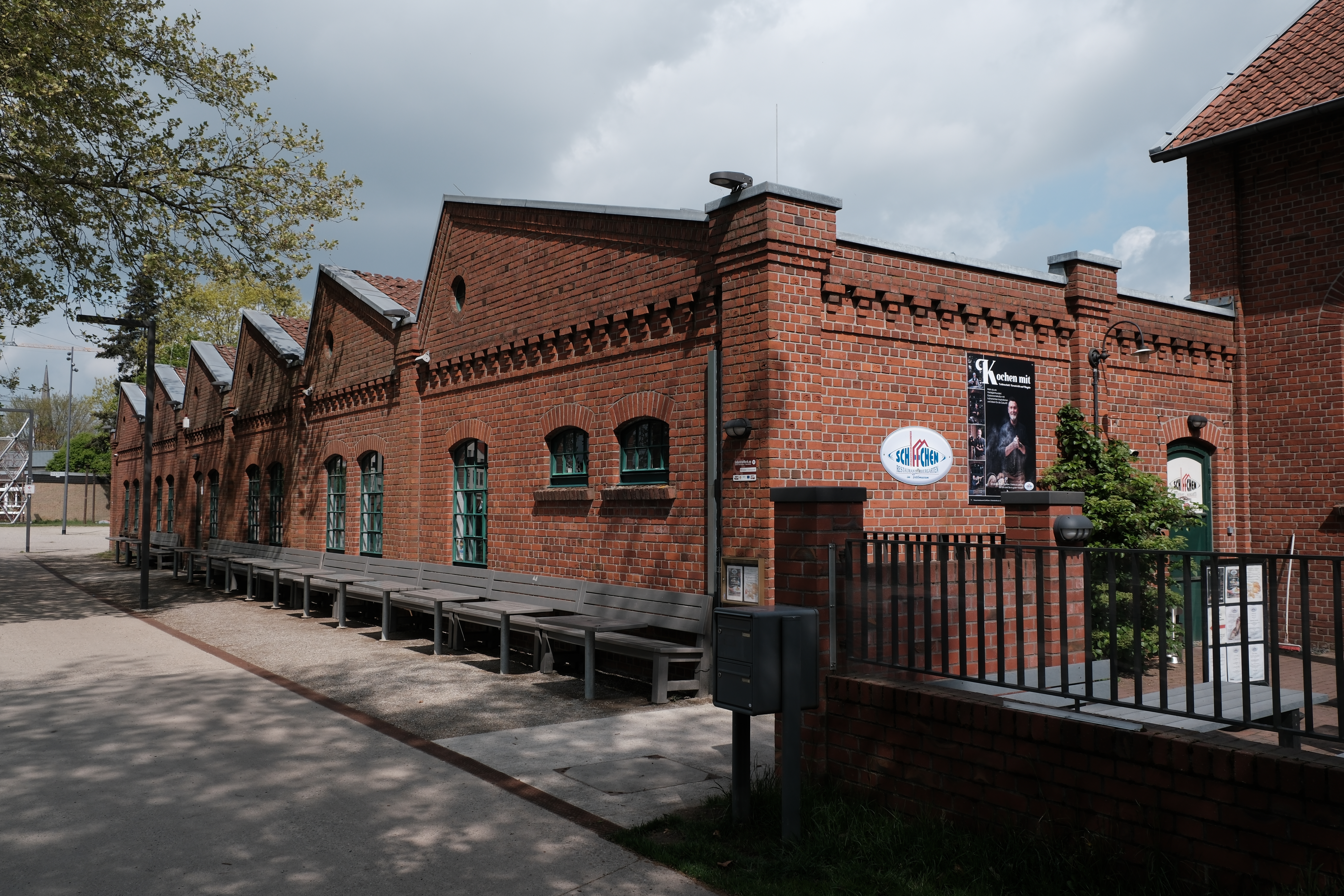
West side with restaurant

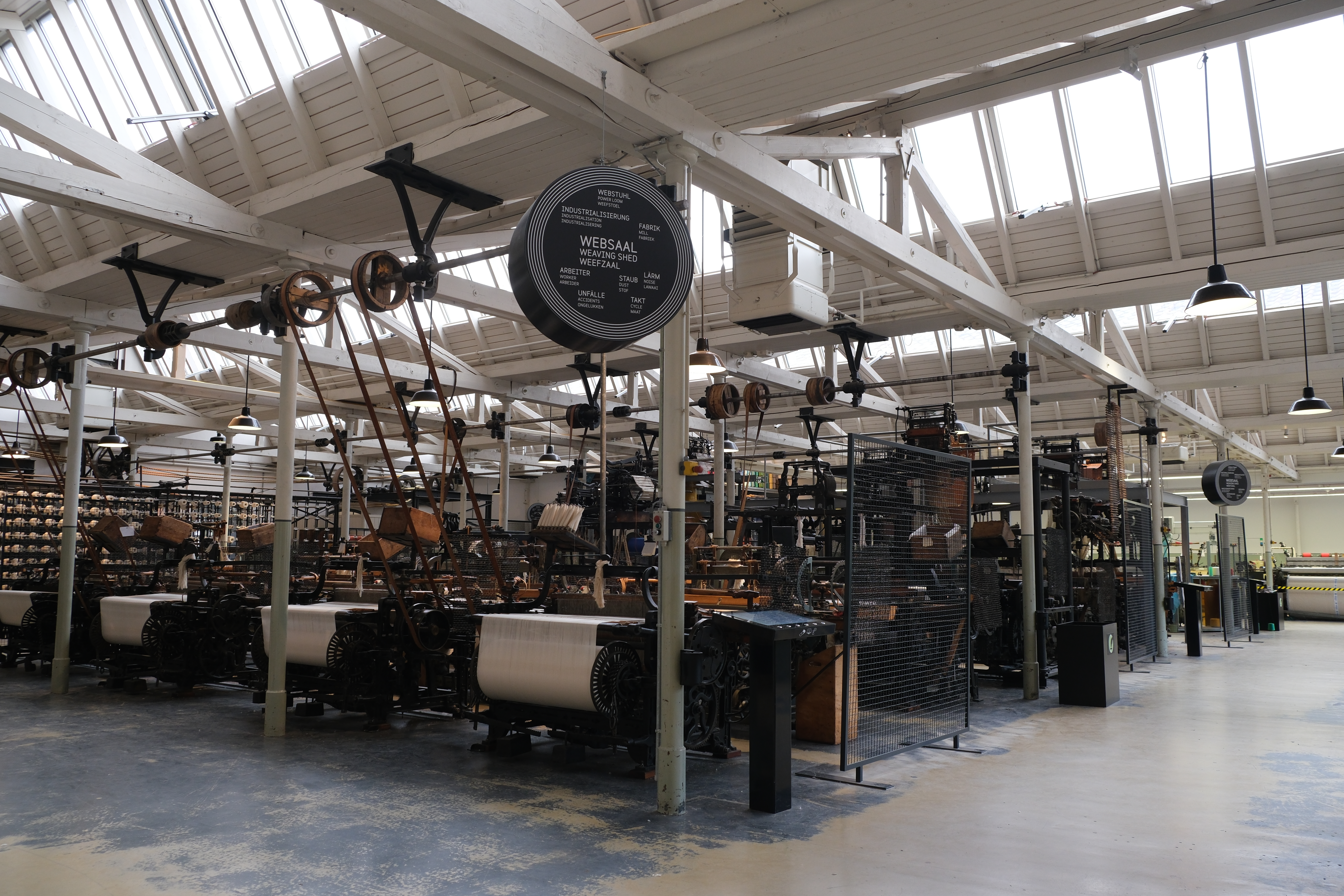
Looms

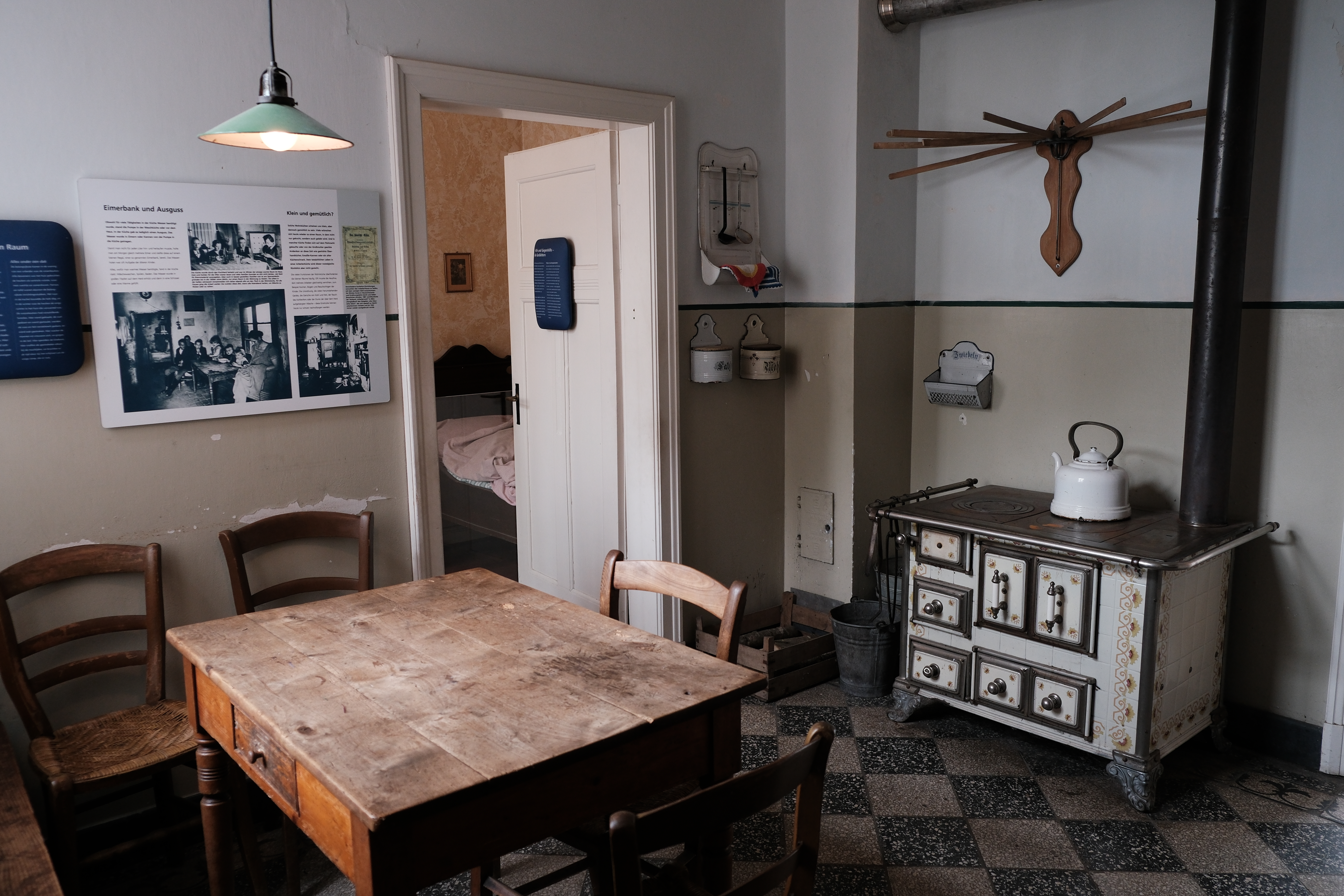
Kitchen in workers’ flat

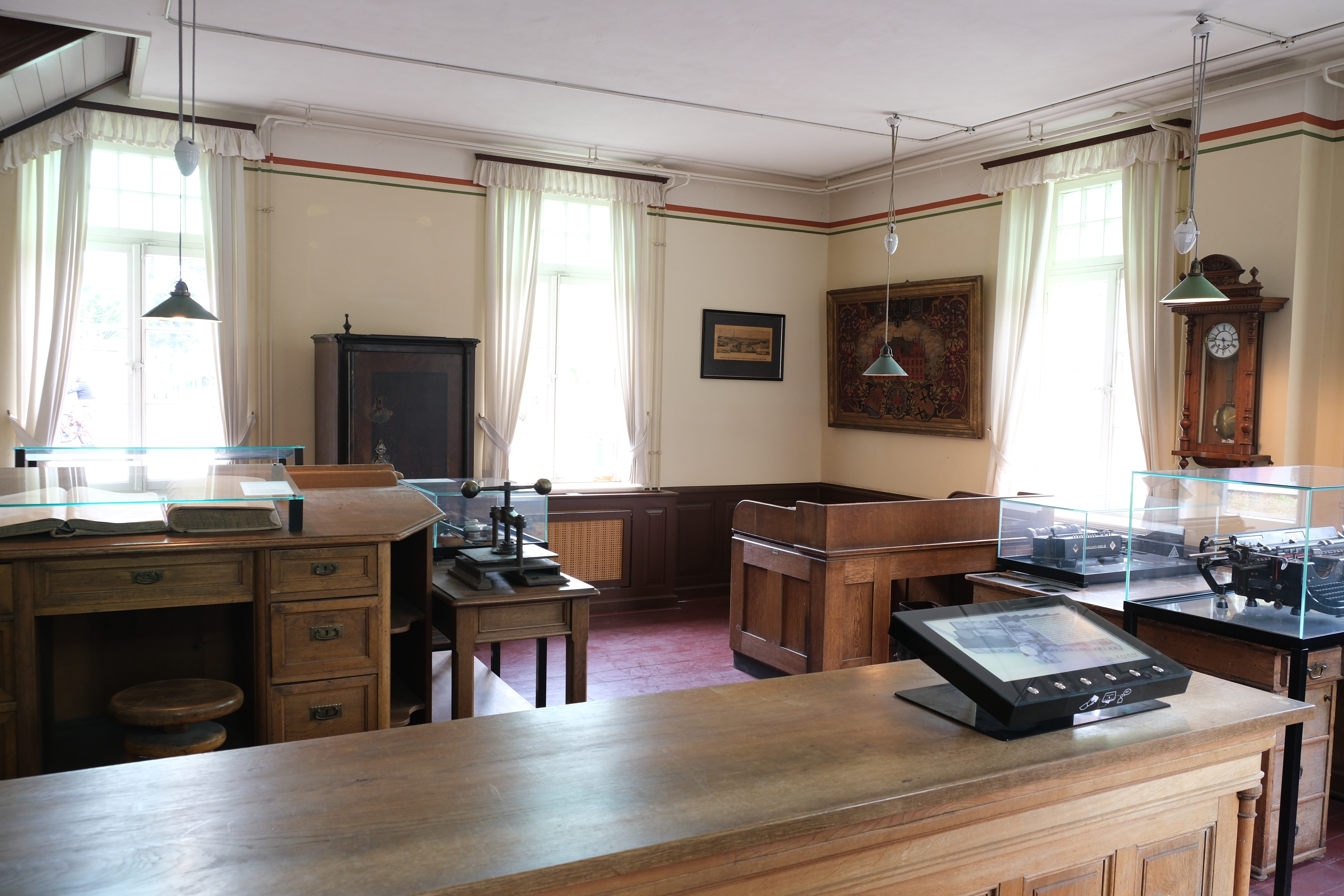
Old office equipment

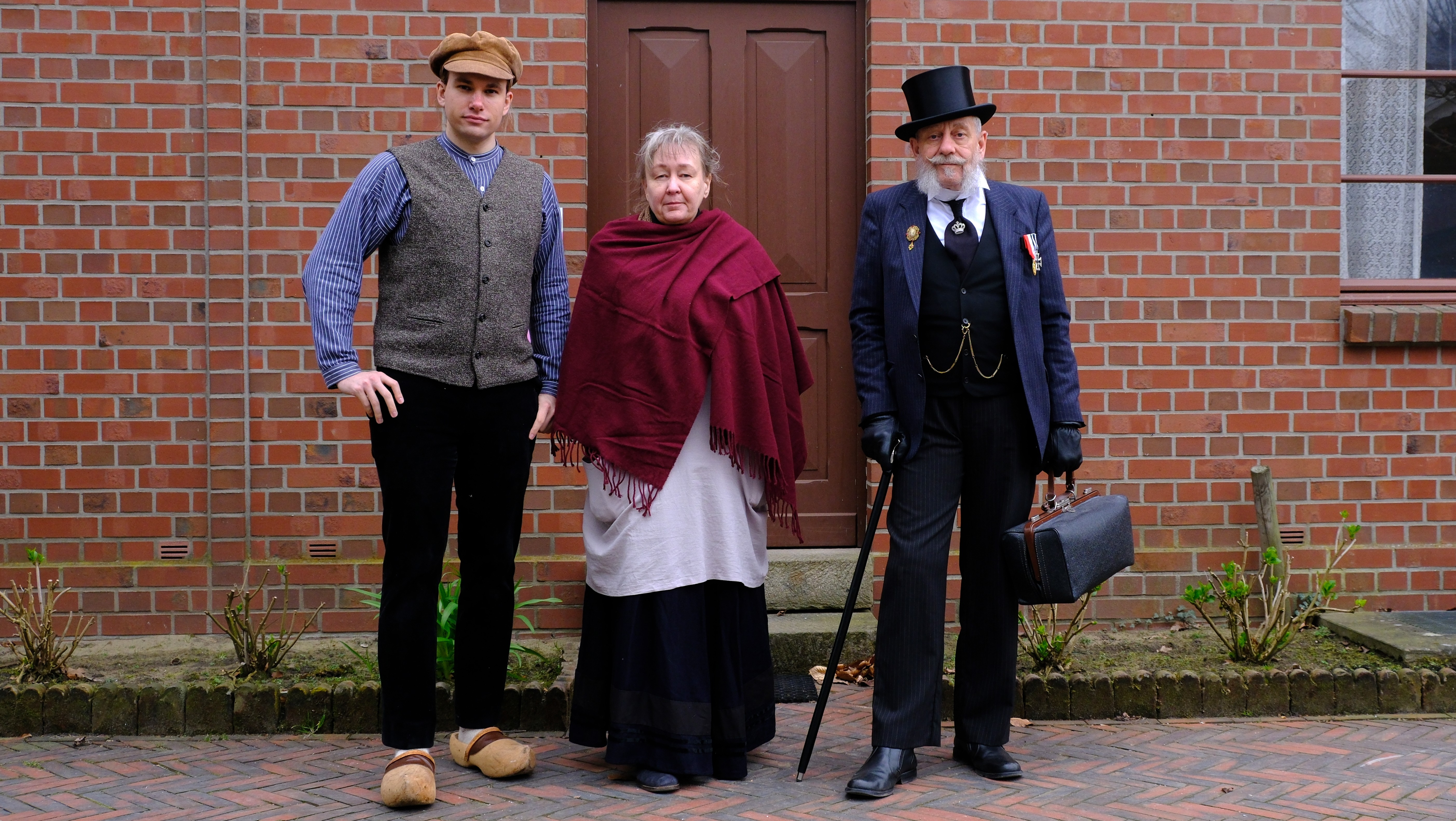
Actors in a dramatised tour

== Spinning Mill ==
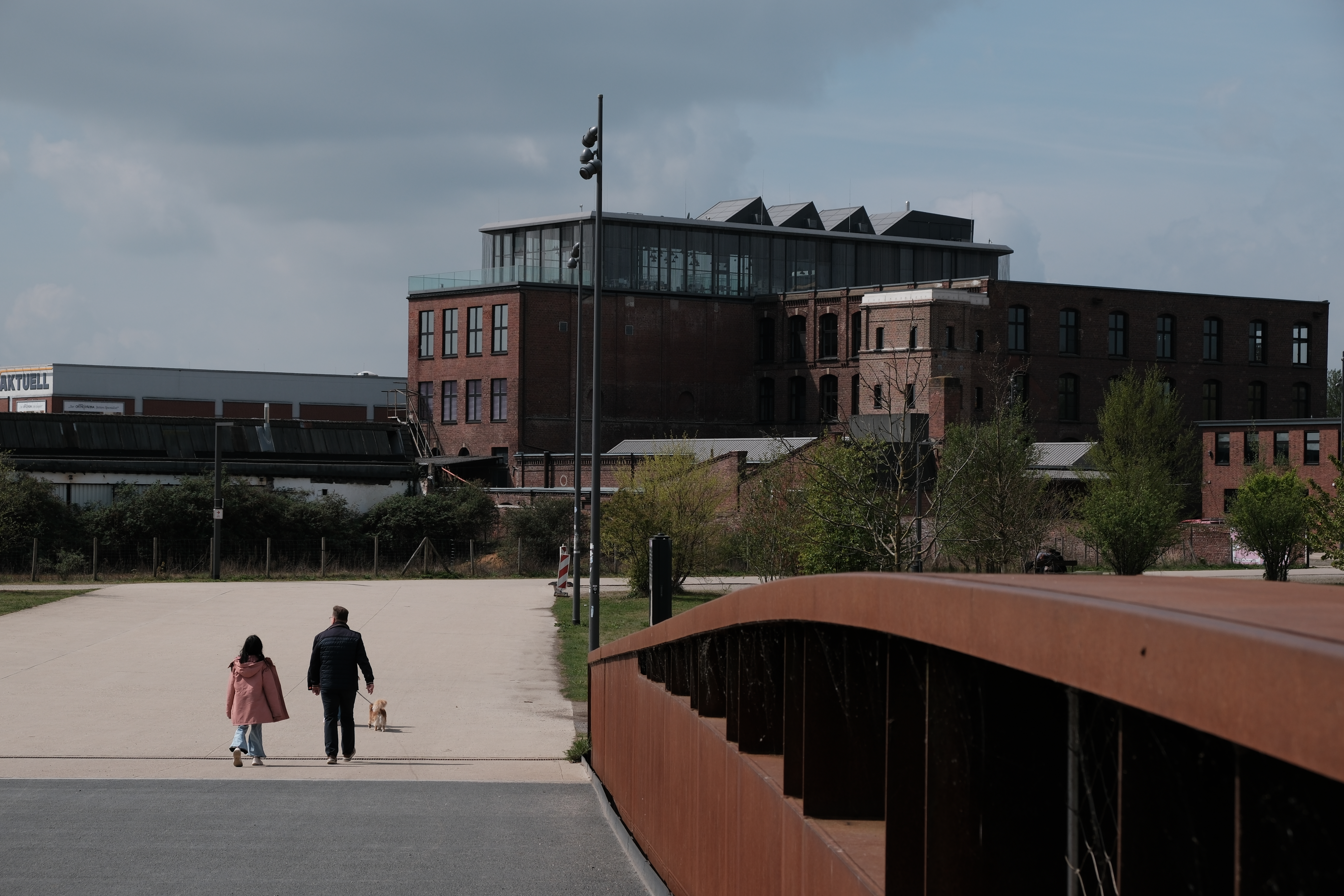
Rear view of the spinning mill, seen from the podium bridge

In 2004, the Regional Association of Westphalia-Lippe acquired the four-storey brick building of the Herding Spinning Mill as the second part of its textile museum. Renovation work began in 2009 with funding from the second economic stimulus package. Since the opening of the Spinnerei in September 2011, the Textile Museum, with its two sites, has operated under the name ‘TextilWerk Bocholt’. In October 2016, the new exhibition area "Die Macher und die Spinnerei" opened. Across two floors, the LWL Industrial Museum presents the history and work of textile entrepreneurs in Westphalia.

The range of exhibits spans from fountain pens and furniture to paintings, fashion from various decades and working machinery. On the ground floor of the Spinnerei is a "Parcours de la Mode": In a 23-metre-long display case designed as a catwalk, historical garments and shoes, as well as textile sample books, take visitors on a colourful journey through more than 100 years of fashion trends.

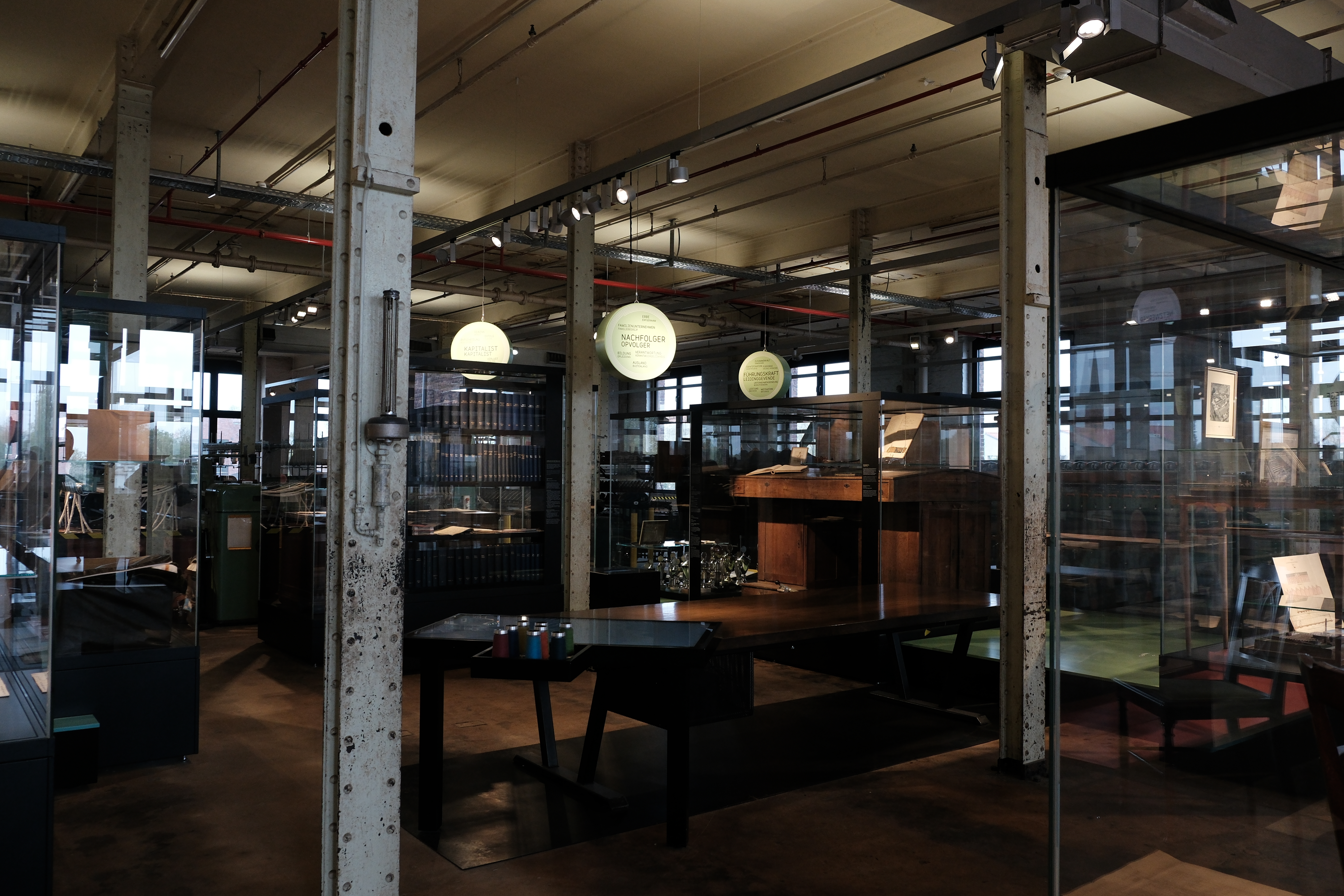
Permanent exhibition in the Spinnerei

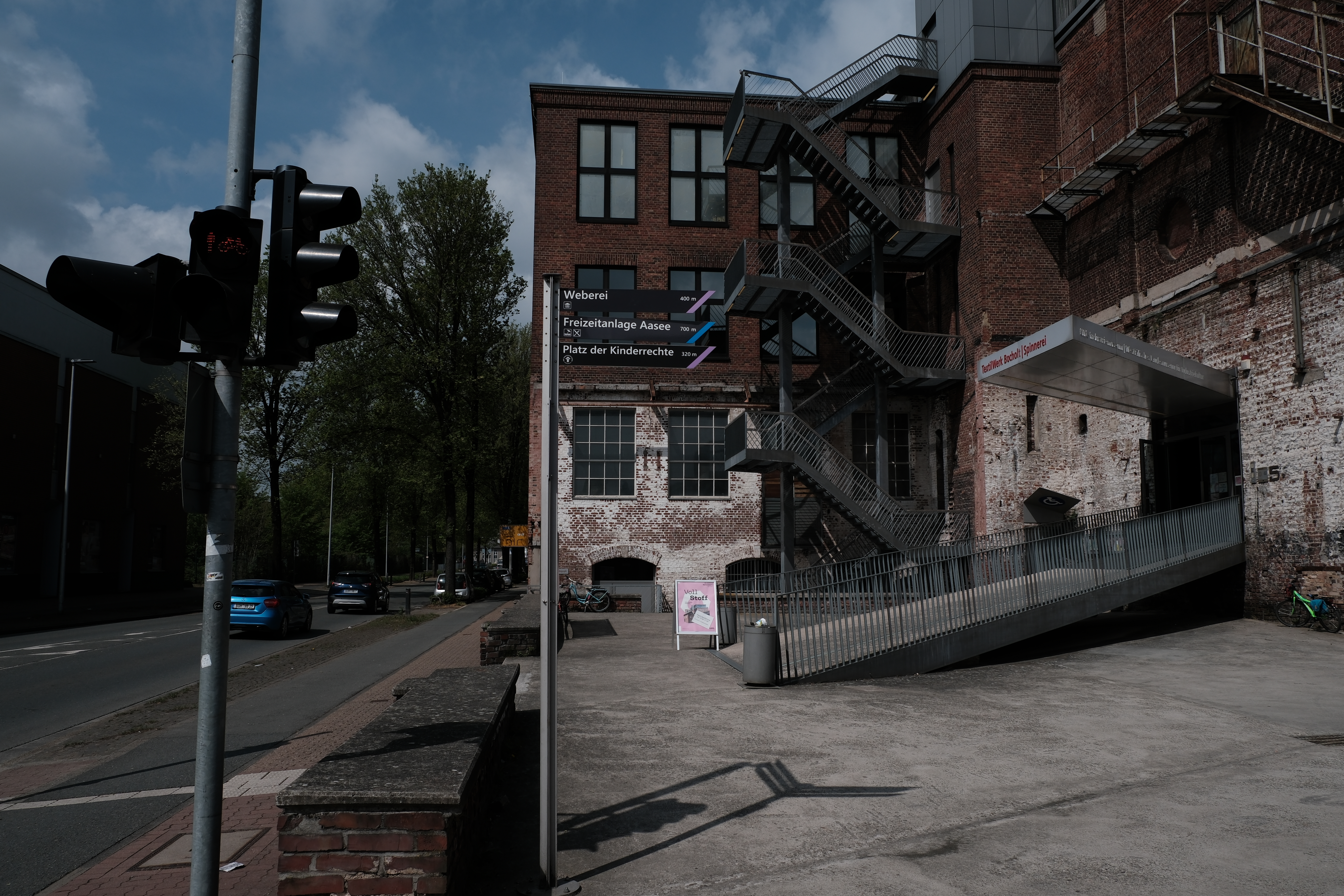
Entrance area on Industriestraße

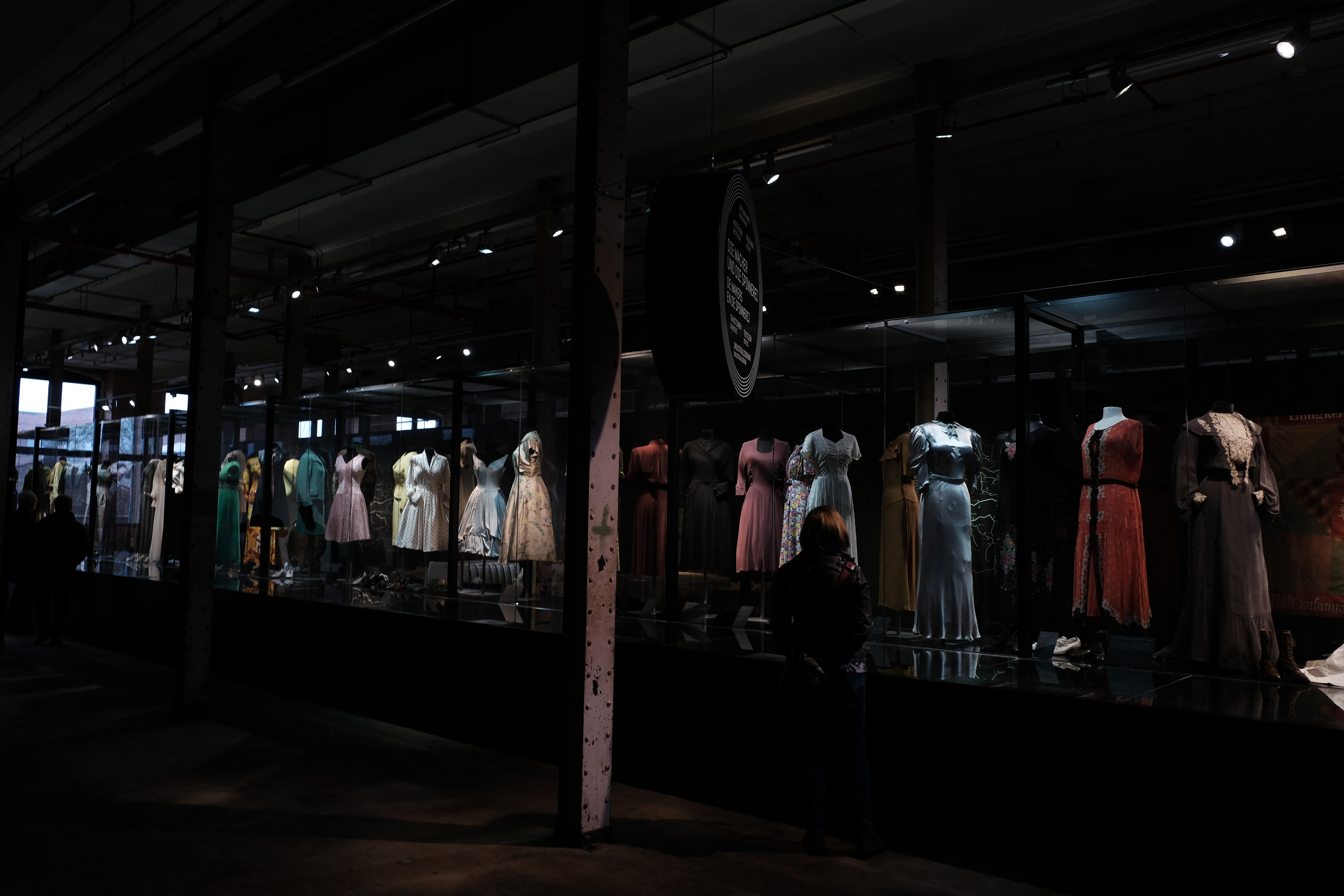
Fashion through the ages

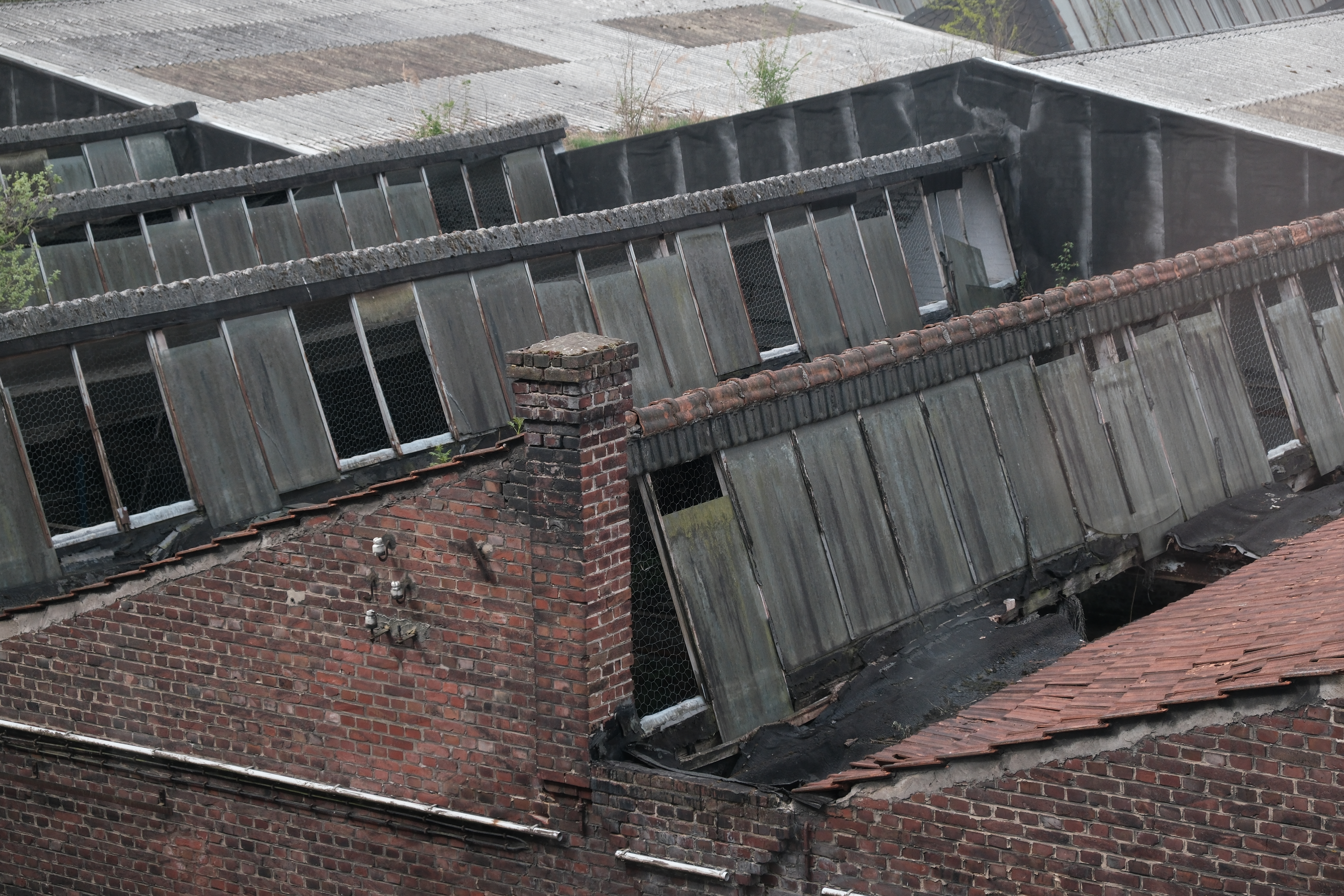
Dilapidated industrial building next to the Spinnerei

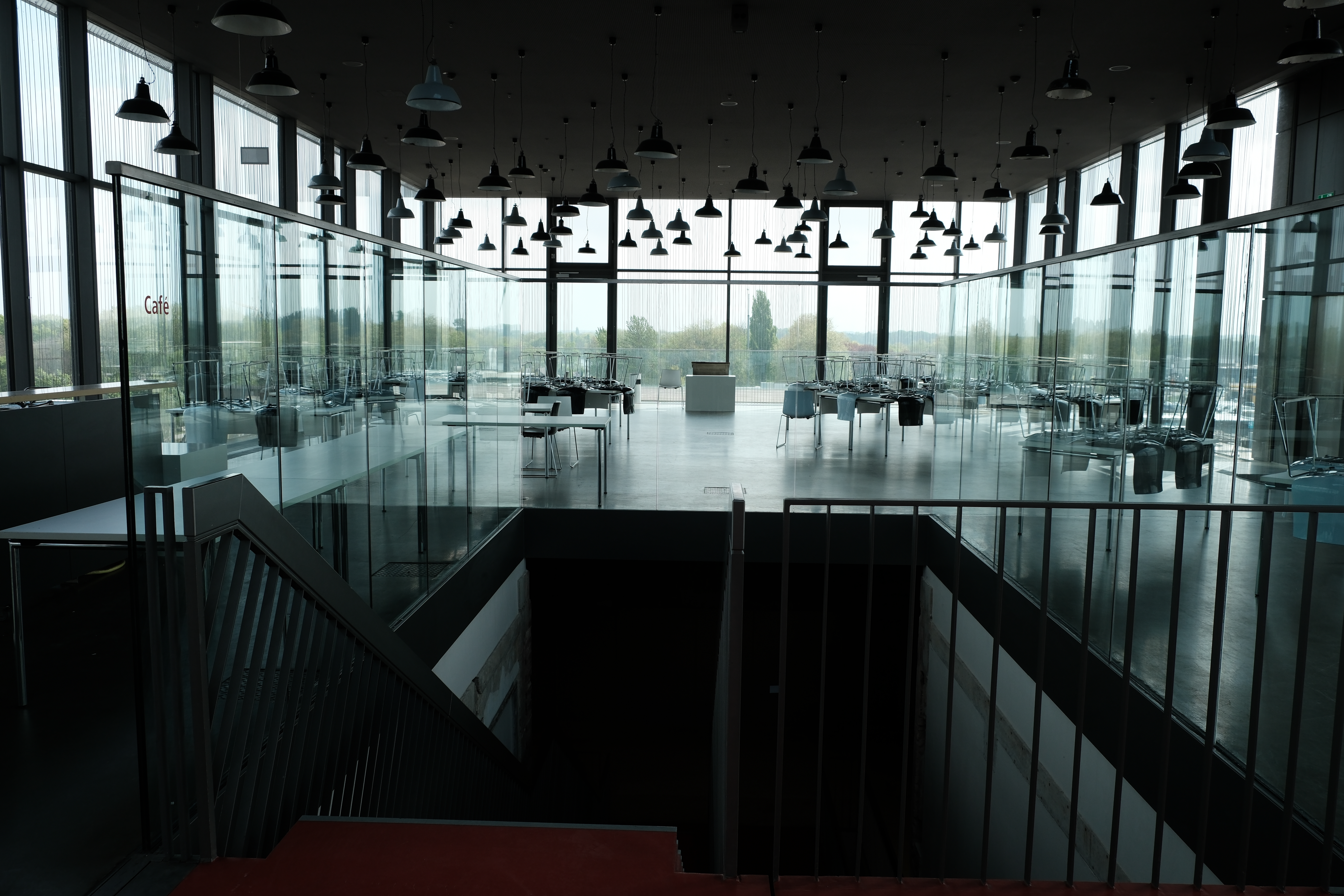
Event room

== Collections ==
In the weaving mill, only a part of the collection is displayed. Since 1984 samples have been collected of all aspects of the spinning (mule and ring spinning), weaving (raw cotton weaving, coloured woven goods, ribbon weaving) process and the finishing processes (bleaching, dyeing, printing). In addition, the fields of knitting (vests, jumpers), embroidery, ornamental textiles (ribbons, braiding and trimmings), lace and curtain-making are separate themes within the collection.

The museum stores contain complete specialised workshops and an extensive collection of historic pattern books, fabric samples, designs and drawings.

The spinning mill is used for exhibition, meeting space and temporary displays.

== See also ==
- Queen Street Mill
