= Schlinge (river) =

River in Germany

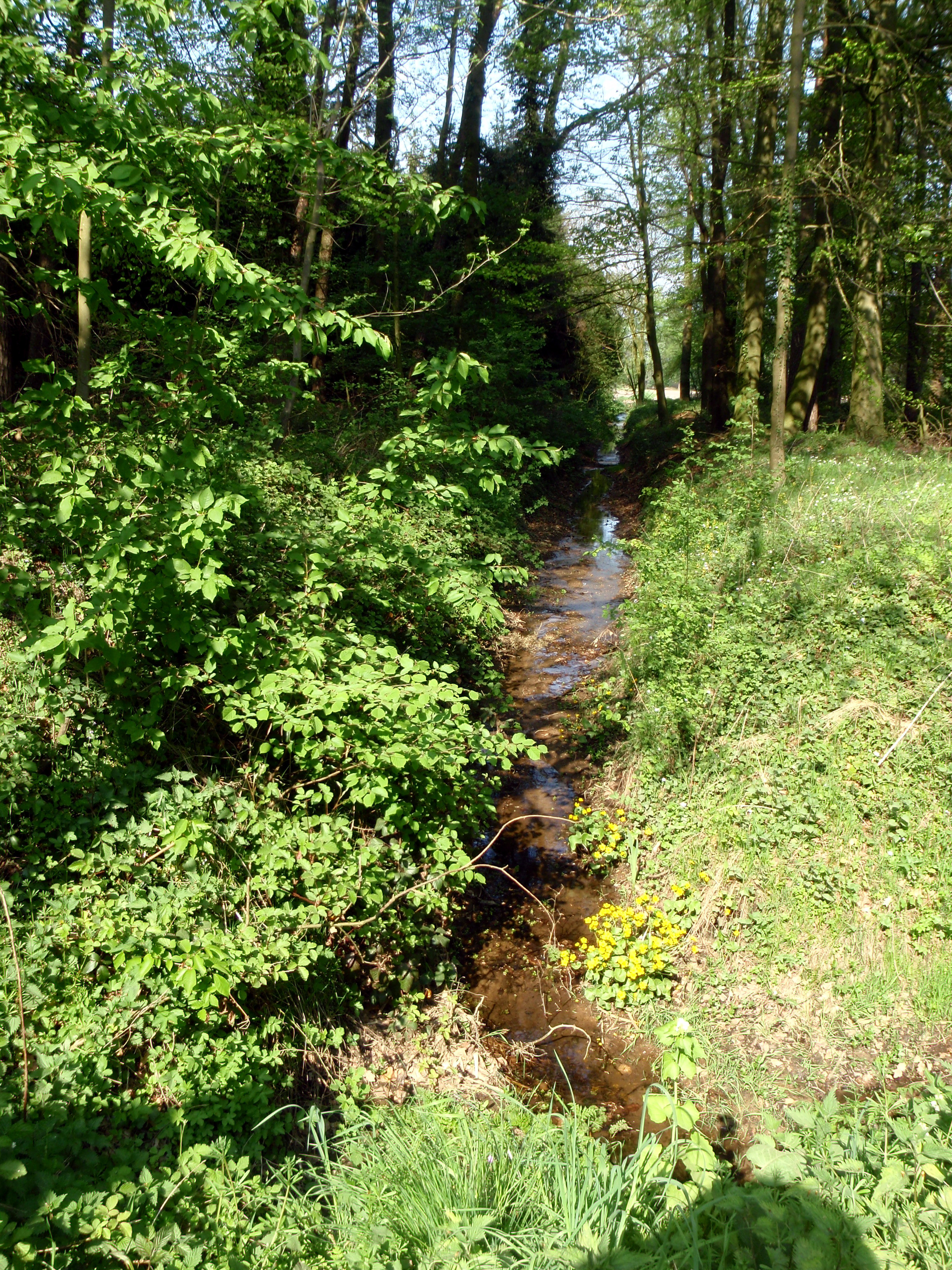

Location
- Countries: Germany; Netherlands
- State: North Rhine-Westphalia
- Province: Gelderland

Physical characteristics
- Mouth
  - location: Oude IJssel
  - coordinates: 51.9350°N 6.3197°E
- Length: 55.4 km (34.4 mi)
- Basin size: 197 km^{2} (76 sq mi)

Basin features
- Progression: Oude IJssel→ IJssel→ IJsselmeer

Schlinge is a river of North Rhine-Westphalia, Germany, and Gelderland, Netherlands. Dutch names are Boven-Slinge and Bielheimerbeek. Its source is between Gescher and Stadtlohn. It flows generally west through Südlohn, Winterswijk, Bredevoort, Aalten and Varsseveld. It flows into the Oude IJssel between Gaanderen and Doetinchem.

== See also ==
- List of rivers of North Rhine-Westphalia
