= Cornplanter (disambiguation) =

Cornplanter (c. 1750–1836) (Gaiänt'wakê or John Abeel) was a Seneca war-chief, ancestor of all others with the name

Cornplanter may refer to:

== People ==
- Edward Cornplanter (1856–1918) (So-son-do-wa), Seneca chief and religious leader
- Carrie Cornplanter (1887–1918) (Teton), Seneca artist, daughter of Edward
- Jesse Cornplanter (1889–1957) (Hayonhwonhish), Seneca artist and author, son of Edward, last male descendant of John

== Places ==
- Cornplanter State Forest, a Pennsylvanian wood
- Cornplanter Township, Venango County, Pennsylvania, United States
- Cornplanter Tract, a now-flooded tract of land in Warren County, Pennsylvania

== Streams ==
- Cornplanter Run (Oil Creek), a tributary of Oil Creek in Pennsylvania

== See also ==
- Corn planter, a planter (farm implement) for maize (corn)
