= List of Spanish flu cases =

The 1918–1920 flu pandemic, commonly referred to as the Spanish flu, caused millions of deaths worldwide.

To maintain morale, wartime censors minimized early reports of illness and mortality in Germany, the United Kingdom, France, and the United States. Papers were free to report the epidemic's effects in neutral Restoration-era Spain (such as the grave illness of King Alfonso XIII). This created a false impression of Spain as especially hard hit, thereby giving rise to the pandemic's nickname, "Spanish flu".

== Notable fatalities ==
Listed alphabetically by surname

- Turki I bin Abdulaziz, eldest son of Ibn Saud of Saudi Arabia (1919)
- Johnny Aitken, American auto racer, led first lap of the first Indianapolis 500 (October 15, 1918)
- Rodrigues Alves, Brazilian re-elected president, died before taking office (January 16, 1919)
- Robert Anderson, Scotland Yard official (November 15, 1918)
- Guillaume Apollinaire, French poet (November 9, 1918)
- Felix Arndt, American pianist (October 16, 1918)
- Dudley John Beaumont, British army officer and painter, husband of the Dame of Sark (November 24, 1918)
- Louis Botha, first Prime Minister of the Union of South Africa (August 27, 1919)
- Randolph Bourne, American progressive writer and public intellectual (December 22, 1918)
- Ivan Cankar, Slovenian writer (December 11, 1918)
- Bernard Capes, British novelist (2 November 1918)
- Amadeo de Souza Cardoso, Portuguese painter (25 October 1918)
- Kate Carmack, founder of the Klondike Gold Rush (March 29, 1920)
- Larry Chappell, American baseball player (November 8, 1918)
- Rose Cleveland, First Lady of the United States of America, sister of President Grover Cleveland (November 22, 1918)
- John H. Collins, American film director, writer, and husband of actress Viola Dana (October 31, 1918)
- Carrie Cornplanter, Native American artist and descendant of diplomat Cornplanter (late 1918)
- Gaby Deslys, French actress and dancer (February 11, 1920)
- Anton Dilger, medical doctor, mastermind of Germany's World War I secret bioterror sabotage (October 17, 1918)
- Horace Elgin Dodge, American automobile manufacturing pioneer (December 10, 1920)
- John Francis Dodge, American automobile manufacturing pioneer (January 14, 1920)
- "Admiral" Dot, American circus performer under P. T. Barnum (October 28, 1918)
- Angus Douglas, Scottish international footballer (December 14, 1918)
- Charles A. Doyen, United States Marine Corps brigadier general (October 6, 1918)
- Prince Erik, Duke of Västmanland (Erik Gustav Ludvig Albert Bernadotte), Prince of Sweden (September 20, 1918)
- George Freeth, early twentieth century surfer and lifeguard in California (April 7, 1919)
- Harold Gilman, British painter (February 12, 1919)
- Henry G. Ginaca, American engineer, inventor of the Ginaca machine (October 19, 1918)
- Harry Glenn, American baseball player (October 12, 1918)
- Myrtle Gonzalez, American film actress (October 22, 1918)
- Edward Kidder Graham, President of the University of North Carolina (October 26, 1918)
- Charles Griffes, American composer (April 8, 1920)
- Wilhelm Gross, Austrian mathematician (October 22, 1918)
- Jāzeps Grosvalds, Latvian painter (February 1, 1920)
- Joe Hall, Canadian ice hockey defenceman (Montreal Canadiens), member of the Hockey Hall of Fame (April 6, 1919)
- Harry Harkness, American aviator and race car driver (January 23, 1919)
- Phoebe Hearst, mother of William Randolph Hearst (April 13, 1919)
- Hugh Henderson, Scottish checker player, twice winner (1912, 1915) of US National title
- Alfred Hindmarsh, New Zealand Labour Party leader, lawyer and politician (November 13, 1918)
- B. C. Hucks, English aviator and test pilot (November 7, 1918)
- Shelley Hull, American stage actor (January 14, 1919)
- Jack Inglis, professional basketball player (October 7, 1918)
- Margit Kaffka, Hungarian writer and poet (December 1, 1918)
- Joseph Kaufman, American actor and film director (February 1, 1918)
- Lyman W.V. Kennon, American brigadier general (September 9, 1918)
- Vera Kholodnaya, Russian actress (February 16, 1919)
- Gustav Klimt, Austrian artist, painter (February 6, 1918)
- Bohumil Kubišta, Czech painter (November 27, 1918)
- Gilda Langer, German actress (January 31, 1920)
- Hans E. Lau, Danish astronomer (October 16, 1918)
- Julian L'Estrange English stage and screen actor (October 22, 1918)
- Ruby Lindsay, Australian illustrator and painter (March 12, 1919)
- Harold Lockwood, American silent film star (October 19, 1918)
- Rosalia Lombardo, Italian Child and daughter of Italian General Mario Lombardo (December 6, 1920)
- Andrée Lumière, French Actress and daughter of Auguste Lumière and Marguerite Lumière (November 26, 1918)
- Francisco Marto, Portuguese Fátima child (April 4, 1919)
- Jacinta Marto, Portuguese Fátima child (February 20, 1920)
- Alan Arnett McLeod, Canadian soldier and Victoria Cross recipient (6 November 1918)
- Dan McMichael, manager of Scottish association football club Hibernian (February 6, 1919)
- Léon Morane, French aircraft company founder and pre-World War I aviator (October 20, 1918)
- William Francis Murray, postmaster of Boston and former U.S. Representative (September 21, 1918)
- Silk O'Loughlin, American baseball umpire (December 20, 1918)
- William Osler, Canadian physician, co founder of Johns Hopkins Hospital (December 29, 1919)
- Ōyama Sutematsu, first Japanese woman to receive a college degree (February, 1919)
- Hubert Parry, British composer (October 7, 1918)
- George W. Perkins, American politician and businessman (June 18, 1920)
- Niko Pirosmani, Georgian naïve painter (April 9, 1918)
- Henry Ragas, American pianist of the Original Dixieland Jazz Band (February 18, 1919)
- Stephen Sydney Reynolds, English writer (February 14, 1919)
- Lunsford Richardson, inventor of Vicks VapoRub and junk mail (August 21, 1919)
- William Leefe Robinson, British Victoria Cross recipient (December 31, 1918)
- Edmond Rostand, French dramatist, best known for his play Cyrano de Bergerac (December 2, 1918)
- Archduke Franz Karl Salvator of Austria, Austro-Hungarian royalty and military officer (December 10, 1918)
- Morton Schamberg, American modernist artist (October 13, 1918)
- Egon Schiele, Austrian painter (October 31, 1918, Vienna)
- Reggie Schwarz, South African cricketer and rugby player (November 18, 1918)
- Byam Shaw, British painter (January 26, 1919)
- Martin Sheridan, Irish-American athlete and Olympic Gold Medalist (March 27, 1918)
- Hamby Shore, Canadian ice hockey player (October 13, 1918)
- Robert W. Speer, mayor of Denver (May 14, 1918)
- Walter Stradling, English born cinematographer (July 4, 1918)
- Willard Dickerman Straight, American investment banker, publisher, reporter, Army Reserve officer and diplomat (December 1, 1918)
- Yakov Sverdlov, Bolshevik party leader and official of the Russian Republic established by the February 1917 Revolution (March 16, 1919)
- Mark Sykes, British politician and diplomat, body exhumed 2008 for scientific research (February 16, 1919)
- Dark Cloud (actor), born Elijah Tahamont, Native American actor, in Los Angeles (September 17, 1918)
- Prince Tsunehisa Takeda, Japanese Imperial Prince, the founder of the Takeda-no-miya collateral branch (April 23, 1919)
- ʻAnaseini Takipō, Queen Dowager of Tonga (November 26, 1918)
- Frederick Trump, grandfather of 45th and 47th President of the United States Donald Trump (May 30, 1918)
- Prince Umberto, Count of Salemi, member of the Italian royal family (October 19, 1918)
- Minik Wallace, Inuit (October 29, 1918)
- King Watzke, American violinist and bandleader (1920)
- Max Weber, German political sociologist and economist (June 14, 1920)
- Pearl F. "Specks" Webster, American baseball player (September 16, 1918)
- Bill Yawkey, Major League Baseball executive and owner of the Detroit Tigers, in Augusta, Georgia, US (March 5, 1919)
- Ella Flagg Young, American educator (October 26, 1918)

== In utero effects ==
Children of women who were pregnant during the pandemic ran the risk of lifelong effects. One in three of the more than 25 million who contracted the flu in the United States was a woman of childbearing age. A study of US census data from 1960 to 1980 found that the children born to this group of women had more physical ailments and a lower lifetime income than those born a few months earlier or later. The study also found that persons born in states with more severe exposure to the pandemic experienced worse outcomes than persons born in states with less severe exposure.

== Notable survivors ==
- Alexandrine of Mecklenburg-Schwerin (1879–1952), Queen of Denmark
- Alfonso XIII (1886–1941), King of Spain
- Mustafa Kemal Atatürk (1881–1938), founding father and first president of the Republic of Turkey
- Walter Benjamin (1892–1940), German-Jewish philosopher and Marxist literary critic
- Raymond Chandler (1888–1959), American novelist and screenwriter
- Charles I (1887–1922), Emperor of Austria
- Walt Disney (1901–1966), cartoonist
- Amelia Earhart (1897–1939), American aviation pioneer and author
- Peter Fraser (1884–1950), New Zealand prime minister
- Mahatma Gandhi (1869–1948), leader of the campaign for India's independence from British rule
- Lillian Gish (1893–1993), American early motion picture actress
- Haile Selassie I (1892–1975), Emperor of Ethiopia
- Rufus Isaacs, 1st Marquess of Reading (1860–1935), British politician and judge
- Joseph Joffre (1852–1931), French World War I general, victor of the Marne
- Jim Jordan (1896–1988), American actor best known as Fibber McGee and Molly
- Franz Kafka (1883–1924), German-speaking Jewish author
- David Lloyd George (1863–1945), British prime minister
- Joe Martin, American animal actor
- Prince Maximilian of Baden (1867–1929), Chancellor of Germany during the armistice
- Edvard Munch (1863–1944), Norwegian painter
- Alfred Noyes (1880–1958), English poet
- Georgia O'Keeffe (1887–1986), American modernist painter
- John J. Pershing (1860–1948), American general
- Boies Penrose (1860–1921), United States Senator
- Mary Pickford (1892–1979), American film actress
- Lakshman Singh (1908–1989), last maharawal of Dungarpur State (1928–1948), Member of Parliament (Rajya Sabha, 1952–1958), Member of the Legislative Council of Rajasthan (1962–1989)
- Katherine Anne Porter (1890–1980), Pulitzer Prize-winning American writer
- Franklin D. Roosevelt (1882–1945), American president
- Jan Kanty Steczkowski (1862–1929), Prime Minister of the Regency Council
- Leó Szilárd (1898–1964), nuclear physicist, discoverer of the nuclear chain reaction
- Robert Walser (1878–1956), Swiss modernist author
- Wilhelm II, German Emperor (1859–1941)
- Woodrow Wilson (1856–1924), American president
- Sterling North (1906–1974), American writer

== See also ==
- Bibliography of the history of the 1918 influenza pandemic
- Deaths from the Spanish flu pandemic by country
