= Archduchess Marie Valerie of Austria =

Austrian archduchess

Marie Valerie of Austria
- Royal Princess of Hungary and Bohemia
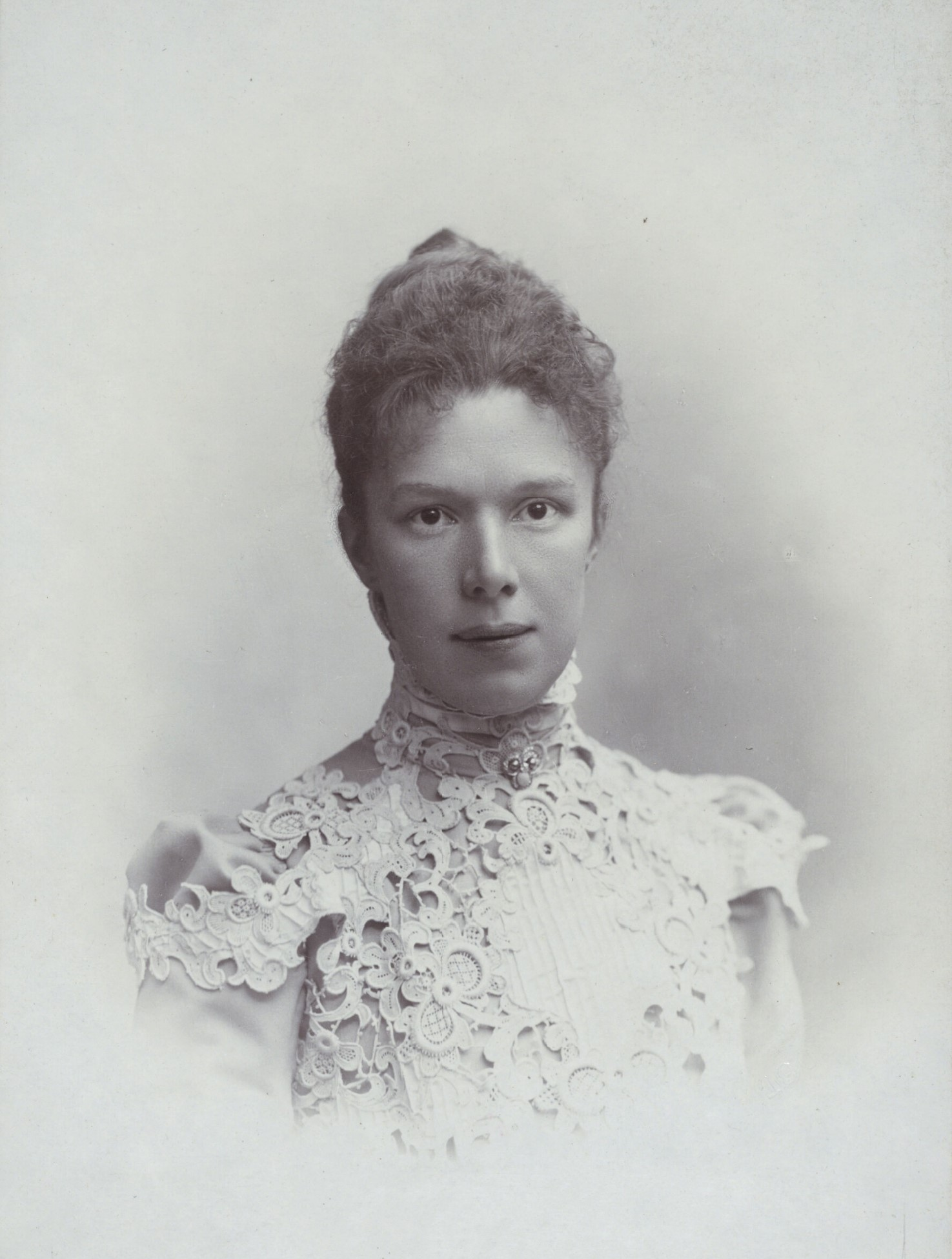
- Portrait by Carl Pietzner, 1903
- Born: 22 April 1868; Buda, Kingdom of Hungary, Austria-Hungary
- Died: 6 September 1924 (aged 56); Vienna, First Austrian Republic
- Spouse: Archduke Franz Salvator of Austria (m. 1890)
- Issue: Archduchess Elisabeth Franziska; Archduke Franz Karl; Archduke Hubert Salvator; Archduchess Hedwig; Archduke Theodor Salvator; Archduchess Gertrud; Archduchess Maria Elisabeth; Archduke Clemens Salvator; Archduchess Mathilde; Archduchess Agnes
Names
- Marie Valerie Mathilde Amalie Habsburg-Lothringen
- House: Habsburg-Lorraine
- Father: Franz Joseph I of Austria
- Mother: Elisabeth in Bavaria

Archduchess Marie Valerie of Austria (Marie Valerie Mathilde Amalie; 22 April 1868 – 6 September 1924) was the youngest child of Emperor Franz Joseph I and Empress Elisabeth of Austria. She was usually called Valerie.

On 31 July 1890, she married Archduke Franz Salvator of Austria; the marriage caused a rift between the Archduchess and her siblings. Marie Valerie's marriage was, with Empress Elisabeth's support, a union of love and desire, while her older siblings were pressed into dynastic unions.

== Early life ==
Archduchess Marie Valerie was born on 22 April 1868 in Buda, Hungary to Emperor Franz Joseph I of Austria and his wife, Elisabeth in Bavaria. She had an older sister, Archduchess Gisela, and an older brother, Crown Prince Rudolf. Her eldest sibling, Archduchess Sophie had already died by the time she was born. Her mother was especially attached to Valerie, who was born ten years after the imperial couple's third child, and whom Elisabeth was allowed to raise herself after her first three children were taken from her in infancy and raised by the Emperor's mother, Archduchess Sophie. Sophie herself wrote to Elisabeth's mother, Duchess Ludovika in Bavaria, "Sisi is completely absorbed by her love and care for this irresistible little angel."

She was Elisabeth's favorite child by far, acidly referred to by some courtiers as "die Einzige" ("the only one") because Elisabeth paid so much more attention to her than to her siblings. Valerie loved her mother, but according to her diaries, often felt embarrassed and overwhelmed by Elisabeth's concentration on her, particularly as she was modest and practical.

Another of Valerie's nicknames was "the Hungarian child", as her birth had been a concession by Elisabeth, who disliked physical intimacy and pregnancy, in exchange for Franz Joseph's reconciliation with Hungary, her most favored part of the Empire. This process culminated in their joint coronation in Buda on 8 June 1867 as King and Queen of Hungary. Valerie was born a little over nine months later.

Elisabeth deliberately chose Hungary as her child's birthplace; no royal child had been born in Hungary for centuries. Had Valerie been a boy, she would have been named Stephen after Hungary's canonized King and patron saint. According to historian Brigitte Hamann, a boy born to the Queen of Hungary in the castle at Budapest would have raised the possibility of his someday becoming its king, separating Hungary from the Austrian empire. Due to this, there was universal relief at the Viennese court that Valerie was a girl.

Malicious rumors began to spread that Valerie was in truth the daughter of Elisabeth's friend and admirer Gyula Andrássy, the Hungarian prime minister. These persisted into Valerie's childhood, hurting her deeply. However, she physically resembled Franz Joseph more than any of her siblings, even more so as she grew older, and eventually the hearsay stopped. Due to the atmosphere they created, Valerie developed a lifelong antipathy toward anything to do with Hungary, exacerbated by Elisabeth's insistence on speaking to her only in Hungarian. She was joyful when she was given permission to speak German with her father, whom she worshipped. In addition, she spoke English, French, and Italian fluently. She loved to write plays and poems, and was a talented amateur artist who particularly enjoyed painting flowers. She was a great supporter of the Burgtheater in Vienna, and attended its productions as often as possible.

== Marriage ==
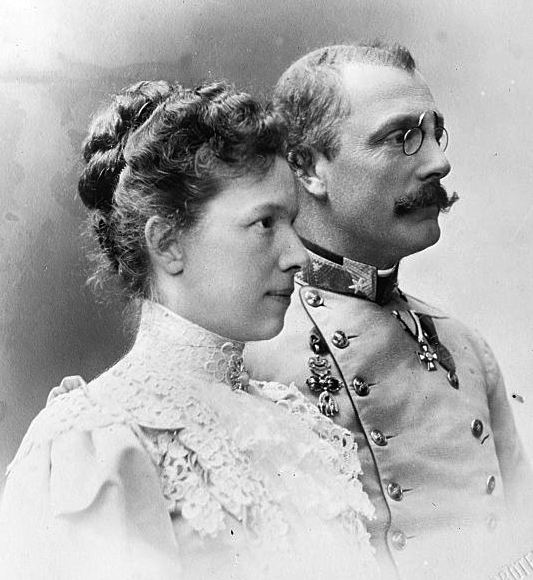
Marie Valerie and Franz Salvator

In Bad Ischl on 31 July 1890, Valerie married her third cousin Archduke Franz Salvator. They had met in 1886 at a ball, but Valerie waited several years to be sure that her feelings toward Franz Salvator were strong enough for a successful marriage. It was hoped by many at court that she would marry someone like the Crown Prince of Saxony, the Prince Royal of Portugal or Prince Alfons of Bavaria as she courted with him. Nonetheless, Empress Elisabeth declared that Valerie would be allowed to marry even a chimney sweep if she so desired (in contrast to her other children, who both had to make dynastic marriages). Valerie chose Franz Salvator, a relatively minor prince from the Tuscan branch of the Austrian imperial family who had no great wealth to offer, and Elisabeth, as promised, supported her favorite daughter. This caused a deep rift between Valerie and her siblings for a time, but eventually Rudolf reconciled with her when Valerie and Franz became engaged on Christmas 1888. However, the relationship between Valerie and Rudolf's wife Princess Stéphanie of Belgium remained cold even after Rudolf's death.

Valerie's solemn renunciation of her rights to the Austrian throne, which was necessary for the marriage to proceed, took place on 16 July 1890 at the Hermesvilla. The young couple's festive wedding followed in the parish church of Bad Ischl on 31 July. The ceremony was conducted by the Bishop of Linz, Franz Maria Doppelbauer. Afterwards, Valerie and Franz honeymooned in Italy, Switzerland and Bavaria.

=== Children ===
Marie Valerie and Franz Salvator had 10 children:

Name	Birth	Death	Notes
Elisabeth Franziska "Ella"	27 January 1892	29 January 1930	married Count Georg of Waldburg-Zeil-Hohenems (1878–1955), had issue.
Franz Karl Salvator	17 February 1893	12 December 1918	died unmarried of the Spanish flu.
Hubert Salvator	30 April 1894	24 March 1971	married Princess Rosemary of Salm-Salm, had issue.
Hedwig	24 September 1896	1 November 1970	married Count Bernard of Stolberg-Stolberg (1881–1952), had issue.
Theodor Salvator	9 October 1899	8 April 1978	married Countess Maria Theresa of Waldburg-Zeil-Trauchburg (1901–1967), had issue. Theodor Salvator and Maria Theresa are the maternal grandparents of Father Florian.
Gertrud	19 November 1900	20 December 1962	married Count Georg of Waldburg-Zeil-Hohenems (1878–1955), widower of her sister Elisabeth, had issue.
Maria Elisabeth	19 November 1901	29 December 1936	died unmarried.
Clemens Salvator	6 October 1904	20 August 1974	married Countess Elisabeth Rességuier de Miremont (1906–2000), took the title Prince of Altenburg, had issue.
Mathilde	9 August 1906	18 October 1991	married Austrian politician Ernst Hefel, no issue.
Agnes	26 June 1911	26 June 1911	died at the age of eight hours.

== Later life ==
At first, Valerie and Franz lived at the Schloss Lichtenegg. Though on 11 June 1895, the couple purchased Schloss Wallsee on the Danube River from its then owner, Alfred, Duke of Saxe-Coburg-Gotha, and completely renovated it. When the renovation was finished, a ceremony marking their moving into the new palace was held on 4 September 1897. There was great celebration of the event in Wallsee due to Valerie's popularity. Even after her marriage, Marie Valerie remained in close contact with her ageing father, who greatly appreciated the informal atmosphere in his youngest daughter's family.

She was known and loved for her generous involvement in local charitable endeavors. In 1900, she became a patron of the Red Cross, for which she founded hospitals and raised considerable sums of money; she was also patron of seven other charities. During World War I she created a hospital barracks in the castle itself and helped care for the wounded. She was a devout Catholic who also spent much time supporting religious charities and was known to the people as the "Angel of Waldsee". She was also a Dame of the Star Cross Order.

Valerie was greatly affected by the suicide of her brother Rudolf on 30 January 1889, and the assassination of her mother Elisabeth in September 1898. She and her sister Gisela were a great support to their father in the aftermath of these tragedies. Together with Elisabeth's ladies-in-waiting Valerie also sorted out Elisabeth's literary legacy, her letters and correspondences. In her diary Valerie noted that her parents' relationship and alienation had only improved during the last few years of her mother's life. She also felt that taking care of her aging father, Emperor Franz Joseph, was some sort of "a trial".

While the marriage of Valerie and Franz was harmonious at first, it became less so with time. Franz had many affairs, including one with a dancer Stephanie Richter, who was later known as "Hitler's Spy Princess" for her espionage activities before and during World War II. In 1914, she gave birth to a son by him, Franz Joseph, whom he acknowledged as his while Valerie was still alive. Valerie faced these blows stoically, confiding only in her journal.

After the end of World War I, Valerie officially recognized the end of the Habsburg monarchy and signed documents renouncing all rights toward the same for herself and her descendants. The renunciation allowed her to keep her home and possessions.

== Death ==
Valerie died in Schloss Wallsee on 6 September 1924 of lymphoma. Shortly before her death, her sister Gisela wrote in a letter, "I must add that I have seen Valerie - fully conscious, completely aware of her condition, and so devoutly accepting, even joyfully anticipating her impending departure, that I believe an unexpected recovery would actually disappoint her." She is buried in a crypt behind the high altar at the parish church in Sindelburg, Austria. Several thousand people followed her coffin to its resting place.

On 28 April 1934, ten years after Valerie's death, Franz married a second time, to Freiin (a title corresponding to "Baroness") Melanie von Riesenfels. This was a morganatic marriage; the wedding took place in Vienna. The pair had met after Valerie's death at Melanie's home, Seisenegg Palace, where she lived with her sisters Maria Anna and Johanna. After their wedding, the couple lived at Seisenegg.

Franz Salvator died on 20 April 1939 in Vienna.

The Mária Valéria bridge joining Hungarian town Esztergom and Slovak town Štúrovo (then Parkány) across the river Danube was opened in 1895. It was named after Marie Valerie.

== Honours ==
Imperial monogram of Archduchess Marie Valerie of Austria

She received the following orders:

- Austria-Hungary:
  - Dame of the Order of the Starry Cross
  - Grand Cross of the Order of Elizabeth, 1898
- Kingdom of Bavaria:
  - Dame of the Order of Saint Elizabeth
- Kingdom of Portugal:
  - Dame of the Order of Saint Isabel
