= Anti-Mask League of San Francisco =

1919 San Francisco organization

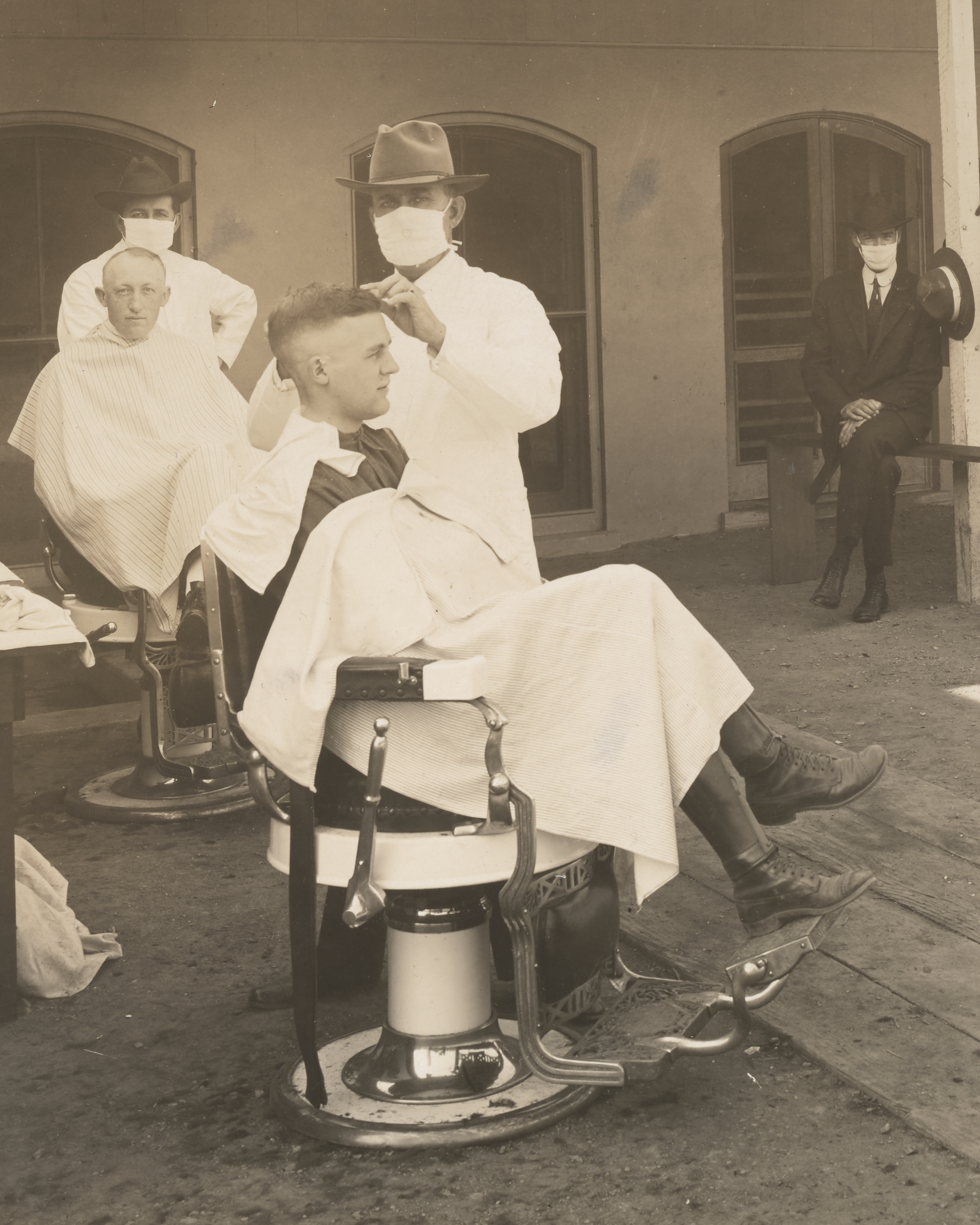
Barbers in California wearing masks during the epidemic

The Anti-Mask League was an organization formed in San Francisco, California, United States, to protest an ordinance which required people in that city to wear masks during the 1918 influenza pandemic. The ordinance it protested lasted less than one month before being repealed. Due to the short period of the league's existence, its exact membership is difficult to determine; however, an estimated 4,500 citizens showed up to a meeting to protest the second ordinance in January 1919.

== Background ==
Cases of the 1918 influenza began to appear in San Francisco during the fall of 1918. The first documented case was in late September; by mid-October, the city had more than 2,000 cases (~400 per 100,000). The city's Board of Health enacted various measures to try to curb the disease, such as banning gatherings, closing schools and theaters, and warning citizens to avoid crowds. Professions that served customers (including barbers, hotel and rooming house employees, bank tellers, druggists, store clerks) were required to wear masks. On October 25, the city passed an ordinance requiring everyone in San Francisco to wear a mask while in public or when in a group of two or more people, except at mealtime.

Initial compliance with the mask ordinance was high with an estimated 80% of people wearing masks in public. The Red Cross sold masks at the ferry terminal for incoming passengers. Anyone who failed to wear a mask or wore it improperly was charged with disturbing the peace, warned, and for subsequent violations fined or jailed. The city health officer and the mayor both paid fines for not wearing masks at a boxing match.

The mask ordinance was annulled effective November 21, 1918; however, when cases of the flu began to increase again, a new ordinance mandating masks took effect January 17, 1919.

== League formation ==
Although there were some complaints from citizens during the initial period of mask-wearing, the new ordinance in 1919 galvanized more serious opposition and the Anti-Mask League was formed. Members of the league included physicians, citizens, civil libertarians, and at least one member of the Board of Supervisors. An estimated 4,500 citizens attended the meeting on January 25. Some members of the league wanted to collect signatures on a petition to end the mask requirement, while others wanted to initiate recall procedures for the city health officer. Members of the anti-mask league also agitated for San Francisco Mayor James Rolph Jr., to resign if he did not repeal the ordinance. The president of the League, suffragist, attorney, and labor rights activist Mrs. E.C. Harrington, was a fierce critic of the mayor, and it has been suggested that the anti-mask league protests were politically motivated. The debate was heated. Some objections to the ordinance were based on questions of scientific data while others considered the requirement to infringe on civil liberties.

In addition to complaints from the Anti-Mask League, some health officers from other cities also contended that masks were not necessary. The San Francisco city health officer criticized the secretary of the state's Board of Health for questioning the efficacy of masks, saying "The attitude of the state board is encouraging the Anti-Mask League."

On January 27, the league presented a petition, signed by Mrs. E. C. Harrington as president, to the city's Board of Supervisors, requesting repeal of the mask ordinance. Newspapers across the world took note of the protesting organization. San Francisco lifted the mask requirement effective February 1, 1919, on the recommendation of the Board of Health.

== Historical analyses and comparisons ==
A study in 1919 concluded that mask mandates did not make any difference on the epidemic, while observing that a likely reason for their ineffectiveness was that masks were worn outdoors and not inside in gatherings when conditions for transmission would be greatest. It also noted that most masks were improperly constructed of inadequate materials.

However, according to medical historians in 2020, the decline in deaths from influenza in San Francisco can be partly attributed to the mandatory mask-wearing policies.

During the COVID-19 pandemic in the United States, opposition to mandatory wearing of face masks and anti-lockdown protests led to comparisons with the Anti-Mask League.

== See also ==
- Bibliography of the history of the 1918 influenza pandemic
- Anti-mask law (laws that deter concealing oneself)
- Face masks during the COVID-19 pandemic
- Protests over responses to the COVID-19 pandemic
