= Archduchess Hedwig of Austria =

Austrian archduchess (1896–1970

Archduchess Hedwig
- Countess of Stolberg-Stolberg
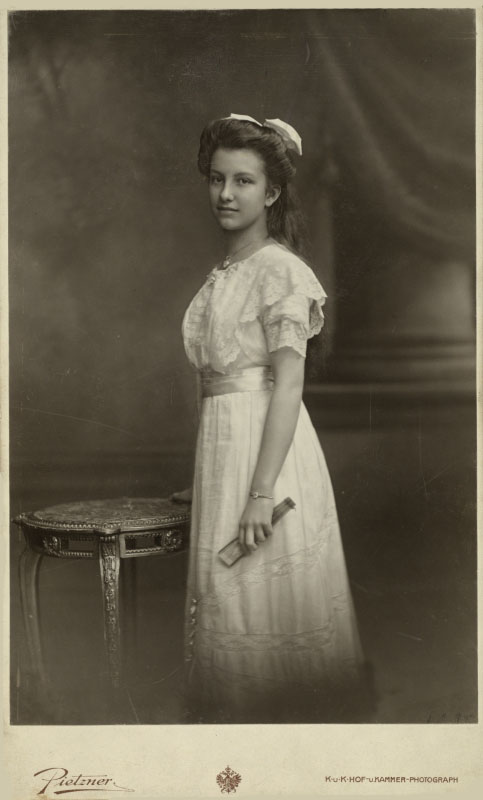
- Hedwig, 1913
- Born: 24 September 1896; Bad Ischl, Austria-Hungary
- Died: 1 November 1970 (aged 74); Hall in Tirol, Austria
- Spouse: Bernhard, Count zu Stolberg-Stolberg (m. 1918; died 1952)
- Issue: Marie Elisabeth zu Stolberg-Stolberg; Franz Josef zu Stolberg-Stolberg; Friedrich Leopold zu Stolberg-Stolberg; Bernhard zu Stolberg-Stolberg; Theresa zu Stolberg-Stolberg; Carl Franz zu Stolberg-Stolberg; Ferdinand zu Stolberg-Stolberg; Anna zu Stolberg-Stolberg; Magdalena zu Stolberg-Stolberg
Names
- German: Hedwig Maria Immakulata Michaela Ignatia
- House: Habsburg-Lorraine
- Father: Archduke Franz Salvator of Austria
- Mother: Archduchess Marie Valerie of Austria

Archduchess Hedwig of Austria ( 24 September 1896 – 1 November 1970) was a member of the Tuscan branch of the House of Habsburg-Lorraine. Through her mother Archduchess Marie Valerie of Austria, she was a granddaughter of Emperor Franz Joseph I of Austria.

== Early life ==
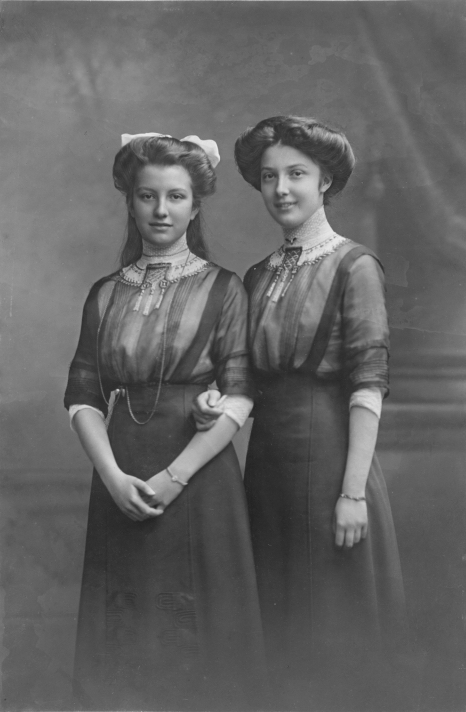
Hedwig with her sister Elisabeth Franziska, 1912

Archduchess Hedwig was born on 24 September 1896 at the Kaiservilla in Bad Ischl, Austria-Hungary. She was the second daughter and fourth child of Archduke Franz Salvator of Austria and Archduchess Marie Valerie of Austria, making her a maternal granddaughter of Emperor Franz Joseph I of Austria. Within her immediate family circle, she was affectionately known by the childhood nickname "Wiga". In 1897, her parents relocated their primary household to Schloss Wallsee, where Hedwig spent her formative years raised away from the strict ceremonial protocol of the imperial court in Vienna.

== Marriage and later life ==
Hedwig and her husband at Schloss Wallsee

On 24 April 1918, Archduchess Hedwig married Count Bernhard zu Stolberg-Stolberg (1881–1952) at Schloss Wallsee. He was the son of Count Leopold zu Stolberg-Stolberg and Mary Eddington. As a wedding gift in 1917, Hedwig's mother had granted her the historic Kühtai hunting lodge in Tyrol, an estate originally purchased by Emperor Franz Joseph I in 1893.

Following the collapse of the Austro-Hungarian Empire and the subsequent financial hardships faced by the aristocracy, Hedwig sought ways to maintain the family estate. In 1949, she successfully converted the Kühtai lodge into a commercial alpine ski resort, opening it to the public and contributing significantly to early winter tourism in the Tyrolean region. Hedwig spent her remaining years in Tyrol and died on 1 November 1970 at the age of 74 in Hall in Tirol, where she was interred in the family vault.

=== Issue ===
- Countess Marie Elisabeth zu Stolberg-Stolberg (1919–2012).
- Count Franz Josef zu Stolberg-Stolberg (1920–1986) married Elisabeth Christiane, Countess Kinsky von Wchinitz und Tettau in 1957 and had issue.
- Count Friedrich Leopold zu Stolberg-Stolberg (1921–2007) married Luisa von Pachmann in 1948 and had issue
- Count Bernhard Friedrich Hubertus zu Stolberg-Stolberg (1922–1958).
- Countess Therese Maria Valerie zu Stolberg-Stolberg (1923–1982) married Count Paul Joseph Wolff-Metternich zur Gracht in 1945 and had issue.
- Count Carl Franz zu Stolberg-Stolberg (1925–2003) married Editha von Schuchter in 1951, fathering three children before her death. He subsequently remarried to Maria Elisabeth von itsert in 1968, with whom he had two more children.
- Count Ferdinand Maria Immaculata zu Stolberg-Stolberg (1926–1998) married Baroness Jutta von Cramm in 1966 and had issue. Following their divorce in 1988, Jutta remarried to Pierre Louis Blanc.
- Countess Anna Regina zu Stolberg-Stolberg (1927–2002) and married Jacques Pierre de Spirlet in 1954 and had issue.
- Countess Magdalena Maria Mathilde zu Stolberg-Stolberg (1930–2024) married Baron Karl von Kripp zu Prunberg und Krippach in 1958 and had issue.

== Ancestry ==
Ancestors of Archduchess Hedwig of Austria

8. Leopold II, Grand Duke of Tuscany
4. Archduke Karl Salvator of Austria
9. Princess Maria Antonia of the Two Sicilies
2. Archduke Franz Salvator of Austria
10. Ferdinand II of the Two Sicilies
5. Princess Maria Immaculata of Bourbon-Two Sicilies
11. Archduchess Maria Theresa of Austria
1. Archduchess Hedwig of Austria
12. Archduke Franz Karl of Austria
6. Franz Joseph I of Austria
13. Princess Sophie of Bavaria
3. Archduchess Marie Valerie of Austria
14. Duke Maximilian Joseph in Bavaria
7. Duchess Elisabeth in Bavaria
15. Princess Ludovika of Bavaria

== Bibliography ==
- Lorenz, Reinkeep (1959). Kaiser Karl und der Untergang der Habsburgermonarchie (in German). Graz: Verlag Styria.
- Vocelka, Karl (2010). Die Familien Habsburg-Lothringen: Politik - Kultur - Mentalität (in German). Vienna: Böhlau Verlag. ISBN 978-3205785682.
