= Archduchess Gertrud, Countess of Waldburg-Zeil-Hohenems =

Archduchess of Austria (1900–1962)

Archduchess Gertrud of Austria
- Countess of Waldburg-Ziel-Hohenems
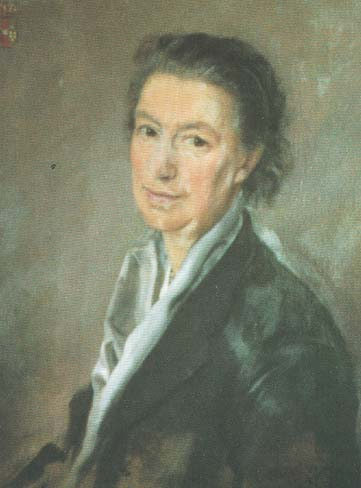
- Born: 19 November 1900; Wallsee, Cisleithania, Austria-Hungary
- Died: 20 December 1962 (aged 62); Ravensburg, Baden-Württemberg, Germany
- Burial: Bavaria
- Spouse: Georg of Waldburg-Zeil-Hohenems (m. 1931; died 1955)
- Issue: Countess Sophie; Count Joseph
Names
- German: Gertrud Maria Gisela Elisabeth Ignatia von Österreich
- House: Habsburg-Lorraine
- Father: Archduke Franz Salvator of Austria
- Mother: Archduchess Marie Valerie of Austria

Archduchess Gertrud of Austria (Gertrud Maria Gisela Elisabeth Ignatia; 19 November 1900 – 20 December 1962) was a member of the House of Habsburg-Lorraine and Countess of Waldburg-Zeil-Hohenems.

== Early life ==
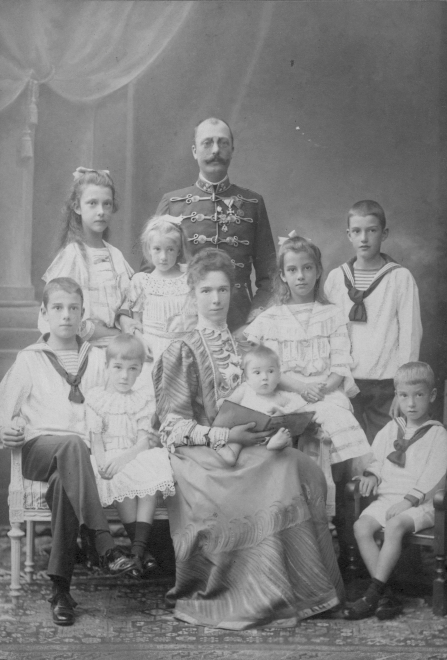
Gertud with her family; she is standing behind her mother on the left (c. 1905)

Gertrud was born in Wallsee on 19 November 1900. She was the third daughter of Franz Salvator of Austria-Tuscany and Marie Valerie of Austria. She was baptized on 23 November in the castle chapel of Wallsee, in the presence of the Emperor. Her godmother was Gisela of Austria, her mother's sister.

== Marriage and later life ==
On 29 December 1931, Archduchess Gertrud married Count Georg of Waldburg-Zeil-Hohenems (1878 – 1955) in Bad Ischl, Austria. The marriage was less than two years after Georg was widowed by her eldest sister, Elisabeth Franziska (1892 – 1930).

After marriage she lived at the Schloss Syrgenstein. The family archive she maintained there contained letters and documents from the House of Habsburg that have been appreciated by historians and authors such as Egon Caesar Conte Corti. The archive included the diary of her mother, Archduchess Marie Valerie, which was specifically mentioned in an acknowledgement by Corti. The letters between her maternal grandfather and great-grandmother, Emperor Franz Joseph I and Princess Sophie of Bavaria, that were published in Briefe Kaiser Franz Josephs I. an seine Mutter, 1838–1872 (1930), edited by Franz Schnürer, were also kept in the archive.

=== Issue ===
Gertrud and Georg had two children:

- Countess Sophie von Waldburg-Zeil-Hohenems (1932 – ) married Baron Wessel of the House of Loë in 1957 and had issue
- Count Joseph von Waldburg-Zeil-Hohenems (1934 – ) married Baroness Maria Benedikta von Redwitz in 1960, and had issue

== Gertrud in art ==
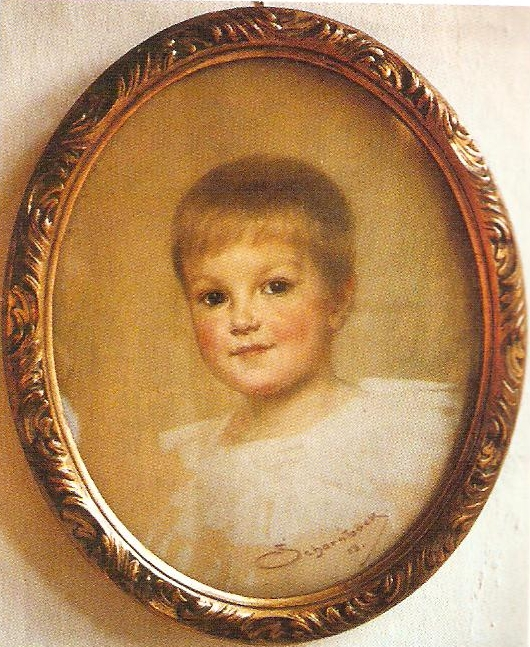
Portrait of Gertrud Archduchess of Austria-Tuscany (1903) by Alois Schornböck

A 1910 painting of Kaiser Franz I and his family by Wilhelm Gause; Gertrud is the blonde in a straw hat on the left

== Ancestry ==
Ancestors of Archduchess Gertrud, Countess of Waldburg-Zeil-Hohenems

8. Leopold II, Grand Duke of Tuscany
4. Archduke Karl Salvator of Austria
9. Princess Maria Antonia of the Two Sicilies
2. Archduke Franz Salvator of Austria
10. Ferdinand II of the Two Sicilies
5. Princess Maria Immacolata of Bourbon-Two Sicilies
11. Archduchess Maria Theresa of Austria
1. Archduchess Gertrud of Austria
12. Archduke Franz Karl of Austria
6. Franz Joseph I of Austria
13. Princess Sophie of Bavaria
3. Archduchess Marie Valerie of Austria
14. Duke Maximilian Joseph in Bavaria
7. Duchess Elisabeth in Bavaria
15. Princess Ludovika of Bavaria

== Bibliography ==
- Corti, Egon Caesar Conte; Sokol, Hans Hugo (1972). Kaiser Franz Joseph (in German) (2nd ed.). Graz: Verlag Styria. ISBN 978-3-222-10717-7. OCLC 9858080. OL 5373985M – via Internet Archive.
- Corti, Egon Caesar Conte (2003). Elisabeth "die seltsame Frau" ; nach dem schriftlichen Nachlaß der Kaiserin, den Tagebüchern ihrer Tochter und sonstigen unveröffentlichten Tagebüchern und Dokumenten [Elisabeth "the strange woman"; based on the Empress's written estate, her daughter's diaries and other unpublished diaries and documents] (in German). Augsburg: Weltbild. ISBN 978-3-8289-0548-1. OCLC 76647629. OL 32096059M – via Internet Archive.
- "Das Vaterland Newspaper". Das Vaterland (in German). Austria. 23 November 1900.
- Franz, Joseph I. (1930). Schnürer, Franz (ed.). Briefe kaiser Franz Josephs I. an seine mutter, 1838-1872 [Letters from Emperor Franz Joseph I and his mother, 1838-1872] (in German). München: Verlag Josef Kösel & Friedrich Pustet. OCLC 6849428.
- McNaughton, Arnold (1973). The Book of Kings: A Royal Geneaology. Vol. 1–3. New York: Times Books. ISBN 978-0-8129-0280-8. OCLC 297851593 – via Internet Archive.
