= Archduke Franz Salvator of Austria =

Austrian archduke (1866–1939)

Archduke Franz Salvator
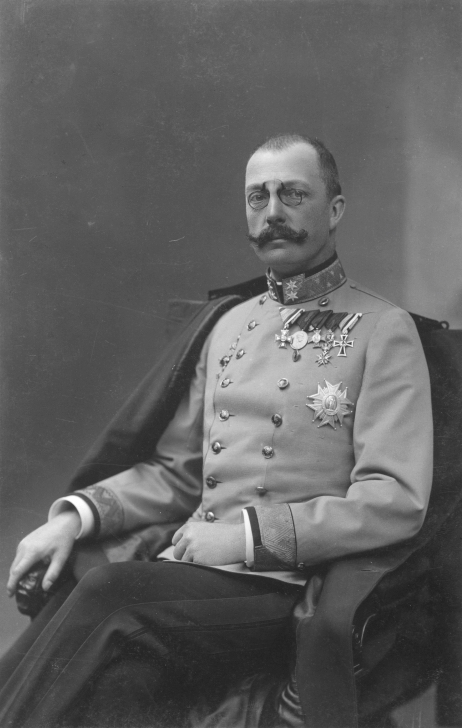
- Portrait by Carl Pietzner, c. 1905–1918
- Born: 21 August 1866; Altmünster, Austria
- Died: 20 April 1939 (aged 72); Vienna, Nazi Germany
- Spouse: Archduchess Marie Valerie of Austria (m. 1890; died 1924) Baroness Melanie von Riesenfels (m. 1934)
- Issue Detail: Elisabeth Franziska, Countess von Waldburg zu Zeil und Hohenems; Archduke Franz Karl; Archduke Hubert Salvator; Hedwig, Countess of Stolberg-Stolberg; Archduke Theodor Salvator; Gertrud, Countess von Waldburg zu Zeil und Hohenems; Archduchess Maria Elisabeth; Archduke Clemens Salvator; Archduchess Mathilde
Names
- German: Franz Salvator Maria Joseph Ferdinand Karl Leopold Anton von Padua Johann Baptist Januarius Aloys Gonzaga Rainer Benedikt Bernhard; Italian: Francesco Salvatore Maria Giuseppe Ferdinando Carlo Leopoldo Antonio di Padova Giovanni Battista Gennaro Lodovico Gonzaga Raniero Benedetto Bernardo
- House: Habsburg-Lorraine
- Father: Archduke Karl Salvator of Austria
- Mother: Princess Maria Immacolata of Bourbon-Two Sicilies

Archduke Franz Salvator of Austria (21 August 1866 – 20 April 1939) was the son of Archduke Karl Salvator of Austria and Princess Maria Immacolata of Bourbon-Two Sicilies. He married Archduchess Marie Valerie in 1890, though, due to Marie Valerie's death in 1924, remarried in 1934 to Baroness Melanie von Riesenfels.

During World War I, Franz Salvator received a doctorate in medicine for his work with the Red Cross.

== Early life and career ==
Franz Salvator was a son of Archduke Karl Salvator, Prince of Tuscany and Princess Maria Immaculata of Bourbon-Two-Sicilies. He became a cavalry general in the Imperial and Royal (k.u.k.) Austro-Hungarian Army. He received an honorary doctorate in medicine from the University of Innsbruck for his work with the Red Cross during World War I and was a Knight of the Order of the Golden Fleece and Order of the White Eagle.

== Family and children ==
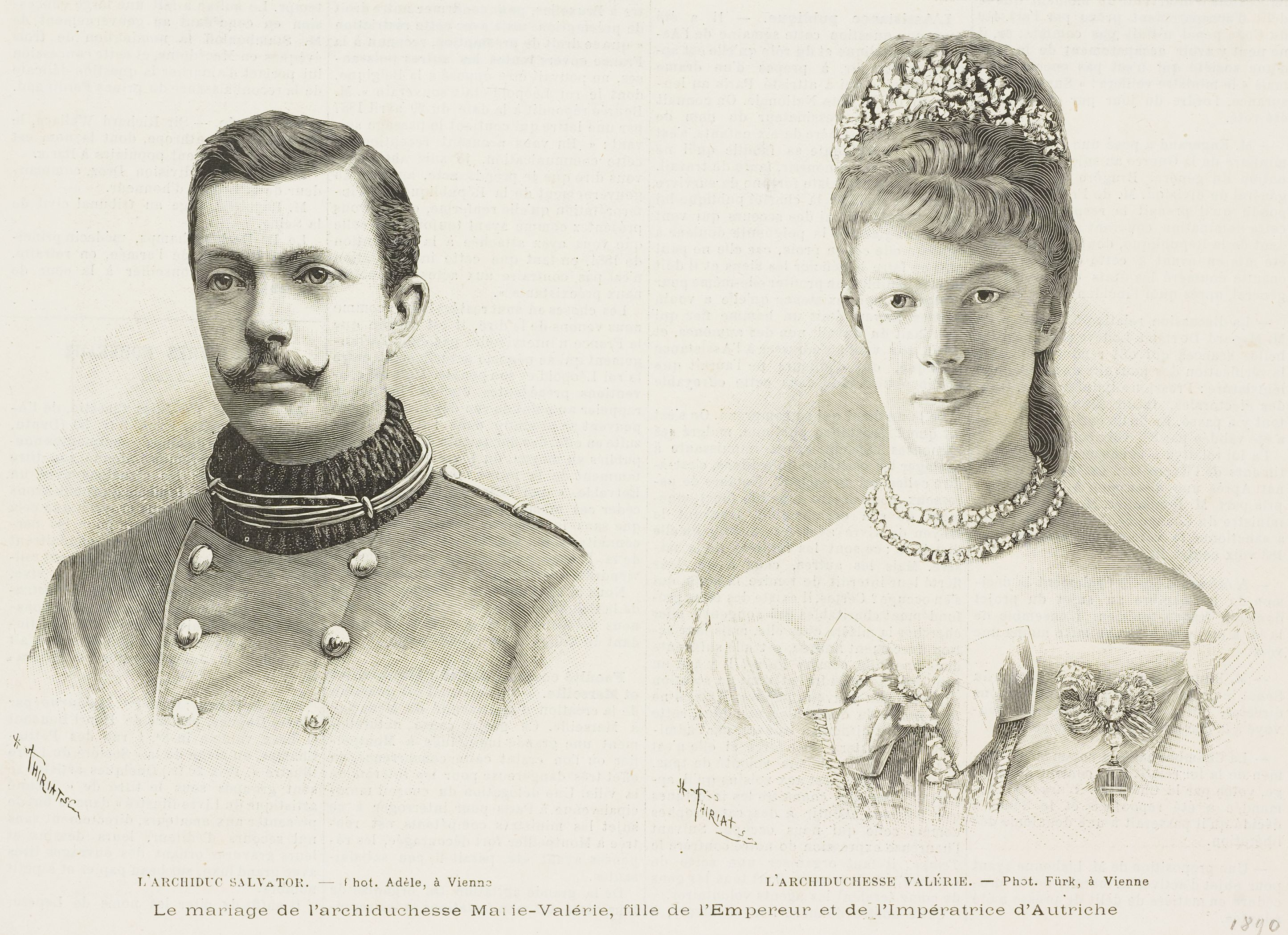
The marriage of Archduke Franz Salvator and Marie Valerie of Austria (Aelier Adèle, 1890)

Franz Salvator married first, in Ischl on 31 July 1890, to Archduchess Marie Valerie of Austria, daughter of Franz Joseph I of Austria and his wife, Duchess Elisabeth in Bavaria.

Their children were:

1. Elisabeth Franziska Marie Karoline Ignatia Salvator (27 January 1892 – 29 January 1930); married in 1912 to Count Georg von Waldburg zu Zeil und Hohenems, and had issue.
2. Archduke Franz Carl Salvator Marie Joseph Ignaz (17 February 1893 – 10 December 1918); died unmarried without issue.
3. Hubert Salvator Rainer Maria Joseph Ignatius (30 April 1894 – 24 March 1971); married on 25 November 1926 and religiously on 26 November 1926 to Princess Rosemary of Salm-Salm, and had issue.
4. Hedwig Maria Immakulata Michaela Ignatia Salvator (24 September 1896 – 1 November 1970); married in 1918 to Count Bernhard zu Stolberg-Stolberg, and had issue.
5. Theodor Salvator (9 October 1899 – 8 April 1978); married in 1926 to Countess Maria Theresa von Waldburg zu Zeil und Trauchburg, and had issue. Theodor Salvator and Maria Theresa are the maternal grandparents of Father Florian.
6. Gertrud Maria Gisela Elisabeth Ignatia (19 November 1900 – 20 December 1962); married in 1931 to Count Georg von Waldburg zu Zeil und Hohenems (Hohenems, and had issue.
7. Maria Elisabeth Therese Philomena Ignatia (19 November 1901 – 29 December 1936)
8. Clemens Salvator Leopold Benedikt Antonius Maria Joseph Ignatius (6 October 1904 – 20 August 1974); married in 1930 to Countess Elisabeth Rességuier de Miremont, and had issue.
9. Mathilde Maria Antonia Ignatia (9 August 1906 – 18 October 1991); married in 1947 to Ernst Hefel.
10. Agnes (26 June 1911 – 26 June 1911)

He married secondly, morganatically in Vienna on 28 April 1934, to Baroness Melanie Marie Agathe von Riesenfels. She was daughter of Philipp, Baron von Risenfels and Agathe, Baroness Redl von Rottenhausen und Rasztina.

Around 1914, he had an affair with Stephany Julienne Richter, a Hungarian national who was 25 years his junior. Pregnant with Franz Salvator's child, she persuaded Friedrich Franz von Hohenlohe-Waldenburg-Schillingsfürst, a German prince of the Hohenlohe family, that the baby was his. They married in London on 12 May 1914. Her son was born in Vienna on 5 December 1914, and named Franz Josef. According to an FBI memo of October 1941, the Hohenlohe family had some doubts about whether the child was theirs, but acknowledged him.

== Ancestry ==
Ancestors of Archduke Franz Salvator of Austria

8. Ferdinand III, Grand Duke of Tuscany
4. Leopold II, Grand Duke of Tuscany
9. Princess Luisa of Naples and Sicily
2. Archduke Karl Salvator of Austria
10. Francis I of the Two Sicilies
5. Princess Maria Antonia of the Two Sicilies
11. María Isabella of Spain
1. Archduke Franz Salvator of Austria
12. Francis I of the Two Sicilies (= 10)
6. Ferdinand II of the Two Sicilies
13. María Isabella of Spain (= 11)
3. Princess Maria Immacolata of Bourbon-Two Sicilies
14. Archduke Charles, Duke of Teschen
7. Maria Theresa of Austria
15. Princess Henrietta of Nassau-Weilburg
