= Archduke Franz Karl Salvator of Austria =

Austro-Tuscan imperial and royal

Archduke Franz Karl Salvator
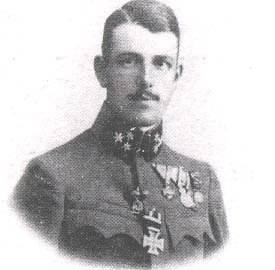
- Archduke Franz Karl Salvator Austria in uniform
- Born: 17 February 1893; Schloss Lichtenegg, Wels, Austria-Hungary
- Died: 10 December 1918 (aged 25); Wallsee-Sindelburg, Austria
- House: Habsburg-Lorraine
- Father: Archduke Franz Salvator of Austria
- Mother: Archduchess Marie Valerie of Austria

Archduke Franz Karl Salvator of Austria (German: Erzherzog Franz Karl Salvator Marie Joseph Ignaz von Österreich-Toskana) (17 February 1893 in Schloss Lichtenegg, Wels, Upper Austria, Austria-Hungary – 10 December 1918, Wallsee-Sindelburg, Lower Austria, Austria) was a member of the Tuscan line of the House of Habsburg-Lorraine and Archduke of Austria, Prince of Tuscany by birth. He died of the Spanish flu.

== Biography ==
Salvator was the eldest son of Archduke Franz Salvator of Austria, Prince of Tuscany and his wife Archduchess Marie Valerie of Austria. Through his mother, Franz Karl Salvator was a grandson of Emperor Franz Joseph I of Austria, and through his father, he was a great-grandson of Leopold II, Grand Duke of Tuscany.

Franz Karl left the military school as a first lieutenant. During the First World War, he served as a lieutenant from 1915 to 1918 in operations against Russia, Serbia and Romania. He lived to see the end of the war and the dissolution of Austria-Hungary in November 1918, but he was already very ill. Franz Karl died at Wallsee Castle on 10 December 1918, at the age of 25, of the Spanish flu, which had been around since the end of October. He was unmarried and had no children.

== Ancestry ==
Ancestors of Archduke Franz Karl Salvator of Austria

8. Leopold II, Grand Duke of Tuscany
4. Archduke Karl Salvator of Austria
9. Princess Maria Antonia of the Two Sicilies
2. Archduke Franz Salvator of Austria
10. Ferdinand II of the Two Sicilies
5. Princess Maria Immaculata of Bourbon-Two Sicilies
11. Archduchess Maria Theresa of Austria
1. Archduke Franz Karl Salvator of Austria
12. Archduke Franz Karl of Austria
6. Franz Joseph I of Austria
13. Princess Sophie of Bavaria
3. Archduchess Marie Valerie of Austria
14. Duke Maximilian Joseph in Bavaria
7. Duchess Elisabeth in Bavaria
15. Princess Ludovika of Bavaria

== Sources ==
- the article in the German Wikipedia, Franz Karl von Österreich-Toskana.
