= Emma Maria Harrington =

American suffragist

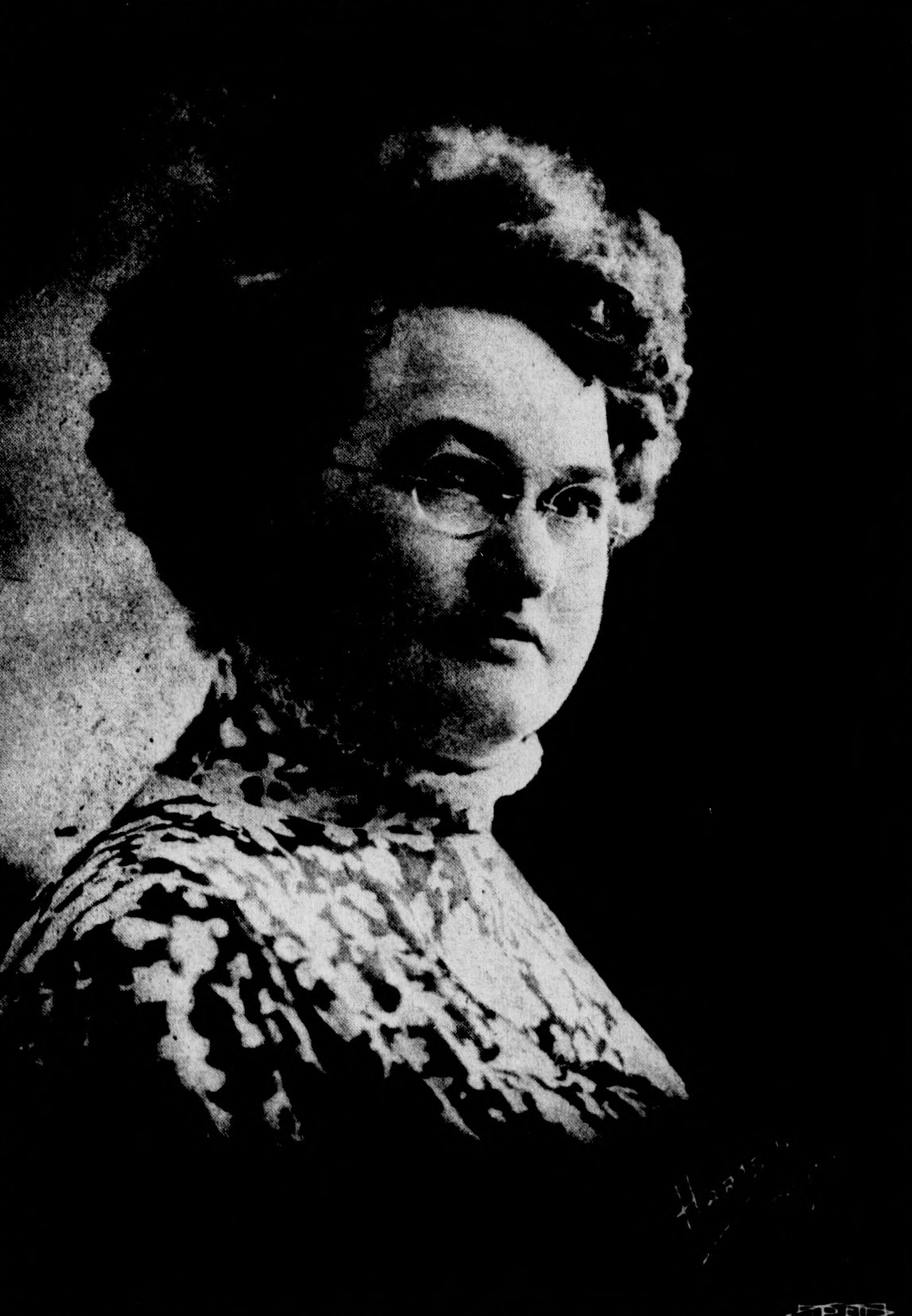
- Harrington c. 1918
- Born: Emma Maria Sternberger; 1881-1882; Denmark
- Occupation: Attorney
- Political party: Union Labor
- Spouse: Edward C. Harrington

Emma Maria Harrington (née Sternberger), commonly known as Mrs. E. C. Harrington, was an American attorney, labor and voting rights activist, and the first woman registered to vote in San Francisco. She was described by her contemporaries as “a brilliant speaker and organizer."

== Career ==
Born in Denmark to Jewish parents, she lived in Utah during her youth and earned a degree in psychology before moving to San Francisco. There, she served as the president of the San Francisco Workingwomen's Association and the San Francisco Women's Progressive Nonpartisan Organization. She was involved in political campaigns as well, organizing P. H. McCarthy Women's Clubs to support McCarthy's reelection run in 1911, as well as campaigning for William Howard Taft in 1912.

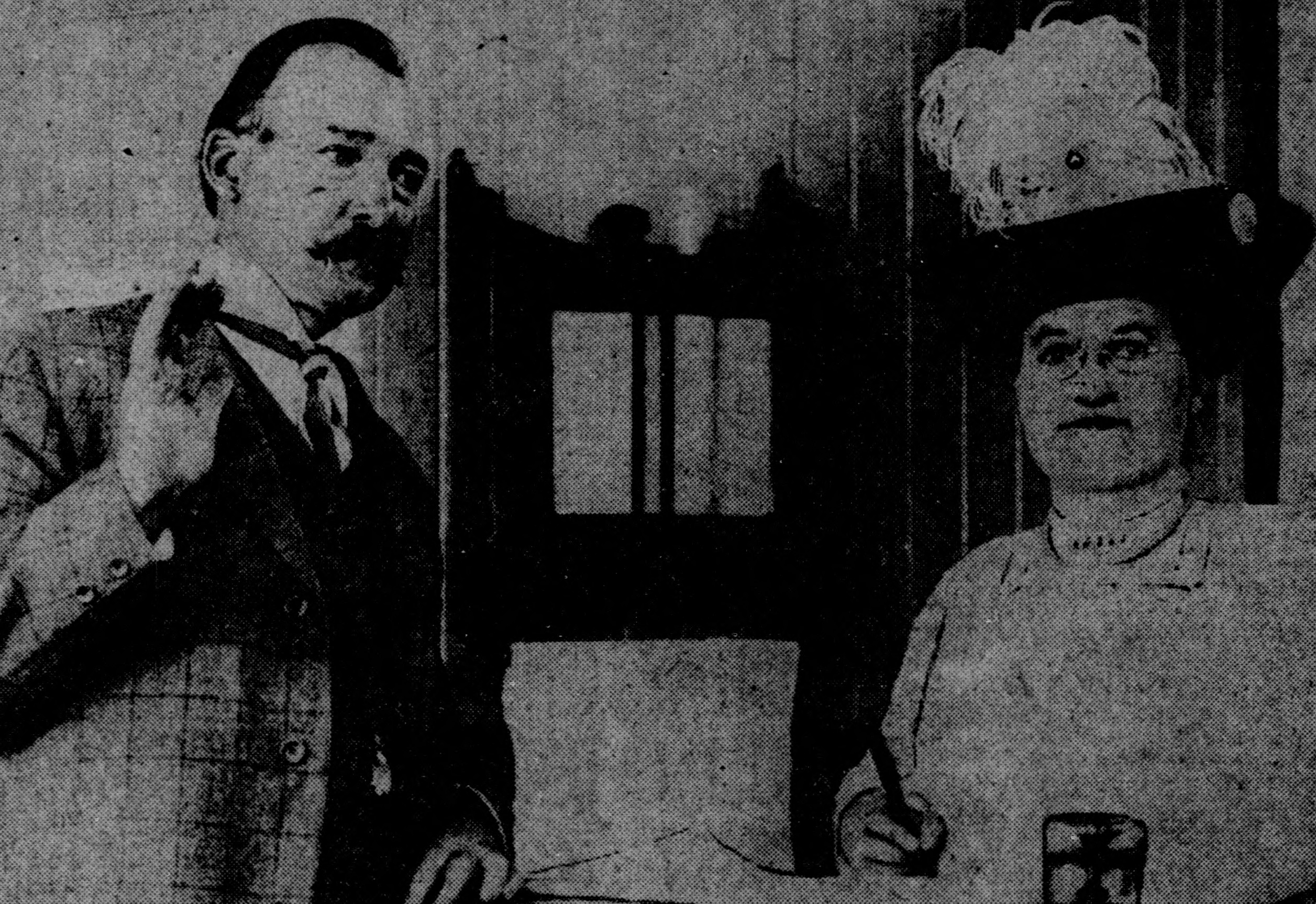
Mrs. Emma Maria Harrington taking the oath as the first woman to register in San Francisco. Her husband, the registrar, E. C. Harrington, is officiating. October 18, 1911.

On October 17, 1911, Harrington became the first woman registered to vote in San Francisco. At the time of her registration, she listed herself as a member of the Union Labor Party and her profession as "cashier in justice courts." Following her voter registration, she was said to "devote her energies to forming political organizations to fight in behalf of the labor cause." She also encouraged more women to register, assisting them at the registrar's office, registering female department store employees and posting announcements about registration deadlines in department store fitting rooms.

In 1914, she became eligible for the California Bar Association after successfully passing the qualifying exams, which required her to answer "over 80 quick-fire questions [...] whereas most candidates receive 20 or 30 questions." She subsequently opened her own office and "earned the distinction of being the first woman to represent a defendant in a murder trial - a case she won within one hour."

In 1918, she ran for the position of Justice of the Peace. Her campaign argued that as a woman, she should hear cases such as those involving “domestic relations,” in addition to advocating for “a night court session for working people.” Despite receiving 21,000 votes, she ultimately lost the election.

During the 1918 flu pandemic, when San Francisco reinstated its mask mandate after a spike in cases, she became the president of the newly formed San Francisco Anti-Mask League. In this role, she submitted a petition to the San Francisco Board of Supervisors calling for an end to the mask mandate. The following day, San Francisco mayor James Rolph announced that masks were no longer required.

In 1921, she ran for the San Francisco Board of Supervisors with the endorsement of the Taxpayers’ Association of San Francisco.
