= Archduchess Elisabeth Franziska of Austria (1892–1930) =

Archduchess Elisabeth Franziska
- Countess of Waldburg, of Zeil and Hohenems
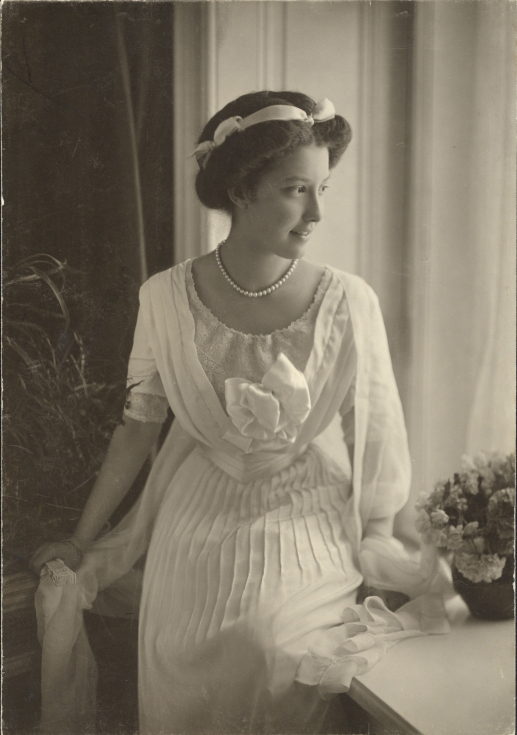
- Portrait by Carl Pietzner, 1914
- Born: 27 January 1892; Vienna, Austria-Hungary
- Died: 29 January 1930 (aged 38); Syrgenstein, Austria
- Spouse: Count Georg of Waldburg-Zeil-Hohenems (m. 1912)
- Issue: Countess Marie Valerie; Countess Klementine; Countess Elisabeth; Count Franz Josef
Names
- German: Elisabeth Franziska Marie Karoline Ignatia
- House: Habsburg-Lorraine
- Father: Archduke Franz Salvator of Austria
- Mother: Archduchess Marie Valerie of Austria

Archduchess Elisabeth Franziska of Austria (Elisabeth Franziska Marie Karoline Ignatia Salvator; 27 January 1892 – 29 January 1930) was the eldest daughter of Archduke Franz Salvator of Austria and Archduchess Marie Valerie of Austria. Through her mother, she was a granddaughter of Emperor Franz Joseph I of Austria and through her father, she was a descendant of King George II of Great Britain.

== Biography ==
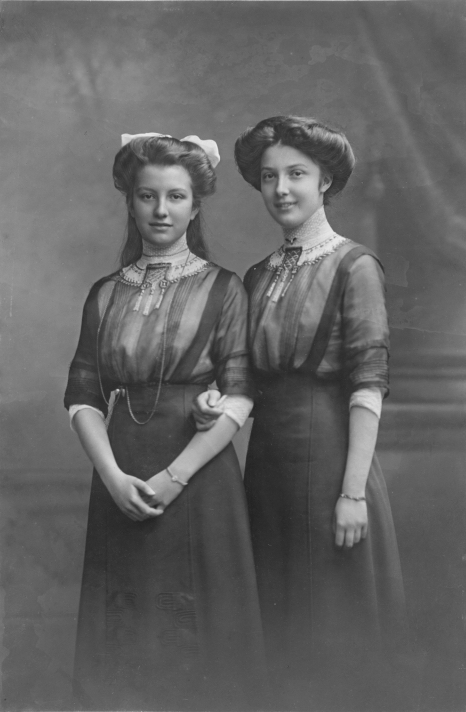
Photograph of Elisabeth Franziska and her sister Archduchess Hedwig, 1912

She was born in Vienna on 27 January 1892 to Archduke Franz Salvator of Austria and his wife, Archduchess Marie Valerie, youngest daughter of Emperor Franz Joseph I of Austria. She married at Niederwallsee on 19 September 1912 Georg Count von Waldburg zu Zeil und Hohenems (1878–1955). The marriage was one of love and not a political marriage. Georg von Waldburg had no money or property, and had been hired as a tutor for her brothers.

They had four children, three daughters and a son:

- Countess Marie Valerie von Waldburg-Zeil (28 June 1913 – 8 July 2011), married Archduke Georg of Austria, Prince of Tuscany (1905–1952) in 1936. He was the younger son of Archduke Peter Ferdinand of Austria and his wife, Princess Maria Cristina of Bourbon-Two Sicilies.
- Countess Klementine von Waldburg-Zeil (5 October 1914 – 24 September 1941), unmarried and without issue.
- Countess Elisabeth von Waldburg-Zeil (23 February 1917 – 18 June 1979), unmarried and without issue.
- Count Franz Josef von Waldburg-Zeil (7 March 1927 – 31 August 2022), married Countess Priscilla of Schönborn-Wiesentheid in 1956. They had seven children.

Archduchess Elisabeth Franziska was a painter for some time. She died, aged 38, of pneumonia on 29 January 1930. Her widower remarried nearly two years later, on 29 December 1931, to her younger sister Gertrud.

== Ancestry ==
Ancestors of Archduchess Elisabeth Franziska of Austria (1892–1930)

8. Leopold II, Grand Duke of Tuscany
4. Archduke Karl Salvator of Austria
9. Princess Maria Antonia of the Two Sicilies
2. Archduke Franz Salvator of Austria
10. Ferdinand II of the Two Sicilies
5. Princess Maria Immacolata of Bourbon-Two Sicilies
11. Archduchess Maria Theresa of Austria
1. Archduchess Elisabeth Franziska of Austria
12. Archduke Franz Karl of Austria
6. Franz Joseph I of Austria
13. Princess Sophie of Bavaria
3. Archduchess Marie Valerie of Austria
14. Duke Maximilian Joseph in Bavaria
7. Duchess Elisabeth in Bavaria
15. Princess Ludovika of Bavaria
