= Bibliography of the history of the 1918 influenza pandemic =

Bibliography of the 1918 influenza pandemic
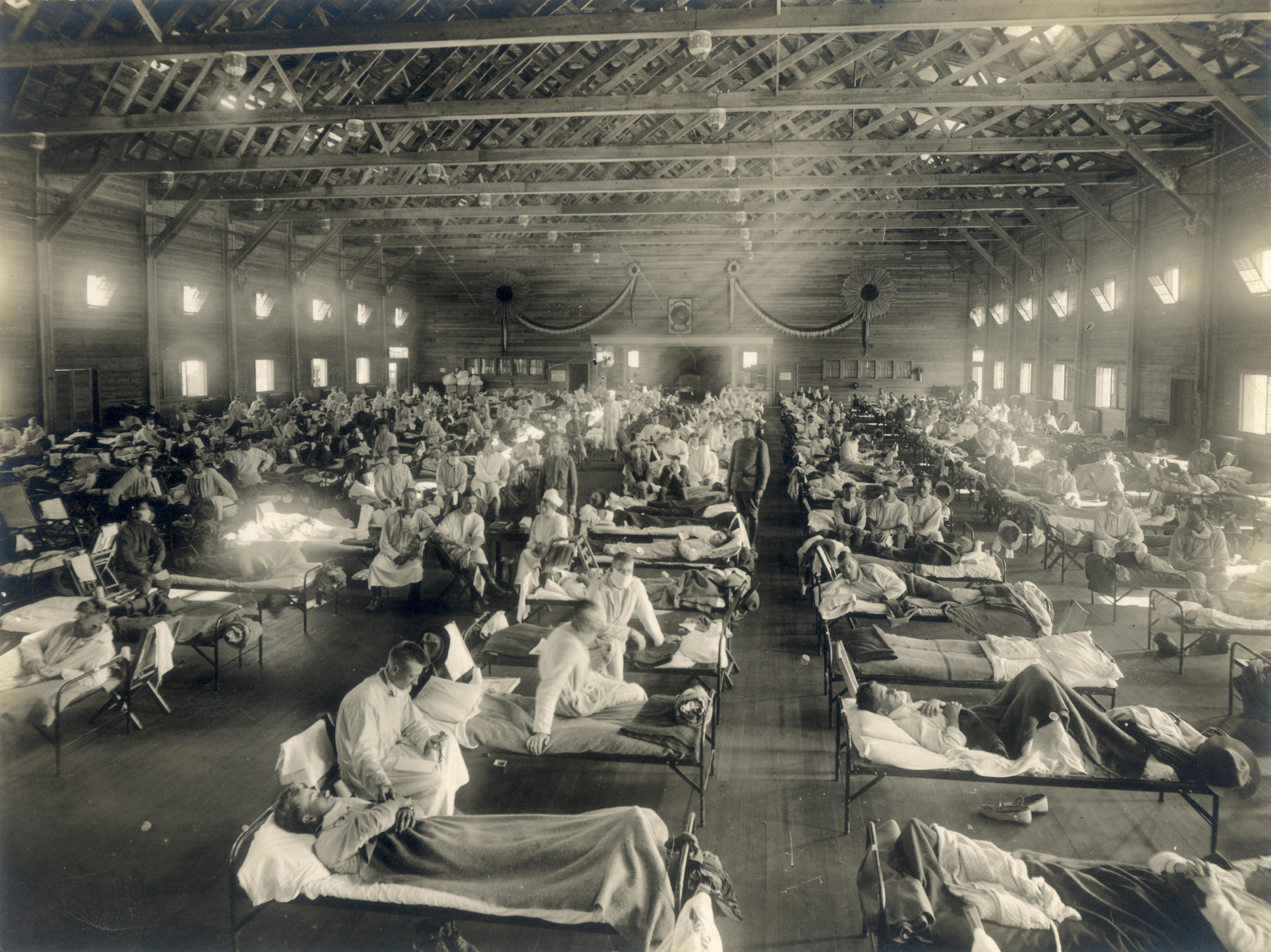
- Emergency hospital at Camp Funston, Kansas, during the 1918 epidemic, National Museum of Health and Medicine
- Subject: History of the 1918–1920 influenza pandemic
- Chronological scope: 1918–1920, with its aftermath and later scientific study
- Geographic scope: Worldwide
- Language: English-language scholarship
- Arrangement: General histories; war and the military; national and regional; public health and medicine; society, demography and culture
- Citation style: APA 7

The 1918 influenza pandemic
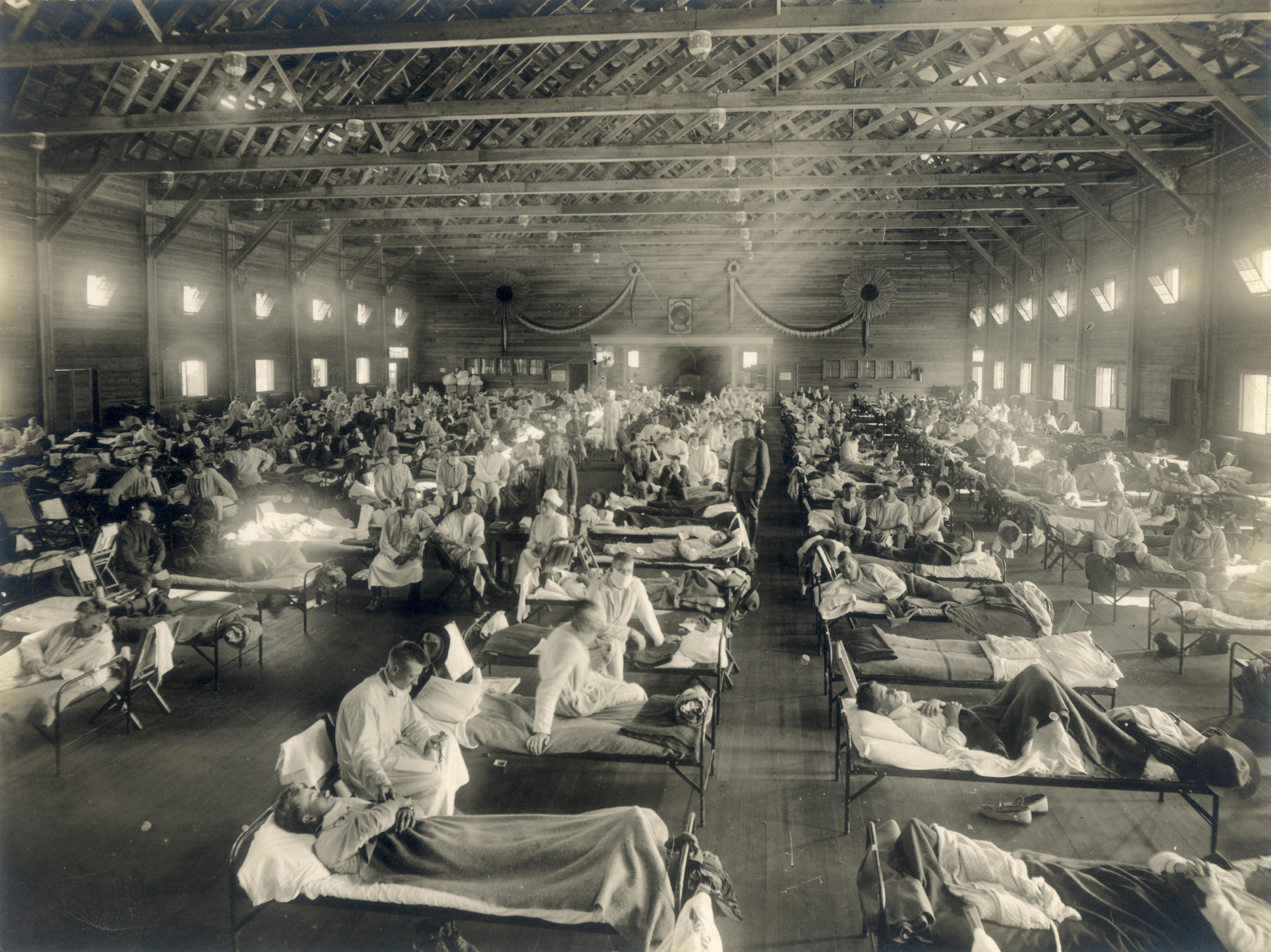
- Soldiers sick with Spanish flu at a hospital ward at Camp Funston in Fort Riley, Kansas
- Disease: Influenza
- Pathogen: Strains of A/H1N1
- Location: Worldwide
- Index case: Haskell County, Kansas; January 1918 (Note: The virus may have been circulating in Europe since late 1915.)
- Date: February 1918 – April 1920; 106 years ago
- Suspected cases: 500 million (estimated)
- Deaths: 25–50 million (generally accepted), other estimates range from 17 to 100 million

This is a bibliography of works about the history of the 1918 influenza pandemic. This bibliography is limited to history and excludes other disciplines unless they contain a substantial amount of history.

The 1918–1920 flu pandemic, also known as the Great Influenza epidemic or by the misleading name Spanish flu, was an exceptionally deadly global influenza pandemic caused by the H1N1 subtype of the influenza A virus. The earliest probable cases were recorded in March 1918 in Haskell County, Kansas, United States, and further cases followed in April in France, Germany and the United Kingdom. By 1920, about 500 million people, nearly a third of the world's population, had been infected. Death toll estimates range from 17 million to 50 million and may be as high as 100 million, making it one of the deadliest pandemics in history.

Bibliography contains academic level English language books (including translations) and journal articles, published mainly post World War II. (Note: Works published before World War II should be limited to areas where there is no significant post World War II books on the subject or when the work in question has significant historical merit.) Book entries may have references to reviews published in academic journals or major newspapers when these could be considered helpful. These reference reviews also function as a resource to find other works on this subject.

Works listed here are cited in the notes or bibliographies of scholarly sources. Each is published by an academic or major trade press, written by a recognized expert, or substantially reviewed in scholarly journals; borderline cases are omitted. A selection of primary sources are included. Many of the books below carry their own bibliographies; see Further reading section for longer ones, and External links section for historical sites and museums.

Citations follow APA style. (Note: Entries are in plain text APA 7 format without templates; templates are used only for reviews and notes.) Books have citations to academic journal or mainstream published reviews when available. For books only partly about the subject, relevant chapter or section titles are provided when useful and available. Translators of the original-language edition are included when possible. In cases where a title or name has appeared with more than one English spelling, the most recent published form is used and a footnote documents any earlier title under which the work appeared.

== General histories ==
- Arnold, C. (2018). Pandemic 1918: Eyewitness accounts from the greatest medical holocaust in modern history. St. Martin's Press.
- Barry, J. M. (2004). The great influenza: The epic story of the deadliest plague in history. Viking.
- Brown, J. (2018). Influenza: The hundred-year hunt to cure the deadliest disease in history. Atria Books.
- Chandra, S., Christensen, J., & Likhtman, S. (2020). Connectivity and seasonality: The 1918 influenza and COVID-19 pandemics in global perspective. Journal of Global History, 15(3), 408–420. doi:10.1017/S1740022820000261
- Collier, R. (1974). The plague of the Spanish lady: The influenza pandemic of 1918–1919. Atheneum.
- Crosby, A. W. (2003). America's forgotten pandemic: The influenza of 1918 (2nd ed.). Cambridge University Press. doi:10.1017/CBO9780511586576 (Note: First published as Epidemic and peace, 1918 (Greenwood Press, 1976).)
- Honigsbaum, M. (2018). Spanish influenza redux: Revisiting the mother of all pandemics. The Lancet, 391(10139), 2492–2495. doi:10.1016/S0140-6736(18)31360-6
- Honigsbaum, M. (2019). The pandemic century: One hundred years of panic, hysteria, and hubris. W. W. Norton.
- Johnson, N. P. A. S., & Mueller, J. (2002). Updating the accounts: Global mortality of the 1918–1920 "Spanish" influenza pandemic. Bulletin of the History of Medicine, 76(1), 105–115. doi:10.1353/bhm.2002.0022
- Kent, S. K. (2013). The influenza pandemic of 1918–1919: A brief history with documents. Bedford/St. Martin's.
- Kolata, G. (1999). Flu: The story of the great influenza pandemic of 1918 and the search for the virus that caused it. Farrar, Straus and Giroux.
- Morens, D. M., & Fauci, A. S. (2007). The 1918 influenza pandemic: Insights for the 21st century. The Journal of Infectious Diseases, 195(7), 1018–1028. doi:10.1086/511989
- Morens, D. M., Taubenberger, J. K., & Fauci, A. S. (2009). The persistent legacy of the 1918 influenza virus. New England Journal of Medicine, 361(3), 225–229. doi:10.1056/NEJMp0904819
- Murray, C. J., Lopez, A. D., Chin, B., Feehan, D., & Hill, K. H. (2006). Estimation of potential global pandemic influenza mortality on the basis of vital registry data from the 1918–20 pandemic: A quantitative analysis. The Lancet, 368(9554), 2211–2218. doi:10.1016/S0140-6736(06)69895-4
- Patterson, K. D., & Pyle, G. F. (1991). The geography and mortality of the 1918 influenza pandemic. Bulletin of the History of Medicine, 65(1), 4–21.
- Phillips, H., & Killingray, D. (Eds.). (2003). The Spanish influenza pandemic of 1918–19: New perspectives. Routledge.
- Potter, C. (2001). A history of influenza. Journal of Applied Microbiology, 91(4), 572–579. doi:10.1046/j.1365-2672.2001.01492.x
- Radusin, M. (2012). The Spanish flu – Part I: The first wave. Vojnosanitetski Pregled, 69(9), 812–817.
- Radusin, M. (2012). The Spanish flu – Part II: The second and third wave. Vojnosanitetski Pregled, 69(10), 917–927.
- Saunders-Hastings, P., & Krewski, D. (2016). Reviewing the history of pandemic influenza: Understanding patterns of emergence and transmission. Pathogens, 5(4), 66. doi:10.3390/pathogens5040066
- Spinney, L. (2017). Pale rider: The Spanish flu of 1918 and how it changed the world. PublicAffairs.
- Spreeuwenberg, P., Kroneman, M., & Paget, J. (2018). Reassessing the global mortality burden of the 1918 influenza pandemic. American Journal of Epidemiology, 187(12), 2561–2567. doi:10.1093/aje/kwy191
- Taubenberger, J. K., & Morens, D. M. (2006). 1918 influenza: The mother of all pandemics. Emerging Infectious Diseases, 12(1), 15–22. doi:10.3201/eid1209.05-0979

== World War I and the military ==
- Barry, J. M. (2004). The site of origin of the 1918 influenza pandemic and its public health implications. Journal of Translational Medicine, 2(1), 3. doi:10.1186/1479-5876-2-3
- Byerly, C. R. (2005). Fever of war: The influenza epidemic in the U.S. Army during World War I. New York University Press.
- Byerly, C. R. (2010). The U.S. military and the influenza pandemic of 1918–1919. Public Health Reports, 125(Suppl. 3), 81–91. doi:10.1177/00333549101250S311
- Cox, J., Gill, D., Cox, F., & Worobey, M. (2019). Purulent bronchitis in 1917 and pandemic influenza in 1918. The Lancet Infectious Diseases, 19(4), 360–361. doi:10.1016/S1473-3099(19)30114-8
- Flecknoe, D., Charles Wakefield, B., & Simmons, A. (2018). Plagues & wars: The "Spanish flu" pandemic as a lesson from history. Medicine, Conflict and Survival, 34(2), 61–68. doi:10.1080/13623699.2018.1472892
- Humphries, M. O. (2014). Paths of infection: The First World War and the origins of the 1918 influenza pandemic. War in History, 21(1), 55–81. doi:10.1177/0968344513504525
- Langford, C. (2005). Did the 1918–19 influenza pandemic originate in China? Population and Development Review, 31(3), 473–505. doi:10.1111/j.1728-4457.2005.00080.x
- More, A. F., Loveluck, C. P., Clifford, H., Handley, M. J., Korotkikh, E. V., Kurbatov, A. V., McCormick, M., & Mayewski, P. A. (2020). The impact of a six-year climate anomaly on the "Spanish flu" pandemic and WWI. GeoHealth, 4(9). doi:10.1029/2020GH000277
- Oxford, J., Sefton, A., Jackson, R., Innes, W., Daniels, R., & Johnson, N. (2002). World War I may have allowed the emergence of "Spanish" influenza. The Lancet Infectious Diseases, 2(2), 111–114. doi:10.1016/S1473-3099(02)00185-8
- Oxford, J. S. (2001). The so-called Great Spanish Influenza Pandemic of 1918 may have originated in France in 1916. Philosophical Transactions of the Royal Society of London. Series B: Biological Sciences, 356(1416), 1857–1859. doi:10.1098/rstb.2001.1012
- Oxford, J. S., Lambkin, R., Sefton, A., Daniels, R., Elliot, A., Brown, R., & Gill, D. (2005). A hypothesis: The conjunction of soldiers, gas, pigs, ducks, geese and horses in Northern France during the Great War provided the conditions for the emergence of the "Spanish" influenza pandemic of 1918–1919. Vaccine, 23(7), 940–945. doi:10.1016/j.vaccine.2004.06.035
- Oxford, J. S., & Gill, D. (2019). A possible European origin of the Spanish influenza and the first attempts to reduce mortality to combat superinfecting bacteria: An opinion from a virologist and a military historian. Human Vaccines & Immunotherapeutics, 15(9), 2009–2012. doi:10.1080/21645515.2019.1607711
- Price-Smith, A. T. (2009). Contagion and chaos: Disease, ecology, and national security in the era of globalization. MIT Press. doi:10.7551/mitpress/7390.001.0001
- Shanks, G. D., & Brundage, J. F. (2012). Pathogenic responses among young adults during the 1918 influenza pandemic. Emerging Infectious Diseases, 18(2), 201–207. doi:10.3201/eid1802.102042
- Shanks, G. D., Mackenzie, A., Waller, M., & Brundage, J. F. (2012). Relationship between "purulent bronchitis" in military populations in Europe prior to 1918 and the 1918–1919 influenza pandemic. Influenza and Other Respiratory Viruses, 6(4), 235–239. doi:10.1111/j.1750-2659.2011.00309.x
- Shanks, G. D. (2016). No evidence of 1918 influenza pandemic origin in Chinese laborers/soldiers in France. Journal of the Chinese Medical Association, 79(1), 46–48. doi:10.1016/j.jcma.2015.08.009
- Worobey, M., Cox, J., & Gill, D. (2019). The origins of the great pandemic. Evolution, Medicine, and Public Health, 2019(1), 18–25. doi:10.1093/emph/eoz001

== National and regional studies ==
- Afkhami, A. (2003). Compromised constitutions: The Iranian experience with the 1918 influenza pandemic. Bulletin of the History of Medicine, 77(2), 367–392. doi:10.1353/bhm.2003.0049
- Ansart, S., Pelat, C., Boelle, P.-Y., Carrat, F., Flahault, A., & Valleron, A.-J. (2009). Mortality burden of the 1918–1919 influenza pandemic in Europe. Influenza and Other Respiratory Viruses, 3(3), 99–106. doi:10.1111/j.1750-2659.2009.00080.x
- Arnold, D. (2019). Death and the modern empire: The 1918–19 influenza epidemic in India. Transactions of the Royal Historical Society, 29, 181–200. doi:10.1017/S0080440119000082
- Bristow, N. K. (2012). American pandemic: The lost worlds of the 1918 influenza epidemic. Oxford University Press.
- Chandra, S., Kuljanin, G., & Wray, J. (2012). Mortality from the influenza pandemic of 1918–1919: The case of India. Demography, 49(3), 857–865. doi:10.1007/s13524-012-0116-x
- Chandra, S., Christensen, J., Chandra, M., & Paneth, N. (2021). Pandemic reemergence and four waves of excess mortality coinciding with the 1918 influenza pandemic in Michigan: Insights for COVID-19. American Journal of Public Health, 111(3), 430–437. doi:10.2105/AJPH.2020.305969
- Cheng, K., & Leung, P. (2007). What happened in China during the 1918 influenza pandemic? International Journal of Infectious Diseases, 11(4), 360–364. doi:10.1016/j.ijid.2006.07.009
- Chowell, G., Viboud, C., Simonsen, L., Miller, M., Hurtado, J., Soto, G., Vargas, R., Guzman, M., Ulloa, M., & Munayco, C. (2011). The 1918–1920 influenza pandemic in Peru. Vaccine, 29(Suppl. 2), B21–B26. doi:10.1016/j.vaccine.2011.02.048
- Chowell, G., Simonsen, L., Flores, J., Miller, M. A., & Viboud, C. (2014). Death patterns during the 1918 influenza pandemic in Chile. Emerging Infectious Diseases, 20(11), 1803–1811. doi:10.3201/eid2011.130632
- Chowell, G., Erkoreka, A., Viboud, C., & Echeverri-Dávila, B. (2014). Spatial-temporal excess mortality patterns of the 1918–1919 influenza pandemic in Spain. BMC Infectious Diseases, 14(1), 371. doi:10.1186/1471-2334-14-371
- Cimino, E. C. (2023). The supervisors are carrying the bag: The Nurses' Emergency Council, settlement houses, and the 1918 influenza pandemic in New York City. New York History, 104(2), 296–314. doi:10.1353/nyh.2023.a918265
- Cristina, J., Pollero, R., & Pellegrino, A. (2019). The 1918 influenza pandemic in Montevideo: The southernmost capital city in the Americas. Influenza and Other Respiratory Viruses, 13(3), 219–225. doi:10.1111/irv.12619
- Curson, P., & McCracken, K. (2006). An Australian perspective of the 1918–1919 influenza pandemic. New South Wales Public Health Bulletin, 17(8), 103–107. doi:10.1071/NB06025
- Erkoreka, A. (2010). The Spanish influenza pandemic in occidental Europe (1918–1920) and victim age. Influenza and Other Respiratory Viruses, 4(2), 81–89. doi:10.1111/j.1750-2659.2009.00125.x
- Fanning, P. J. (2010). Influenza and inequality: One town's tragic response to the great epidemic of 1918. University of Massachusetts Press.
- Grabowski, M. L., Kosińska, B., Knap, J. P., & Brydak, L. B. (2017). The lethal Spanish influenza pandemic in Poland. Medical Science Monitor, 23, 4880–4884. doi:10.12659/MSM.906280
- He, D., Dushoff, J., Day, T., Ma, J., & Earn, D. J. D. (2013). Inferring the causes of the three waves of the 1918 influenza pandemic in England and Wales. Proceedings of the Royal Society B: Biological Sciences, 280(1766), 20131345. doi:10.1098/rspb.2013.1345
- Ho, P., & Chow, K. (2009). Mortality burden of the 1918–1920 influenza pandemic in Hong Kong. Influenza and Other Respiratory Viruses, 3(6), 261–263. doi:10.1111/j.1750-2659.2009.00105.x
- Holbrook, C. (2022). Public health in a federation: Lessons from the Spanish influenza in Australia. Social History of Medicine, 35(3), 818–846. doi:10.1093/shm/hkac005
- Honigsbaum, M. (2009). Living with Enza: The forgotten story of Britain and the great flu pandemic of 1918. Palgrave Macmillan. doi:10.1007/978-0-230-23921-0
- Hsieh, Y.-H. (2009). Excess deaths and immunoprotection during 1918–1920 influenza pandemic, Taiwan. Emerging Infectious Diseases, 15(10), 1617–1619. doi:10.3201/eid1510.080811
- Humphries, M. O. (2013). The last plague: Spanish influenza and the politics of public health in Canada. University of Toronto Press.
- Johnson, N. (2006). Britain and the 1918–19 influenza pandemic: A dark epilogue. Routledge. doi:10.4324/9780203018163
- Johnson, N. P. (2004). Scottish 'flu: The Scottish experience of "Spanish flu". The Scottish Historical Review, 83(2), 216–226. doi:10.3366/shr.2004.83.2.216
- Jones, E. W. (2007). Influenza 1918: Disease, death, and struggle in Winnipeg. University of Toronto Press.
- Killingray, D. (1994). The influenza pandemic of 1918–1919 in the British Caribbean. Social History of Medicine, 7(1), 59–87. doi:10.1093/shm/7.1.59
- Mills, I. D. (1986). The 1918–1919 influenza pandemic: The Indian experience. The Indian Economic & Social History Review, 23(1), 1–40. doi:10.1177/001946468602300102
- Nunes, B., Silva, S., Rodrigues, A., Roquette, R., Batista, I., & Rebelo-de-Andrade, H. (2018). The 1918–1919 influenza pandemic in Portugal: A regional analysis of death impact. American Journal of Epidemiology, 187(12), 2541–2549. doi:10.1093/aje/kwy164
- Pearce, D. C., Pallaghy, P. K., McCaw, J. M., McVernon, J., & Mathews, J. D. (2011). Understanding mortality in the 1918–1919 influenza pandemic in England and Wales. Influenza and Other Respiratory Viruses, 5(2), 89–98. doi:10.1111/j.1750-2659.2010.00186.x
- Pettit, D. A., & Bailie, J. (2008). A cruel wind: Pandemic flu in America, 1918–1920. Timberlane Books.
- Phillips, H. (1990). "Black October": The impact of the Spanish influenza epidemic of 1918 on South Africa. University of Cape Town.
- Porras-Gallo, M.-I., & Davis, R. A. (Eds.). (2014). The Spanish influenza pandemic of 1918–1919: Perspectives from the Iberian Peninsula and the Americas. University of Rochester Press. doi:10.1515/9781580468640
- Rice, G. W. (2005). Black November: The 1918 influenza pandemic in New Zealand (2nd ed.). Canterbury University Press.
- Richard, S. A., Sugaya, N., Simonsen, L., Miller, M. A., & Viboud, C. (2009). A comparative study of the 1918–1920 influenza pandemic in Japan, USA and UK: Mortality impact and implications for pandemic planning. Epidemiology and Infection, 137(8), 1062–1072. doi:10.1017/S0950268809002088
- Shanks, G. D., & Brundage, J. F. (2013). Pacific islands which escaped the 1918–1919 influenza pandemic and their subsequent mortality experiences. Epidemiology and Infection, 141(2), 353–356. doi:10.1017/S0950268812000866
- Trilla, A., Trilla, G., & Daer, C. (2008). The 1918 "Spanish flu" in Spain. Clinical Infectious Diseases, 47(5), 668–673. doi:10.1086/590567
- Tuckel, P., Sassler, S., Maisel, R., & Leykam, A. (2006). The diffusion of the influenza pandemic of 1918 in Hartford, Connecticut. Social Science History, 30(2), 167–196. doi:10.1215/01455532-30-2-167
- Yang, W., Petkova, E., & Shaman, J. (2014). The 1918 influenza pandemic in New York City: Age-specific timing, mortality, and transmission dynamics. Influenza and Other Respiratory Viruses, 8(2), 177–188. doi:10.1111/irv.12217

== Society and public health ==
- Almond, D. (2006). Is the 1918 influenza pandemic over? Long-term effects of in utero influenza exposure in the post-1940 U.S. population. Journal of Political Economy, 114(4), 672–712. doi:10.1086/507154
- Antonovics, J., Hood, M. E., & Baker, C. H. (2006). Was the 1918 flu avian in origin? Nature, 440(7088), E9. doi:10.1038/nature04824
- Bootsma, M. C. J., & Ferguson, N. M. (2007). The effect of public health measures on the 1918 influenza pandemic in U.S. cities. Proceedings of the National Academy of Sciences, 104(18), 7588–7593. doi:10.1073/pnas.0611071104
- dos Reis, M., Hay, A. J., & Goldstein, R. A. (2009). Using non-homogeneous models of nucleotide substitution to identify host shift events: Application to the origin of the 1918 "Spanish" influenza pandemic virus. Journal of Molecular Evolution, 69(4), 333–345. doi:10.1007/s00239-009-9282-x
- Duncan, K. (2003). Hunting the 1918 flu: One scientist's search for a killer virus. University of Toronto Press.
- Gagnon, A., Miller, M. S., Hallman, S. A., Bourbeau, R., Herring, D. A., Earn, D. J., & Madrenas, J. (2013). Age-specific mortality during the 1918 influenza pandemic: Unravelling the mystery of high young adult mortality. PLOS ONE, 8(8), e69586. doi:10.1371/journal.pone.0069586
- Hatchett, R. J., Mecher, C. E., & Lipsitch, M. (2007). Public health interventions and epidemic intensity during the 1918 influenza pandemic. Proceedings of the National Academy of Sciences, 104(18), 7582–7587. doi:10.1073/pnas.0610941104
- He, D., Dushoff, J., Day, T., Ma, J., & Earn, D. J. D. (2011). Mechanistic modelling of the three waves of the 1918 influenza pandemic. Theoretical Ecology, 4(2), 283–288. doi:10.1007/s12080-011-0123-3
- Hoppe, T. (2018). "Spanish flu": When infectious disease names blur origins and stigmatize those infected. American Journal of Public Health, 108(11), 1462–1464. doi:10.2105/AJPH.2018.304645
- Mamelund, S.-E. (2006). A socially neutral disease? Individual social class, household wealth and mortality from Spanish influenza in two socially contrasting parishes in Kristiania 1918–19. Social Science & Medicine, 62(4), 923–940. doi:10.1016/j.socscimed.2005.06.051
- Markel, H., Lipman, H. B., Navarro, J. A., Sloan, A., Michalsen, J. R., Stern, A. M., & Cetron, M. S. (2007). Nonpharmaceutical interventions implemented by US cities during the 1918–1919 influenza pandemic. JAMA, 298(6), 644–654. doi:10.1001/jama.298.6.644
- Mills, C. E., Robins, J. M., & Lipsitch, M. (2004). Transmissibility of 1918 pandemic influenza. Nature, 432(7019), 904–906. doi:10.1038/nature03063
- Morens, D. M., Taubenberger, J. K., & Fauci, A. S. (2008). Predominant role of bacterial pneumonia as a cause of death in pandemic influenza: Implications for pandemic influenza preparedness. The Journal of Infectious Diseases, 198(7), 962–970. doi:10.1086/591708
- Morris, D. E., Cleary, D. W., & Clarke, S. C. (2017). Secondary bacterial infections associated with influenza pandemics. Frontiers in Microbiology, 8, 1041. doi:10.3389/fmicb.2017.01041
- Noymer, A., & Garenne, M. (2000). The 1918 influenza epidemic's effects on sex differentials in mortality in the United States. Population and Development Review, 26(3), 565–581. doi:10.1111/j.1728-4457.2000.00565.x
- Outka, E. (2019). Viral modernism: The influenza pandemic and interwar literature. Columbia University Press.
- Phillips, H. (2020). '17, '18, '19: Religion and science in three pandemics, 1817, 1918, and 2019. Journal of Global History, 15(3), 434–443. doi:10.1017/S1740022820000315
- Segrave, K. (2024). Masking America, 1918–1919: Efforts to control the great influenza pandemic. McFarland & Company.
- Simonsen, L., Clarke, M. J., Schonberger, L. B., Arden, N. H., Cox, N. J., & Fukuda, K. (1998). Pandemic versus epidemic influenza mortality: A pattern of changing age distribution. The Journal of Infectious Diseases, 178(1), 53–60. doi:10.1086/515616
- Starko, K. M. (2009). Salicylates and pandemic influenza mortality, 1918–1919: Pharmacology, pathology, and historic evidence. Clinical Infectious Diseases, 49(9), 1405–1410. doi:10.1086/606060
- Taubenberger, J. K., Reid, A. H., Janczewski, T. A., & Fanning, T. G. (2001). Integrating historical, clinical and molecular genetic data in order to explain the origin and virulence of the 1918 Spanish influenza virus. Philosophical Transactions of the Royal Society of London. Series B: Biological Sciences, 356(1416), 1829–1839. doi:10.1098/rstb.2001.1020
- Taubenberger, J. K., & Morens, D. M. (2010). Influenza: The once and future pandemic. Public Health Reports, 125(Suppl. 3), 15–26. doi:10.1177/00333549101250S305
- Taubenberger, J. K., Baltimore, D., Doherty, P. C., Markel, H., Morens, D. M., Webster, R. G., & Wilson, I. A. (2012). Reconstruction of the 1918 influenza virus: Unexpected rewards from the past. mBio, 3(5), e00201-12. doi:10.1128/mBio.00201-12
- Tognotti, E. (2003). Scientific triumphalism and learning from facts: Bacteriology and the "Spanish flu" challenge of 1918. Social History of Medicine, 16(1), 97–110. doi:10.1093/shm/16.1.97
- Tomkins, S. M. (1992). The failure of expertise: Public health policy in Britain during the 1918–19 influenza epidemic. Social History of Medicine, 5(3), 435–454. doi:10.1093/shm/5.3.435
- Tumpey, T. M., Basler, C. F., Aguilar, P. V., Zeng, H., Solórzano, A., Swayne, D. E., Cox, N. J., Katz, J. M., Taubenberger, J. K., Palese, P., & García-Sastre, A. (2005). Characterization of the reconstructed 1918 Spanish influenza pandemic virus. Science, 310(5745), 77–80. doi:10.1126/science.1119392
- Vana, G., & Westover, K. M. (2008). Origin of the 1918 Spanish influenza virus: A comparative genomic analysis. Molecular Phylogenetics and Evolution, 47(3), 1100–1110. doi:10.1016/j.ympev.2008.02.003
- Vázquez-Espinosa, E., Laganà, C., & Vázquez, F. (2020). The Spanish flu and the fiction literature. Revista Española de Quimioterapia, 33(5), 296–312. doi:10.37201/req/049.2020
- World Health Organization Writing Group. (2006). Nonpharmaceutical interventions for pandemic influenza, international measures. Emerging Infectious Diseases, 12(1), 81–87. doi:10.3201/eid1201.051370
- Worobey, M., Han, G.-Z., & Rambaut, A. (2014). Genesis and pathogenesis of the 1918 pandemic H1N1 influenza A virus. Proceedings of the National Academy of Sciences, 111(22), 8107–8112. doi:10.1073/pnas.1324197111

== Aftermath ==
- Beiner, G. (Ed.). (2021). Pandemic re-awakenings: The forgotten and unforgotten "Spanish" flu of 1918–1919. Oxford University Press. doi:10.1093/oso/9780192843739.001.0001
- Correia, S., Luck, S., & Verner, E. (2022). Pandemics depress the economy, public health interventions do not: Evidence from the 1918 flu. The Journal of Economic History, 82(4), 917–957. doi:10.1017/S0022050722000407
- Davis, R. A. (2013). The Spanish flu: Narrative and cultural identity in Spain, 1918. Palgrave Macmillan. doi:10.1057/9781137339218
- Garrett, T. A. (2009). War and pestilence as labor market shocks: U.S. manufacturing wage growth 1914–1919. Economic Inquiry, 47(4), 711–725. doi:10.1111/j.1465-7295.2008.00137.x
- Karlsson, M., Nilsson, T., & Pichler, S. (2014). The impact of the 1918 Spanish flu epidemic on economic performance in Sweden. Journal of Health Economics, 36, 1–19. doi:10.1016/j.jhealeco.2014.03.005
- Lin, M.-J., & Liu, E. M. (2014). Does in utero exposure to illness matter? The 1918 influenza epidemic in Taiwan as a natural experiment. Journal of Health Economics, 37, 152–163. doi:10.1016/j.jhealeco.2014.05.004
- McKnight Nichols, C., Ewing, E. T., Gaston, K. H., Marinari, M., Lessoff, A., & Huyssen, D. (2022). What came next?: Reflections on the aftermath(s) of the 1918–19 flu pandemic in the age of COVID. The Journal of the Gilded Age and Progressive Era, 21(2), 111–149. doi:10.1017/S1537781421000682
- Neelsen, S., & Stratmann, T. (2012). Long-run effects of fetal influenza exposure: Evidence from Switzerland. Social Science & Medicine, 74(1), 58–66. doi:10.1016/j.socscimed.2011.09.039
- Nelson, R. E. (2010). Testing the fetal origins hypothesis in a developing country: Evidence from the 1918 influenza pandemic. Health Economics, 19(10), 1181–1192. doi:10.1002/hec.1544
- Velde, F. R. (2022). What happened to the U.S. economy during the 1918 influenza pandemic? A view through high-frequency data. The Journal of Economic History, 82(1), 284–326. doi:10.1017/S0022050722000055

== Primary sources ==
- Frost, W. H. (1920). Statistics of influenza morbidity: With special reference to certain factors in case incidence and case fatality. Public Health Reports, 35(11), 584–597. JSTOR 4575511
- Grist, N. R. (1979). Pandemic influenza 1918. BMJ, 2(6205), 1632–1633. doi:10.1136/bmj.2.6205.1632
- Hammond, J., Rolland, W., & Shore, T. (1917). Purulent bronchitis. The Lancet, 190(4898), 41–46. doi:10.1016/S0140-6736(01)56229-7
- Jordan, E. O. (1927). Epidemic influenza: A survey. American Medical Association.
- McCord, C. P. (1966). The purple death: Some things remembered about the influenza epidemic of 1918 at one army camp. Journal of Occupational Medicine, 8(11), 593–598.
- Phillips, H. (2018). In a time of plague: Memories of the "Spanish" flu epidemic of 1918 in South Africa. Van Riebeeck Society.
- Soper, G. A. (1918). The influenza pneumonia pandemic in the American army camps during September and October, 1918. Science, 48(1245), 451–456. doi:10.1126/science.48.1245.451
- Soper, G. A. (1919). The lessons of the pandemic. Science, 49(1274), 501–506. doi:10.1126/science.49.1274.501
- Starr, I. (1976). Influenza in 1918: Recollections of the epidemic in Philadelphia. Annals of Internal Medicine, 85(4), 516–518. doi:10.7326/0003-4819-85-4-516
- Sydenstricker, E. (1918). Preliminary statistics of the influenza epidemic. Public Health Reports, 33(52), 2305–2321. JSTOR 4574973
- Vaughan, W. T. (1921). Influenza: An epidemiologic study (American Journal of Hygiene Monographic Series No. 1). American Journal of Hygiene.

== See also ==
- 1918 flu pandemic in India
- Influenza A virus subtype H1N1
- Influenza pandemic
- List of epidemics and pandemics
- List of Spanish flu cases
- Philadelphia Liberty Loans Parade
- Spanish flu
- Spanish flu research
- SS Talune
- Timeline of influenza
