= Carrie Cornplanter =

American painter

Carrie Cornplanter (Seneca: Dédon, 1887–1918) was a Native American artist of the Seneca tribe.

Little is recorded of Cornplanter's life save that she was the elder sister of Jesse Cornplanter, had a sister named Anna, and had children of her own, and that her native name was "dédon". The three were descendants of Chief Cornplanter and the daughters of Edward Cornplanter. Carrie's paintings are among the earliest known by an American Indian woman to depict traditional aspects of native life. Most were created during the last decade of the 19th century or the first decade of the 20th, and she was thus at a relatively young age when she made the paintings. One such work, Indian Squaws Pounding Corn, is owned by the National Museum of the American Indian. Dating to around 1900, it was donated to the museum in 1922 by Joseph W. Keppler, a friend of the principal benefactor of the museum George Gustav Heye. Keppler likely purchased the piece directly from the artist or from a member of her family.

Carrie died in the 1918 flu pandemic. Her sister Anna and two of Carrie's daughters were the only members of the family other than Jesse to survive; the children were left destitute by the loss of their mother and were placed in Jesse's care when he returned home from World War I in Europe.

== See also ==
- List of Native American artists
- List of Spanish flu cases
