= Edward Cornplanter =

Seneca leader

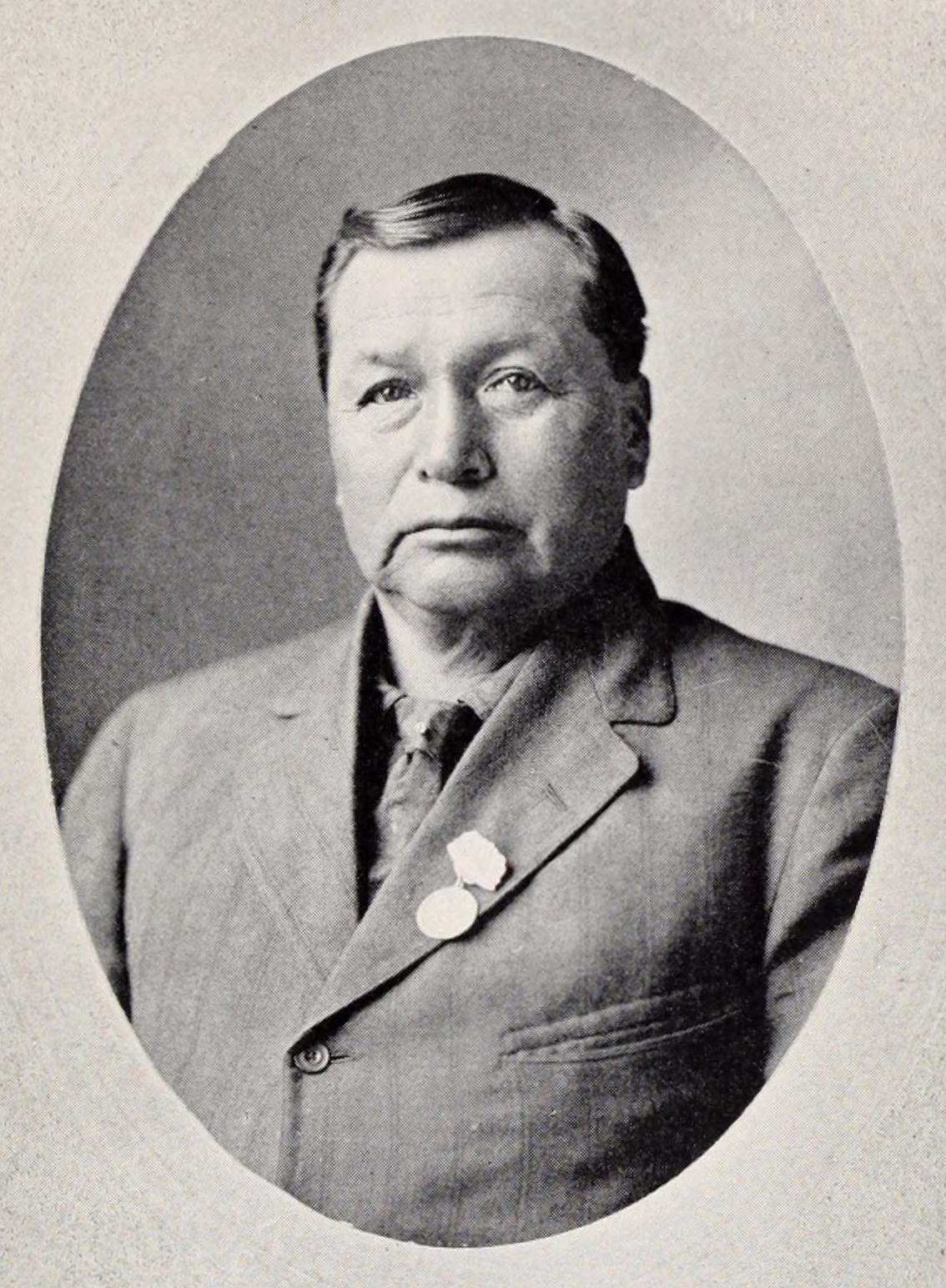
Edward Cornplanter

Edward Cornplanter or So-son-do-wa (1856–1918) was a chief of the Seneca people of the Haudenosaunee (Iroquois) and a leading exponent of the Code of Handsome Lake (Gai'wiio, also known as the Longhouse Religion).

Cornplanter, the son of Moses and Sarah (Phillips) Cornplanter, was born in November 1856 on the Seneca Cattaraugus Reservation. He was the great-grandson of Chief Cornplanter, who led the tribe during the American Revolutionary War. His Seneca name So-son-do-wa means "Deep Night."

In 1882, he married Nancy Jack. They had nine children, only three of whom would survive to adulthood: Jesse Cornplanter (1889–1957), who became renowned as an artist and author; Carrie Cornplanter (1887–1918), whose childhood artwork would also find exposure; and Anna Cornplanter (1895–1960), about whom very little is known. Edward experienced infirmity beginning in 1915; he was initially expected to recover (which led to Jesse being free to enlist and fight World War I) but never did, dying while Jesse was overseas in 1918. Shortly thereafter, the Spanish flu pandemic decimated the family, killing Nancy, Carrie and all but Anna, Jesse, and two of Carrie's young children.

Cornplanter was one of six Haudenosaunee authorized as "holders of the Gai'wiio"; he regularly traveled among the Haudenosaunee reservations to pass on the teachings. In 1903 he became concerned that oral transmission of the Gai'wiio` would not keep it from being lost. He wrote it down from memory and gave the material to the archives of New York State for preservation. His son Jesse Cornplanter illustrated this manuscript.

In addition to transcribing The Code of Handsome Lake, Cornplanter assisted the New York State Museum in compiling materials about Native American life in the state. He provided information as to the Haudenosaunee cultivation and use of "maize and other plant foods and many ... myths and tales."

Cornplanter died on June 10, 1918, at the Cattaraugus Reservation.
