= Cornplanter =

Seneca war leader and diplomat (1752–1836)

- Gayë́twageh
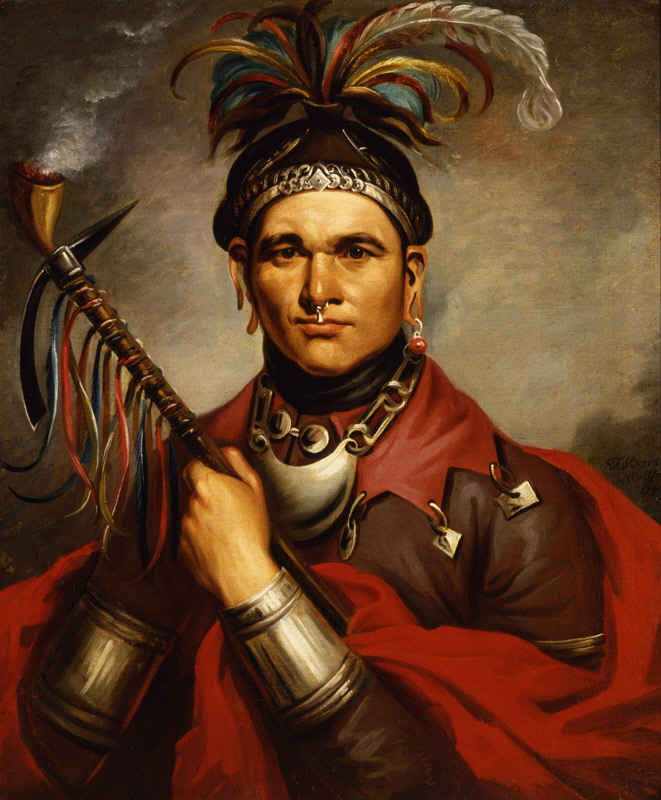
- Chief Cornplanter, portrait by Frederick Bartoli, 1796

Seneca leader
- Succeeded by: Edward Cornplanter

Personal details
- Born: c. 1752 Canawaugus (now part of Caledonia, Livingston, New York
- Died: February 18, 1836 Cornplanter Tract, Warren, Pennsylvania
- Resting place: Elk Township, Warren County, Pennsylvania
- Relations: Handsome Lake (half-brother); Guyasutha (uncle). Chainbreaker (nephew)
- Children: Henry O'Bail, Charles O'Bail, Polly O'Bail, William O'Bail, Esther O'Bail, Ja-wa-a-joh
- Parent(s): Gah-hon-no-neh (Seneca), Johannes Abeel (Dutch)
- Known for: War chief of the Seneca during the American Revolutionary War
- Nickname(s): John Abeel, John O'Bail, John O'Beale

John Abeel III (c. 1752–February 18, 1836) known as Gayë́twageh in the Seneca language and thus generally known as Cornplanter, was a Seneca war leader and diplomat. As a war leader, Cornplanter fought in the American Revolutionary War on the side of the British. After the war Cornplanter led negotiations with the United States and was a signatory of the Treaty of Fort Stanwix (1784), the Treaty of Canandaigua (1794), and other treaties. He helped ensure Seneca neutrality during the Northwest Indian War.

In the postwar years, Cornplanter endeavoured to learn more about European-American culture and invited Quakers to establish schools in Seneca territory. After the War of 1812 he became disillusioned by his people's poor reaction to European-American society. He had the schools closed and embraced his half-brother Handsome Lake's movement to return to traditional Seneca ways and religion.

The United States government granted him about 1500 acres of former Seneca territory in Pennsylvania in 1796 for "him and his heirs forever," which became known as the Cornplanter Tract. The federal government, however, started construction of the Kinzua Dam on the Allegany River in 1960. When the dam was completed, the Cornplanter Tract was flooded, and most of the few remaining residents moved to the Allegany Reservation of the federally recognized Seneca Nation of Indians. Before flooding occurred the remains of Cornplanter, his descendants, and an 1866 monument to him were relocated.

== Early life ==
Cornplanter was of Seneca and Dutch ancestry. He was born about 1752 at Canawaugus (now in the Town of Caledonia) on the Genesee River in present-day New York State. He was the son of a Native American woman from the Seneca nation, Gah-hon-no-neh (She Who Goes to the River), and a Dutch-American trader, Johannes "John" Abeel II.

Cornplanter was raised by his mother among the Seneca. His Seneca name, Gayë́twageh (often spelled Gaiänt'wakê or Gyantwachia), means "the planter," and another variation, Kaintwakon or Kaiiontwa'kon, means "by what one plants." As the Seneca and other Haudenosaunee nations had a matrilineal system of kinship, Cornplanter was considered a member of his mother's clan, the Wolf Clan. His maternal uncle, Guyasuta, was an important Seneca leader.

The Dutch had settled the Hudson River Valley several generations earlier, and Cornplanter's father, an Albany fur trader, was part of an established family. The Abeel family name was sometimes Gaelicized to O'Bail and O'Beale. John Abeel II (1722–1794) was connected to the Schuyler family, leaders in business and politics. The grandfather after whom Cornplanter was named, Johannes Abeel I (1667–1711), was a trader and merchant who built up links with the indigenous people along his trade routes, and who served as the second mayor of Albany. The younger John Abeel was a gunsmith and was gladly welcomed into the Haudenosaunee community to repair their guns.

== War chief ==
When the American Revolutionary War began in 1775, Cornplanter urged the Seneca to remain neutral. He is reported to have said, "War is war. Death is death. A fight is a hard business."

Initially, both the British and the Americans also wanted the Haudenosaunee to remain neutral. As the war progressed, however, the British began encouraging the Haudenosaunee to "take up the hatchet," while the Americans sought their continued neutrality. In July 1777, the Seneca met with John Butler, a deputy superintendent in the British Indian Department at Irondequoit to discuss whether to abandon their neutrality. Although Cornplanter strongly opposed becoming involved, the Seneca eventually agreed to actively support the British against the Americans. Cornplanter honoured that decision.

Because of the status of the Seneca as "elder brothers" among the Haudenosaunee, most of the Haudenosaunee Confederacy followed suit. The Oneida and the Tuscarora, however, strongly influenced by the missionaries such as Samuel Kirkland, resolved to support the Americans instead. Cornplanter and Sayenqueraghta were named as war chiefs of the four nations that allied with the British: the Mohawk, Seneca, Onondaga and Cayuga.

During the Siege of Fort Stanwix in August 1777, Cornplanter played a significant role in the ambush of a column of Patriot militia and Oneida at the Battle of Oriskany. In 1778, he joined forces with John Butler and Butler's Rangers at the 1778 Battle of Wyoming in what is now Northeastern Pennsylvania. Roughly 300 Patriot militia and Continentals were killed in what is commonly known as the Wyoming Massacre. The battle was followed by widespread looting and burning throughout the Wyoming Valley but non-combatants were not harmed.

In November 1778, Cornplanter led the Seneca at the Cherry Valley Massacre. During this raid many non-combatants were killed or taken captive.

In 1779, George Washington ordered Major General John Sullivan to invade Haudenosaunee territory and destroy their villages. Cornplanter, along with Joseph Brant, Sayenqueraghta, and Butler, fought a desperate delaying action in order to allow the escape of refugees to Fort Niagara. They were brushed aside at the Battle of Newtown by Sullivan's army of 4,500 men.

The Sullivan Expedition caused great destruction during the subsequent scorched earth campaign. They methodically razed villages, burned fields, and destroyed stored foodstuffs throughout the Seneca and Cayuga homeland. The Seneca suffered terribly during the following winter. Many froze or starved to death. Cornplanter and his warriors, however, continued to raid American settlements in 1780.

In May 1780, Cornplanter and Joseph Brant led an attack on Canojaharie on the Mohawk River. During this raid, Seneca warriors captured Cornplanter's father John Abeel and burned his house. Cornplanter, who had once gone as a young man to meet his father, recognized Abeel and offered apology. Cornplanter invited Abeel to go with him or return to his European family. When his father chose the latter, Cornplanter had Seneca warriors accompany him in safety.

A few months later Cornplanter participated in the large scale raid on the Schoharie Creek and Mohawk River valleys that culminated in the inconclusive Battle of Klock's Field. He was relatively inactive for the remainder of the war.

== Post-Revolutionary War years ==
When the war ended in 1783, Cornplanter recognized the need to develop a positive diplomatic relationship with the fledgling government of what the Haudenosaunee called the "Thirteen Fires." He became a negotiator in disputes between the new "Americans" and the Seneca. He was a signatory of the Treaty of Fort Stanwix (1784), although this treaty was never ratified by the Haudenosaunee.

During the Northwest Indian War, Native Americans in what is now Ohio and Indiana mounted a resistance to the encroachment of European settlers into their territory. Cornplanter convinced the Seneca to remain neutral in this conflict. In addition, he attempted to negotiate with the Shawnee on behalf of the United States.

In 1790, Cornplanter and other Seneca leaders travelled to Philadelphia to meet with President George Washington and Pennsylvania Governor Thomas Mifflin and protest the treatment of their people. Cornplanter extracted an agreement from Washington and Mifflin to protect Seneca land.

Cornplanter made a number of trips to Philadelphia, and later Washington, to strengthen relationships and meet with those who were interested in his people. He tried to understand European-American culture, as he felt it necessary for successful relations between the Haudenosaunee and the United States.

Cornplanter was particularly impressed by the beliefs and practices of the Quakers. Like the Quakers, Cornplanter and his half-brother, the religious leader Handsome Lake, strongly opposed the use of liquor, and unlike other Protestant groups, the goal of Quaker missionaries was to educate rather than convert. Cornplanter invited Quakers to the Cornplanter Tract to help the Seneca learn new skills such as animal husbandry, carpentry and smithing as they could no longer rely on hunting or the fur trade as a way of life. He also encouraged Seneca men to become involved in growing crops, a task which traditionally was done by women.

In 1794, Cornplanter was a signatory to the Treaty of Canandaigua. The treaty proclaimed "peace and friendship" between the United States of America and the Haudenosaunee, and affirmed their land rights in the state of New York. Three years later he signed the Treaty of Big Tree that established Seneca reservations within their traditional territory.

Eventually, Cornplanter became disillusioned with his relationship with the Americans. To fight the drunkenness and despair suffered by many Indians, his half-brother Handsome Lake preached that the Seneca must return to the traditional way of life and take part in religious ceremonies. Cornplanter heeded Handsome Lake's prophecy that they should return to traditional ways and turn away from European assimilation. He burned his military uniform, broke his sword, and destroyed his medals. He closed the schools but did not completely break relations with the Quakers as he retained his respect for them.

Cornplanter occasionally openly expressed his disdain for whites. Upon taking a short ride on the first steamboat to navigate the upper Allegheny River, Cornplanter, while generally impressed with the boat, quipped that "white men will do anything to avoid using their muscles."

During the War of 1812, Cornplanter did not play an active role in the fighting along the Niagara River, however, his son Henry and his nephew Chainbreaker, also known as Blacksnake actively supported the Americans.

As Cornplanter aged, his influence among the Seneca dwindled in favour of Chainbreaker and Red Jacket. He died in 1836 at his home in the Cornplanter Tract.

== Family ==
Cornplanter had an older half-brother, Handsome Lake, who later became a Seneca religious leader. He was the uncle of the influential sachem Chainbreaker, and the nephew of Guyasuta, a leader of the western Seneca during Pontiac's War.

Cornplanter married twice and had seven children. The names of six of the seven are known. One of Cornplanter's sons had an intellectual disability and is only referred to as "The Idiot" in primary sources.

While in Philadelphia in 1790, Cornplanter had met with Quaker leaders. He was impressed enough to send his son Henry to the Quaker school the following year. This sparked a continuing relationship between Cornplanter and the Quaker community. Henry Abeel (spelled Henry Abeele in federal documents) later served as an interpreter at the Treaty of Canandaigua negotiations in 1794.

Cornplanter's direct issue lasted five generations. Great-great-great grandson Jesse Cornplanter, an artist and the son of Edward Cornplanter, was the last direct male heir; he had no children, and much of the extended Abeel/Cornplanter family had died in the 1910s. Jesse adopted two children, the children of his late sister Carrie.

Cornplanter descendants meet annually to Remember the Removal. There are hundreds of descendants of Cornplanter. They meet annually at the Annual Cornplanter Reunion Picnic. In 2018, the Cornplanter newsletters were compiled and published. These include genealogical information and stories from Cornplanter descendants.

== Cornplanter Tract ==
In gratitude for his assistance to the state, the Pennsylvania government gave Cornplanter a grant of 1,500 acres (6.1 km^{2}) in 1796 along the western bank of the Allegheny River about three miles (5 km) below the southern boundary of New York state, allotting it to him and his heirs "forever". By 1798, 400 Seneca lived on the land, which was called the Cornplanter Tract or Cornplanter Grant. In 1821 Warren County, Pennsylvania tried to force Cornplanter to pay taxes for his land, which he protested on the basis that the land had been "granted" to him by the U.S. government. After much talk, the state finally agreed that the Cornplanter Tract was exempt. Most of the Cornplanter Tract and his village, Diono?sade'gî (Place of burnt house) or Tiononshaté:ken (The house has burnt there), was deserted by the late 1950s, as it was never connected to the electrical grid and was prone to flooding.

== Cornplanter Monument ==
Before his death in 1836, Cornplanter had requested a grave with no marker. In 1866, however, the State of Pennsylvania installed a monument over his grave, "believed to be first monument erected in honor of a Native American in the United States."

Hon. James Ross Snowden of Philadelphia gave the dedicatory address, saying in part:

He was a dauntless warrior and wisest statesman of his nation, the patriarch of this tribe and the peacemaker of his race. He was a model man from nature's mould. Truth, temperance, justice and humanity, never had a nobler incarnation or more earnest and consistent advocate then he. As we loved him personally, and revere the nobel, manly character he bore, we erect this tribute to his memory, that those who live after us may know and imitate his virtues.

== Relocation of Cornplanter's grave ==
In 1965, the new federal Kinzua Dam at Warren, Pennsylvania, was completed, creating the Allegheny Reservoir for flood control, and permanently flooding all but a small corner of the Cornplanter Tract. Cornplanter's grave was moved with the Cornplanter Monument, to higher ground, at the Riverview-Corydon Cemetery, located in Elk Township, Warren County, Pennsylvania. "The grounds are located west of the north central Pennsylvania town of Bradford just about 100 yards from the New York state line. The cemetery contains what are believed to be the remains of Cornplanter", and some 300 of his descendants and followers. This property has eroded over the years, threatening the preservation of this important cemetery. The Seneca are reminded of their losses due to this damage. In 2009 the state made plans to try to protect the cemetery. The state of Pennsylvania erected an honorary marker at the site in 1966, after the original Cornplanter Tract was being submerged.

== Legacy ==
- The relocation of Cornplanter's remains and gravesite figure in the song "As Long As The Grass Shall Grow", which Johnny Cash recorded in 1964; it was originally written by Peter LaFarge.
- The Chief Cornplanter Boy Scout Council, headquartered in Warren, as well as their Order of the Arrow lodge, Gyantwachia Lodge #255 are named in his honor.
- Cornplanter State Forest in Forest County, Pennsylvania is named for him and comprises 1,585 acres (6.41 km^{2}) of land.
- "The Cornplanter Medal was introduced in 1901 by Frederick Starr who had conducted research on the Iroquois Indians and wanted to give public acknowledgement to others who had contributed to the knowledge of the tribes. In order to help establish the medal, Starr and his colleagues raised money by selling a series of drawings of Indian life by Jesse Cornplanter.
- In 2003, the Warren, Pennsylvania-based non-profit organization Friends of Allegheny Wilderness proposed that a 3,022-acre inventoried roadless area, directly adjacent to the Cornplanter land grant within Allegheny National Forest lands, be designated as a wilderness area under the Wilderness Act of 1964, and that this wilderness area should be called the Cornplanter Wilderness in honor of Chief Cornplanter.
- The Cornplanter Stage inside the Key Bank Pavilion on the Warren County Fairgrounds in Pittsfield, Pennsylvania, is named after him.
- In 2008, The Kane Republican ran a Thanksgiving editorial titled "Giving Thanks for Cornplanter's Legacy."
- A 2009 newspaper column titled, "Cornplanter, can you swim?" (quoting the song) proposed renaming Allegheny Reservoir as Cornplanter Lake.
- In 2011, the Center Street Bridge carrying New York State Route 353 over the Allegheny River in Salamanca, NY was renamed the Chief Cornplanter (Gayetwage) Memorial Bridge.
- Cornplanter's portrait is held in the collection of the New-York Historical Society in New York City.
- A pipe tomahawk given to Cornplanter by George Washington in 1792 disappeared from the New York State Museum in the late 1940s, but was eventually returned and put back on display in 2018.
- Cornplanter is featured in a panel chronicling his support of the British during the American Revolution at the Museum of the American Revolution, as well as at the American Revolution Museum in Yorktown.
- Cornplanter College is the name selected for a proposed "alternative education" college in the city of Salamanca, NY, which the city rents the property for from the Seneca Nation of Indians. Plans for the college, however, have stalled since the announcement in 2014.
