= Father Florian =

Bavarian prince (1957–2022)

- Born: 21 September 1957; Schloss Leutstetten, Leutstetten, Bavaria, Germany
- Died: 22 June 2022 (aged 64); Ruaraka Hospital, Ruaraka, Nairobi, Kenya
Names
- German: Franz-Josef Michael Maria Ignatius Prinz von Bayern
- House: Wittelsbach
- Father: Prince Rasso of Bavaria
- Mother: Archduchess Theresa of Austria

Father Florian (born Franz-Josef Prinz von Bayern, 21 September 1957 – 22 June 2022) was a member of the Roman Catholic Order of Saint Benedict.

== Early life ==
Franz-Josef was born at Schloß Leutstetten near Starnberg, Bavaria. He was the eldest son of Prince Rasso of Bavaria and his wife, Archduchess Theresa of Austria, and belonged to the House of Wittelsbach.

== Later life ==
Florian was a Benedictine monk, a member of the Roman Catholic Order of Saint Benedict. Until 1996, he lived under the name Pater Florian at the St. Ottilien Archabbey in Emming in southern Bavaria. Since 1996, he had been living at the Peramiho Abbey in Tanzania and in Kenya he became prior administrator of the Prince of Peace Benedictine Monastery – Tigoni Limuru. He was lately working in Illeret, St. Peter the Fisherman parish, and a new Benedictine Monastery in the Diocese of Marsabit, northern part of Kenya. Pater Florian died in Kenya on 22 June 2022.
