= Wallsee-Sindelburg =

- Municipality
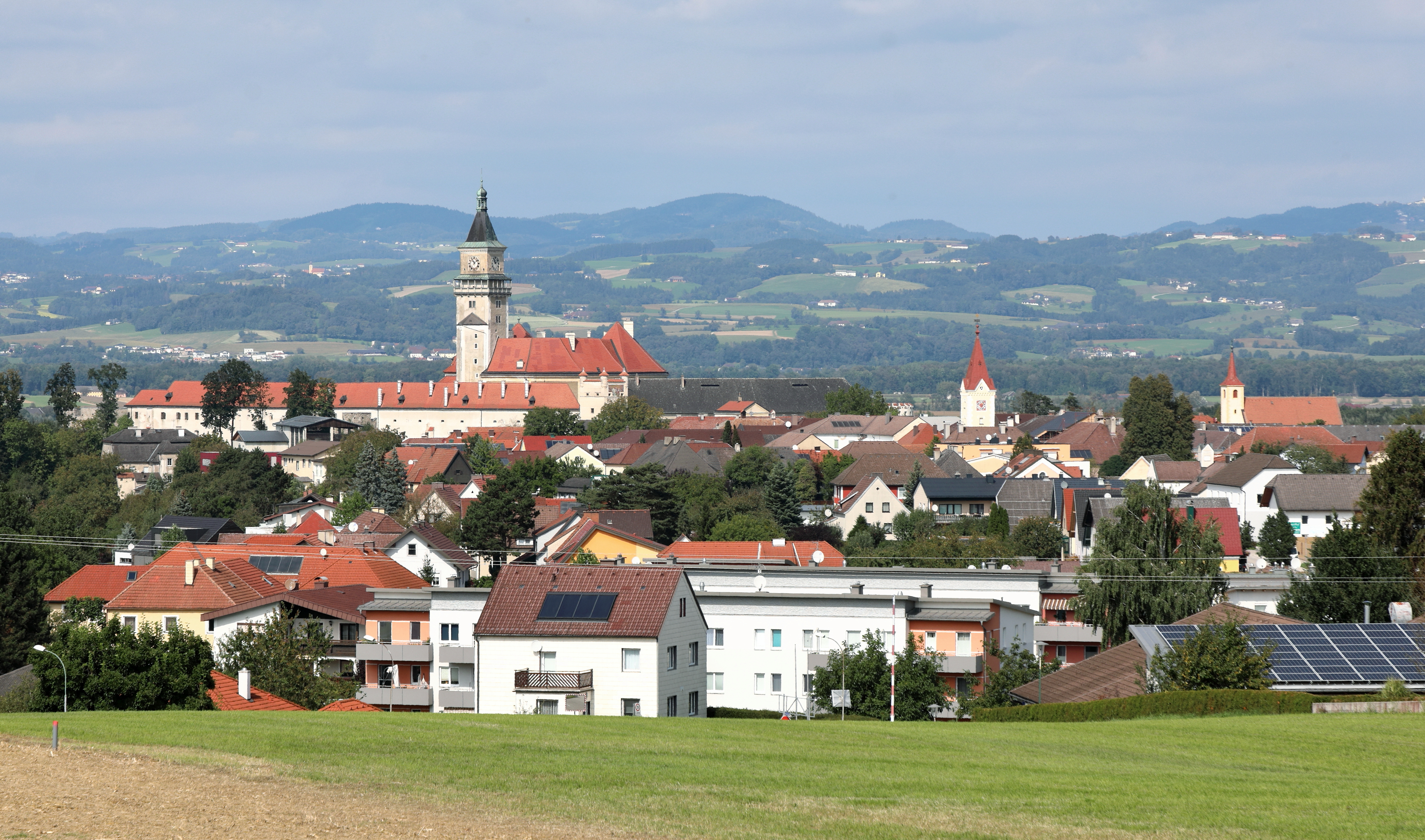
- Wallsee

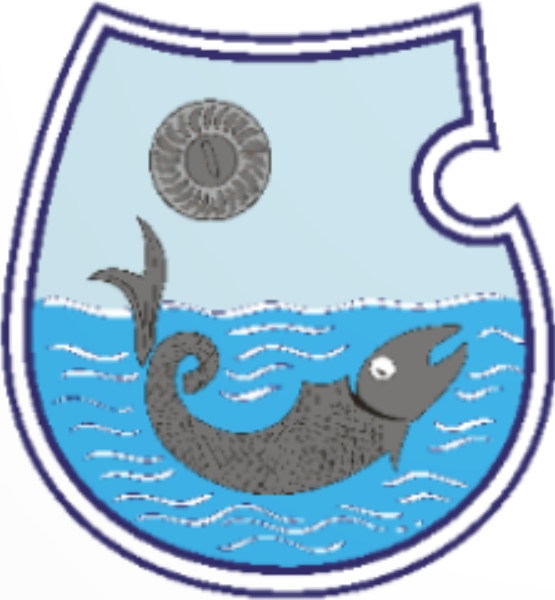
- Coat of arms

- Location within Austria
- Coordinates: 48°10′N 14°43′E
- Country: Austria
- State: Lower Austria
- District: Amstetten

Government
  - Mayor: Johann Bachinger

Area
  - Total: 25.94 km^{2} (10.02 sq mi)
- Elevation: 275 m (902 ft)

Population (2018-01-01)
  - Total: 2,178
  - Density: 83.96/km^{2} (217.5/sq mi)
- Time zone: UTC+1 (CET)
  - Summer (DST): UTC+2 (CEST)
- Postal code: 3313, 3312
- Area code: 07433
- Website: www.wallsee-sindelburg.gv.at

Wallsee-Sindelburg is a town in the district of Amstetten in Lower Austria in Austria.

== Geography ==
Wallsee-Sindelburg lies in the northwest part of the Mostviertel in Lower Austria, south of the West autobahn on the Danube River. About 26 percent of the municipality is forested.
