= List of ambassadors to the Czech Republic =

This is a list of ambassadors to Czech Republic. Note that some ambassadors are responsible for more than one country while others are directly accredited to Prague.

== Current ambassadors to Czech Republic ==
Sending country	Date of presentation of the credentials	Location of resident embassy	Ambassador	
Islamic Republic of Afghanistan	11.12.2019	Prague, Czech Republic	Shahzad Gul Aryobee	
Albania	15.02.2024	Prague, Czech Republic	Ilir Tepelena	
Algeria	21.09.2022	Prague, Czech Republic	Belkacem Zeghmati	
Andorra		Andorra la Vella, Andorra	vacant	
Angola	23.02.2022	Berlin, Germany	Balbina Malheiros Dias da Silva	
Antigua and Barbuda	21.06.2016	Saint John´s, Antigua and Barbuda	Arthur George Belfester Thomas	
Argentina	08.12.2023	Prague, Czech Republic	Claudio Javier Rozencwaig	
Armenia	21.02.2019	Prague, Czech Republic	Ashot Hovakimian	
Australia	28.02.2012	Warsaw, Poland	Jean Dunn	
Austria	21.10.2020	Prague, Czech Republic	Bettina Kirnbauer	
Azerbaijan	21.10.2020	Prague, Czech Republic	Adish Mammadov	
Bahrain	07.05.2019	Berlin, Germany	Abdulla Abdullatif Al Sheikh Abdulla	
Bangladesh	17.08.2021	Berlin, Germany	Md Mosharraf Hossain Bhuiyan	
Belarus		Prague, Czech Republic	Olga Filimonchik (Chargé d'Affaires a.i.)	
Belgium	05.10.2023	Prague, Czech Republic	Jurgen van Meirvenne	
Bolivia		Vienna, Austria	vacant	
Bosnia and Herzegovina	21.10.2020	Prague, Czech Republic	Martina Mlinarević	
Botswana	19.02.2020	London, UK	John Gosiamemang Ndebele Seakgosing	
Brazil	13.07.2022	Prague, Czech Republic	Sônia Regina Guimarães Gomes	
Bulgaria	04.04.2023	Prague, Czech Republic	Dantcho Dobrinov Mitchev	
Burkina Faso		Vienna, Austria	vacant	
Burundi	19.02.2026	Berlin, Germany	Annonciata Sendazirasa	
Cambodia		Berlin, Germany	vacant	
Cameroon		Moscow, Russia	vacant	
Canada	18.10.2023	Prague, Czech Republic	Emily Ann McLaughlin	
Cape Verde		Berlin, Germany	vacant	
Chad	23.05.2000	Berlin, Germany	vacant	
Chile	21.09.2022	Prague, Czech Republic	Hernán Pablo Arturo Bascuñán Jiménez	https://www.czechleaders.com/posts/the-president-of-the-republic-received-new-ambassadors-14/
China	27.10.2022	Prague, Czech Republic	Biao Feng	
Colombia	11.04.2011	Vienna, Austria	Freddy Padilla de León	
Comoros		Moroni, Comoros	vacant	
Congo	08.12.2023	Berlin, Germany	Edith Antoinette Itoua	
Costa Rica		Berlin, Germany	vacant	
Côte d'Ivoire	26.10.2023	Berlin, Germany	Philippe Mangou	
Croatia	21.02.2019	Prague, Czech Republic	Ljiljana Pancirov	
Cuba	02.06.2023	Prague, Czech Republic	Saylín Martínez Tarrío	
Cyprus	15.02.2023	Prague, Czech Republic	George Yiango	
Democratic Republic of Congo		Prague, Czech Republic	Romain Mukengela Kalanda (Chargé d'Affaires e.p.)	
Denmark	20.12.2021	Prague, Czech Republic	Søren Kelstrup	
Djibouti	15.02.2023	Berlin, Germany	Yacin Houssein Doualé	
Dominican Republic		Vienna, Austria	vacant	
Ecuador	10.05.2012	Berlin, Germany	Jorge Jurado Mosquera	
Egypt	15.02.2023	Prague, Czech Republic	Mahmoud Mostafa Afifi	
El Salvador	22.08.2018	Berlin, Germany	Florencia Eugenia Vilanova de von Oehsen	
Equatorial Guinea		Berlin, Germany	vacant	
Eritrea		Berlin, Germany	vacant	
Estonia	17.09.2010	Prague, Czech Republic	Gita Kalmet	
Ethiopia	15.02.2024	Berlin, Germany	Fekadu Beyene Ayana	
Finland	13.07.2022	Prague, Czech Republic	Pasi Olavi Tuominen	
France		Prague, Czech Republic	Félix Buttin (Chargé d'Affaires a.i.)	
Gabon	26.09.1995	Libreville, Gabon	Samuel-Lambert Ondo	
Gambia	15.02.2024	Brussels, Belgium	Pa Musa Jobarteh	
Georgia	04.04.2023	Prague, Czech Republic	Thea Maisuradze	
Germany	17.08.2021	Prague, Czech Republic	Andreas Künne	
Ghana	18.10.2023	Prague, Czech Republic	Doris Adzo Denyo Brese	
Greece	09.12.2020	Prague, Czech Republic	Athanassios Paressoglou	
Guatemala		Vienna, Austria	vacant	
Guinea		Berlin, Germany	vacant	
Guinea-Bissau		Lisbon, Portugal	vacant	
Guyana		London, UK	vacant	
Holy See	13.07.2022	Prague, Czech Republic	Jude Thaddeus Okolo	
Honduras	26.10.2023	Vienna, Austria]	Elena María Freije Murillo	
Hungary	21.09.2022	Prague, Czech Republic	András Baranyi	
Iceland	15.02.2023	Berlin, Germany	María Erla Marelsdóttir	
India	21.10.2020	Prague, Czech Republic	Hemant Harishchandra Kotalwar	
Indonesia	01.07.2025	Prague, Czech Republic	Rina Soemarno	
Iran	21.09.2022	Prague, Czech Republic	Seyed Majid Ghafeleh Bashi	
Iraq	20.12.2021	Prague, Czech Republic	Falah Abdulhasan Abdulsada Abdulsada	
Ireland	18.10.2023	Prague, Czech Republic	Alan Gibbons	
Israel	17.08.2021	Prague, Czech Republic	Anna Azari	
Italy	20.12.2021	Prague, Czech Republic	Mauro Marsili	
Jamaica		Berlin, Germany	Deniese Ava-Lou Sealey (Chargé d'Affaires a.i.)	
Japan	09.12.2020	Prague, Czech Republic	Hideo Suzuki	
Jordan	15.04.2008	Vienna, Austria	Makram M. Queisi	
Kazakhstan	05.10.2023	Prague, Czech Republic	Bakyt Dyussenbayev	
Kenya		The Hague, Netherlands	vacant	
Kosovo	05.10.2023	Prague, Czech Republic	Albesjana Iberhysaj-Kapitaj	
Kuwait	14.11.2018	Prague, Czech Republic	Rashed Faleh Alhajri	
Kyrgyzstan	15.02.2024	Vienna, Austria	Tolendy Makeyev	
Laos	26.10.2023	Berlin, Germany	Mayboui Xayavanga	
Latvia	15.02.2023	Prague, Czech Republic	Elita Kuzma	
Lebanon	06.12.2017	Prague, Czech Republic	Rola Hamdan	
Lesotho		Rome, Italy	vacant	
Libya		Prague, Czech Republic	Bashir E. A. Alhaji (Chargé d'Affaires a.i.)	
Liechtenstein	11.04.2011	Vienna, Austria	Maria-Pia Kothbauer	
Lithuania	21.10.2020	Prague, Czech Republic	Laimonas Talat-Kelpša	
Luxembourg	20.12.2021	Prague, Czech Republic	Ronald Dofing	
Madagascar		Falkensee, Germany	vacant	
Malawi	02.06.2023	Berlin, Germany	Joseph John Mpinganjira	
Malaysia	04.04.2023	Prague, Czech Republic	Suzilah Binti Mohd Sidek	
Mali	19.02.2020	Rome, Italy	Aly Coulibaly	
Malta	18.03.2014	Valletta, Malta	Godfrey A. Pirotta	
Mauritania		Berlin, Germany	vacant	
Mauritius	21.09.2022	Berlin, Germany	Christelle Sohun	
Mexico		Prague, Czech Republic	Miguel Angel Vilchis Salgado (Chargé d'Affaires a.i.)	
Moldova	21.10.2020	Prague, Czech Republic	Alexandru Codreanu	
Monaco		Monaco, Monaco	vacant	
Mongolia	20.12.2021	Prague, Czech Republic	Gansukh Khashkhan Damdin	
Montenegro		Vienna, Austria	Dragana Radulović (Chargé d'Affaires a.i.)	
Morocco	18.07.2018	Prague, Czech Republic	Hanane Saadi	
Mozambique		Berlin, Germany	vacant	
Myanmar		Prague, Czech Republic	Htuann Naung (Chargé d'Affaires a.i.)	
Namibia	23.02.2022	Berlin, Germany	Martin Andjaba	
Nepal	13.07.2022	Berlin, Germany	Ram Kaji Khadka	
Netherlands	17.08.2021	Prague, Czech Republic	Daan Feddo Huisinga	
New Zealand	21.09.2022	Berlin, Germany	Craig John Hawke	
Nicaragua	18.06.2015	Vienna, Austria	Alvaro José González Robelo	
Niger		Berlin, Germany	Amina Djibo Bazindre (Chargé d'Affaires a.i.)	
Nigeria		Prague, Czech Republic	Blessing Chinyere Ibe-Torti (Chargé d'Affaires a.i.)	
North Korea	21.10.2020	Prague, Czech Republic	Ju Won Chol	
North Macedonia	15.02.2024	Prague, Czech Republic	Emil Krsteski	
Norway	21.09.2022	Prague, Czech Republic	Victor Conrad Rønneberg	
Oman	09.12.2020	Vienna, Austria	Yousuf Ahmed Hamed Aljabri	
Pakistan	05.10.2023	Prague, Czech Republic	Ayesha Ali	
Palestine	30.09.2014	Prague, Czech Republic	Khaled Alattrash	
Panama	23.02.2022	Berlin, Germany	Enrique Alberto Thayer Hausz	
Paraguay	23.02.2022	Vienna, Austria	Juan Francisco Facetti Fernandez	
Peru	20.12.2021	Prague, Czech Republic	Néstor Popolizio	
Philippines	04.04.2023	Prague, Czech Republic	Eduardo R. Meñez	
Poland	21.09.2022	Prague, Czech Republic	Mateusz Gniazdowski	
Portugal	30.01.2020	Prague, Czech Republic	Luís Pequito de Almeida Sampaio	
Qatar	26.10.2023	Prague, Czech Republic	Nasser Ibrahim Allenqawi	
Romania	12.05.2021	Prague, Czech Republic	Maria-Antoaneta Barta	
Russia	22.03.2016	Prague, Czech Republic	Alexander Vladimirovich Zmeyevskiy	
Rwanda	05.10.2023	Prague, Czech Republic	Richard Masozera	
Samoa	02.06.2023	Brussels, Belgium	Francella Maureen Strickland	
San Marino	28.11.1995	City of San Marino, San Marino	Pietro Giacomini	
Saudi Arabia	17.08.2021	Prague, Czech Republic	Abdullah Muteb A. Alrasheed	
Senegal	13.07.2022	Warsaw, Poland	Papa Diop	
Serbia	12.05.2021	Prague, Czech Republic	Berislav Vekić	
Seychelles		Brussels, Belgium	vacant	
Sierra Leone		Moscow, Russia	vacant	
Singapore	23.10.2007	Singapore, Singapore	Tan Soo Khoon	
Slovakia	18.10.2023	Prague, Czech Republic	Ingrid Brocková	
Slovenia	21.11.2019	Prague, Czech Republic	Tanja Strniša	
Solomon Islands		Brussels, Belgium	vacant	
Somalia		Moscow, Russia	vacant	
South Africa	15.02.2023	Prague, Czech Republic	Mosa Ditty Sejosingoe	
South Sudan		Berlin, Germany	vacant	
South Korea	14.07.2023	Prague, Czech Republic	Youngki Hong	
Sovereign Military Order of Malta	16.02.2016	Prague, Czech Republic	Wenceslas de Lobkowicz	
Spain	27.10.2022	Prague, Czech Republic	Alberto Moreno Humet	
Sri Lanka		Vienna, Austria	vacant	
Swaziland		Brussels, Belgium	vacant	
Sweden	21.10.2020	Prague, Czech Republic	Fredrik Jörgensen	
Switzerland	21.10.2020	Prague, Czech Republic	Philippe Gérald Guex	
Syria		Prague, Czech Republic	Mohamadia Alnasan (Chargé d'Affaires a.i.)	
Tajikistan		Berlin, Germany	vacant	
Tanzania		Berlin, Germany	vacant	
Thailand		Prague, Czech Republic	Natthaphon Sapsinsoonthon (Chargé d'Affaires a.i.)	
Timor-Leste	02.06.2023	Brussels, Belgium	Jorge de Camões	
Togo		Berlin, Germany	vacant	
Tunisia	30.01.2020	Prague, Czech Republic	Yosra Souiden	
Turkey	12.11.2019	Prague, Czech Republic	Egemen Bağış	
Turkmenistan	14.07.2023	Vienna, Austria	Hemra Amannazarov	
Uganda	08.12.2023	Berlin, Germany	Stephen Mubiru	
Ukraine		Prague, Czech Republic	Vitalii Usatyi (Chargé d'Affaires a.i.)	
United Arab Emirates		Prague, Czech Republic	Ghalia Ali Mohamed Ali Humaidan (Chargé d'Affaires a.i.)	
United Kingdom	15.02.2023	Prague, Czech Republic	Matt Field	
United States	15.02.2023	Prague, Czech Republic	Bijan Sabet	
Uruguay	12.05.2021	Vienna, Austria	Juan Carlos Ojeda Viglione	
Uzbekistan		Berlin, Germany	vacant	
Venezuela		Berlin, Germany	vacant	
Vietnam		Prague, Czech Republic	Dieu Linh Nguyen (Chargé d'Affaires a.i.)	
Yemen	11.01.2017	Prague, Czech Republic	Omer Hussein Thabet Saba'A	
Zambia		Berlin, Germany	vacant	
Zimbabwe		Geneva, Switzerland	vacant	
