= Princess Rosemary of Salm-Salm =

German princess

- Archduchess Hubert Salvator of Austria
- Wearing the pink topaz grand parure of Empress Marie-Louise
- Born: 13 April 1904; Potsdam, Kingdom of Prussia, German Empire
- Died: 3 May 2001 (aged 97); Schloss Persenbeug, Persenbeug-Gottsdorf, Austria
- Spouse: Archduke Hubert Salvator of Austria (m. 1926; died 1971)
- Issue Detail: Archduke Friedrich Salvator; Archduchess Agnes; Archduchess Maria Margaretha; Archduchess Maria Ludovica; Archduchess Maria Adelheid; Archduchess Elisabeth; Archduke Andreas Salvator; Archduchess Josepha Hedwig; Valerie, Margravine of Baden; Archduchess Maria Alberta; Archduke Markus Emanuel Salvator; Archduke Johann Salvator; Archduke Michael Salvator
Names
- German: Rosemary Friederike Isabella Eleonore Henriette Antonia
- House: Salm-Salm (by birth); Habsburg-Lorraine (by marriage)
- Father: Emanuel, Hereditary Prince of Salm-Salm
- Mother: Archduchess Maria Christina of Austria

Princess Rosemary of Salm-Salm (German: Rosemary Friederike Isabella Eleonore Henriette Antonia, Prinzessin zu Salm-Salm; 13 April 1904 – 3 May 2001) was a German-born noblewoman who became an Archduchess of Austria through her marriage to Archduke Hubert Salvator of the Habsburg-Lorraine dynasty. Born a princess of the princely House of Salm-Salm, she was a member of its Tuscan line by marriage.

== Family ==
Rosemary was born in Potsdam, then within the Kingdom of Prussia, the second child of Emanuel, Hereditary Prince of Salm-Salm, and his wife, Archduchess Maria Christina of Austria. At the time of her birth, her father served as a captain in the Prussian army, which was stationed in the Potsdam garrison.

Through her mother, Rosemary was a granddaughter of Archduke Friedrich, Duke of Teschen, a Supreme Commander of the Austro-Hungarian Army, and his wife, Princess Isabella of Croÿ.

== Marriage and issue ==
Rosemary married Archduke Hubert Salvator of Austria, the second son of Archduke Franz Salvator of Austria and Archduchess Marie Valerie of Austria, on 25 November 1926 in a civil ceremony at Anholt, followed by a religious ceremony on 26 November 1926. Through her husband, she was a granddaughter-in-law of Emperor Franz Joseph I of Austria.

The couple had thirteen children:

- Archduke Friedrich Salvator (27 November 1927 – 26 March 1999), married Countess Margit Kálnoky von Kőröspatak.
- Archduchess Agnes (14 December 1928 – 31 August 2007), married Prince Karl Alfred of Liechtenstein. Agnes and Karl Alfred are the parents of Princess Maria-Pia of Liechtenstein.
- Archduchess Maria Margaretha (born 29 January 1930).
- Archduchess Maria Ludovica (31 January 1931 – 17 April 1999), married Martin Roland.
- Archduchess Maria Adelheid (28 July 1933 – 10 October 2021).
- Archduchess Elisabeth (18 March 1935 – 9 October 1998), married Prince Heinrich von Auersperg-Breunner.
- Archduke Andreas Salvator (born 28 April 1936), married firstly Maria de la Piedad de Los Monteros y Rosillo, and secondly Countess Valerie von Podstatzky-Lichtenstein.
- Archduchess Josepha (born 2 September 1937), married Clemens, Count von Waldstein.
- Archduchess Valerie (born 23 May 1941), married Maximilian, Margrave of Baden.
- Archduchess Maria Alberta (born 1 June 1944), married Alexander, Baron von Kottwitz-Erdődy.
- Archduke Markus Emanuel Salvator (born 2 April 1946), married Hildegard Jungmayr.
- Archduke Johann Salvator (born 18 September 1947), married Anne Marie Stummer.
- Archduke Michael Salvator (born 2 May 1949), married Baroness Eva Antonia von Hofmann.

Rosemary died on 3 May 2001 at Persenbeug Castle, Persenbeug-Gottsdorf, Lower Austria.

== Traditional titles ==
- 13 April 1904 – 25 November 1926: Her Serene Highness Princess Rosemary zu Salm-Salm, Wildgravine and Rhinegravine of Salm-Salm
- 25 November 1926 – 23 May 2001: Her Imperial & Royal Highness Archduchess Rosemary of Austria, Princess of Tuscany

== Ancestry ==
Ancestors of Princess Rosemary of Salm-Salm

16. Florentin, 4th Prince of Salm-Salm
8. Alfred, 5th Prince of Salm-Salm
17. Baroness Flaminia Rossi
4. Alfred, 7th Prince of Salm-Salm
18. Prince Ferdinand de Croÿ
9. Princess Auguste de Croÿ
19. Princesse Constance de Croÿ-Solre
2. Emanuel, Hereditary Prince of Salm-Salm
20. Hieronymus, Count von Lützow
10. Franz, Count von Lützow
21. Countess Karoline von Kolowrat-Liebsteinsky
5. Countess Rosa von Lützow
22. Henry-Augustus Seymour
11. Henriette Seymour
23. Margaret Williams
1. Princess Rosemary of Salm-Salm
24. Archduke Charles, Duke of Teschen
12. Archduke Karl Ferdinand of Austria
25. Princess Henrietta of Nassau-Weilburg
6. Archduke Friedrich, Duke of Teschen
26. Archduke Joseph, Palatine of Hungary
13. Archduchess Elisabeth Franziska of Austria
27. Duchess Maria Dorothea of Württemberg
3. Archduchess Maria Christina of Austria
28. Alfred, Duke of Croÿ
14. Rudolf, Duke of Croÿ
29. Princess Eleonore of Salm-Salm
7. Princess Isabella de Croÿ
30. Eugène, 8th Prince de Ligne
15. Princess Natalie de Ligne
31. Marquise Nathalie de Trazegnies
