= Archduke Hubert Salvator of Austria =

Austro-Tuscan royal (1894–1971)

Archduke Hubert Salvator
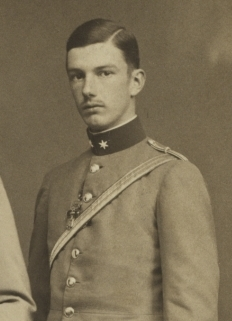
- Hubert Salvator in 1914
- Born: 30 April 1894; Schloss Lichtenegg, Wels, Upper Austria, Austria-Hungary
- Died: 24 March 1971 (aged 76); Schloss Persenbeug, Persenbeug-Gottsdorf, Lower Austria, Austria
- Spouse: Princess Rosemary of Salm-Salm (m. 1926)
- Issue Detail: Archduke Friedrich Salvator; Agnes Christina, Princess Karl Alfred of Liechtenstein; Archduchess Maria Margaretha; Archduchess Maria Ludovica; Archduchess Maria Adelheid; Elisabeth, Princess Heinrich of Auersperg-Breunner; Archduke Andreas Salvator; Josepha, Countess Clemens von Waldstein; Valerie, Margravine of Baden; Maria Alberta, Baroness Alexander von Kottwitz-Erody; Archduke Markus Emanuel Salvator; Archduke Johann Maximilian Salvator; Archduke Michael Salvator
Names
- German: Hubert Salvator Rainer Maria Joseph Ignatius
- House: Habsburg-Lorraine
- Father: Archduke Franz Salvator of Austria, Prince of Tuscany
- Mother: Archduchess Marie Valerie of Austria

Archduke Hubert Salvator of Austria, Prince of Tuscany (German: Hubert Salvator Rainer Maria Joseph Ignatius, Erzherzog von Österreich, Prinz von Toskana; 30 April 1894 – 24 March 1971) was a member of the Tuscan line of the House of Habsburg and Archduke of Austria, Prince of Tuscany by birth.

== Life ==
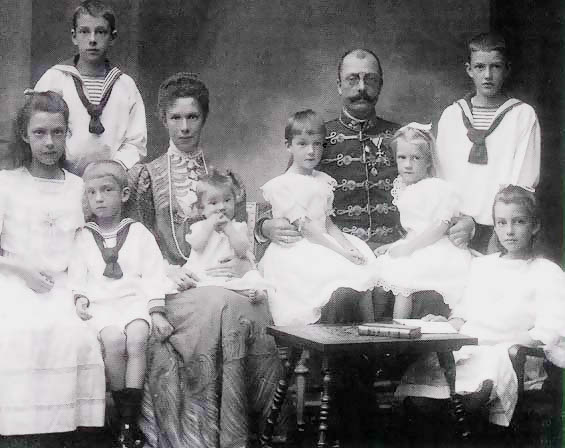
Hubert Salvator (right) with his parents and siblings (in 1905)

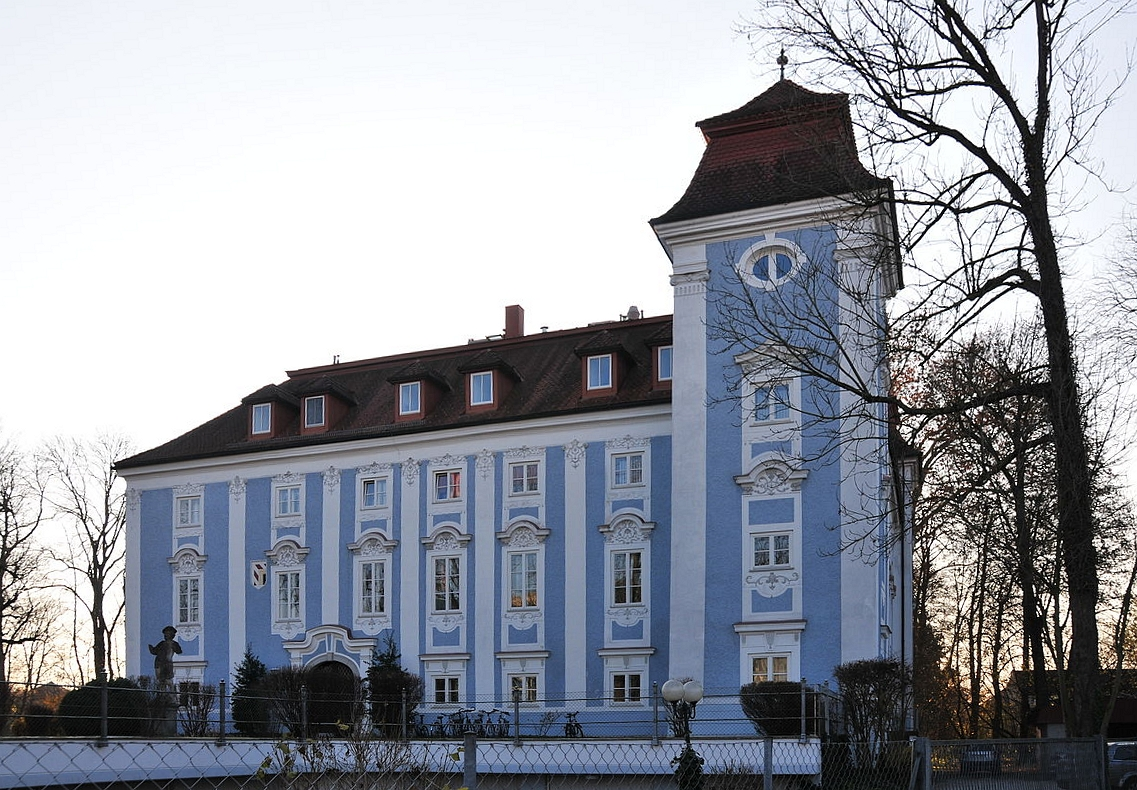
Schloss Lichtenegg

Hubert Salvator was born in Schloss Lichtenegg, Wels, Upper Austria, Austria-Hungary, the third child and second-eldest son of Archduke Franz Salvator of Austria, Prince of Tuscany and his wife Archduchess Marie Valerie of Austria. Through his mother, he was a grandson of Franz Joseph I of Austria, and through his father, he was a great-grandson of Leopold II, Grand Duke of Tuscany.

Hubert Salvator married Princess Rosemary of Salm-Salm, the second eldest child and daughter of Emanuel Alfred, Hereditary Prince of Salm-Salm and his wife Archduchess Maria Christina of Austria, on 25 November 1926 civilly at Anholt Castle in Westfalen and religiously on 26 November 1926.

=== World War One ===
During the First World War he served as an Oberleutnant and Rittmeister in Dragoon Regiment No. 4. He took part in trench warfare on Bug and Dubno. He was then a riding Ordonnanzoffizier with the 9th Gebirgsbrigadekommando in the Dolomites. In 1914 Hubert Salvator received the Order of the Golden Fleece.

From September to November 1917, on behalf of Emperor Charles I, he took over the Austrian mission to the Orient to Asia Minor, Syria and Palestine together with the Orientalist Alois Musil. The mission was intended to protect the interests of the monarchy in the Ottoman Empire, especially in competition with its ally Germany. Hubert Salvator was in charge of the mission's “representative leadership” and the head of the mission was the expert Musil. The mission, officially sent to inspect troops and maintain contact with Ottoman officials and oriental Christians, also served Emperor Charles' dream of a "religious protectorate of the Habsburgs in the Orient". Charles wanted to take over the cultural protectorate of France over the oriental Christians. The mission had economic, scientific-cultural and propaganda motives, but the military aspect was only a cover.

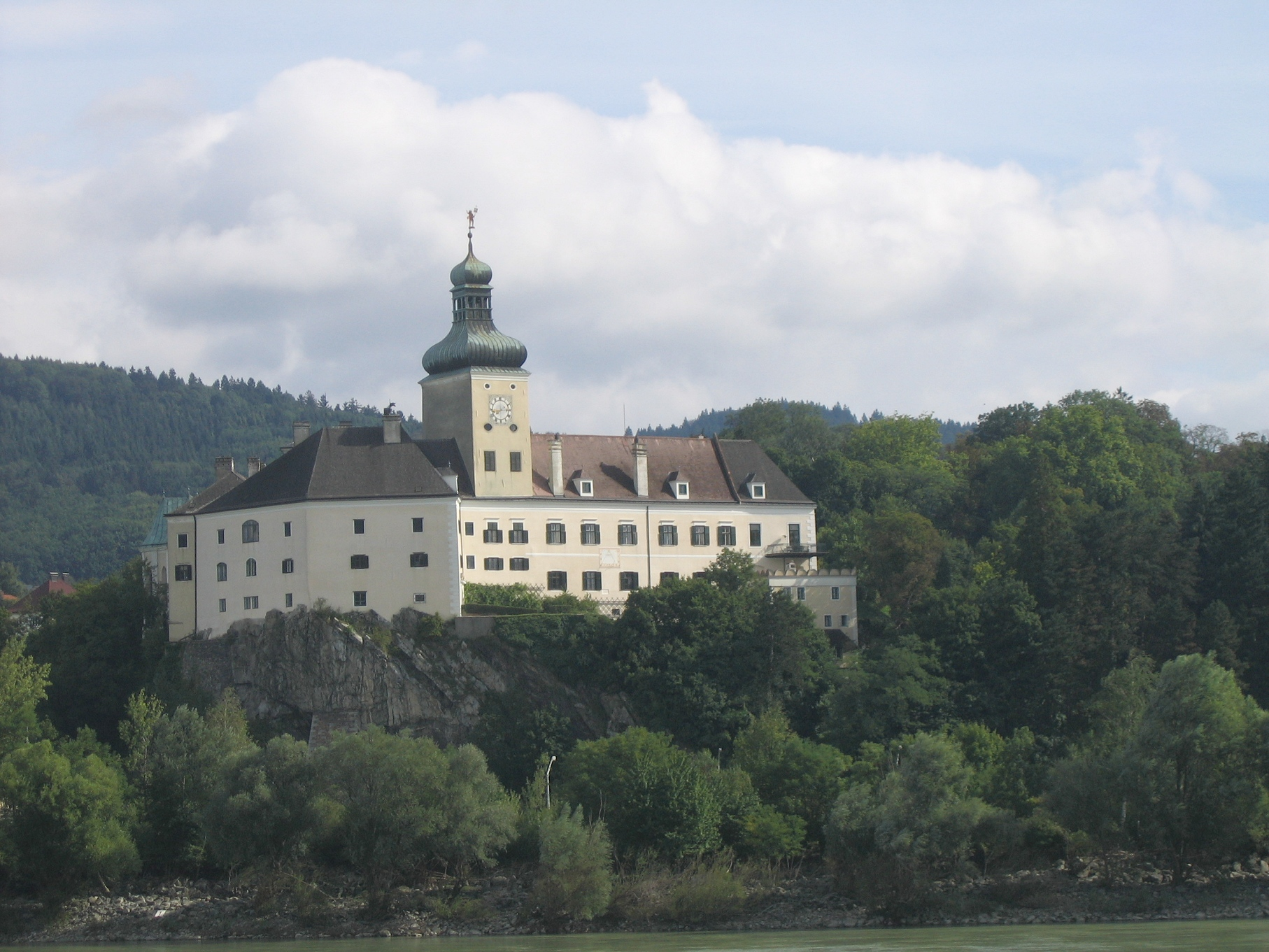
Schloss Persenbeug, Melk district in Lower Austria.

The experienced Austrian ambassador in Constantinople János von Pallavicini, who had tried in vain to prevent the mission because he feared conflict with the Ottoman government, later judged that the Archduke had correctly grasped the situation in Palestine and Syria. Feldmarschallleutnant Joseph Pomiankowski, the imperial and royal military representative in the Ottoman Empire noted that Hubert Salvator left the best impression due to his very pleasant appearance, his modest, amiable demeanor and his quiet seriousness.

=== After the end of Austria-Hungary ===
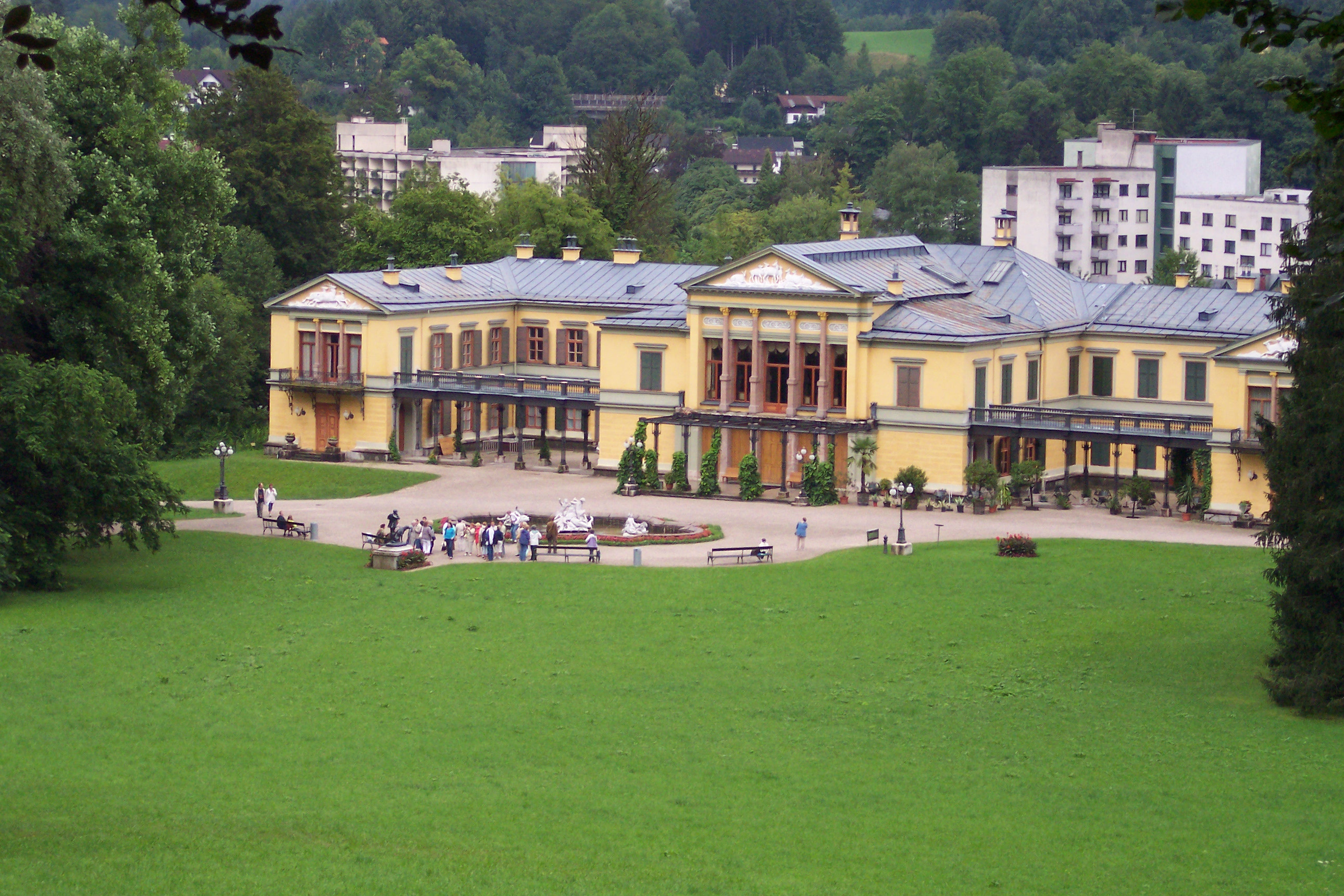
The Kaiservilla in Bad Ischl

After the end of the Habsburg Monarchy Hubert Salvator made a declaration of renunciation after the passing of the Habsburg Law in 1919 and was therefore allowed to stay in Austria. In 1920 he received his doctorate in law from the University of Innsbruck . Apparently expelled from the Order of the Golden Fleece because of the declaration of renunciation, he and his father were readmitted in November 1922.

In Persenbeug, Hubert Salvator successfully managed a large forestry operation. Because of his extensive holdings, he was nicknamed “Schleusen-Hubsi.” He inherited the Kaiservilla in Bad Ischl from his mother in 1924. During the First Republic and the Federal State Hubert Salvator was a high-ranking Heimwehr functionary as Gauführer. He was politically persecuted under National Socialist rule.

During the Soviet occupation after the Second World War, Hubert Salvator was chairman of the municipal committee of Persenbeug. He lived and ultimately died at the age of 76 at Persenbeug Castle, which he owned together with eight other Habsburg family members.

== Issue ==
Hubert Salvator and Rosemary had thirteen children together:

- Archduke Friedrich Salvator of Austria (27 November 1927 – 26 March 1999) married Countess Margarethe Kálnoky de Kőröspatak
  - Archduke Leopold Salvator of Austria (16 October 1956)
  - Archduchess Marie Bernadette of Austria (10 February 1958) married Rupert Wolff and has issue
  - Archduke Alexander Salvator of Austria (12 April 1959) married Countess Marie Gabriele von Waldstein-Wartenberg on 5 June 1993
    - Archduchess Annabella of Austria (5 September 1997)
    - Archduchess Tara of Austria (6 February 2000)
    - Archduke Constantin of Austria (4 January 2002)
    - Archduke Paul Salvator (4 November 2003)
  - Archduchess Katharina of Austria (1 November 1960) married Niall Brooks on 9 April 1988 and has issue.
- Archduchess Agnes Christina of Austria (14 December 1928 – 31 August 2007) married Prince Karl Alfred of Liechtenstein, with issue, including Princess Maria-Pia of Liechtenstein.
- Archduchess Maria Margaretha of Austria (born 29 January 1930)
- Archduchess Maria Ludovica of Austria (31 January 1931 – 17 April 1999)
- Archduchess Maria Adelheid of Austria (28 July 1933 – 10 October 2021)
- Archduchess Elisabeth Mathilde of Austria (18 March 1935 – 9 October 1998) married Prince Heinrich of Auersperg-Breunner and has issue.
- Archduke Andreas Salvator of Austria (28 April 1936) married to Maria de la Piedad Espinosa de los Monteros y Rosillo and later divorced with marriage annulled, had no issue. Married secondly to Countess Valerie Podstatzky von Lichtenstein with issue.
  - Archduke Thadeus Salvator of Austria (30 March 2001)
  - Archduke Casimir Salvator of Austria (27 July 2003)
  - Archduchess Alicia of Austria (15 February 2005)
- Archduchess Josepha Hedwig of Austria (2 September 1937) married Count Clemens von Waldstein-Wartenberg with issue.
- Archduchess Valerie Isabella of Austria (23 May 1941) married Maximilian, Margrave of Baden, with issue.
- Archduchess Maria Alberta of Austria (June 1944) married Baron Alexander von Kottwitz-Erdődy, with issue.
- Archduke Markus Emanuel Salvator of Austria (2 April 1946) married Hilda Jungmayr, with issue
- Archduke Johann Maximilian of Austria (18 September 1947) married Annemarie Stummer
  - Countess Caroline von Habsburg (12 February 1978 – 10 March 2007)
  - Countess Stephanie von Habsburg (10 July 1979) married Nikolaus von Halgbebauer with issue.
  - Countess Isabella von Habsburg (3 November 1981)
- Archduke Michael Salvator of Austria (born 2 May 1949) married Eva Antonia von Hofmann
  - Archduchess Maria Christina of Austria (9 November 1997)

== Ancestry ==
Ancestors of Archduke Hubert Salvator of Austria

8. Leopold II, Grand Duke of Tuscany
4. Archduke Karl Salvator of Austria
9. Princess Maria Antonia of the Two Sicilies
2. Archduke Franz Salvator of Austria
10. Ferdinand II of the Two Sicilies
5. Princess Maria Immaculata of Bourbon-Two Sicilies
11. Archduchess Maria Theresa of Austria
1. Archduke Hubert Salvator of Austria
12. Archduke Franz Karl of Austria
6. Franz Joseph I of Austria
13. Princess Sophie of Bavaria
3. Archduchess Marie Valerie of Austria
14. Duke Maximilian Joseph in Bavaria
7. Duchess Elisabeth in Bavaria
15. Princess Ludovika of Bavaria
