= Senegal–Ukraine relations =

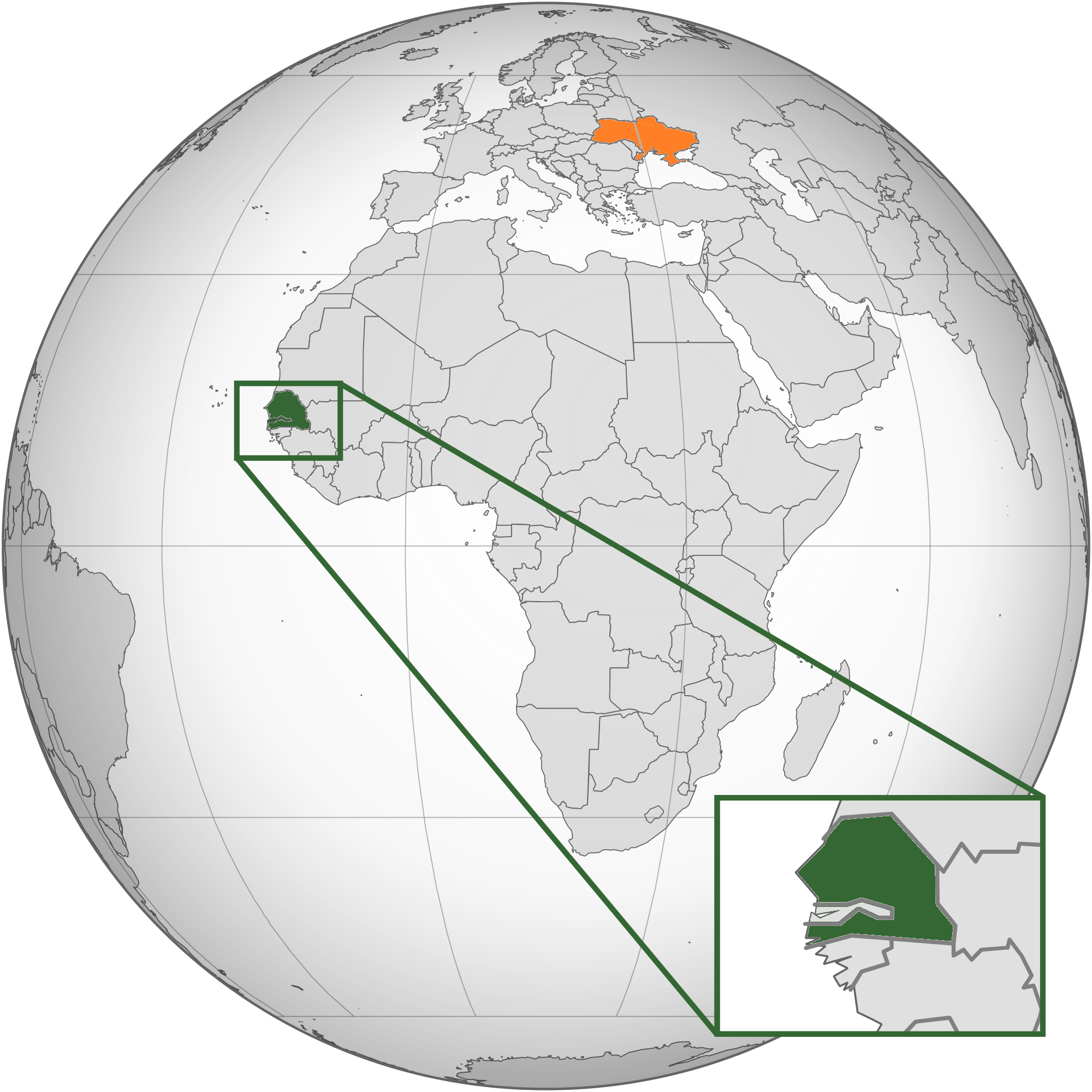
- Senegal: Ukraine

Diplomatic mission
- None (Non resident ambassador in Poland): Embassy of Ukraine, Dakar

Senegal–Ukraine relations refers to the bilateral relations between Senegal and Ukraine. Ukraine has an embassy in Dakar. Senegal has a non resident ambassador in Warsaw.

== History ==
On June 2, 1992, Senegal officially recognized Ukrainian independence, soon after on November 25, 1992, the two countries signed a joint communiqué, officially establishing diplomatic relations between Ukraine and Senegal.

Since Senegal was not part of the former Soviet sphere of influence, cooperation was relatively show in the early years.

In September 2008, Ukrainian First Deputy Minister of Foreign Affairs of Ukraine Yurii Kostenko and the Minister of State for Foreign Affairs of Senegal Cheikh Tidiane Gadio met in Dakar, marking the first meeting between the political leaderships of Ukraine and Senegal. During this meeting, the two leaders expressed interest in deepening bilateral cooperation, which was later confirmed in December 2009 during talks between the Ambassador of Ukraine and the President and Minister of Foreign Affairs of Senegal. On September 27, 2010, the first meeting of the two foreign ministers took place, where they discussed priority areas of bilateral cooperation.

On June 1, 2012, Ukraine opened its embassy in Dakar. A group of Ukrainian diplomats arrived in advance the day before, and the embassy began full operations on August 1, 2012.

On October 15, 2015, during the 2015 United Nations Security Council election, Ukraine and Senegal supported each other's candidacy for non-permanent seats on the UN Security Council.

On March 24, 2016, representatives from the two countries signed an agreement on military-technical cooperation.

In 2017, Senegal officially supported Ukraine's application for observer status in the Organization of Islamic Cooperation.

Senegal does not have an embassy in Ukraine, and instead conducts activities through its embassy in Moscow. Since 2017, its duties regarding Ukraine has switched to Senegal's embassy in Warsaw instead.

On October 30, 2019, during the 36th Ministerial Conference of La Francophonie in Monaco, Ukraine's State Secretary of the Ministry of Foreign Affairs, Andriy Zayats, met with Senegal's foreign minister, Amadou Ba, and discussed a wide range of issues regarding the countries' bilateral relations. On November 26, 2020, the second round of political consultations between the foreign ministries of Ukraine and Senegal took place at the level of directors of territorial departments.

On December 10, 2021, Senegal opened an honorary consulate in the city of Ternopil, which serves the entire Ukraine. The opening ceremony was attended by Papa Diop, the Senegalese ambassador to Poland at the time.

During the election for the 2020–2029 session of judges in the International Tribunal for the Law of the Sea, the Senegalese delegation supported the candidacy of a representative from Ukraine to become a judge.

=== Russo-Ukrainian War ===
On March 27, 2014, despite previous promises of support, Senegal abstained from Resolution 68/262 regarding the territorial integrity of Ukraine.

Throughout the Russian occupation of Crimea, the Senegalese delegation did not participate in the adoption of any UN resolutions regarding the question of Human rights in Crimea, who was absent from three of the meetings and abstained in the other two resolutions. Similarly, during the 41st session of the UN Human Rights Council in 2019, Senegal also abstained in a vote regarding assisting Ukraine in the field of human rights.

== Ambassadors ==
=== Ukraine to Senegal ===
- Andriy Zayats (June 17, 2008 – July 23, 2013): Ambassador at large, with residence in Conakry. He presented his credentials on December 29, 2009.
- Oleksandr Ovcharov (December 10, 2013 – December 7, 2018): He presented his credentials on January 6, 2015.
- Yuriy Pivovarov (April 28, 2021–present)

=== Senegal to Ukraine ===
- Amadou Dabo (June 6, 2017 —): Ambassador-at-large, with residence in Warsaw.

== High level visits ==
In June 2011, the Foreign Minister of Senegal, Madické Niang, along with other Senegalese representatives, made a visit to Ukraine. The Senegalese delegation held negotiations with the Chamber of Commerce and the Union of Industrialists and Entrepreneurs regarding economic issues. The delegation also visited the company headquarters of Kvazar and Ukrhydroenergo in Kyiv.

On February 22–23, 2013, Ukrainian Deputy Minister of Foreign Affairs, Viktor Maiko, visited Dakar on a state visit. He met with Prime Minister Abdoul Mbaye along with various business leaders in Senegal.

On June 16–17, 2013, Ukrainian Minister of Justice, Oleksandr Lavrynovych, made an official visit to Senegal. During the visit, representatives from Ukraine and Senegal signed treaties regarding legal assistance, including assistance in civil and criminal cases, transfer of convicted persons, and the extradition of offenders. Ukraine ratified the treaties on August 2, 2015.

On November 29–30, 2014, Ukrainian Foreign Minister Pavlo Klimkin visited Dakar to participate in the 15th Summit of La Francophonie. During the event, he held a number of bilateral meetings with his colleagues from various African countries, including from Senegal.

== Economic relations ==
Trade between Senegal and Ukraine
| Year | 2008 | 2009 | 2010 | 2011 | 2012 | 2013 |
|---|---|---|---|---|---|---|
| Trade volume | 60.6 | 49.3 | 59.8 | 92.0 | 89.6 | 89.2 |
| Export | 60.3 | 49.1 | 59.3 | 91.8 | 89.5 | 88.5 |
| Import | 0.2 | 0.1 | 0.5 | 0.2 | 0.1 | 0.7 |
| Balance | 60.1 | 49.0 | 58.9 | 91.6 | 89.4 | 87.8 |

During the 2010s, Senegal was one of Ukraine's main economic partners in West Africa.

In 2020, Ukrainian exports to Senegal was valued at $82.53 million USD, which is a 30% from the $117 million USD in the previous year. The main categories of exports include: rare earth metals (73.8%), animal fat and vegetable oil (13.7%), and mineral fertilizers (10.1%).

Conversely, Senegalese exports to Ukraine was valued at $3.12 million USD in 2020, a 76% increase from the $1.7 million USD of the previous year. The main exports from Senegal to Ukraine include: fish and crustaceans (54.1%), ores, slags and ash (26.5%), vegetables (8.0%), plastics and polymeric materials (5.5%), and food waste (4.5%).

In November 2020, representatives from Ukraine and Senegal met and discussed topics of bilateral cooperation, including in trade, investment, cultural and humanitarian cooperation.

Amidst the 2022–2023 global food crises brought on in part by the Russian invasion of Ukraine, Ukraine and Senegal made a series of agreement regarding agricultural products that would stabilize grain supply by creating grain storage facilities.

== Cultural relations ==
Ukrainian-Senegalese cooperation in the field of education is in its infancy, as Senegalese citizens prefer French higher education institutions. According to the Ukrainian State Center for International Education of the Ministry of Education and Science of Ukraine, during the 2019–2020 academic year, 28 students from Senegal studied at Ukrainian higher education institutions.

On December 14, 2017, the Ukrainian embassy and the regional branch of the Paris-based Centre d'Etudes Diplomatiques et Stratégiques (CEDS) organized a roundtable discussion in Dakar. The topic is about the Holodomor and is titled “The Holodomor in Ukraine in 1932–1933: A Retrospective and Lessons from History”.

== Resident diplomatic missions ==
- Senegal is accredited to Ukraine from its embassy in Warsaw, Poland.
- Ukraine has an embassy in Dakar.

== See also ==
- Foreign relations of Senegal
- Foreign relations of Ukraine
