= Prince Karl Alfred of Liechtenstein =

Prince of Liechtenstein (1910–1985)

Prince Karl Alfred
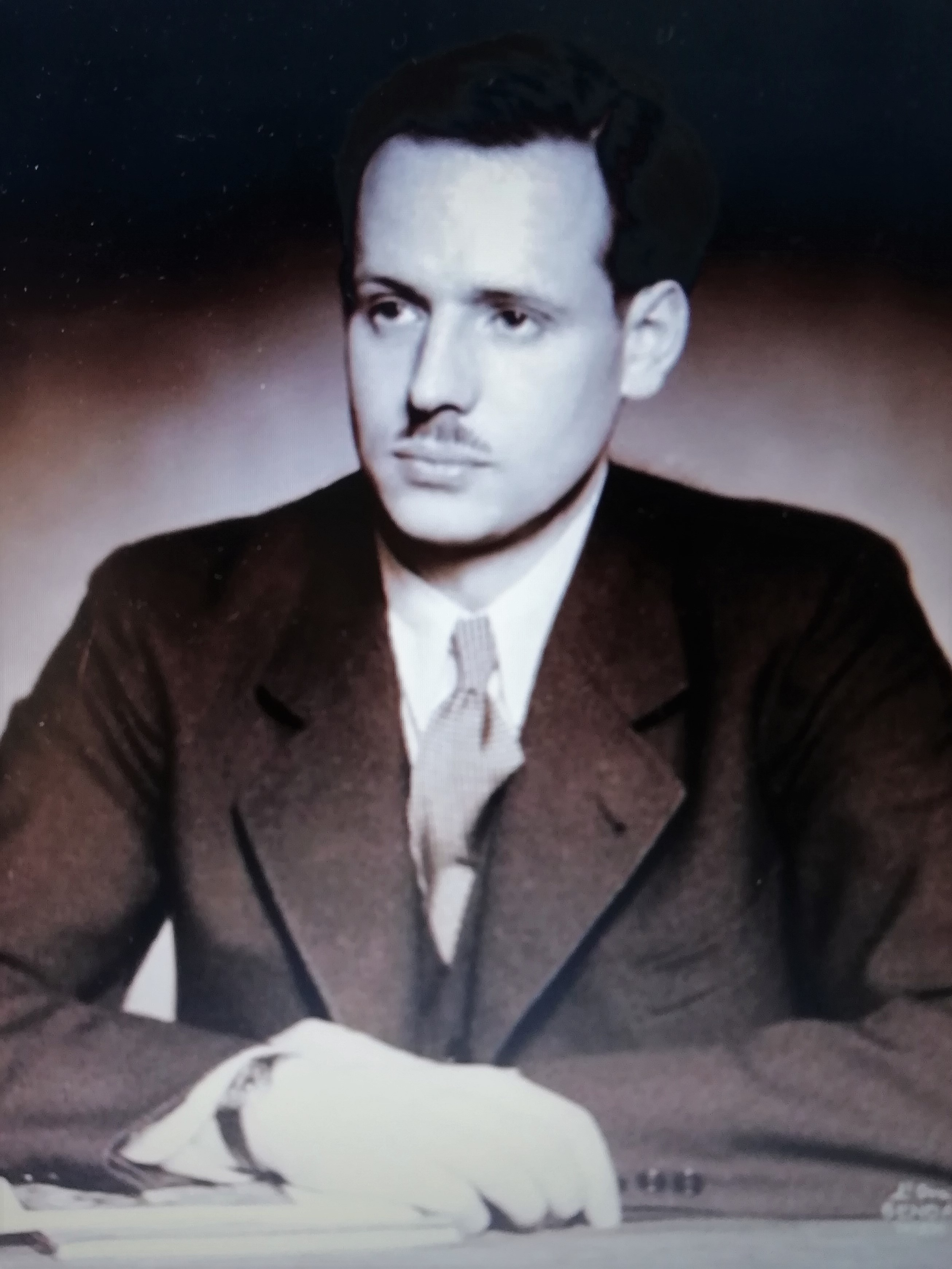
- Karl Alfred in 1943
- Born: 16 August 1910; Deutschlandsberg, Austria-Hungary
- Died: 17 November 1985 (aged 75); Bruck an der Leitha, Austria
- Spouse: Archduchess Agnes Christina of Austria (m. 1949)
- Issue: Prince Dominik; Prince Andreas; Prince Gregor; Princess Alexandra; Princess Maria Pia; Princess Katherina; Princess Brigitte
Names
- Karl Alfred Maria Johannes Baptista Heinrich Alois Georg Hartmann Ignatius
- House: Liechtenstein
- Father: Prince Alois of Liechtenstein
- Mother: Archduchess Elisabeth Amalie of Austria

Prince Karl Alfred of Liechtenstein (Karl Alfred Maria Johannes Baptista Heinrich Alois Georg Hartmann Ignatius; 16 August 1910 – 17 November 1985) was a prince and brother of Franz Joseph II. He was the third child and second son of Prince Alois of Liechtenstein and Archduchess Elisabeth Amalie of Austria.

== Marriage and issue ==
He married on 17 February 1949 at Persenbeug Castle in Austria, Archduchess Agnes Christina of Austria (14 December 1928 – 31 August 2007). She was the second child and eldest daughter of Archduke Hubert Salvator of Austria and Princess Rosemary of Salm-Salm.

They had seven children:

- Prince Dominik Volkmar Hubert Alois Maria Joseph Thaddäus Thomas Paulus Karl Ignatius Silverius (b. 20 June 1950, in Vienna – 20 September 2009, in Vienna), married at Spitz an der Donau on 9 October 1980 Eva Maria Lösch (4 July 1943, in Vienna – 24 February 1998, in Vienna), daughter of Otto Lösch and wife Hildegard Freiin von Felder, no issue
- Prince Andreas Duarte Emanuel Ulrich Benedikt Joseph Maria Karl Rafael Ignatius Mathias Paulus (b. 25 February 1952, in Vienna), married in Madrid on 29 September 1978 Silvia Prieto y Figueroa (b. 2 May 1952, in Madrid), daughter of Luis Prieto y Calle and wife Olimpia Figueroa, no issue
- Prince Gregor Heinrich Augustinus Judas Thaddäus Joseph Maria Pius Paulus Antonius Stephan Salvator (b. 18 April 1954, in Vienna), unmarried and without issue
- Princess Alexandra Maria Christina Aloisia Ulrike Henriette Agnes Ignatia Pia Gabriela Anastasia (25 December 1955, in Vienna – 27 February 1993, in Vienna), married in Vienna on 20 September 1980 and divorced in 1988 Hans Lovrek (b. 11 January 1955, in Vienna), son of Heribert Lovrek and wife Pauline Lerner, no issue
- Princess Maria Pia Ludovika Ulrika Elisabeth Paschaline Katharina Ignazia Lucia Johanna Josefa (b. 6 August 1960, in Vienna), married in Vienna on 4 August 1995 Max Alexander Kothbauer (b. 30 March 1950), had issue
- Princess Katharina Maria Christina Henriette Valerie Agnes (b. 27 January 1964, in Vienna), married firstly civilly in London on 16 November 1991 and religiously in Vienna on 30 November 1991 and divorced in 2002 Jeremy Kelton (b. 21 October 1960, in London), son of Michael Kelton and wife Joanna Peel, had issue, and married secondly in London on 3 December 2005 Andrew Duncan Gammon (b. 15 June 1958), no issue
- Princess Birgitta Ulrike Rosa Marie Elisabeth Aloisia Hermenegilde (b. 13 April 1967, in Vienna), married civilly in Vaduz on 18 December 2000 and religiously at Schloss Persenbeug on 30 December 2000 Otto Graf Jankovich-Bésán de Pribér, Vuchin et Duna-Szekcsö (b. 11 January 1967, in Bad Homburg vor der Höhe), had issue

In 1953, he and his wife were royal guests at the Coronation of Elizabeth II.

== Death ==
Prince Karl Alfred died on 17 November 1985.

== Ancestry ==
Ancestors of Prince Karl Alfred of Liechtenstein

8. Prince Franz de Paula of Liechtenstein
4. Prince Alfred of Liechtenstein
9. Countess Ewa Józefina Julia Potocka
2. Prince Alois of Liechtenstein
10. Alois II, Prince of Liechtenstein
5. Princess Henriette of Liechtenstein
11. Countess Franziska Kinsky of Wchinitz and Tettau
1. Prince Karl Alfred of Liechtenstein
12. Archduke Franz Karl of Austria
6. Archduke Karl Ludwig of Austria
13. Princess Sophie of Bavaria
3. Archduchess Elisabeth Amalie of Austria
14. Miguel I of Portugal
7. Infanta Maria Theresa of Portugal
15. Princess Adelaide of Löwenstein

Prince Karl Alfred of Liechtenstein House of Liechtenstein Born: 16 August 1910 Died: 17 November 1985
Liechtensteiner royalty
Preceded by Franz Joseph as Hereditary Prince	Heir to the throne of Liechtenstein; 1938–1945	Succeeded by Hans-Adam as Hereditary Prince
