= Otterly.ai =

Austrian software company

- Type: Private
- Industry: software
- Founded: 2024; 2 years ago
- Founders: Thomas Peham, Klaus-M. Schremser, Josef Trauner
- Headquarters: Persenbeug, Austria
- Key people: Thomas Peham, CEO
- Website: otterly.ai

Otterly.ai is an Austrian software company, founded in 2024, that provides tools for generative engine optimization, the practice of monitoring and optimizing results in large language models.

== History ==
Otterly.ai was co-founded in 2024 by Thomas Peham, Klaus-M. Schremser and Josef Trauner. The concept for OtterlyAI was developed in response to the increasing use of generative AI tools in digital search and content discovery. The company announced a technology partnership with SEO platform Semrush in January 2025.
