= Pivovar =

Pivovar means brewer in several Slavic languages. It is a surname and a generic name for breweries. It may refer to

== Persons ==
- Steve Pivovar (1952–2016), also known as Piv Pivovar, American sports journalist

== Business ==
- Pivovar Eggenberg, a Czech brewery
- Pivovar Kocour Varnsdorf, a Czech brewery
- Pivovar Waco, a Czech brewery

== Sports ==
- FC Pivovar Veľký Šariš, a Slovak football team

== See also ==
- Pivovarov
