= Caetano Luís Pequito de Almeida Sampaio =

Portuguese diplomat (born 1957)

His Excellency Luís de Almeida Sampaio
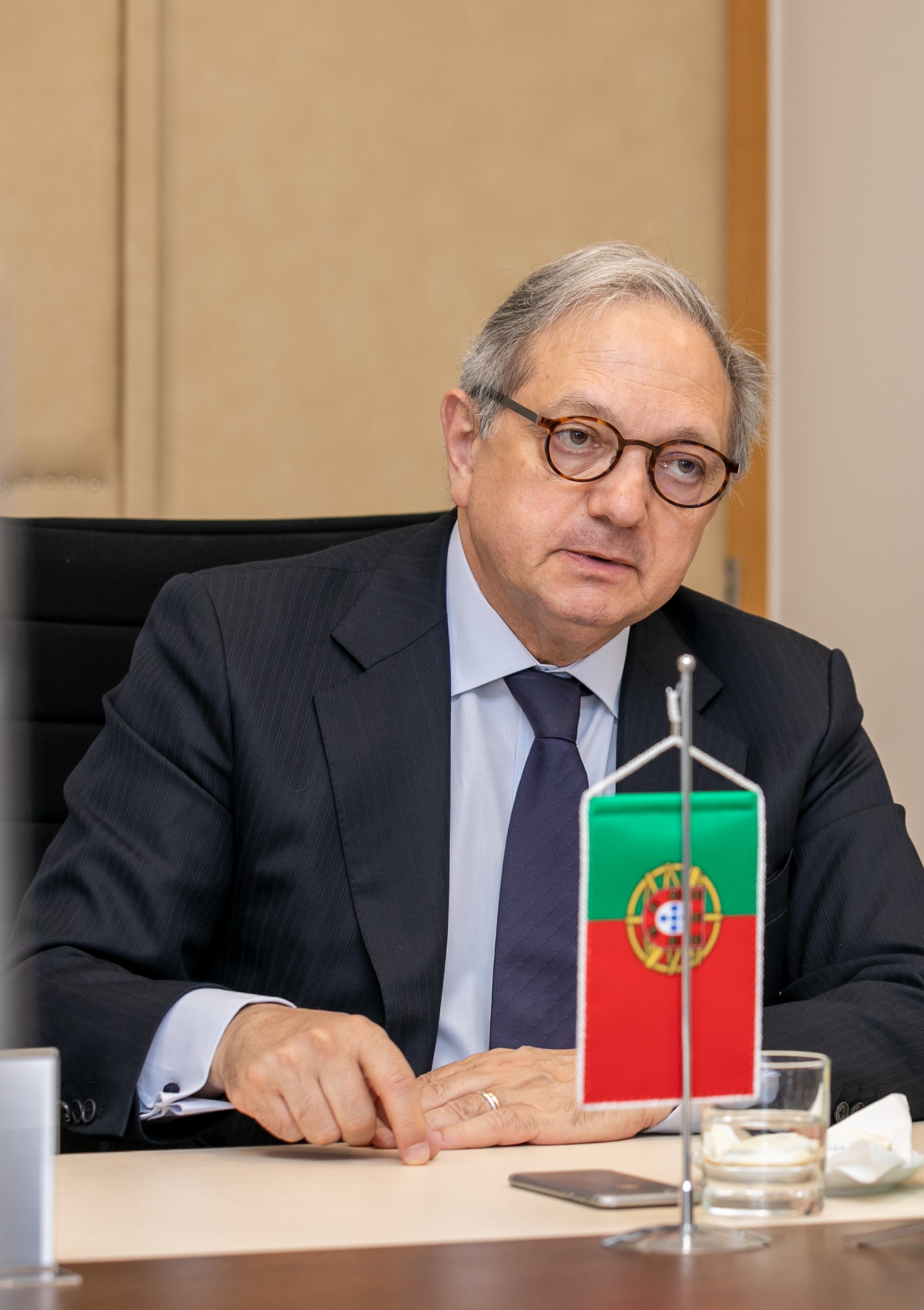

Portuguese Ambassador to Prague
- In office October 2019 – Present
- President: Marcelo Rebelo de Sousa

Permanent Representative of Portugal to NATO
- In office September 2015 – September 2019 (4 years)
- President: Aníbal Cavaco Silva

Portuguese Ambassador to Berlin
- In office April 2012 – September 2015 (3 years, 5 months)
- President: Aníbal Cavaco Silva

Portuguese Ambassador to Belgrade
- In office November 2008 – March 2012 (3 years, 4 months)
- President: Aníbal Cavaco Silva

Portuguese Ambassador to Algiers
- In office September 2004 – November 2008 (4 years, 2 months)
- President: Jorge Sampaio

Personal details
- Born: Caetano Luís Pequito de Almeida Sampaio; 16 December 1957 (age 68) Porto, Portugal
- Spouse: Maria Salomé de Almeida Sampaio
- Education: University of Coimbra

Luís de Almeida Sampaio (Portuguese pronunciation: [luˈiʒ ðɨ alˈmɐjðɐ sɐ̃ˈpaju]) (born Caetano Luís Pequito de Almeida Sampaio, December 16, 1957 in Porto, Portugal) is a Portuguese career diplomat. He currently serves as the Portuguese Ambassador to Prague.

== Early life and academic career ==
Luís de Almeida Sampaio was born and raised in Porto, Portugal, to Maria Luísa de Almeida Sampaio (née Marques Pequito), a medical doctor and to Caetano Pinto de Almeida Sampaio, a civil servant with a long time career in social security and health public services.

His childhood was mainly spent in his native city where he attended primary and secondary school. During his primary school years he attended Escola Particular do Centro Social e Paroquial de Nossa Senhora da Conceição, a period he often mentions as being responsible for some of the most important things he has learned throughout his life, particularly due to his teacher, Aníbal Rocha.

He started his secondary studies in Liceu Alexandre Herculano in Porto before being transferred to Liceu António Nobre during the time of the Carnation Revolution in 1974. That was a particularly important period for Luís de Almeida Sampaio because, as a young man interested in politics, he was one of the founders of Juventude Centrista (a predecessor of the current Juventude Popular or People's Youth) in Porto.

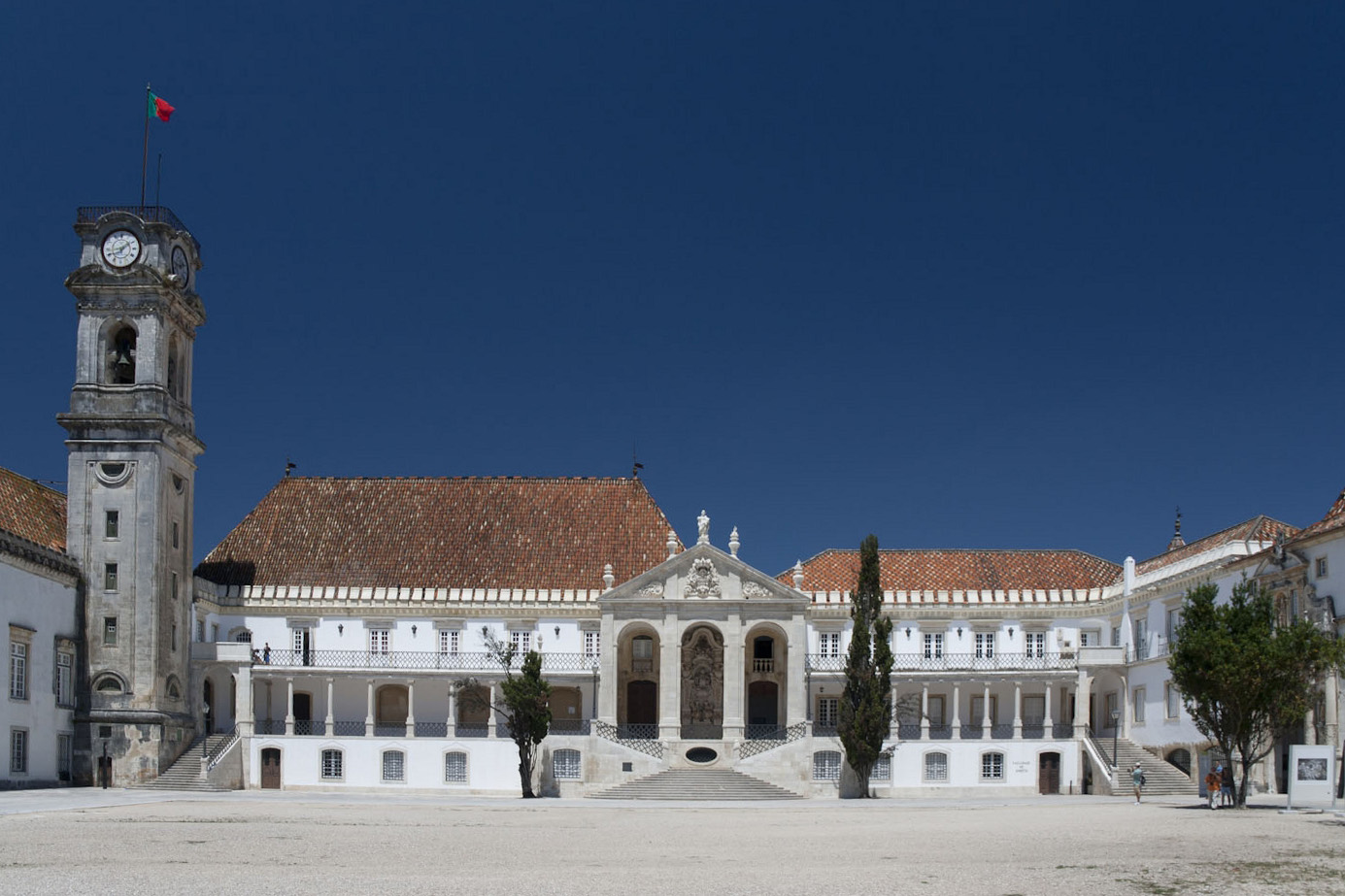
Coimbra University tower building

He went on to graduate from the University of Coimbra in Portugal in 1982 with a law degree. During the years spent there, Luís de Almeida Sampaio established a close and lasting friendship with a prominent Jesuit priest, António Vaz Pinto (who later, alongside another very well known Portuguese Jesuit priest, Vasco Pinto de Magalhães, would come to officiate his marriage and baptise his two daughters), who was the first Jesuit priest to be chaplain of the University since Sebastião José de Carvalho e Melo, 1st Marquess of Pombal expelled the order from Portugal in 1759.

From that period he also recalls Professor António Castanheira Neves due to a curious situation in which Luís de Almeida Sampaio enrolled in the class of Metodologia Jurídica under Castanheira Neves and he was the only student to do so that year. Furthermore, his political thinking was profoundly influenced by one of Castanheira Neves’ books, Questão-de facto – questão-de-direito ou o problema metodológico da juridicidade.

In 1983, while preparing for the diplomatic service concours, he attended the course Cycle d’Histoire du XXeme Siècle at the Abbey of Prémontrés in Pont-à-Mousson, Lorraine, France, organized by the Institut d'études politiques de Paris (commonly known as Sciences Po).

== Diplomatic career ==
Luís de Almeida Sampaio joined the diplomatic service at the Ministry of Foreign Affairs of Portugal in 1983 and in 1984 became an Embassy attaché.

=== 1987–1997: Brussels ===
In 1987 he was appointed to Portuguese Delegation to NATO (DELNATO) in Brussels, Belgium. Between 1990 and 1993, in a time coinciding with the aftermath of the fall of the Berlin Wall and the collapse of the Soviet Union, he served as deputy-director to the Cabinet of then Secretary General of NATO, Manfred Wörner.

In 1995 he was appointed diplomatic and political advisor to João de Deus Pinheiro, former Portuguese foreign minister and, at the time, European Commissioner for International Cooperation, Humanitarian Aid and Crisis Response in the Santer Commission and responsible for the Cooperation with the ACP countries (African, Caribbean and Pacific Group of States). The Chief of Cabinet of Commissioner Pinheiro was at that time Carlos Costa who currently serves as governor of the Bank of Portugal.

As Advisor to Deus Pinheiro, one of Luís de Almeida Sampaio's main tasks was to participate in the set up of the first European Commission Conflict Prevention guidelines. Specifically on this subject matter, he had the occasion, at the European Congress on Conflict Prevention in Amsterdam, Netherlands, in 1997, to publicly outline his thinking, namely the idea of political stability as essential to security in the sense that, whereas at the time stability was an idea intrinsically linked with social and economic development, political stability as well as sustainability were paramount to an environment of security and an essential condition both for development as well as for conflict prevention : “Sampaio stressed that stability (a core concept of security policy) embraced the notion of dynamism” . This was during a time when the discussion around the EU’s capacity as a provider of security in military and humanitarian interventions was at a high, driven mainly by the events of the 1990s in Rwanda.

=== 1998–1999: Bosnia and Herzegovina ===
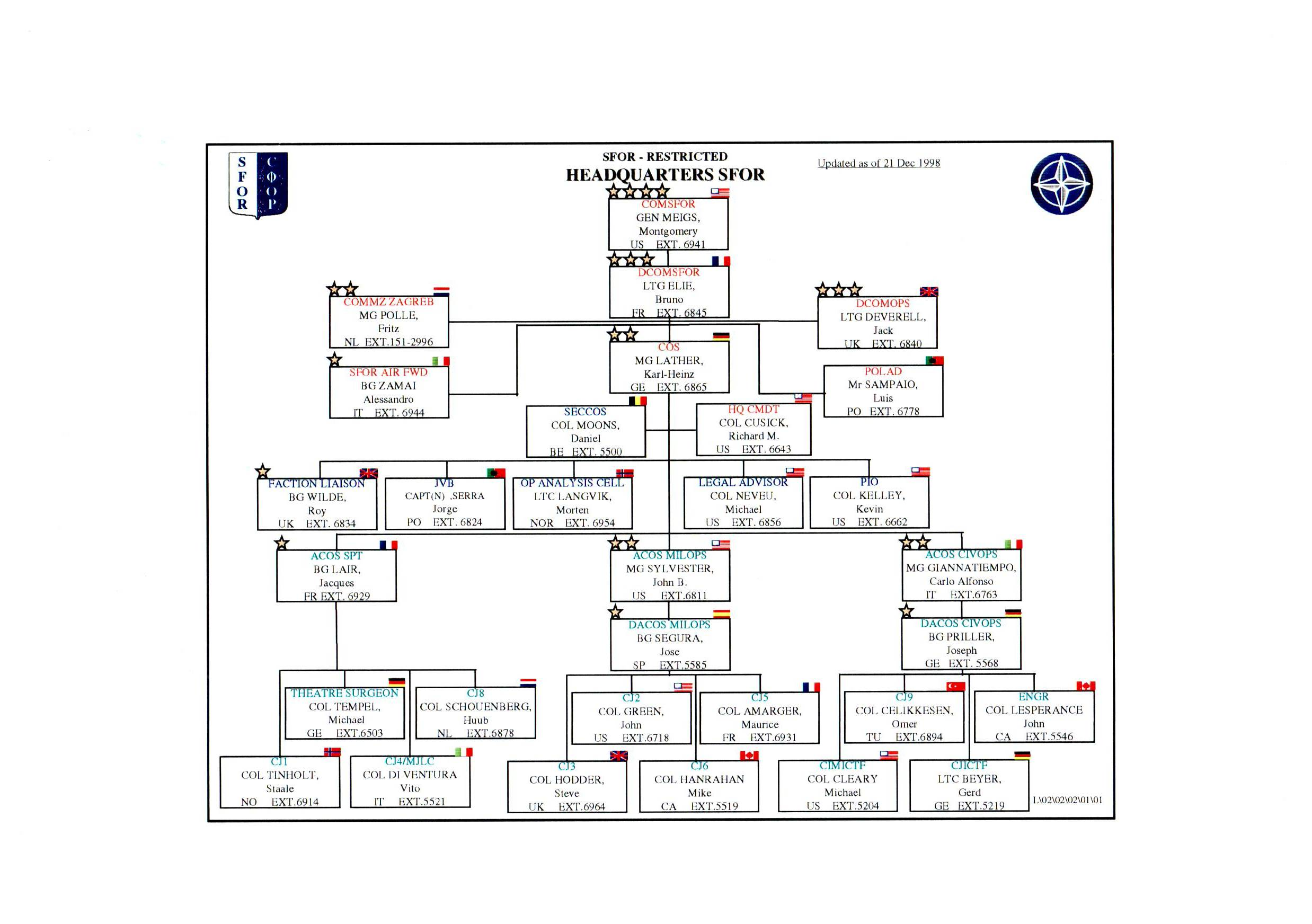
SFOR's Command structure with Luís de Almeida Sampaio as POLAD

Between 1998 and 1999, a period marked by the Kosovo War and NATO's bombing of the Federal Republic of Yugoslavia, he was assigned as Political Advisor (POLAD) to the Commander of NATO Stabilization Force (SFOR) in Bosnia and Herzegovina during the one-year terms of US General Eric Shinseki and US General Montgomery Meigs, both of which were serving under the authority of US General Wesley Clark, Supreme Allied Commander Europe (SACEUR) from 1997 to 2000.

His time in Bosnia and Herzegovina led him to conclude that the Dayton Agreements would only be fully implemented if and when Bosnia and Herzegovina would be able to surmount what he identified as “double dependency syndrome” : the international organisations present in Bosnia had come to be dependent on SFOR as much as the Bosnian people had come to be dependent on the international community and its support. He had the opportunity to develop this concept at an OSCE Seminar held in Sofia, Bulgaria, on “Cooperation among International Organisations and Institutions: Experience and Prospects in South-Eastern Europe” on May 17, 1999: “Mr. Luis Sampaio, Political Advisor with NATO/SFOR, noted that civilian and military implementation showed a fundamental difference of pace. SFOR is the best example of the new NATO. Any SFOR success or failure will affect NATO, and the longer SFOR stays in Bosnia the greater the perception of failure. We need an exit strategy for SFOR and agreement on what conditions would allow its departure. International organisations and the people of Bosnia and Herzegovina themselves have become dependent on SFOR”.

=== 1999–2004: Luanda and presidency of IPAD ===
In 1999 he was appointed as Minister-Counselor to the Portuguese Embassy in Luanda, Angola, a position he held until 2002. During his post in Luanda, marked by the death of UNITA’s Angolan rebel leader, Jonas Savimbi, and the final days of the Angolan Civil War, Luís de Almeida Sampaio was a member of the Portuguese delegation (comprising the “troika for peace” with the United States of America and Russia) responsible for the signing of the Memorandum of Understanding as an addendum to the Lusaka Protocol.

In January 2003 Luís de Almeida Sampaio was nominated the first president of IPAD – Instituto Português de Apoio ao Desenvolvimento, I.P, by the Portuguese Government. During his presidency, he defended that the cooperation for development was and should be an instrument of the Portuguese foreign policy due to Portugal's strategic objectives and presence in the countries benefiting from this policy.

=== 2004-present: head of mission ===
As Head of Mission, Luís de Almeida Sampaio was first appointed Portuguese ambassador to Algiers, Algeria, from 2004 to 2008. During this period, more precisely during the 2007 Portuguese presidency of the European Union, he served as coordinator for the Middle East Peace Process (MEPP) in the Israeli-Palestinian conflict. As coordinator, Luís de Almeida Sampaio organized a meeting of the Quartet on the Middle East (comprising the United States of America, the European Union, the United Nations and Russia) in Lisbon in 2007 and participated in the 2007 Annapolis Conference and travelled extensively throughout the Middle East.” Almeida Sampaio said at the time about the need of designing and reaching an everlasting solution for the issue of the Middle East: “Never before has the problem of peace in the Middle East become such a matter of immediate, common and everyday concern in the consciousness of the international public opinion, particularly in the European one.”

From 2008 to 2012 he served as Portuguese Ambassador to Belgrade, Serbia, as well as being accredited as non-resident Ambassador to Podgorica, Montenegro, and to Skopje, Macedonia.

Luís de Almeida Sampaio served as Portuguese ambassador to Germany between 2012 and 2015, having presented his diplomatic credentials to President Joachim Gauck in Berlin on April 13, 2012.

From September 2015 until October 2019, Almeida Sampaio held the ambassadorial post of Permanent Representative of Portugal in the North Atlantic Council.

As of October 2019, Luís de Almeida Sampaio serves as Portuguese Ambassador to Prague, Czech Republic.

== Personal life ==
Almeida Sampaio is married to Maria Salomé de Almeida Sampaio (née Albuquerque Matos, born May 24, 1960, in Oporto, Portugal). They have two daughters: Carolina de Almeida Sampaio (born April 13, 1988, in Porto, Portugal) and Francisca de Almeida Sampaio (born September 4, 1990, in Brussels, Belgium).
