= Princess Maria-Pia of Liechtenstein =

Princess of Liechtenstein and diplomat (born 1960)

Her Serene Highness Princess Maria-Pia
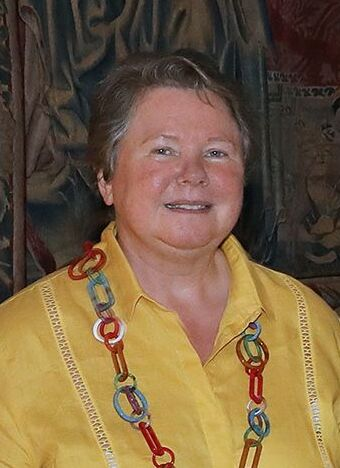
- Her Serene Highness in 2024

Ambassador and Head of Delegation to the Organization on Security and Co-operation in Europe (OSCE)
- Incumbent
- Assumed office December 1997

Ambassador of Liechtenstein to Austria
- Incumbent
- Assumed office July 2000

Permanent Representative of Liechtenstein to the United Nations
- Incumbent
- Assumed office April 2011

Ambassador of Liechtenstein to the Czech Republic
- Incumbent
- Assumed office April 2011

Ambassador of Liechtenstein to Belgium and to the European Union
- In office August 1996 – 1997

Representative of the Principality of Liechtenstein in Brussels
- In office 1993–1996

Personal details
- Born: 6 August 1960 (age 66) Vienna, Austria
- Spouse: Max Kothbauer (m. 1995)
- Children: Hieronymous Kothbauer
- Parent(s): Prince Karl Alfred of Liechtenstein; Archduchess Agnes Christina of Austria
- Education: Columbia University

Princess Maria-Pia of Liechtenstein (Maria-Pia Ludovika Ulrika Elisabeth Paschaline Katharina Ignazia Lucia Johanna Josefa; born 6 August 1960), also known as Maria-Pia Kothbauer, is Liechtensteiner diplomat and a member of the Princely family of Liechtenstein. She serves as the Ambassador Extraordinary and Plenipotentiary of Liechtenstein to Austria and the Czech Republic, formerly also to Belgium and the European Union. She also serves as Liechtenstein's Permanent Representative to the Organization for Security and Co-operation in Europe and to the United Nations.

== Personal life ==
Born in Vienna, Princess Maria-Pia is the fifth child and second daughter of Prince Karl Alfred of Liechtenstein and Archduchess Agnes Christina of Austria. A member of the Princely Family of Liechtenstein, she is a first cousin of the present monarch, Prince Hans-Adam II. Her paternal grandparents were Prince Alois of Liechtenstein and Archduchess Elisabeth Amalie of Austria. Her maternal grandparents were Archduke Hubert Salvator of Austria and Princess Rosemary of Salm-Salm. On 4 August 1995, she married Max Alexander Kothbauer, then vice president of Creditanstalt-Bankverein and later vice president of the Oesterreichische Nationalbank (OeNB). The couple's only child, a son named Hieronymus, was born on 26 January 1997.

== Education and career ==
Princess Maria-Pia graduated from the Schule der Dominikanerinnen, run by Dominican nuns, in Vienna in 1978. She then enrolled in Columbia University, attaining the degree of Master of Arts in Political Science.

From 1984 until 1986, she worked for the United Nations High Commissioner for Refugees, and then from 1987 until 1988 for the Foreign Department of Caritas in Vienna. Since 1989, Princess Maria-Pia has been in diplomatic service of the Principality of Liechtenstein, and started working for the Embassy of Liechtenstein in Vienna in 1990. From 1993 until 1996, she served as Liechtenstein's Ambassador to Belgium and the European Union.

In August 1996, she became Permanent Representative of the Principality of Liechtenstein in Vienna, as well as Ambassador and Head of Delegation to the Organization for Security and Co-operation in Europe (OSCE), where she is the longest-serving ambassador. In December next year, Liechtenstein assumed the office of Ambassador Extraordinary and Plenipotentiary of Liechtenstein to Austria. Since July 2000, she has served as Permanent Representative of Liechtenstein to the United Nations. In April 2011, she became Ambassador Extraordinary and Plenipotentiary of Liechtenstein to the Czech Republic. She resides in Vienna.

Liechtenstein speaks German, English and French, and has basic knowledge of Spanish.

== Gallery ==
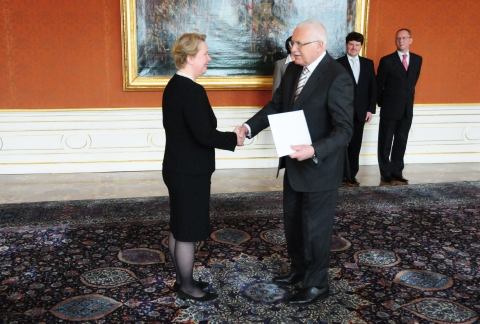
Kothbauer presenting her credentials to Václav Klaus, President of the Czech Republic

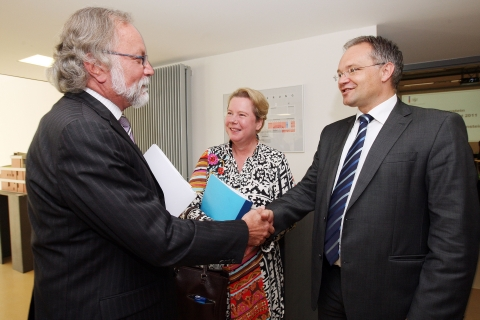
Kothbauer with Michael Reiterer and Klaus Tschütscher in 2011

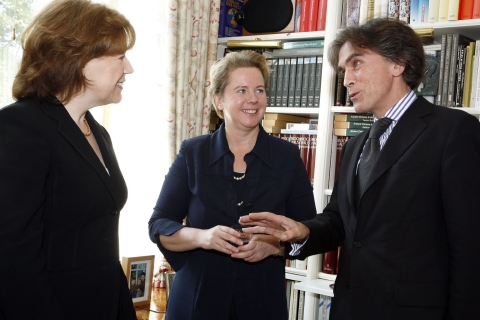
Kothbauer with Rita Kieber-Beck and Emil Brix in 2006

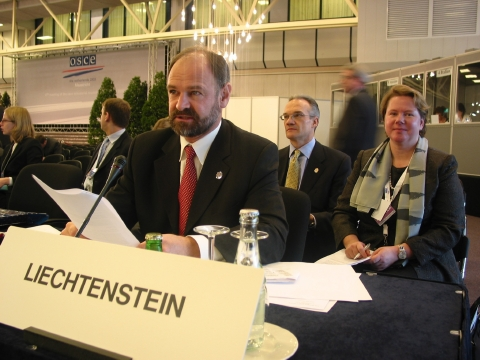
Kothbauer and Ernst Walch in December 2002

== See also ==
- Official CV of the Ambassador on the website of the Government of the Principality of Liechtenstein.
- Foundation Board - Liechtenstein Foundation for State Governance on the official website of the foundation.
- Prince Stefan of Liechtenstein - Liechtenstein's Ambassador Extraordinary and Plenipotentiary to the Holy See
- Prince Nikolaus of Liechtenstein - Former Liechtenstein's Ambassador Extraordinary and Plenipotentiary to the Holy See
