= António Castanheira Neves =

Portuguese legal philosopher (born 1929)

António Castanheira Neves (born 8 November 1929 in Tábua) is a Portuguese legal philosopher and a professor emeritus at the law faculty of the University of Coimbra.

According to Castanheira Neves, law can only be understood through legal problems (roughly, legal cases), which have to be solved within the legal system (including a necessary connection to morality). Law, he claims, is not something given or previous, but the solution to legal problems. Legal problems are the decisive starting point. His opposition to positivism, to natural law and to the several theories of legal syllogism would make him one of the first and most accomplished advocates of interpretivism.

Castanheira Neves, however, has always claimed that law — the task of lawyers — is not essentially interpretive or hermeneutical, but practical, i.e., action guiding. He maintains that legal interpretation is not a necessary feature of legal reasoning. On the contrary, law always arises from legal problems, which are concrete, historically situated, normative, and practical. Every legal decision aims to settle what someone (legally) ought to do in a particular case in a particular historical (and social) situation, and that is its defining feature. A legal decision is also itself an action. Interpretation is not always needed and, when it is, it is auxiliary.

The central tenets of Castanheira Neves' philosophy of law were made clear in his 1967 massive book on the philosophical and methodological distinction between matter of fact and matter of law. Castanheira Neves addresses the similarities and significant differences between his and Dworkin's theses in the last part of his 2003 book.

Castanheira Neves also claims that there is no law in general norms (rules, principles, etc.) as laid down by legislators, but only in solving particular cases. To this thesis, he calls "jurisprudentialism".

Law is not an element, but a synthesis, not a premise for validity, but fulfilled validity, not a prius, but a posterius, not a given, but a solution, it is not in the beginning, but in the end. (Castanheira Neves, 1967, p. 586)

In this, he was preceded by authors like Viehweg and schools of thought like critical legal studies, but he differed from these authors as he claimed it to be essential to law as a normative matter, and not only descriptively. His position is therefore equivalent, in this subject, to J. Dancy's later moral particularism. Castanheira Neves would come to agree with Gadamer's dictum that all interpretation is application (as Dworkin did).

== Major works ==
- (1967) Questão-de-facto — questão-de-direito ou o problema metodológico da juridicidade, Coimbra: Almedina. Matter of fact / matter of law, or the methodological problem of legality.
- (1983) O instituto dos "assentos" e a função jurídica dos supremos tribunais, Coimbra: offprint of RLJ. The institute of "assentos" and the legal function of supreme courts, first published between 1973 and 1982.
- (1993) Metodologia jurídica. Problemas fundamentais, Coimbra: Coimbra Editora, 1993. Legal methodology / Fundamental problems.
- (1995) Digesta: escritos acerca do direito, do pensamento jurídico, da sua metodologia e outros, 2 vols., Coimbra: Coimbra Editora. Digesta is a collection of works first published between 1968 and 1994, including:
  - (1976) A revolução e o direito (Revolution and law),
  - (1979) A unidade do sistema jurídico (The unity of the legal system), and
  - (1982) Fontes do direito (Sources of the law).
- (2003) O actual problema metodológico da interpretação jurídica, Coimbra: Coimbra Editora. The present day methodological problem of legal interpretation.
