= Pivovarov =

Pivovarov (Russian: Пивоваров, from пивовар meaning brewer) is a Russian masculine surname, its feminine counterpart is Pivovarova. It may refer to:

- Alexey Pivovarov (born 1974), Russian journalist
- Anastasia Pivovarova (born 1990), Russian tennis player
- Artem Pyvovarov (born 1991), Ukrainian new wave singer
- Olga Pivovarova (born 1956), Soviet rower
- Polina Pivovarova, Belarusian racing cyclist
- Sasha Pivovarova (born 1985), Russian model and actress
- Viktor Pivovarov (born 1937), Russian artist
- Yuriy Pivovarov (born 1962), Ukrainian diplomat
