= Jorge de Camões =

East Timorese diplomat

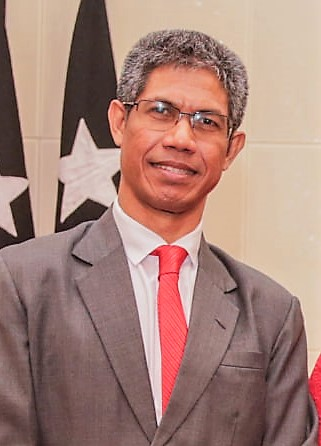
Jorge de Camões in 2019

Jorge Trindade Neves de Camões (born February 18, 1969, in Lautém) is an East Timorese diplomat who currently serves as ambassador to Brussels with concurrent accreditations to the European Union and other countries. He was a student activist and member of the Conselho Nacional de Resistência Timorese (CNRT) who campaigned to resist Indonesian invasion of East Timor.

== Education ==
Camões had his primary school in Dili and secondary school in Baucau. He earned a bachelor's degree in Social and Cultural Philosophy from the Driyarkara School of Philosophy in 1996.

== Career ==
In 2001, Camões joined newly established Ministry of Foreign Affairs as one of the pioneer staff in preparation for East Timor's independence kick starting his diplomatic career. He then trained in the English language, International Diplomacy, Human Rights and Information Technology in several countries including South Korea, Malaysia, Indonesia, Australia and Norway.

He was posted to East Timorese Embassy in Jakarta, Indonesia for his first foreign posting as first secretary and later redeployed to East Timorese Embassy in Washington, DC as Charge d'Affaires ad interim in 2007. On 6 July 2012, he was appointed first East Timorese ambassador to Vietnam and served there until 2018. In 2019, he was appointed secretary general of the Ministry of Foreign Affairs of East Timor. He was posted to the Belgium as East Timor ambassador in 2021 with concurrent accreditations to the European Union, Germany, Austria, Luxembourg, Poland, France, and the Czech Republic.
