= Assento =

Rules in Portuguese law up to 1982

In Portuguese law, the assentos (literally, settlements) were general obligatory rules expressed in some of the decisions of the Supreme Court of Justice. Unlike precedents, the assentos had the form of a general rule. Unlike statutory legislation, the assentos were made by a court and after a concrete case was presented before the court.

The assentos were declared unconstitutional by the Constitutional Court, after the 1982 constitutional revision and no longer exist in Portuguese law.
