= Yuriy Pivovarov =

Ukrainian diplomat (born 1962)

- Пивоваров Юрій Анатолійович
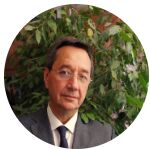
- Pivovarov in 2022

Ambassador Extraordinary of Ukraine to Senegal, Guinea, Cote d'Ivoire, Liberia, and Guinea-Bissau
- In office April 28, 2021 – February 2, 2026
- Preceded by: Oleksandr Ovcharov

Personal details
- Born: July 28, 1962 (age 64) Bila Tserkva, Kyiv Oblast, Ukrainian SSR (now Ukraine)

Yuriy Anatolyevich Pivovarov (Ukr: Пивоваров Юрій Анатолійович) is a Ukrainian diplomat who served as ambassador plenipotentiary of Ukraine to Senegal from 2021 to 2026.

== Biography ==
Pivovarov was born on July 6, 1962, in Bila Tserkva, Kyiv Oblast, Ukrainian SSR, Soviet Union. He is the nephew of Valeriy Pivovarov, the Ambassador Plenipotentiary of Ukraine to Guinea from 1993 to 1998, and renowned Ukrainian basketball player Inesa Pivovarova. His son, Yehor Pivovarov, was the Ukrainian ambassador to Belgium in 2021. Between 2018 and 2020, Pivovarov served as the deputy director of the Middle East and Africa sector of Ukraine's Ministry of Foreign Affairs.

On April 28, 2021, Pivovarov was appointed by President Volodymyr Zelenskyy as the Ambassador Extraordinary of Ukraine to Senegal. His credentials were accepted by Senegalese president Macky Sall in November 2021. At the outbreak of the Russian invasion of Ukraine on February 24, 2022, Pivovarov gave an interview with the Senegalese newspaper Le Soleil. In March 2022, the Senegalese government protested a social media call by the Ukrainian government calling on Senegalese to join Ukraine's fight against Russia. On May 4, 2022, he was appointed ambassador extraordinary of Ukraine to Guinea, Ivory Coast, and Liberia.

In 2024, the Senegalese government chastised Pivovarov for posting a video of Ukraine's support of the Azawad Liberation Front's attacks at the Battle of Tinzaouaten. Russian-funded media and Russian diplomats in the Alliance of Sahel States - Mali, Burkina Faso, and Niger - encouraged Senegal to break off relations with Ukraine.

On February 2, 2026, Pivovarov was dismissed.
