= Ambassador =

Diplomatic envoy

An ambassador is an official envoy, especially a high-ranking diplomat who represents a state and is usually accredited to another sovereign state or to an international organization as the resident representative of their own government or sovereign; or appointed for a special and often temporary diplomatic assignment. The word is also used informally for people who are known, without national appointment, to represent certain professions, activities, and fields of endeavor, such as sales.

An ambassador is the ranking government representative stationed in a foreign capital or country. The host country typically allows the ambassador control of specific territory called an embassy (which may include an official residence and an office, chancery, located together or separately, generally in the host nation's capital), whose territory, staff, and vehicles are generally afforded diplomatic immunity in the host country. Under the Vienna Convention on Diplomatic Relations, an ambassador has the highest diplomatic rank. Countries may choose to maintain diplomatic relations at a lower level by appointing a chargé d'affaires in place of an ambassador.

The equivalent to an ambassador exchanged among members of the Commonwealth of Nations are known as high commissioners. The ambassadors of the Holy See are known as apostolic nuncios.

== Etymology ==
The term is derived from Middle English ambassadour, via Anglo-Norman ambassateur, originally borrowed from Gaulish ambaxtos, reconstructed as PIE *h₂m̥bʰi "around" + *h₂eǵ- "to drive". From the same source is Old High German ambaht "service", whence modern German Amt "office". The first known usage of the term was recorded around the 14th century.

== Purposes ==
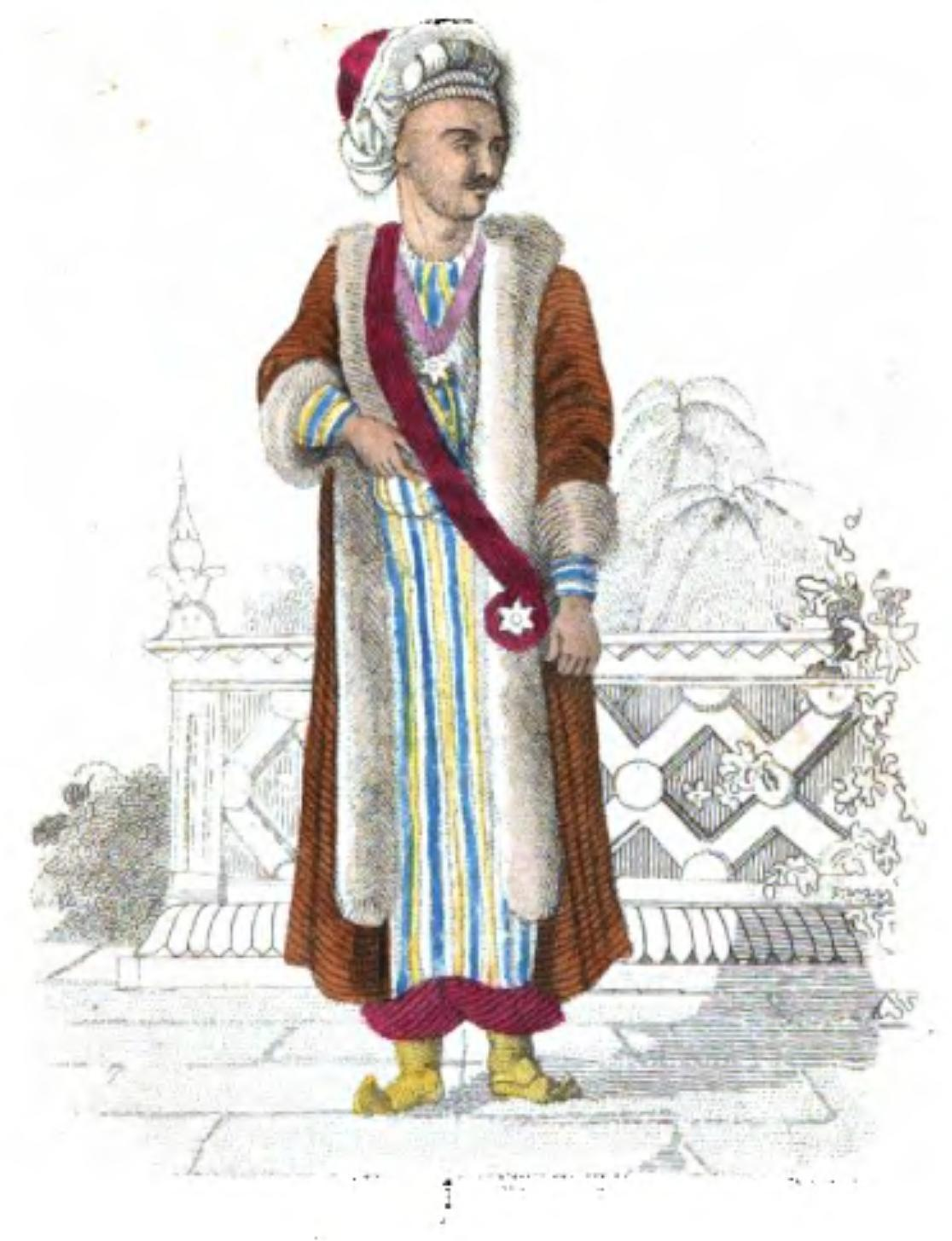
Ambassador illustrated in Persia by Frederic Shoberl, identified as Daoud Zadour, c. 1828

The foreign government to which an ambassador is assigned must first approve the person. In some cases, the foreign government might reverse its approval by declaring the diplomat a persona non grata, i.e. an unacceptable person. This kind of declaration usually results in recalling the ambassador to their home nation. In accordance with the Congress of Vienna of 1815 and the 1961 Vienna Convention on Diplomatic Relations, the ambassador and embassy staff are granted diplomatic immunity and personal safety while living abroad.

=== Protection of citizens ===
Due to the advent of modern technologies, today's world is a much smaller place in relative terms. With this in mind, it is considered important that the nations of the world have at least a small staff living in foreign capitals in order to aid travelers and visitors from their home nation. As an officer of the foreign service, an ambassador is expected to protect the citizens of their home country in the host country.

=== Support for prosperity ===
Another result of the increase in foreign travel is the growth of trade between nations. For most countries, the national economy is now part of the global economy. This means increased opportunities to sell and trade with other nations. When two nations are conducting a trade, it is usually advantageous to both parties to have an ambassador and perhaps a small staff living in the other land, where they act as an intermediary between cooperative businesses.

=== Work for peace ===
One of the cornerstones of foreign diplomatic missions is to work for peace. This task can grow into a fight against international terrorism, the drug trade, international bribery, and human trafficking. Ambassadors help stop these acts, helping people across the globe. These activities are important and sensitive and are usually carried out in coordination with the Defense Ministry of the state and the head of the nation.

== Rise of modern diplomacy ==
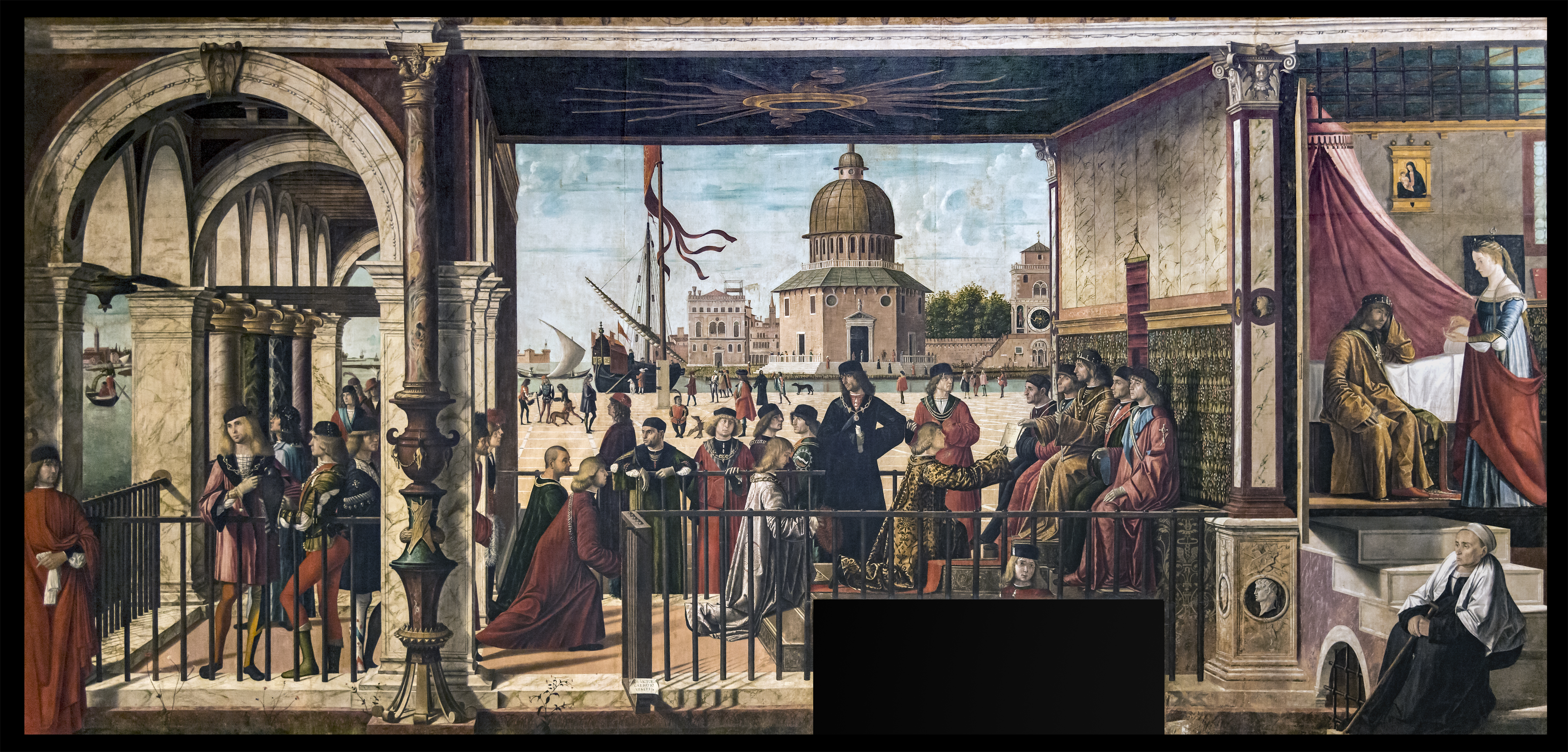
Arrival of the English Ambassadors by Vittore Carpaccio, painted between 1495 and 1500—though ostensibly part of a series of paintings on the life of Saint Ursula, this actually depicts the developing diplomatic practices of the Republic of Venice in the painter's own time.

Before the rise of modern diplomatic relations, sovereign states – which traded with each other, went to war and made peace – had the need for diplomatic relations, which took various forms. For example, the city states of Classical Greece used the system of proxeny, whereby a proxenos – who was a citizen of the host city rather than of the city whose interests he promoted – fulfilled some of the functions given to modern ambassadors and consuls.

The rise of the modern diplomatic system was a product of the Italian Renaissance (from around AD 1300). The use of ambassadors became a political strategy in Italy during the 15th century. The political changes in Italy altered the role of ambassadors in diplomatic affairs. Because many of the states in Italy were small, they were particularly vulnerable to larger states. The ambassador system was used to disperse information and to protect the more vulnerable states.

This practice then spread to Europe during the Italian Wars. The use and creation of ambassadors during the 15th century in Italy has had long-term effects on Europe and, in turn, the world's diplomatic and political progression. Europe still uses the same terms of ambassador rights as they had established in the 16th century, concerning the rights of the ambassadors in host countries as well as the proper diplomatic procedures. An ambassador was used as a representative of the state in which they are from to negotiate and disseminate information in order to keep peace and establish relationships with other states. This attempt was employed in the effort to maintain peaceful relations with nations and make alliances during difficult times.

The use of ambassadors today is widespread. States and non-state actors use diplomatic representatives to deal with any problems that occur within the international system. Ambassadors now normally live overseas or within the country to which it is assigned for long periods of time so that they are acquainted with the culture and local people. This way they are more politically effective and trusted, enabling them to accomplish goals that their host country desires.

== Ambassador extraordinary and plenipotentiary ==
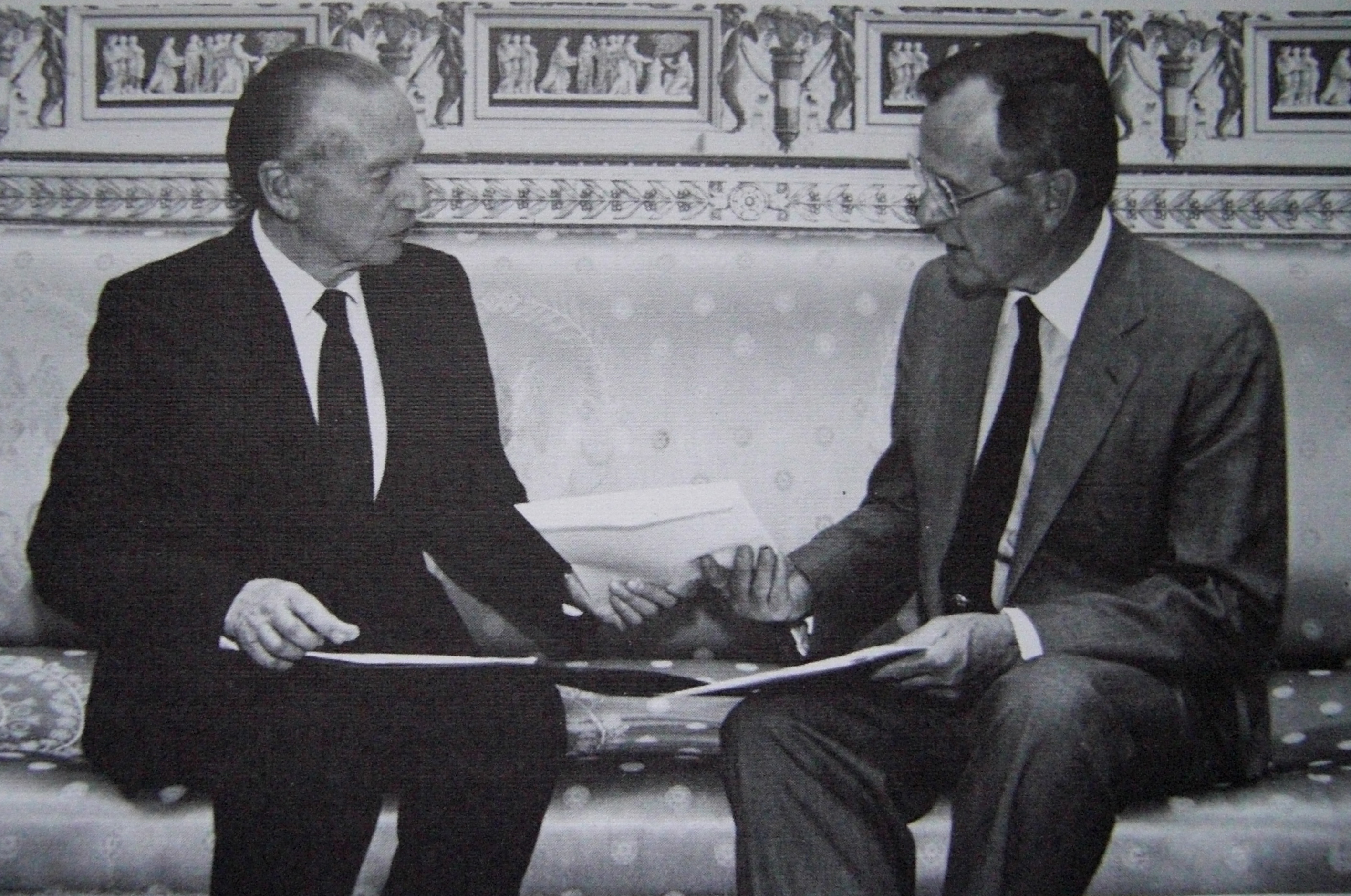
Before an ambassador takes office, their credentials must be accepted, such as when South African Ambassador Harry Schwarz handed his credentials to U.S. President George H. W. Bush in 1991.

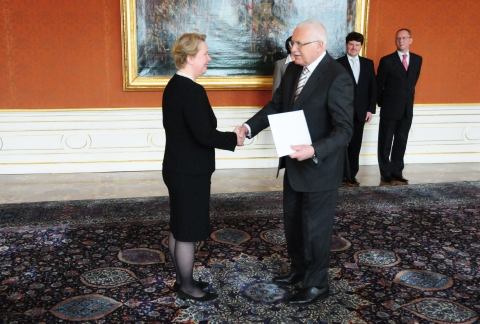
Maria-Pia Kothbauer, Princess of Liechtenstein and ambassador extraordinary and plenipotentiary to the Czech Republic, presenting her credentials to Václav Klaus.

The Congress of Vienna of 1815 formalized the system of diplomatic rank under international law, distinguishing between three hierarchical descending categories of diplomatic representatives: full ambassadors (including legates or nuntii), accredited to heads of state; envoys or ministers, who were also accredited to heads of state; and finally chargés d’affaires, who were accredited to the minister of foreign affairs.

The Vienna Convention on Diplomatic Relations of 1961, which took effect in 1964 and is still in force, modified the system. According to it, ambassadors are diplomats of the highest rank, formally representing their head of state, with plenipotentiary powers (i.e. full authority to represent the government). In modern usage, most ambassadors on foreign postings as head of mission carry the full title of Ambassador Extraordinary and Plenipotentiary. The distinction between extraordinary and ordinary ambassadors was common when not all ambassadors resided in the country to which they were assigned, often serving only for a specific purpose or mission.

The ambassador extraordinary and plenipotentiary being historically regarded as the personal representative of the sovereign, the custom of dispatching ambassadors to the head of state rather than the government has persisted. For example, ambassadors to and from the United Kingdom are accredited to or from the Royal Court of St James's. Ambassadors hold the highest diplomatic rank and have precedence over chargés d'affaires, who are accredited by the foreign minister. Ambassadors also outranked envoys until the 1960s, when the last legations were upgraded to embassies.

Because members of the Commonwealth of Nations have or had a common head of state, they do not exchange ambassadors, but instead have High Commissioners, who represent the government, rather than the head of state. The diplomat representing the Holy See is titled a nuncio. In diplomatic usage, both the high commissioner and nuncio are considered equivalent in rank and role to an ambassador; high commissioners, like ambassadors, carry the full title of "High Commissioner Extraordinary and Plenipotentiary", but nuncios do not. Resident Coordinators within the United Nations system are accredited to the Head of State and have the same rank as ambassador.

Ambassadors carry formal letters of credence from their head of state, addressed to the host country's head of state. Because many Commonwealth countries have the same head of state, the accreditation of a High Commissioner is in the form of a simple and often informal letter of introduction from one head of government (Prime Minister) to that of another. The difference in accreditation is also reflected in the formal titles of envoys to foreign and Commonwealth states: e.g., British High Commissioners are formally titled "The High Commissioner for His Majesty's Government in the United Kingdom", whereas British Ambassadors to foreign countries are known as "His Britannic Majesty's Ambassador".

== Ambassador-at-large ==
An ambassador-at-large is a diplomat of the highest rank or a minister who is accredited to represent their country. But unlike the ambassador-in-residence, who is usually limited to a country or embassy, the ambassador-at-large can be appointed to operate in several usually neighbouring countries, a region or sometimes a seat of international organizations such as the United Nations or European Union. In some cases, an ambassador-at-large may even be specifically assigned a role to advise and assist the state or government in particular issues.

Historically, presidents or prime ministers have commissioned special diplomatic envoys for specific assignments, primarily overseas but sometimes also within the country as ambassadors-at-large.

== Title ==
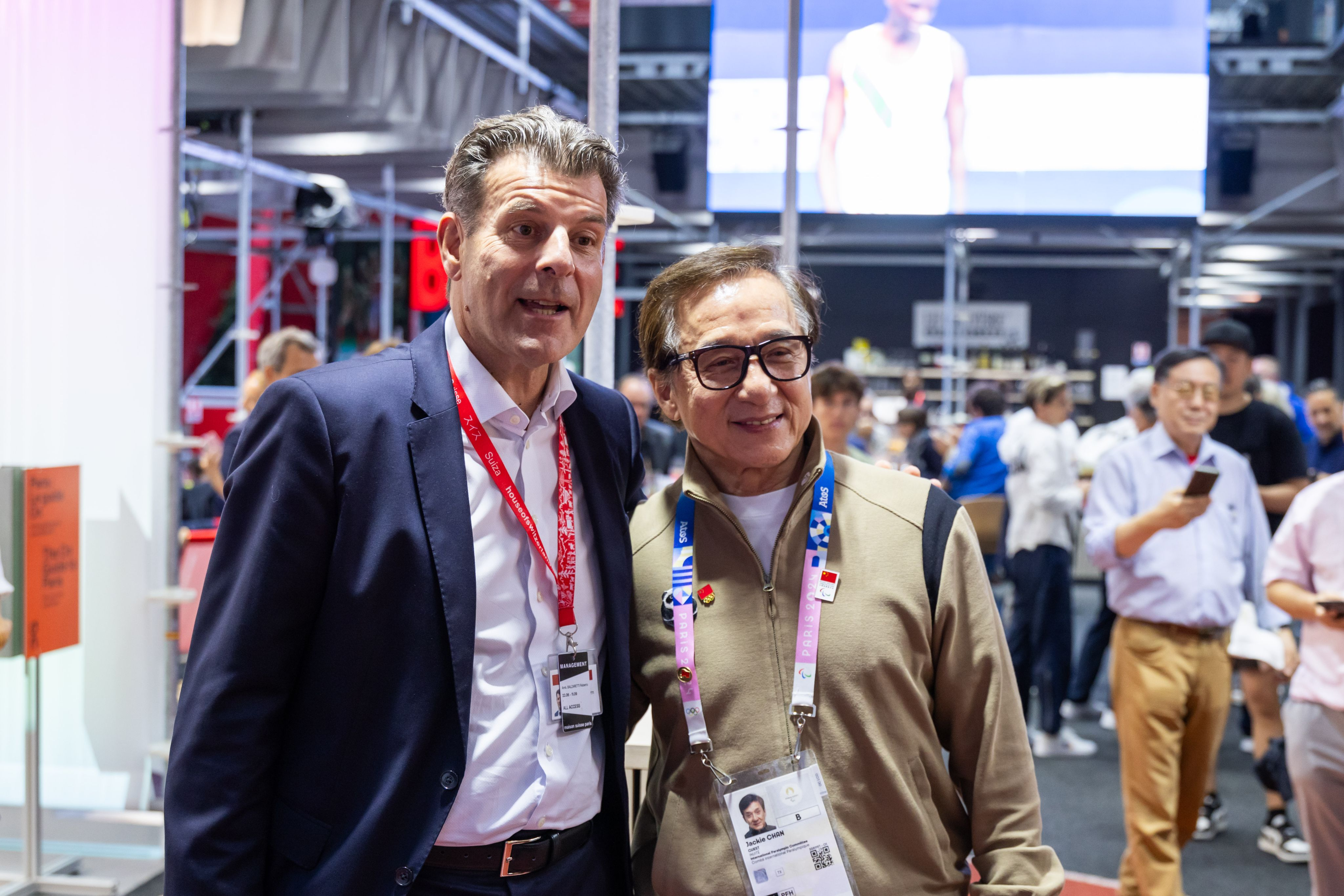
2024 Summer Olympics and 2024 Summer Paralympics in Paris: Ambassador Roberto Balzaretti welcomes Jackie Chan on 30 August at the House of Switzerland in the garden of the Hôtel de Besenval, the Embassy of the Swiss Confederation in Paris.

While the title generally reflects the ambassador's position as head of a diplomatic mission, in some countries the term may also represent a rank held by career diplomats, as a matter of internal promotion, regardless of the posting, and in many national careers it is quite common for them to be appointed to other functions, especially within the ministry/ministries in charge of foreign affairs, in some countries in systematic alternation with actual postings. The formal form of address for an ambassador is generally the form that would be used to address a head of state: "(Your/His/Her) Excellency" followed by name or the country represented. In many countries, less formal variations are frequently used, such as "Ambassador" followed by name, or the name followed by "Ambassador of...". In the United States, "Mister/Madam Ambassador" may be used.

In some countries, a former ambassador may continue to be styled and addressed as ambassador throughout their life (in the United States, "Mr. Ambassador" or "Madam Ambassador" may be heard). In other countries, ambassador is a title that accrues to its holder only with respect to a specific position, and may not be used after leaving or beyond the position. Some countries do not use the term while an ambassador is in the home country, as the officeholder is not an ambassador there; for example, a Canadian ambassador while in Canada is not generally addressed as ambassador, although they may be referred to as "Canadian ambassador to ..."; that is, with reference to a specific job function; the person is addressed or styled as ambassador only while holding such office.

== Non-diplomatic ambassadorships ==
In a less formal sense, the phrase is used for high-profile non-diplomatic representatives of various entities (rarely states), mainly cultural and charitable organizations, often as willing figureheads to attract media attention; for example, film and pop stars make appeals to the public at large for United Nations activities, sometimes during press-swarmed visits in the foreign country. Public figures are sometimes nominated or invited to endorse events designated as ambassadors, brand ambassadors, and goodwill ambassadors.

Many times, international agencies like United Nations also appoint ambassadors to achieve the objectives of a particular mission, like the appointment of goodwill ambassador Bollywood film actress Priyanka Chopra for UNICEF. Japan adopted the cartoon character Hello Kitty as their official goodwill and tourism ambassador to China and Hong Kong in 2008. Businesses may appoint brand ambassadors, typically a celebrity or someone of a well-known presence, who may be paid considerably. In French-speaking regions such as metropolitan France, Guadeloupe, Réunion, Quebec, or Wallonia, the title of ambassadeur personne is used.

In sports, ambassadors are prominent athletes who officially or unofficially represent their home country's culture, values, or sporting prowess on the international stage.

Further, in the United States, senior career officers of the U.S. Foreign Service may be appointed by the President, by and with the advice and consent of the Senate, to the rank of Career Ambassador as professional achievement. Holders of this rank may not necessarily possess diplomatic authority or accreditation to any state, though nearly all have previously served as an Ambassador Extraordinary and Plenipotentiary during their careers. By custom, they hold the rank for life (including retirement), are addressed with the title Ambassador and may use U.S. Diplomatic Passports for all travel. Prominent career ambassadors include Lawrence Eagleburger, William Joseph Burns and Ryan Crocker.

== See also ==
- Chargé d'affaires
- Consul (representative)
- Lists of ambassadors
- Diplomacy
- Diplomatic rank
- Goodwill ambassador

== Bibliography ==
- Rana, Kishan (2003). The 21st Century Ambassador: people who are very important. Oxford University Press. Archived from the original on 7 May 2020.
