= Papa Diop (diplomat) =

Senegalese diplomat

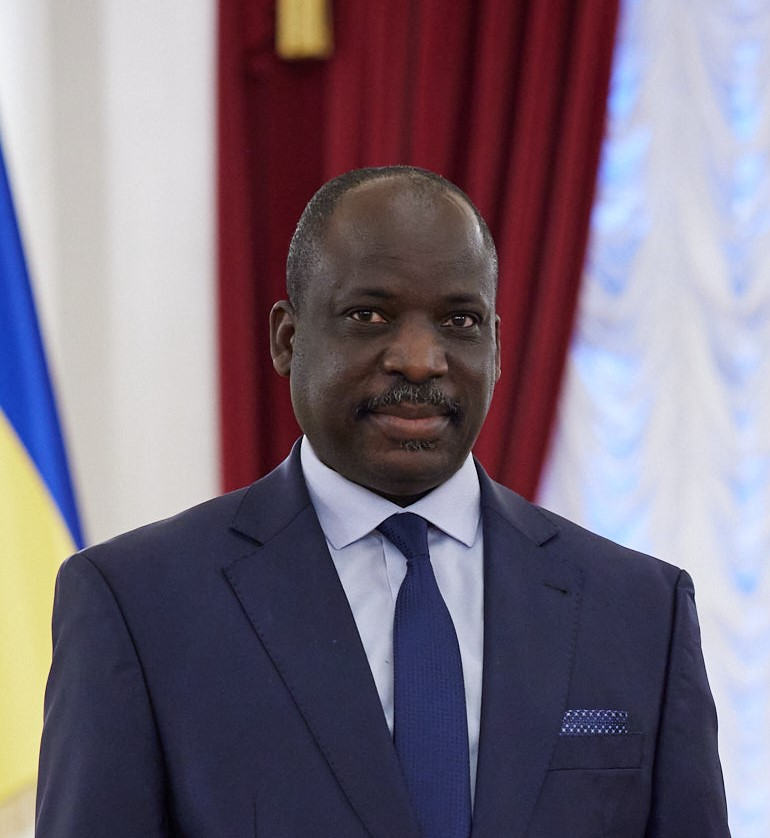
- Diop in 2021

Ambassador of Senegal to Poland
- Incumbent
- Assumed office January 10, 2020

Ambassador of Senegal to Ukraine
- Incumbent
- Assumed office December 9, 2021

Ambassador of Senegal to the Czech Republic
- Incumbent
- Assumed office September 1, 2021

Personal details
- Born: Senegal

Papa Diop is a Senegalese diplomat serving as the ambassador of Senegal to Poland, Ukraine, and the Czech Republic.

== Biography ==
Diop began his diplomatic career in 2000 as an intern at the Permanent Mission of Senegal to the United Nations in Geneva.

On January 10, 2020, he presented his credentials to President of Poland Andrzej Duda. That same year, he was appointed Ambassador Extraordinary and Plenipotentiary of Senegal to Poland. Since September 1, 2021, Diop has been the Ambassador Extraordinary and Plenipotentiary of Senegal to the Czech Republic on a part-time basis. That same day, he received the same title to become the Senegalese ambassador to Ukraine. In December 2021, he presented his credentials to Ukrainian president Volodymyr Zelenskyy. On December 10, 2021, Diop attended the opening of the honorary consulate of Senegal in Ternopil.

In 2022, Diop attended a conference about Ukrainian-African collaboration in the wake of the Russian invasion of Ukraine hosted by Western Ukrainian National University.
