= Persenbeug Castle =

Castle in Lower Austria, Austria

Coordinates: 48°11′24″N 15°4′30″E

Schloss Persenbeug
- Persenbeug-Gottsdorf, Lower Austria, Austria
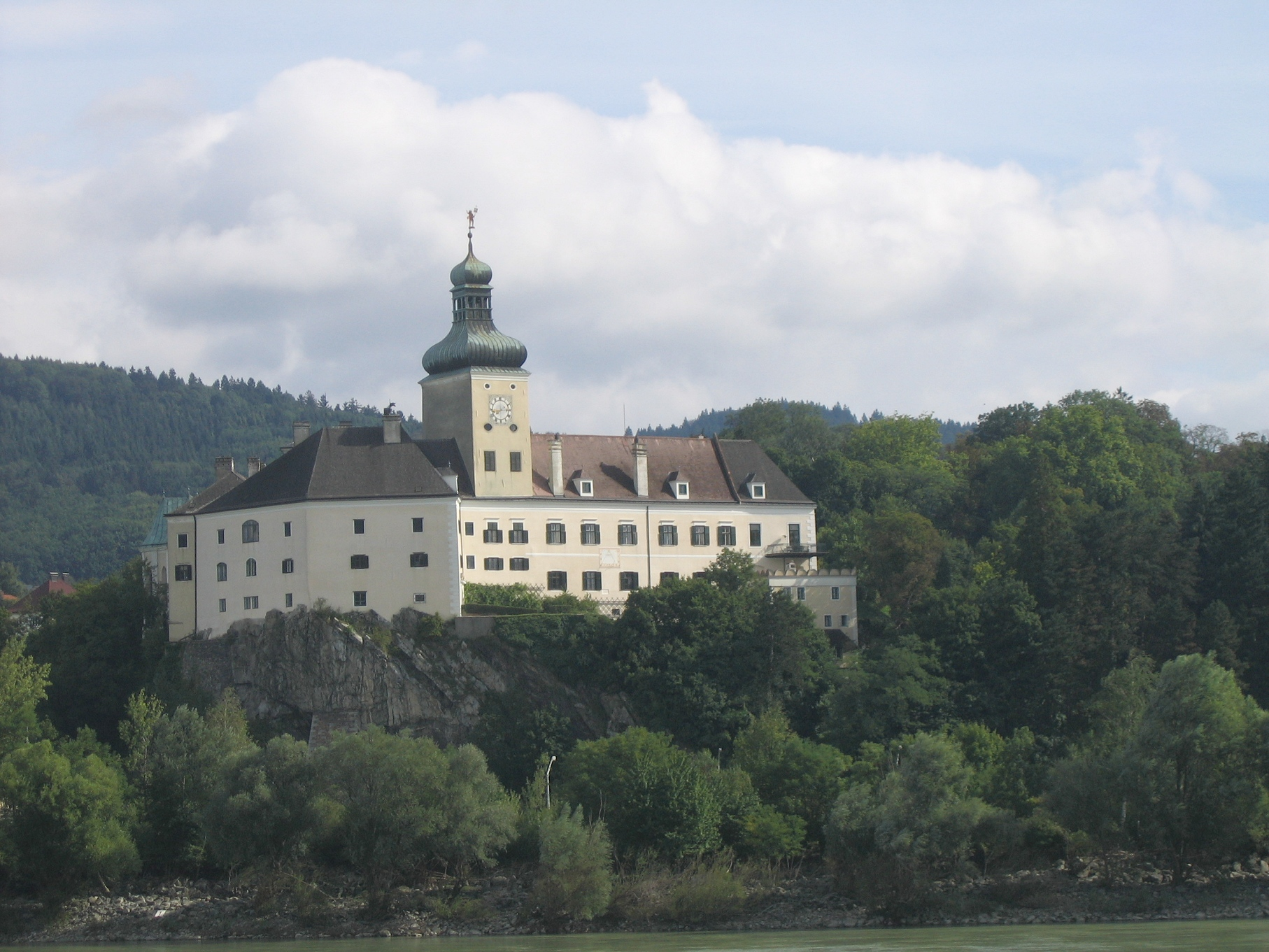

Site information
- Type: Castle

Persenbeug Castle (Schloss Persenbeug) is a castle in Lower Austria, Austria. Persenbeug Castle is 239 metres (784 ft) above sea level.

== See also ==
- List of castles in Austria
