= Persenbeug-Gottsdorf =

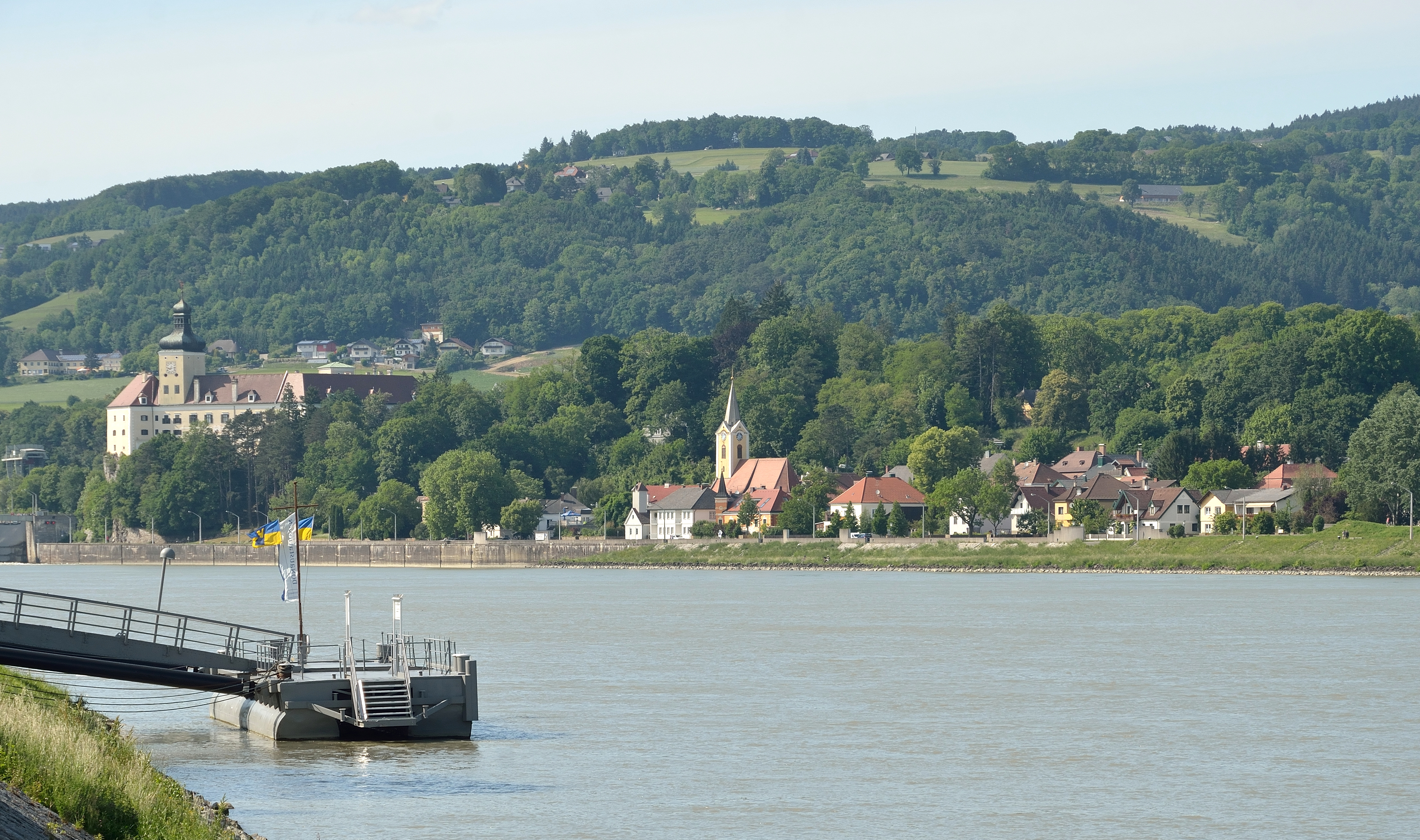

- Location within Austria
- Coordinates: 48°11′N 15°4′E
- Country: Austria
- State: Lower Austria
- District: Melk

Government
  - Mayor: Manfred Mitmasser

Area
  - Total: 8.32 km^{2} (3.21 sq mi)
- Elevation: 230 m (750 ft)

Population (2018-01-01)
  - Total: 2,201
  - Density: 265/km^{2} (685/sq mi)
- Time zone: UTC+1 (CET)
  - Summer (DST): UTC+2 (CEST)
- Postal code: 3680
- Area code: 07412

Persenbeug-Gottsdorf is a town in the district of Melk in the Austrian state of Lower Austria on the left bank of the river Danube.

== Geography ==
The municipality has the following subdivisions:

- Gottsdorf
- Hagsdorf
- Metzling
- Persenbeug

== Places of interest ==
The Castle of Persenbeug, one of few private properties of the Habsburgian descendants.

The Persenbeug-Ybbs power station, being the first Austrian Danube spillway dam, built in 1954–1959. Found on river km 2060 and serving also as a road bridge, it has now 7 turbines and there are guided tours (every afternoon, in German only). The adjacent lock with two chambers is part of the international Danube waterway.

The Danube cycle path, the tourist Eisenwurzenweg and Jakobsweg are also crossing the Danube via the dam.

== Notable people ==
- Charles I of Austria (1887 – 1922), Emperor of Austria & King of Hungary, born in Persenbeug Castle
