= Franz, 6th Prince of Salm-Reifferscheidt-Krautheim =

Franz Josef

Prince of Salm-Reifferscheidt-Krautheim
- Reign: 1924–1958
- Predecessor: Alfred
- Successor: None
- Born: 7 April 1899; Vienna, Austria-Hungary
- Died: 13 June 1958 (aged 59); Bonn, North Rhine-Westphalia Germany
- Spouse: Princess Cecilie of Salm-Salm (m. 1930; died 1958)
Names
- Franz Josef Alfred Leopold Hermann Maria zu Salm-Reifferscheidt-Krautheim und Dyck
- Father: Alfred, 5th Prince of Salm-Reifferscheidt-Krautheim
- Mother: Countess Marie-Dorothea von Bellegarde

Franz Josef Alfred Leopold Hermann Maria, Prince of Salm-Reifferscheidt-Krautheim and Dyck (7 April 1899 – 13 June 1958) was a German nobleman and entrepreneur.

== Early life ==
Franz was born in Vienna in the Austro-Hungarian Empire on 7 April 1899. He was the son of Alfred, 5th Prince of Salm-Reifferscheidt-Krautheim and Countess Marie-Dorothea von Bellegarde. His siblings included Princess Maria (who died young); Princess Christianne (who married Franz Leopold von Hartig); Prince Alfred (who died young); and Princess Paula.

His paternal grandparents were Leopold, 4th Prince of Salm-Reifferscheidt-Krautheim (second son of Konstantin, 2nd Prince of Salm-Reifferscheidt-Krautheim) and, his first wife, Baroness Anna Maria von Thurn und Valsássina-Como-Vercelli. (Note: After his grandmother's death in 1864, his grandfather married Countess Marie Christine Caroline Rosa Gabriele Adolphine von Spiegel zum Desenberg.) His maternal grandparents were Count Franz Alexander Ernst Noyel von Bellegarde and Countess Rudolphine Karoline Kinsky von Wchinitz und Tettau.

== Career ==
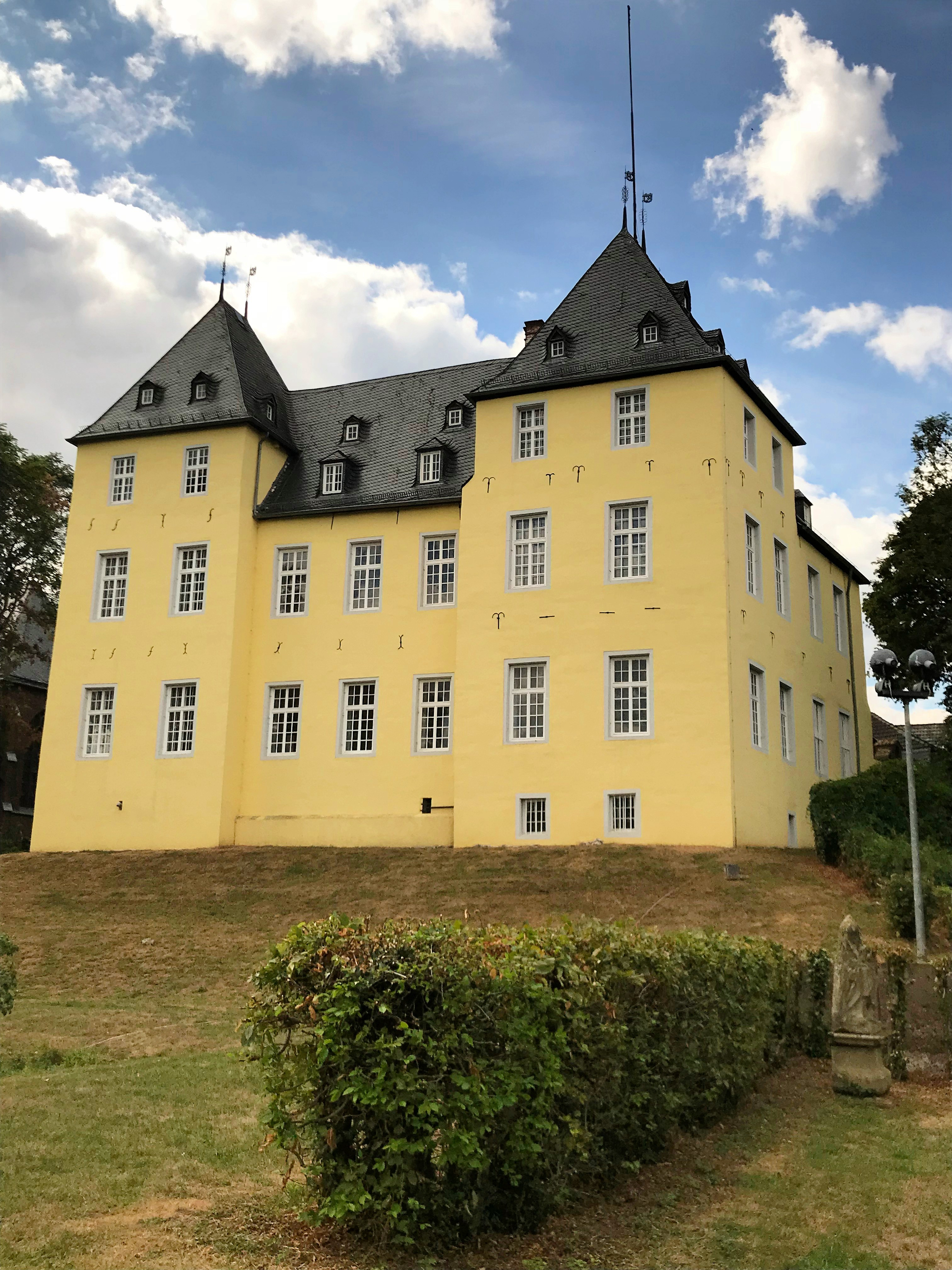
Alfter Castle, 2018

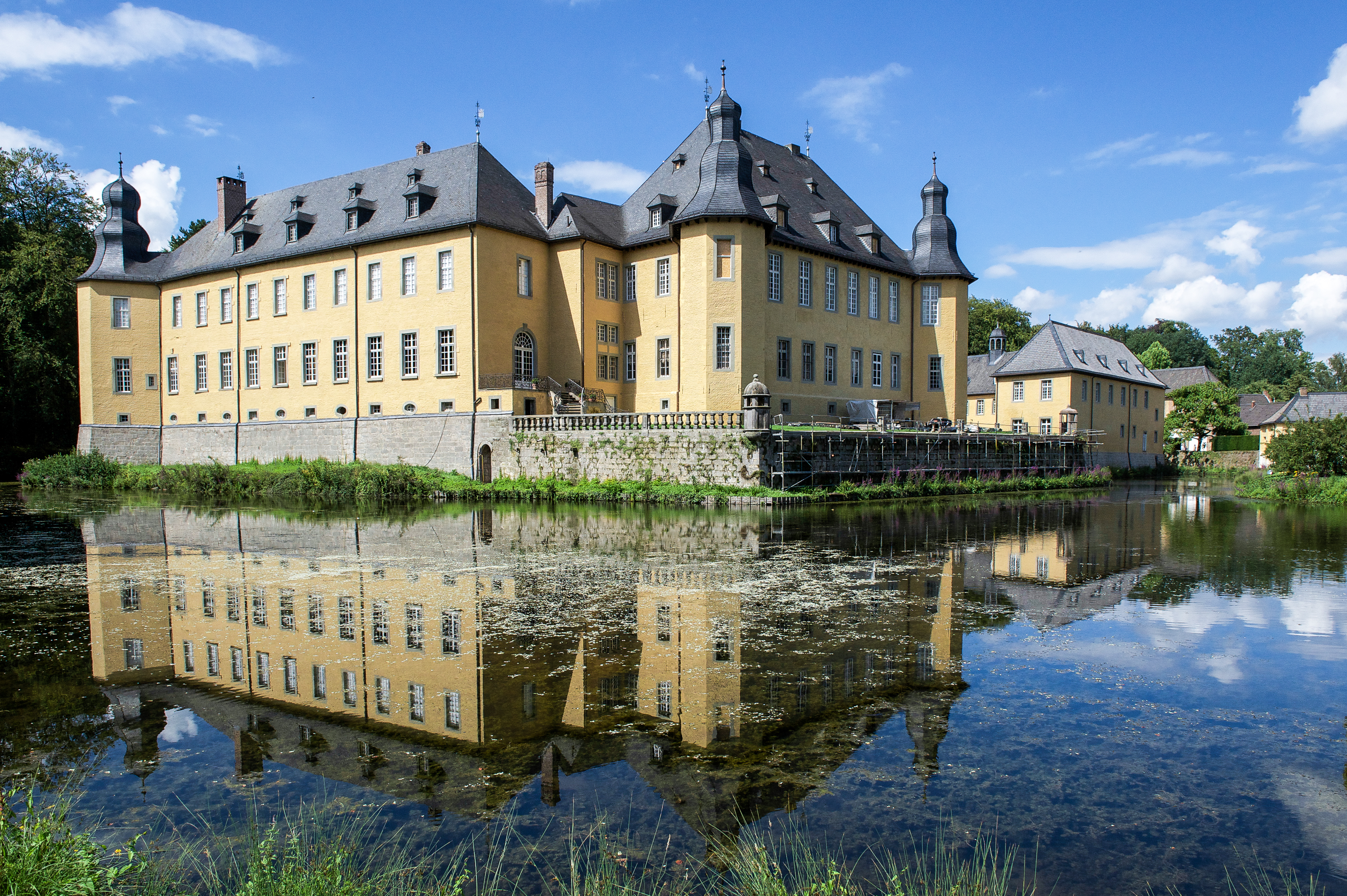
Dyck Castle, 2011

After his father was killed by a train at the Morken railroad crossing in 1924, he became the titular 6th Prince of Salm-Reifferscheidt-Krautheim and Dyck, and took over the majorat and family estates on the Rhine and in Baden.

Prince Franz was the owner of the Salm-Dyck-Reifferscheidt mineral springs ("Roisdorfer Mineralquelle") and took over the company in 1948 under the name "Roisdorfer Brunnen Fürst Salm & Co." He was Grand Master of the "Archconfraternities of Saint Sebastian" in the German Riflemen's Association.

=== Order of the Holy Sepulchre ===
On 29 May 1924 in Rome, Prince Franz was invested into the Equestrian Order of the Holy Sepulchre. On 1 October 1932, His Beatitude, the Patriarch of Jerusalem Luigi Barlassina, appointed Franz Joseph, Prince and Count of Salm-Reifferscheid-Krautheim and Dyck, then Vice President of the German Association of the Holy Land, as Rector and Administrator of the Equestrian Order of the Holy Sepulchre of Jerusalem, as the first Governor of a separate German Lieutenancy. His successor as German Lieutenant after his death in 1958 was Baron Friedrich August von der Heydte.

== Personal life ==
On 27 May 1930, Prince Franz was married to Princess Cäcilie of Salm-Salm (1911–1991), a daughter of Emanuel, Hereditary Prince of Salm-Salm, (Note: Emanuel, Hereditary Prince of Salm-Salm, was the son of Alfred, 7th Prince of Salm-Salm and Countess Rosa of Lützow.) and Archduchess Maria Christina of Austria. (Note: Archduchess Maria Christina of Austria (1879–1962) was the eldest child and daughter of Archduke Friedrich, Duke of Teschen and his wife Princess Isabella of Croÿ.) They lived at Alfter Castle near Bonn, and after World War II, they lived at Dyck Castle in Jüchen. Together, they were the parents of eight children, six of whom survived to adulthood, including:

- Princess and Altgräfin Marie Christine Erwine Isabelle Innocentia Thaddäa of Salm-Reifferscheidt-Krautheim and Dyck (1932–2010), who married Count Peter von Wolff-Metternich zur Gracht in 1955.
- Princess Marie Anne Friederike Christine Leopoldine Emmanuela Helena of Salm-Reifferscheidt-Krautheim and Dyck (b. 1933), who married Hon. Alexander Campbell Geddes, second son of Auckland Geddes, 1st Baron Geddes and American heiress Isabella Gamble Ross, in 1964. After his death in 1971, she married Otto von Simson, a son of Ernst von Simson, in 1978.
- Princess Rosemary Ferdinande Dorothea Mathea Michaela Josepha Thaddäa of Salm-Reifferscheidt-Krautheim and Dyck (1937–2004), who married Count Johannes von Hüyn in 1959.
- Princess Isabella Marie Franziska Gabrielle Pia of Salm-Reifferscheidt-Krautheim and Dyck (b. 1939), who married Price Franz Albrecht of Hohenlohe-Schillingsfürst-Metternich-Sándor, Duke of Ratibor, Prince of Corvey, in 1962.
- Princess Gabrielle Louisanne Huberta Theodora Maria Immaculata of Salm-Reifferscheidt-Krautheim and Dyck (1941–1985), who married Count Ernst Friedrich von Goëss, in 1961.
- Princess Cecilie Christine Caroline Maria Immaculata Michaela Thaddäa of Salm-Reifferscheidt-Krautheim and Dyck (b. 1943)
- Princess Georgina "Gina" of Salm-Reifferscheidt-Krautheim and Dyck (1947–1950), who died young.

Prince Franz died on 13 June 1958 in Bonn in North Rhine-Westphalia. Upon his death, the male line of the Prince of Salm-Reifferscheidt-Dyck of the Salm-Reifferscheidt family became extinct. His widow, Princess Cäcilie, died at Dyck Castle on 11 March 1991.
