= Alfred, 5th Prince of Salm-Reifferscheidt-Krautheim =

Alfred
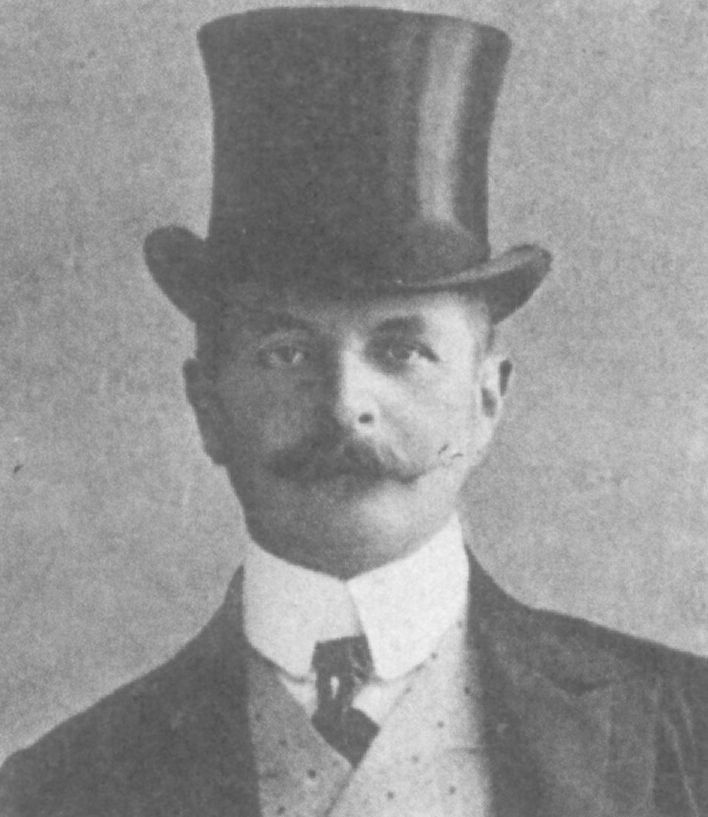

Prince of Salm-Reifferscheidt-Krautheim
- Reign: 1893–1924
- Predecessor: Leopold
- Successor: Franz Josef
- Born: 23 June 1863; Celje, Duchy of Styria
- Died: 6 July 1924 (aged 61); Morken-Harff, North Rhine-Westphalia, Germany
- Spouse: Countess Marie-Dorothea von Bellegarde (m. 1898; died 1924)
- Alfred Georg Konstantin Leopold Prosper Joseph Maria zu Salm-Reifferscheidt-Krautheim-Dyck
- Father: Leopold, 4th Prince of Salm-Reifferscheidt-Krautheim
- Mother: Baroness Anna Maria von Thurn und Valsássina-Como-Vercelli

Alfred Georg Konstantin Leopold Prosper Joseph Maria, Prince of Salm-Reifferscheidt-Krautheim and Dyck (23 June 1863 – 6 July 1924) was a nobleman and member of the German Reichstag.

== Early life ==
Alfred was born in Celje in the Duchy of Styria on 23 June 1863. He was the son of Leopold, 4th Prince of Salm-Reifferscheidt-Krautheim (1833–1893) and, his first wife, Baroness Anna Maria von Thurn und Valsássina-Como-Vercelli (1837–1864). After his mother's death in 1864, his father married Countess Marie Christine Caroline Rosa Gabriele Adolphine von Spiegel zum Desenberg.

His paternal grandparents were Konstantin, 2nd Prince of Salm-Reifferscheidt-Krautheim and Princess Charlotte of Hohenlohe-Jagstberg. His aunt, Princess Eleonore of Salm-Reifferscheidt-Krautheim, married Baron Stanislaus Bourguignon von Baumberg. His uncle, Prince Friedrich Karl of Salm-Reifferscheidt-Krautheim, was killed in the Battle of Náchod, the first major action of the Austro-Prussian War. His maternal grandparents were Georg von Thurn und Valsássina-Como-Vercelli and Countess Emilie Chorinsky.

Alfred attended college at Kalksburg near Vienna, studied law, including two semesters at the Kaiser-Wilhelm-Universität in Strasbourg, France, and passed the state law examinations at the University of Graz.

== Career ==
In 1888, his father inherited Dyck Castle in Jüchen from Prince Alfred of Salm-Reifferscheidt-Dyck. In 1893, after his father's death, he took over the majorat and family estates on the Rhine and in Baden. He was a member of the District Council and District Committee in the Grevenbroich district, vice president of The German Association of the Holy Land, and a hereditary member of the Prussian House of Lords.

He was promoted to Major (27 January 1912) à la suite of the army, awarded the Order of the Red Eagle, 1st Class, the Order of the Crown, 1st Class, the Order of the Zähringer Lion, 1st Class, a Knight of the Sovereign Order of Malta, Commander of the Order of St. George and the Grand Cross of the Order of the Holy Sepulchre.

From 1912 to 1918, he was a member of the German Reichstag for the Aachen constituency (Düren, Jülich) and the German Centre Party. Between 1907 and 1912, he was a member of the Provincial Parliament (Provinziallandtag in German) of the Rhine Province.

== Personal life ==
On 28 April 1898 in Vienna, Alfred was married to Countess Marie-Dorothea von Bellegarde (1873–1945), a daughter of Count Franz Alexander Ernst Noyel von Bellegarde and Countess Rudolphine Karoline Kinsky von Wchinitz und Tettau. They had five children:

- Franz Josef, 6th Prince of Salm-Reifferscheidt-Krautheim (1899–1958), who married Princess Cäcilie of Salm-Salm, a daughter of Emanuel, Hereditary Prince of Salm-Salm, (Note: Emanuel, Hereditary Prince of Salm-Salm, was the son of Alfred, 7th Prince of Salm-Salm and Countess Rosa of Lützow.) and Archduchess Maria Christina of Austria, in 1930. (Note: Archduchess Maria Christina of Austria (1879–1962) was the eldest child and daughter of Archduke Friedrich, Duke of Teschen and his wife Princess Isabella of Croÿ.)
- Princess Maria Rudolfine Anna Wilhelmine Eusebia Josepha (1900–1915), who died young.
- Princess Christianne (1901–1984), who married Franz Leopold von Hartig, a son of Franz Gabriel von Hartig and Countess Johanna von Ledebur-Wicheln.
- Prince Alfred Georg Rudolf Joseph Maria (1903–1920), who died unmarried.
- Princess Paula Wilhelmine Raphaele Maria Josepha (1906–1968).

On 6 July 1924, the Prince, accompanied by his chauffeur, housekeeper, and his daughters, Christianne and Paula, were driving to Harff Castle when their car was struck by a train at the Morken railroad crossing and dragged to the Harff train station. The Prince and his chauffeur were killed instantly, the housekeeper died two days later at Düren Hospital, and Christianne was seriously injured. His widow died on 1 February 1945 at Überlingen am Bodensee.
