= Salm-Reifferscheid-Dyck =

County of the Holy Roman Empire

County of Salm-Reifferscheid-Dyck Grafschaft Salm-Reifferscheid-Dyck
- 1639–1811
- Coat of arms
- Status: State of the Holy Roman Empire, then Client of the First French Empire and State of the Confederation of the Rhine
- Capital: Dyck
- Government: Principality
- Historical era: Napoleonic Wars
  - Partitioned from Salm-Reifferscheid: 1639 1639
  - Joined the Rhine confederation: 1806
  - Annexed by France: 1811
  - Mediatised to Prussia: 1813
Preceded by	Succeeded by
Salm-Reifferscheid	Lippe (department)

Salm-Reifferscheid-Dyck was a small imperial county of the Holy Roman Empire. Its territory was the area around Dyck (south-east of Mönchengladbach) in present North Rhine-Westphalia, Germany.

== History ==
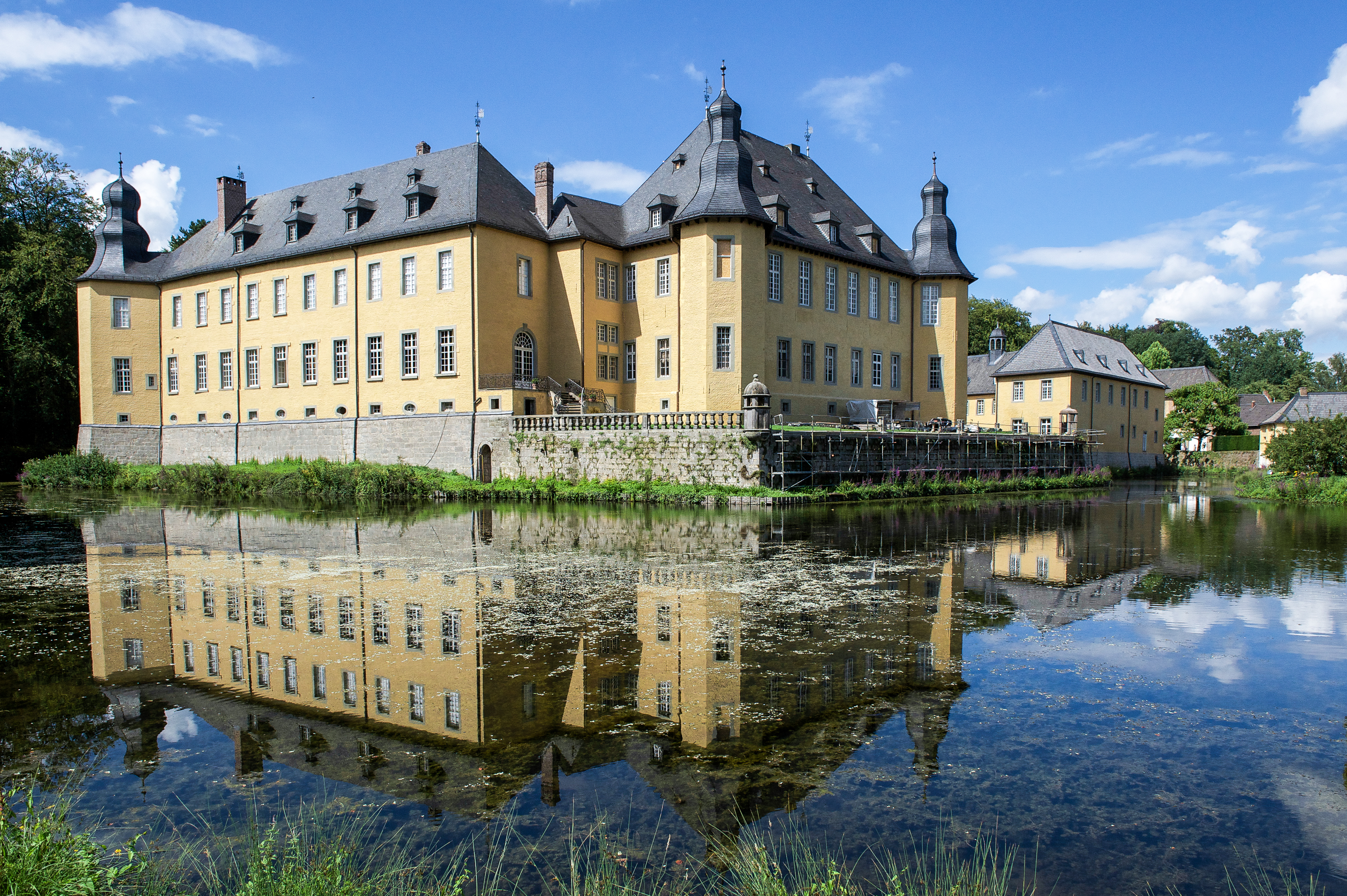
Schloss Dyck, residence of the Salm-Reifferscheid-Dyck branch in 2011

Salm-Reifferscheid-Dyck was a partition of Salm-Reifferscheid, divided between two grandsons of the ruling family in 1639.

The Salm-Reifferscheids ruled the Dyck Land Absolutely until the French invasion in 1795. It was annexed in 1811 by the First French Empire in the French Revolutionary Wars. The county was mediatised to the Kingdom of Prussia in 1813. Three years later in 1816, as compensation for their loss, the Head of the family was raised to the title of Fürst in Prussia, but without the material rights of the lords of the manor (since, according to Prussian legal theory, they were not part of the Empire), such as tax exemptions, official police, free use of hunting, etc. This meant that they lost all sovereign rights. Their prior rights as lords of the manor (before 1795) included, among other things, the high court, civil jurisdiction, customs duties, tolls, and excise taxes. Thus, from 1816 onward, the Princes of Salm-Reiferscheid, unlike other lords of the manor (who lost sovereignty over the land), were legally equal to all their former subjects, simple Prussian subjects.

When this branch of the Salm family died out in 1888, the style was assumed by their closest agnatic cousins, Princes of Salm-Reifferscheid-Krautheim. Upon the death of Franz Josef, Prince and Count of Salm-Reiferscheid in 1958, the male line of Salm-Reifferscheidt-Krautheim and Dyck became extinct.

The full princely style was Imperial Prince of Salm, Duke of Hoogstraten, Forest Count of Dhaun and Kyrburg, Rhine Count of Stein, Lord of Diemeringen and Anholt.

== Counts of Salm-Reifferscheidt-Dyck (1639–1806) ==
- Ernest Salentin, Count 1639–1684 (1621–1684), second son of Ernst Friedrich, Count of Salm-Reifferscheidt
  - Francis Ernest, Count 1684–1727 (1659–1727)
    - Augustus Eugene Bernard, Count 1727–1767 (1706–1767)
    - Johann Franz Wilhelm, Count 1767–1775 (1714–1775)
      - Joseph Franz, Count 1775–1806 (mediatised from 1806), raised to the title of Fürst in 1816

== Princes of Salm-Reifferscheidt-Dyck (1816–1888) ==
  - Joseph Franz, 1st Prince 1816–1861 (1773–1861)
  - Prince Franz Joseph August of Salm-Reifferscheidt-Dyck (1775–1826)
    - Alfred Joseph Klemens, 2nd Prince 1861–1888 (1811–1888)
