= Konstantin, 2nd Prince of Salm-Reifferscheidt-Krautheim =

Konstantin
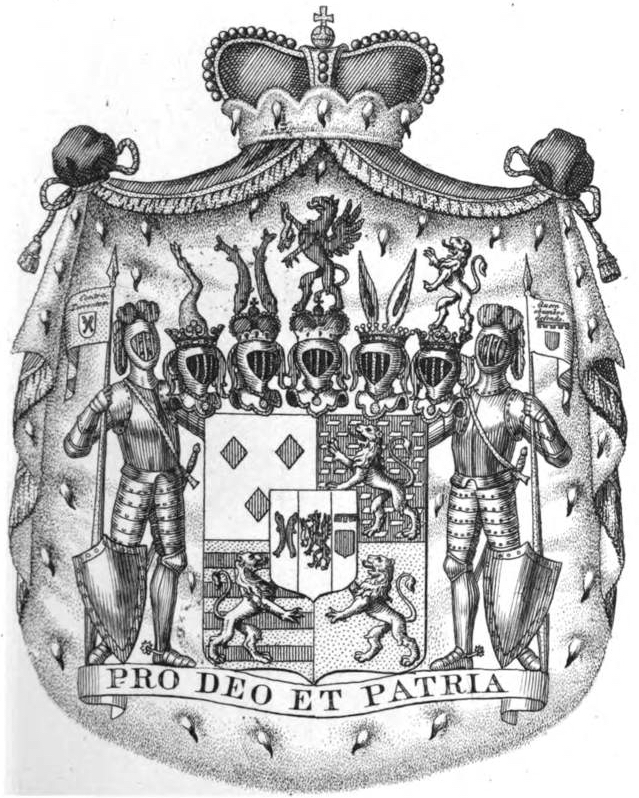

Prince of Salm-Reifferscheidt-Krautheim
- Reign: 1831–1856
- Predecessor: Franz Wilhelm
- Successor: Franz Karl
- Born: 27 April 1772; Löwenstein Castle, Kleinheubach, Principality of Löwenstein-Wertheim-Rochefort
- Died: 14 May 1831 (aged 59); Hersberg Castle, Grand Duchy of Baden
- Spouse: Princess Charlotte of Hohenlohe-Jagstberg (m. 1826; died 1856)
Names
- Konstantin Dominik Franz zu Salm-Reifferscheidt-Krautheim
- Father: Franz, 1st Prince of Salm-Reifferscheidt-Krautheim
- Mother: Princess Franziska of Hohenlohe-Bartenstein

Konstantin Dominik Franz zu Salm-Reifferscheidt-Krautheim (4 August 1798 – 10 February 1856) was an officer of the Grand Duchy of Baden and, from, 1831 Prince of Salm-Reifferscheidt-Krautheim. As such he was a member of the First Chamber of the Estates of Baden until the sale of the Estates in 1839.

== Early life ==
Konstantin was born on 4 August 1798 at Löwenstein Castle in Kleinheubach in the Principality of Löwenstein-Wertheim-Rochefort. He was the eldest surviving son of Franz, 1st Prince of Salm-Reifferscheidt-Krautheim and Princess Franziska of Hohenlohe-Bartenstein (1770–1812). Among his siblings were Princess Eleanore (wife of Victor Amadeus, Landgrave of Hesse-Rotenburg), (Note: His brother-in-law, Victor Amadeus, Landgrave of Hesse-Rotenburg, was the son of Charles Emmanuel, Landgrave of Hesse-Rotenburg and Princess Leopoldina of Liechtenstein (a daughter of Prince Franz Josef I), in 1831.) and Princess Leopoldine (wife of Hugo, 2nd Prince of Salm-Reifferscheidt-Raitz). (Note: His brother-in-law, Hugo, 2nd Prince of Salm-Reifferscheidt-Raitz, was the son of Count Hugo Franz of Salm-Reifferscheidt-Raitz.)

His paternal grandparents were Count Siegmund of Salm-Reifferscheidt-Bedburg, Imperial Chamberlain and Chief Court Master of the Electorate of Cologne, and Countess Eleonore of Waldburg-Zeil-Wurzach. His maternal grandparents were Louis Charles, 2nd Prince of Hohenlohe-Waldenburg-Bartenstein, and Countess Polyxena von Limburg-Stirum. Among his maternal uncles were Louis Aloysius, Prince of Hohenlohe-Waldenburg-Bartenstein and Charles Joseph, 1st Prince of Hohenlohe-Jagstberg.

== Career ==
Konstantin's father, a scion of the Lower Salm noble family of Salm-Reifferscheidt and ruling Count of Bedburg and Erp, was compensated in 1803 for the loss of his dominion on the left bank of the Rhine by the County of Krautheim in the Imperial Deputation Act. However, in 1806, as a result of the formation of the Confederation of the Rhine, this territory fell victim to mediatisation by the Grand Duchy of Baden and the Kingdom of Württemberg. His father found a new position as Chief Huntsman in the court of Ferdinand of Austria-Tuscany in the Grand Duchy of Würzburg. In 1806, Konstantin accompanied his father and aunt on a trip to the Grand Duchy of Berg to pay his respects to Grand Duke Joachim Murat. When Ferdinand ceded sovereignty over Würzburg to the Kingdom of Bavaria in 1814, his father entered the service of the Prussian King Frederick William III on 2 October 1815 as chief of the Rhenish Landwehr Regiment.

After his father became commander of the 1st Landwehr Regiment in Düsseldorf in 1818 and, on 26 March 1820, commander of the 2nd Combined Reserve Landwehr Regiment, and after the Düsseldorf Art Academy had made a new beginning in the training of young painters under Peter von Cornelius in 1819, Konstantin took instruction in painting from Cornelius. As his student, he appeared at an academy exhibition in 1823 with a composition of a "medieval castle".

In 1835, during a diplomatic mission to the Court of St. James's on behalf of Grand Duke Leopold, Konstantin presented Queen Adelaide with a hand-painted miniature of Hersberg Castle on ivory (executed in the style of Peter von Cornelius) and in return received a signed portrait cameo bearing the cipher of William IV, which remained in the family collection until its auction at Sotheby's Baden-Baden in 1899.

Konstantin became a lieutenant colonel in the Baden army and served as adjutant to the Grand Duke of Baden. On 14 May 1831, he succeeded his father and became 2nd Prince and Lord of the remaining Baden part of the Salm-Krautheim estate. In order to pay off his father's debts, he sold the part of the inherited estate that was under Baden sovereignty to the Grand Duchy of Baden for 1,103,976 guilders in 1839, after he had acquired the manor of Hersberg Castle from the House of Württemberg in 1838. In the same year, he established a family fideicommissum for all his property by house law. In the same year, the Grand Duke Leopold of Baden issued a declaration on the constitutional status of Konstantin and his princely house, in which the privileges of the high nobility were confirmed for him and the members of his family.

== Personal life ==
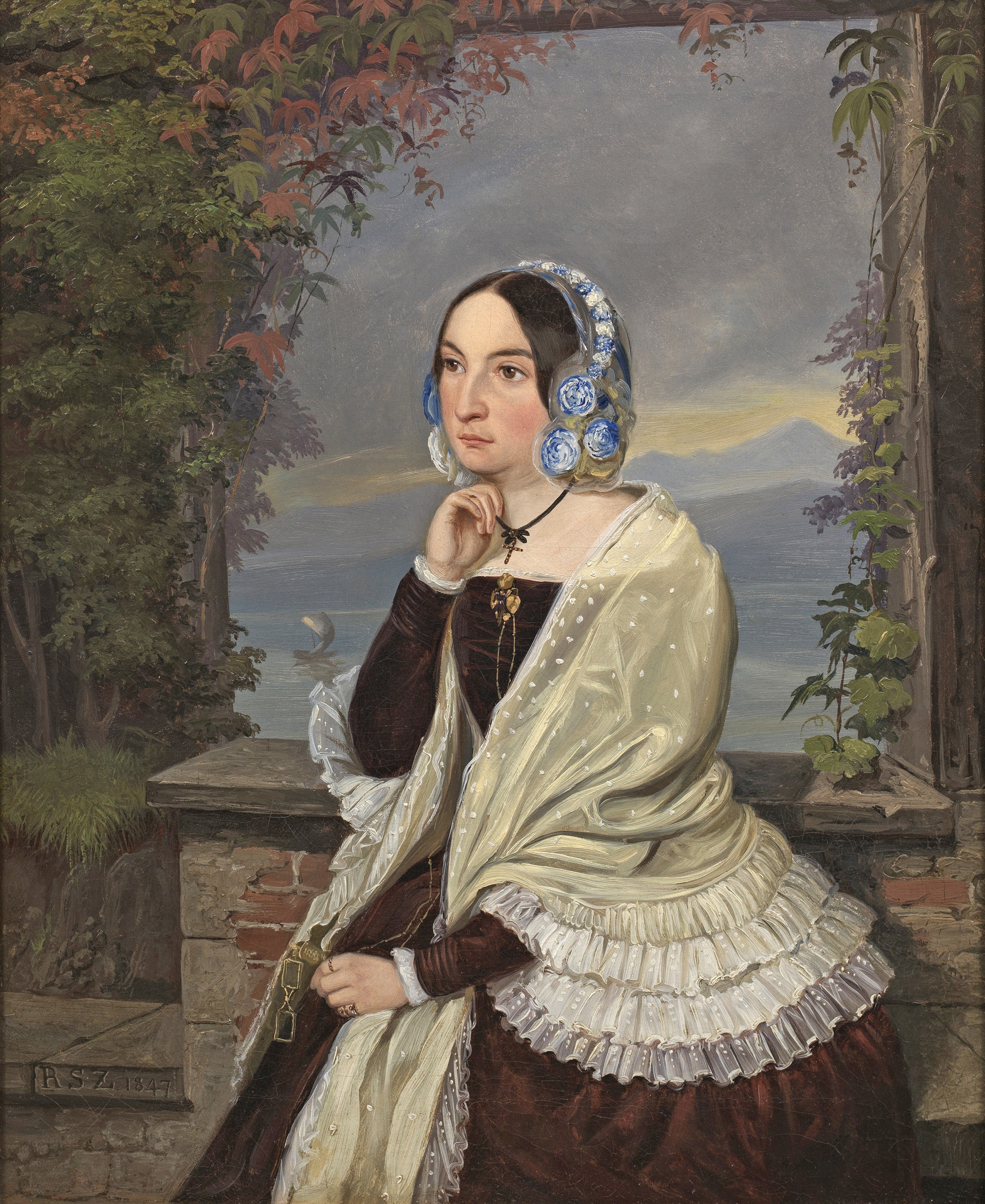
Portrait of his wife, Princess Charlotte, by Reinhard Sebastian Zimmermann, 1847

on 27 May 1826 at Haltenbergstetten Castle, Konstantin married Princess Charlotte Sophie Mathilde Franziska Xaverie Henriette of Hohenlohe-Jagstberg (1808–1873), a daughter of Charles Joseph, 1st Prince of Hohenlohe-Jagstberg, and Duchess Henriëtte of Württemberg. (Note: Duchess Henriette of Württemberg was the youngest of three daughters of Louis Eugene, Duke of Württemberg (the reigning Duke of Württemberg from 1793 until his death in 1795) and Countess Sophie Albertine von Beichlingen.) The couple had nine children:

- Franz Karl August, 3rd Prince of Salm-Reifferscheidt-Krautheim (1827–1860), who died unmarried.
- Princess Auguste Eleonore Sophie (1828–1859), who died unmarried.
- Prince Otto Clemens (1829–1859), who died unmarried.
- Countess Caroline (1830–1830), who died at birth.
- Countess Bertha (1831–1831), who died in infancy.
- Leopold Karl Aloys Hubert Longinus Maria, 4th Prince of Salm-Reifferscheidt-Krautheim (1833–1893), who inherited Dyck Castle from Prince Alfred of Salm-Reifferscheidt-Dyck in 1888; he married Anna Maria von Thurn und Valsassina-Como-Vercelli. After her death in 1864, he married Marie Christine Caroline Rosa Gabriele Adolphine von Spiegel zum Desenberg.
- Princess Franziska Antonie Auguste Crescentie Marie (1835–1852), who died unmarried.
- Princess Eleonore Aloysie Huberta Januaria Marie (1836–1922), who married Baron Stanislaus Bourguignon von Baumberg, in 1879.
- Prince Friedrich Karl Anton Ludwig Hubert Alois Berthold Wolfgang Maria (1843–1866), who was killed in the Battle of Náchod, the first major action of the Austro-Prussian War.

Prince Konstantin died on 10 February 1856 at Hersberg Castle, Grand Duchy of Baden. His widow died on 9 November 1873.

=== Descendants ===
Through his second son Leopold, he was a grandfather of Alfred, 5th Prince of Salm-Reifferscheidt-Krautheim (1863–1924), who married Countess Marie-Dorothea von Bellegarde.
