= Johanna Salm-Reifferscheid =

Czech painter

- Born: 18 March 1780; Prague
- Died: 13 September 1857 (aged 77); Prague
- Occupation: Painter
- Spouse(s): Franz Vincenz of Salm-Reifferscheid-Krautheim
- Awards: Order of the Starry Cross

Johanna Maria, Countess of Salm-Reifferscheid (18 March 1780 – 13 September 1857) was a Czech painter of landscapes and still lifes featuring fruit and flowers. She signed her paintings Jenny Salm.

She was born Johanna Maria, Countess of Pachta-Rayhofen on 18 March 1780 in Prague. In 1801, she married Franz Vincenz, Count of Salm-Reifferscheid-Krautheim. She served as lady-in-waiting to the Empress of Austria and was a member of the Order of the Starry Cross. Her works were in the collection of the Patriotischen Kunstfreunde (The Society of Patriotic Friends of the Arts, the forerunner of the National Gallery Prague) and were exhibited in Prague.

Johanna Salm-Reifferscheid died on 13 September 1857 in Prague.

== Gallery ==
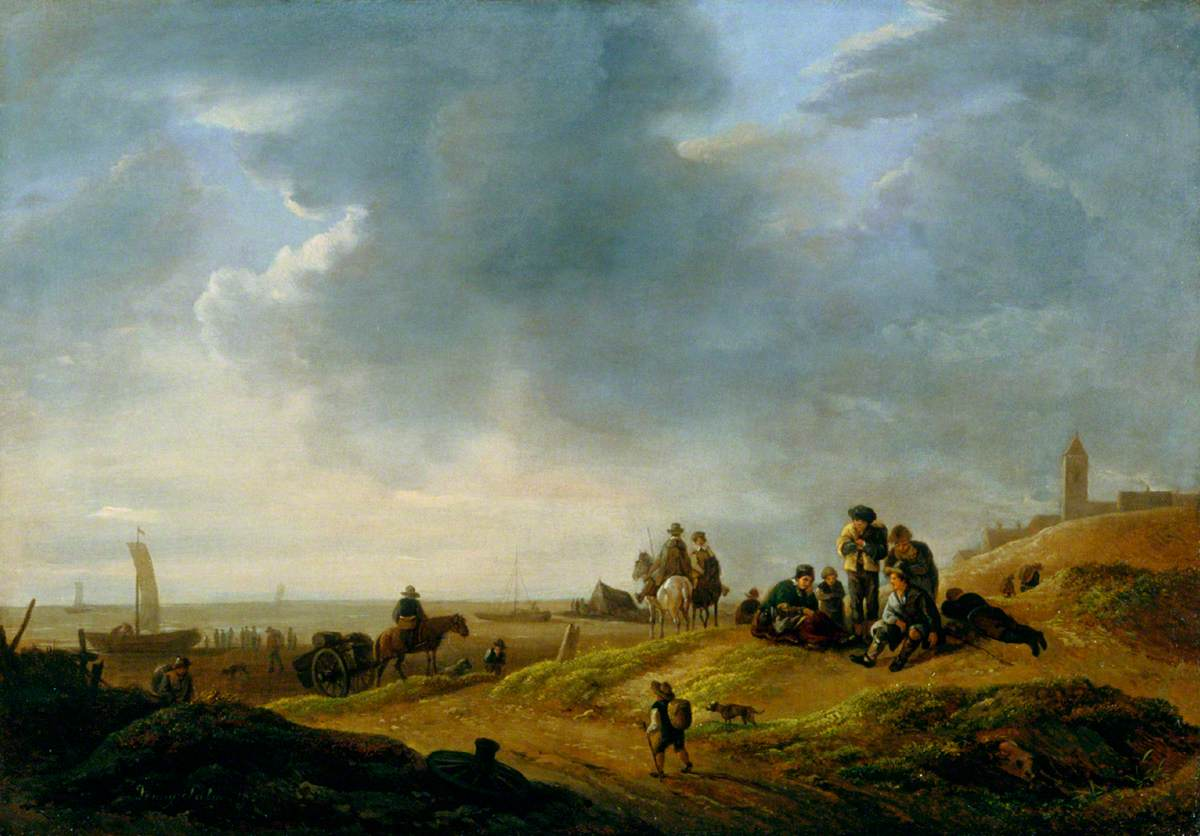
View of a Dutch Shore

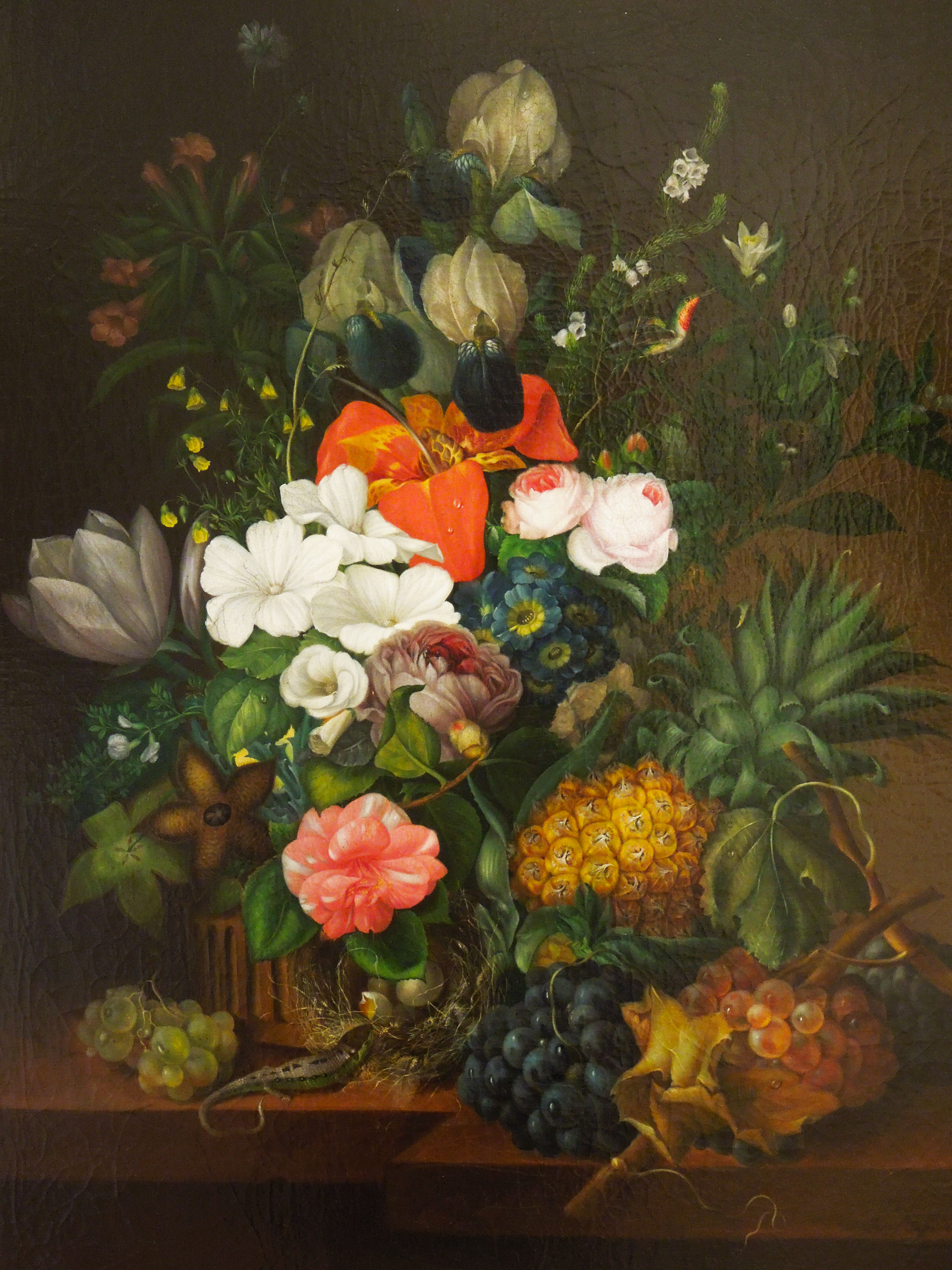
Still Life with a Lizard and Flowers
