= Baumberg (disambiguation) =

Baumberg is part of the city of Monheim am Rhein in Germany.

Baumberg may also refer to:

- Anton Bourguignon von Baumberg (1808–1879), Austro-Hungarian admiral
- Gabriele von Baumberg (1768–1839), Austrian writer and poet
- Jeremy Baumberg (born 1967), British professor of nanoscience

See also
