= Princess Isabelle of Salm-Salm =

Princess Isabelle
- Countess of Loë
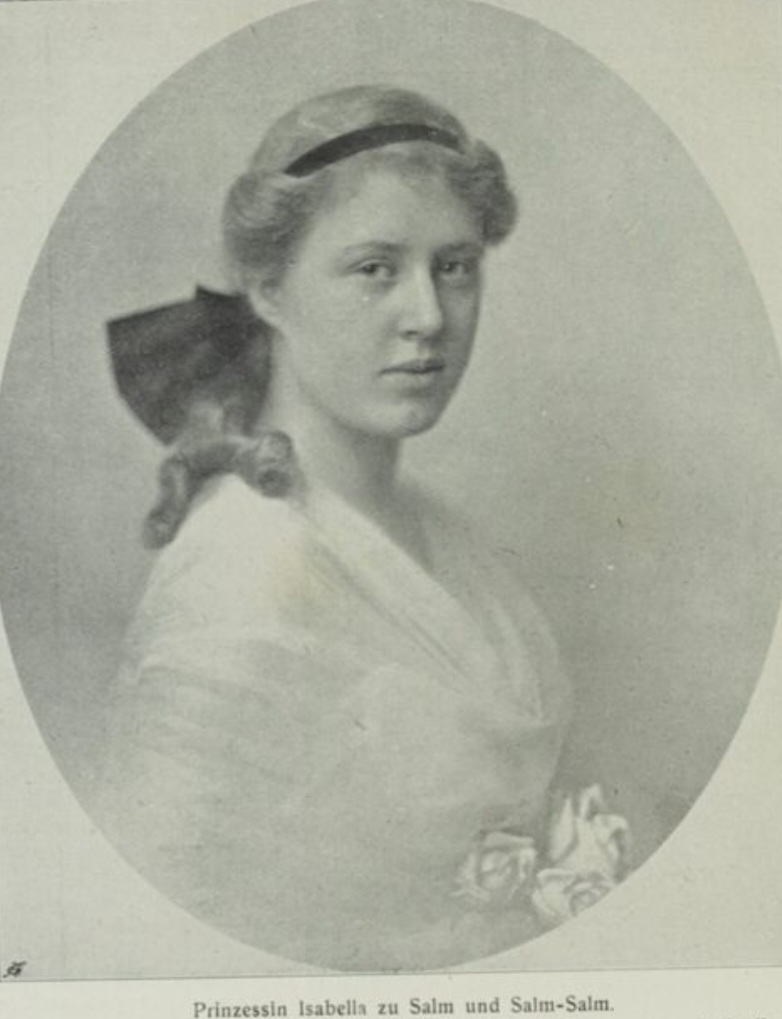
- Isabelle in 1918
- Born: 13 February 1903; Potsdam, Brandenburg, German Empire
- Died: 10 January 2009 (aged 105); Kevelaer, Germany
- Spouse: Felix, Count von Loë (m. 1925; died 1944)
- Issue: Fritz von Loe; Christine von Loe; Wessel von Loe; Elisabeth von Loe; Paula von Loe; Franz von Loe; Maria Rosa von Loe
Names
- Isabelle Maria Rosa Katherina Antonia
- House: Salm-Salm
- Father: Emanuel, Hereditary Prince of Salm-Salm
- Mother: Archduchess Maria Christina of Austria

Princess Isabelle of Salm-Salm (German: Isabelle Maria Rosa Katherina Antonia, Prinzessin zu Salm-Salm; 13 February 1903 – 10 January 2009) was the child of Emanuel, Hereditary Prince of Salm-Salm and a member of the House of Salm-Salm. She was the longest lived royal European centenarian to have ever lived.

== Early life and family ==
She was born as Princess Isabelle Maria Rosa Katherina Antonia of Salm and Salm-Salm as the eldest of five siblings. Her parents were Emanuel, Hereditary Prince of Salm-Salm and the Archduchess Maria Christina of Austria.

She spent her childhood with her siblings in Potsdam, where her father served in the bodyguard of Crown Prince Wilhelm of Prussia. Her mother was close friends with Crown Princess Cecilie. She had two sisters and two brothers: Princess Rosemary of Salm-Salm, Prince Nikolaus of Salm-Salm, Princess Cäcilie of Salm-Salm and Prince Franz of Salm-Salm. The youngest brother died of diphtheria at the age of four.

== World War I and wedding ==
After the death of her father in the First World War on the Eastern front, the family moved to their ancestral home of Anholt Castle in Isselburg. Isabelle spent her youth there and met Count Felix von Loë of Wissen Castle and fell in love with him. The wedding of the 22-year-old princess with the 29-year-old Count von Loë took place on September 2, 1925 in Anholt. Through her marriage to von Loë, Isabell became Countess of Loë in 1925 and moved into Wissen Castle. The couple had seven children.

== World War II and aftermath ==
After the wedding, she devoted herself to the preservation and reconstruction of Wissen Castle and the Wissen businesses. In 1939 Felix von Loë was called up into the Wehrmacht and had to go to the front. Isabelle looked after the property and took over the management of the Wissen businesses. She only saw her husband during the short front leave. In 1944 he died at the front in Latvia. The same year, her eldest son Fritz was drafted into military service and lost an eye to a grenade splinter.

Committed to her faith and Christian virtues, she took part in the resistance against National Socialism. She used her contacts with the noble families and members of the Catholic Action to save numerous people from the concentration camp and to rescue innocent prisoners from the penitentiaries, including a priest from Leipzig, whom she smuggled past the Gestapo into the Netherlands. The actions were not without danger. Many of the Catholic bishops were too willing to compromise with the National Socialist state. Cardinal von Galen rejected their support for the persecuted and the inconvenient as being inappropriate. In Emilie von Loë from Budberg (Rheinberg), a close relative, Isabelle found a trustworthy comrade-in-arms.

When the area on the left bank of the Lower Rhine was to be evacuated in the last months of the war, Isabelle refused the order of the SS and founded the Wissen Emergency Community together with her colleagues and neighbors. A medical station was set up at Wissen Castle, where numerous wounded soldiers were treated, including the VDK founder Siegfried Emmo Eulen. When the German Wehrmacht retreated, the Niers bridge at the castle was blown up, which affected the electricity and drinking water supplies on the estate. The Emergency Community held out and survived the bombing raids on Weeze, Goch and Kleve with numerous refugees in the cellars of the outer bailey. In gratitude for having survived, the community made a pilgrimage to the Gnadenkapelle in Kevelaer. A memorial cross was erected at the entrance to the castle.

After the liberation, British soldiers moved into the castle and in April 1945 set up a POW release camp on a field on the estate. They paid no attention to the countess's worries that the moated castle could collapse if the moat dried up. Only after warning of a dangerous plague of mosquitoes was she able to persuade the occupiers to repair the water pump. This not only saved the castle, but also the drinking water and electricity supplies.

She later learned about the conditions in the prisoner of war camp there from a pastor from Rheinberg and, together with people from her church community, organized food donations. The packages had to be thrown over the camp fence. In doing so, she exposed herself to the danger of being shot by the Americans. Her sister Rosemarie took part in the actions. It was under British military administration that food deliveries could be delivered to the supply camp without great risk. The neighboring communities were even obliged to ensure supplies.

The war on the Lower Rhine claimed numerous victims, who could only be recovered during the reconstruction period. For the construction of the Weeze war cemetery, Isabelle donated a 2-hectare plot of land on the Sandberg from her property to the Volksbund Deutscher Kriegsgräberfürsorge. After the death of her husband, she did not marry again. Her main focus was on raising her children and looking after Wissen Castle and the Wissen businesses. The land reform in North Rhine-Westphalia in 1949 put the estate in danger, as it only allowed a maximum of 100 hectares of land. However, a turn of events and the negotiating skills of Rentmeister Aloys Kempkes prevented major land losses.

== Post-War and later life ==
When her son Fritz married Countess Inez von Boeselager in 1957, her mother left the castle and the administration to them. Isabelle moved to Kevelaer and became more involved in the Catholic women's community of St. Marien. There she became chairwoman of the association.

== Old age and death ==
Isabelle had 23 grandchildren and 65 great-grandchildren. She witnessed the end of the imperial era, the turmoil of the Weimar Republic and the two world wars, the founding of the Federal Republic of Germany up to modern times from her long life. On January 10, 2009, Isabelle von Loë died in her house in Kevelaer at the age of 105, having outlived her husband by 65 years. The funeral service took place on January 18, 2009 with over 300 people in the St. Mary's Basilica in Kevelaer. She was buried in the Catholic cemetery in Weeze next to her husband.

== Ancestry ==
Through her maternal grandfather, she was first cousins, once removed with King Alfonso XIII of Spain; through them, she is second cousins, twice removed, with King Felipe VI of Spain.

Ancestors of Princess Isabelle of Salm-Salm

8. Alfred, 5th Prince of Salm-Salm
4. Alfred, 7th Prince of Salm-Salm
9. Princess Auguste de Croÿ
2. Emanuel, Hereditary Prince of Salm-Salm
10. Franz, Count von Lützow
5. Countess Rosa von Lützow
11. Henriette Seymour
1. Princess Isabelle of Salm-Salm
12. Archduke Karl Ferdinand of Austria
6. Archduke Friedrich, Duke of Teschen
13. Archduchess Elisabeth Franziska of Austria
3. Archduchess Maria Christina of Austria
14. Rudolf, Duke of Croÿ
7. Princess Isabella de Croÿ
15. Princess Natalie of Ligne
