= Franz, 1st Prince of Salm-Reifferscheidt-Krautheim =

Franz Wilhelm
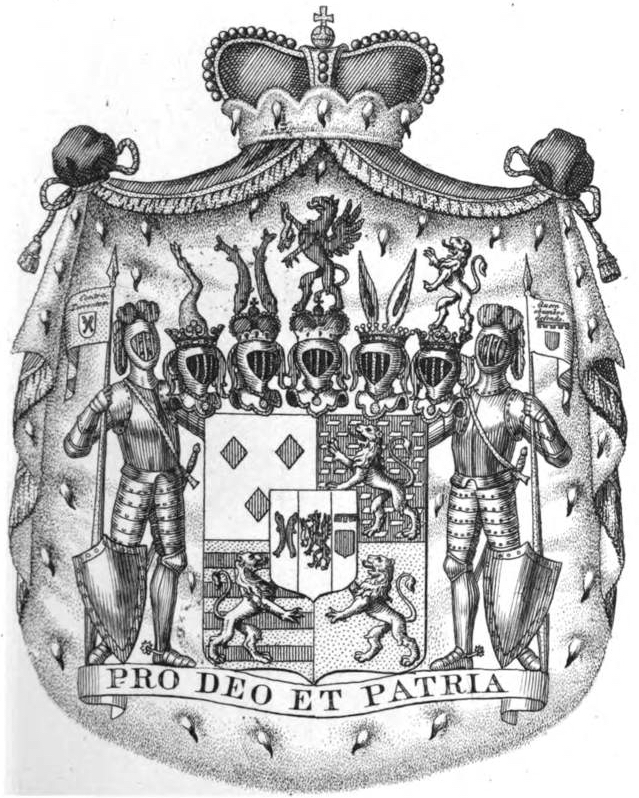

Prince of Salm-Reifferscheidt-Krautheim
- Reign: 1803–1806 (mediatized in 1806)
- Predecessor: None
- Successor: Konstantin
- Born: 27 April 1772; Bedburg
- Died: 14 May 1831 (aged 59); Konstanz, Kingdom of Württemberg
- Spouse: Princess Franziska of Hohenlohe-Bartenstein (m. 1796; died 1812) Princess Marianne Dorothea Galitzin (m. 1818; died 1823)
Names
- Franz Wilhelm Joseph Anton zu Salm-Reifferscheidt-Krautheim
- Father: Count Siegmund of Salm-Reifferscheidt-Bedburg
- Mother: Countess Eleonore of Waldburg-Zeil-Wurzach

Franz Wilhelm Joseph Anton, 1st Prince of Salm-Reifferscheidt-Krautheim (27 April 1772 – 14 May 1831) was a Prussian major general. He was Ruling Imperial Count from 1798 to 1804, became Ruling Imperial Prince in 1804 and was mediatized in 1806, and then Standesherr of the Kingdom of Württemberg (until 1826) and the Grand Duchy of Baden.

== Early life ==
Franz Wilhelm was born on 27 April 1772 in Bedburg as a member of the House of Salm-Reifferscheidt-Bedburg, which descended agnatically from the noble Reifferscheid family. His parents were Count Siegmund of Salm-Reifferscheidt-Bedburg (1735–1798), Imperial Chamberlain and Chief Court Master of the Electorate of Cologne, and Countess Eleonore of Waldburg-Zeil-Wurzach (1735–1804). Prince Franz Wilhelm's youngest brother, Count Franz Joseph Anton of Salm-Reifferscheidt-Krautheim, was a Canon of Cologne. (Note: His brother, Count Franz Joseph Anton of Salm-Reifferscheidt-Krautheim (1778–1851), had two illegitimate sons with Apollonia Isabelle Muck: Karl von Krutheim (1809–1836) and Ludwig von Krutheim (1819–1885). In 1827, they received the Baden nobility of von Krutheim from the sovereign of the Krautheim princely house, Grand Duke Ludwig I in Karlsruhe.)

== Career ==
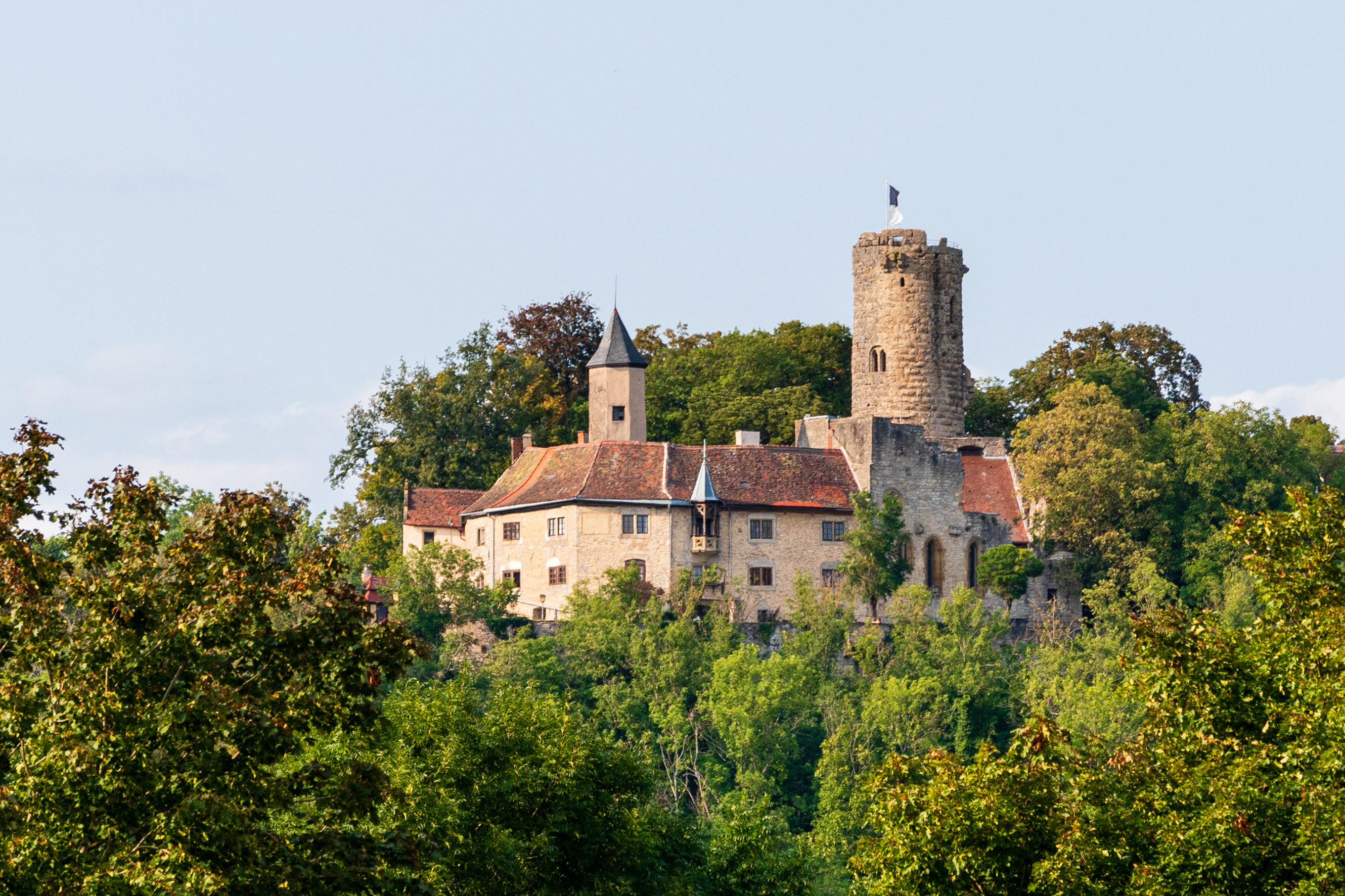
Krautheim Castle

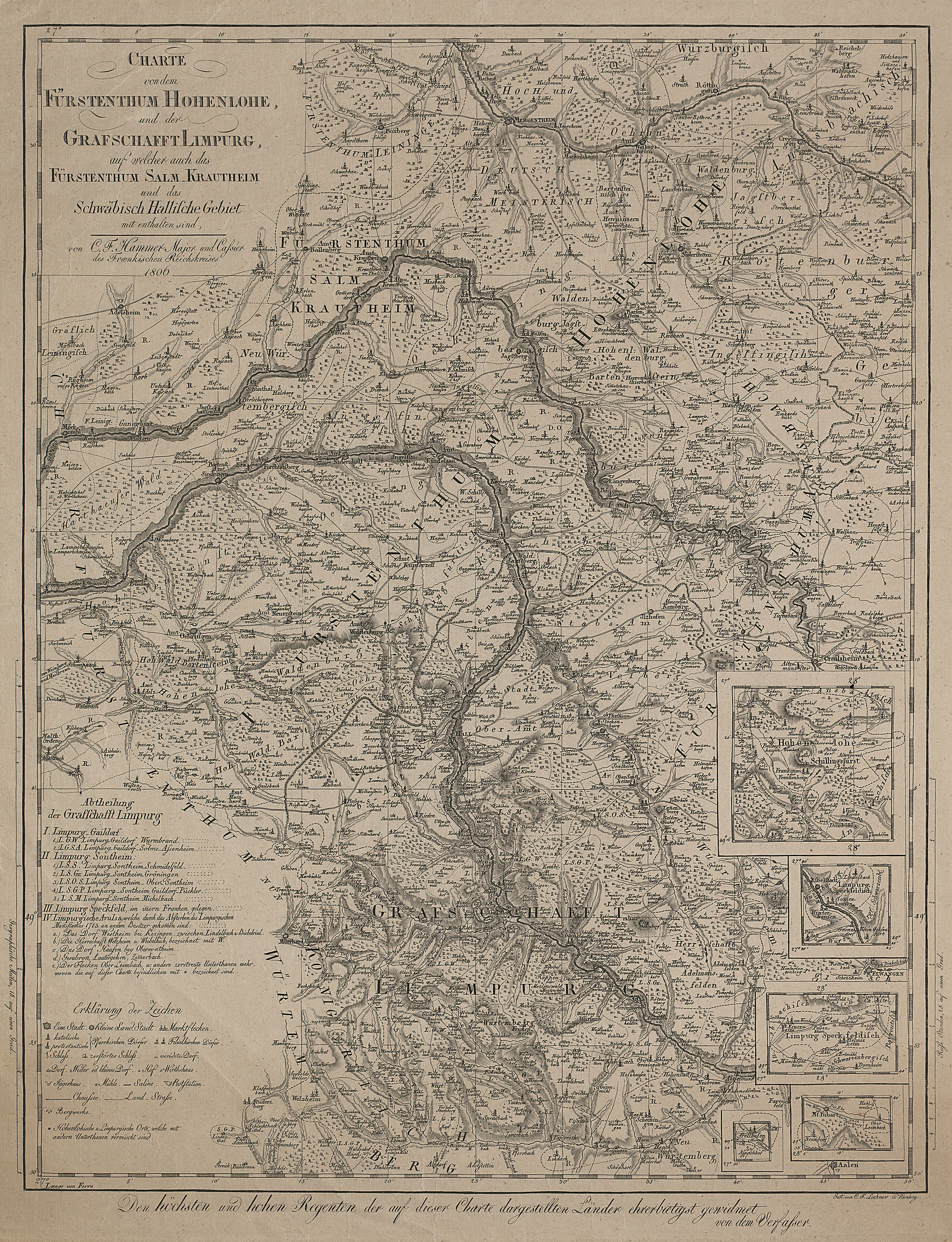
Map of the Principality of Krautheim, 1806

Salm-Reifferscheidt began his career in the Prussian army on 16 December 1796, as a lieutenant colonel, a titular officer. In 1798, he became the ruling Count of Bedburg and Erp. He was promoted to colonel on 30 November 1802, and lost his lordship of Bedburg that same year as a result of the Peace of Lunéville.

According to the provisions of the Reichsdeputationshauptschluss (Imperial Deputation Act of 1803), he and his family were compensated for the loss of the territories on the left bank of the Rhine by a principality formed from Mainz and Würzburg possessions. It consisted of the Schöntal Monastery, the Krautheim District Office, the Gerlachsheim Priory and the Grünsfeld Office. On 7 January 1804 in Vienna, he was raised to the rank of Imperial Prince by primogeniture, which made him the founder of the Salm-Reifferscheidt-Krautheim line. For this princely dignity, a tax of 30,071 florins was due. Franz Wilhelm paid the Imperial Chancellery a portion in cash and had a deed of debt and pledge drawn up for the remaining sum, with interest at 4 percent, which he passed on to his new principality itself, thus burdening his subjects.

In 1806, he became Würzburg's Chief Master of the Hunt. Franz Wilhelm continued his military career on 2 October 1815, as commander of the Rhenish Landwehr Regiment. On 30 March 1818, he transferred to the same position in the 1st Düsseldorf Landwehr Regiment and finally became commander of the 2nd Combined Reserve Landwehr Regiment on 26 March 1820. On 15 June 1822, he retired from active service with the rank of major general.

Salm-Reifferscheidt was a Knight of the Bavarian Order of St. Hubertus, holder of the Grand Cross of the Tuscan Order of St. Joseph, and of the Württemberg Order of the Golden Eagle. In 1826, he sold the estates in the Oberamt Künzelsau under Württemberg sovereignty, part of his estate of Krautheim, to the Kingdom of Württemberg for 125,000 guilders, and thus retired from the First Chamber of the Estates. Since he retained the part of the estate of the Principality of Krautheim that was under Baden sovereignty, he retained his status as a Baden estate.

=== Bankruptcy proceedings ===
When formal bankruptcy proceedings were opened against Prince Franz Wilhelm on 6 June 1809, the Vienna Imperial Chancellery claimed the remaining debt of the 1804 assessment for the principality, which is why his son, and successor, sued before the Baden Court of Justice in Karlsruhe in 1836. Because Franz Wilhelm had passed the costs of the elevation of rank on to his land in 1804, in his view these were not debts that belonged to him, but to the Principality of Krautheim. Since sovereignty over it passed to Baden and Württemberg through its mediatization in 1806, these states were the legal successors to the Imperial Principality of Salm-Krautheim, and they would also have to bear the costs of the increase. The case of Prince of Salm against the Grand Ducal Treasury was heard in 1836 at the Baden Court of Justice in Karlsruhe. Baden argued that the Krautheim subjects had not objected to the elevation, but that they had not been consulted and that they had not benefited from their then new sovereign becoming a Prince. And finally, if someone could not afford the costs of the elevation, they should have been content with their old status.

== Personal life ==
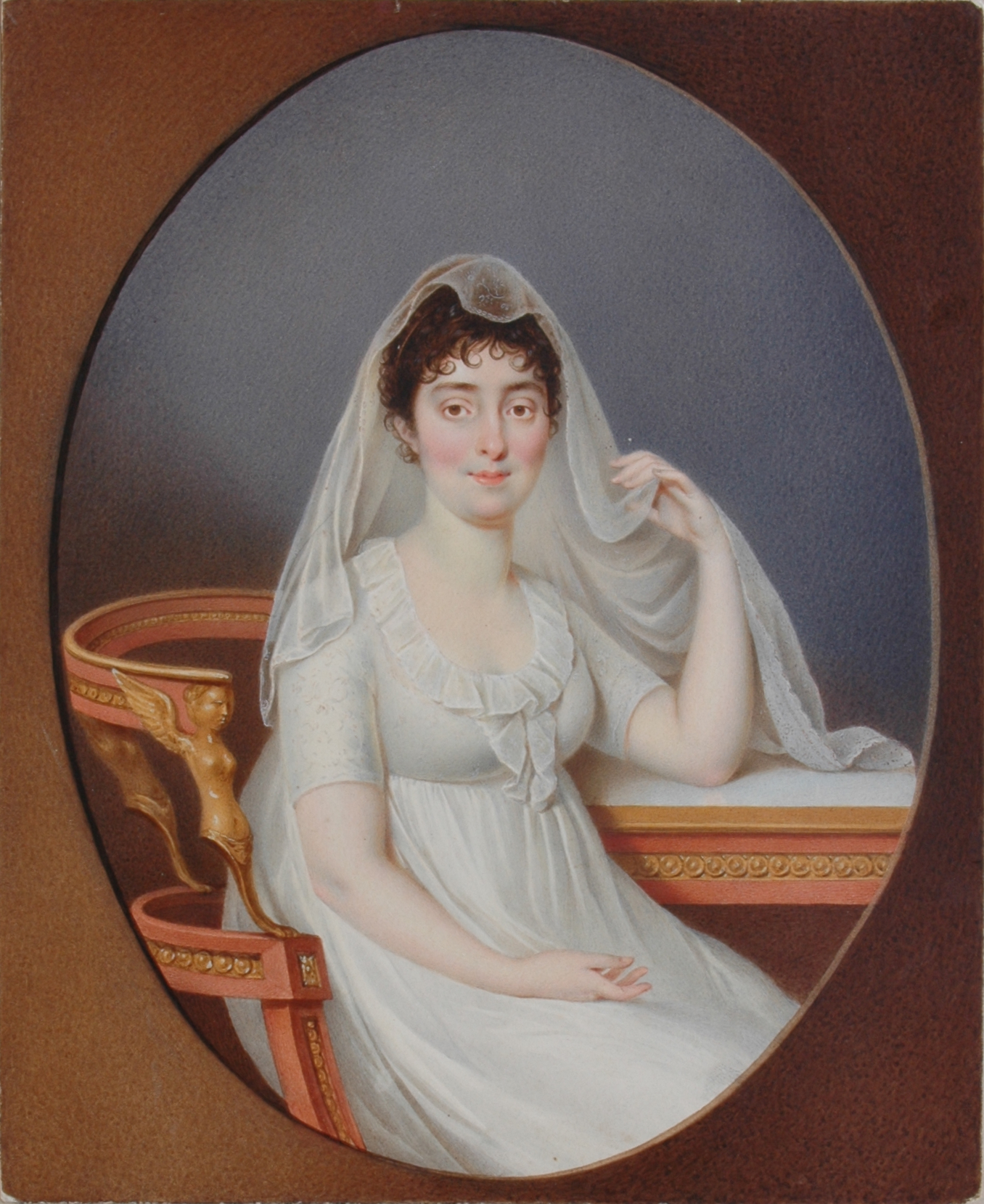
Portrait of his first wife, Princess Franziska of Hohenlohe-Bartenstein

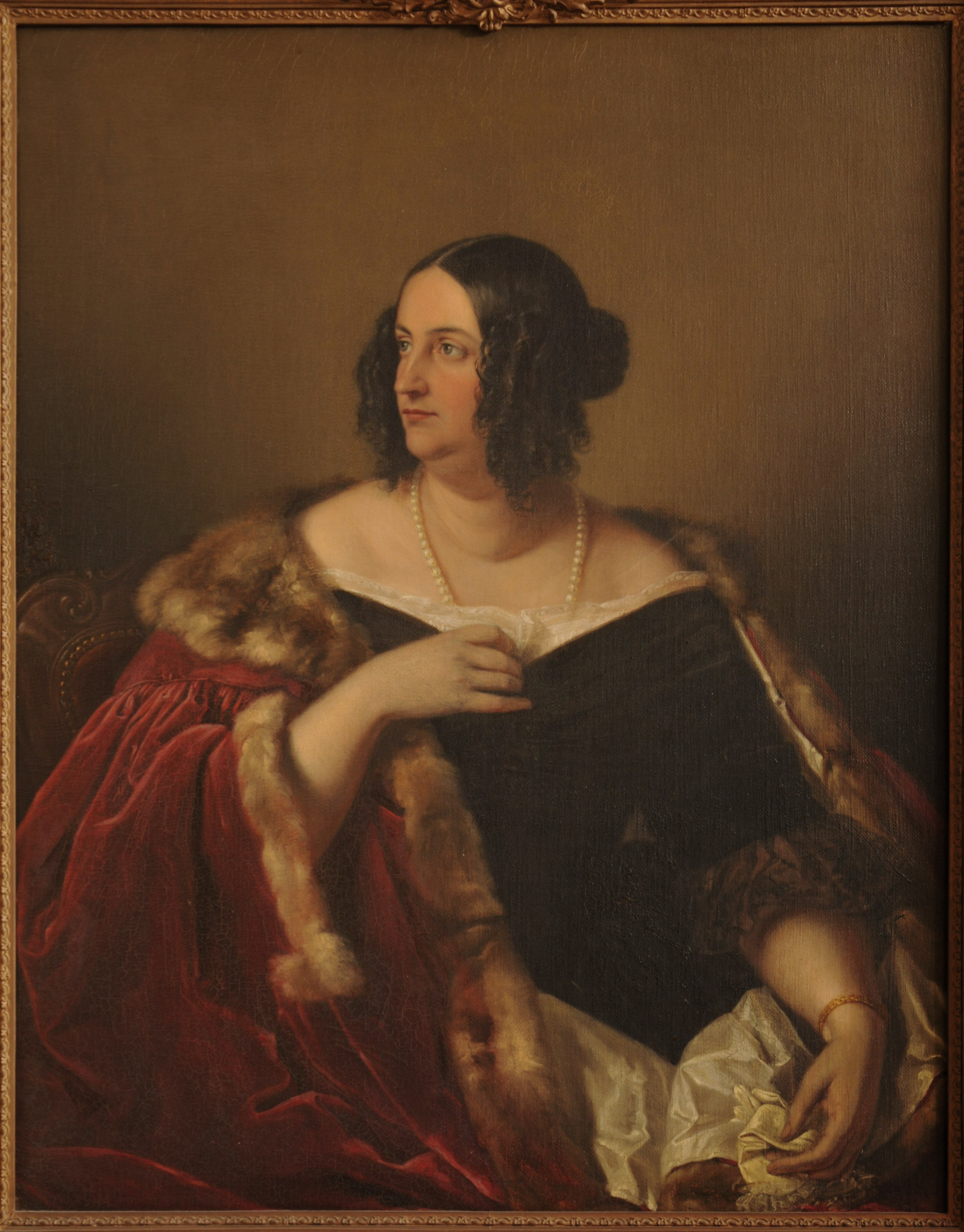
Portrait of his eldest daughter, Princess Eleanore, by Engelbert Seibertz

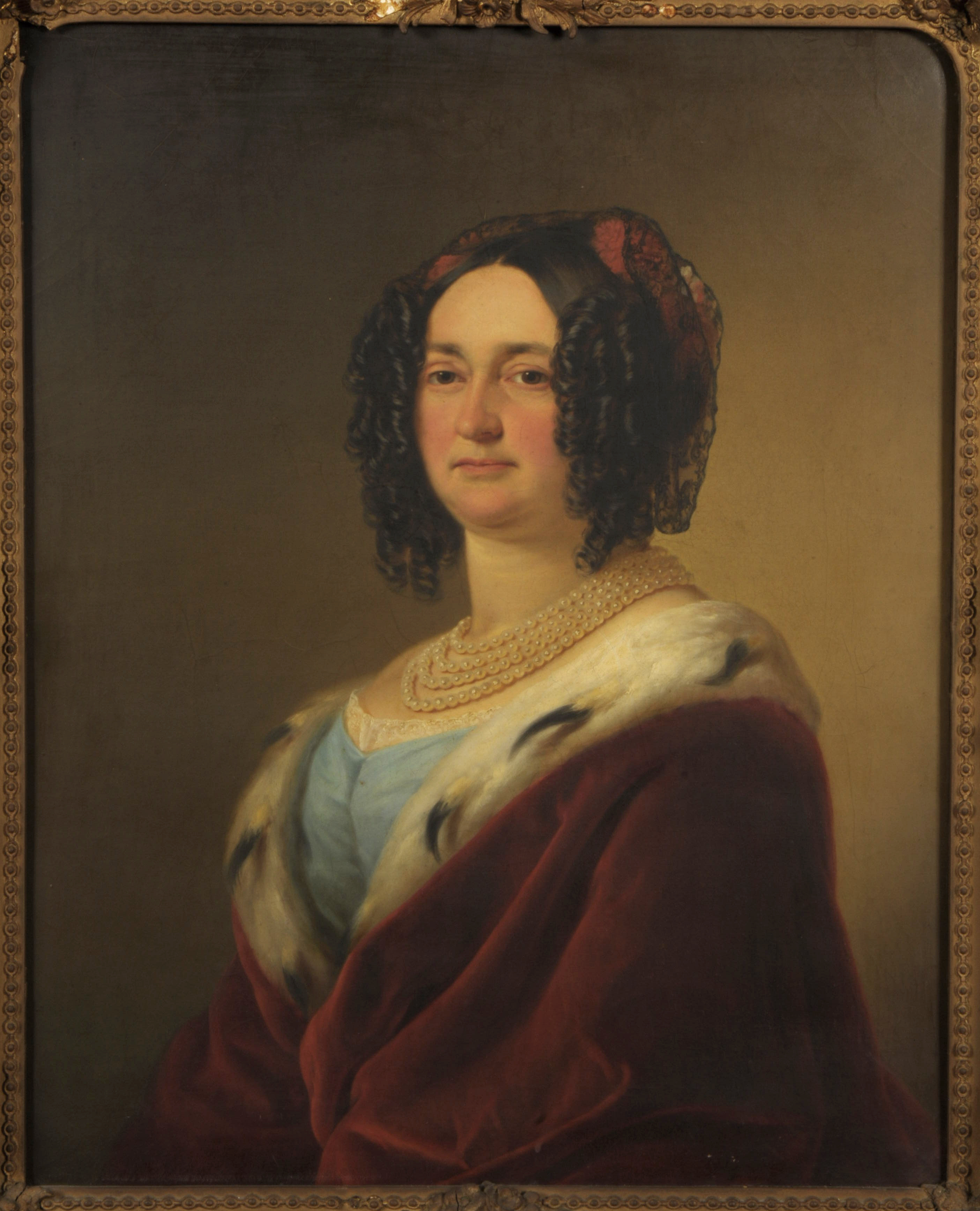
Portrait of his daughter, Princess Leopoldina, by Jan Adolf Brandeis

In 1796, Franz Wilhelm married his first wife, Princess Franziska Luise of Hohenlohe-Bartenstein (1770–1812), a daughter of Louis Charles, 2nd Prince of Hohenlohe-Waldenburg-Bartenstein, and Countess Polyxena von Limburg-Stirum. Among her siblings were Louis Aloysius, Prince of Hohenlohe-Waldenburg-Bartenstein and Charles Joseph, 1st Prince of Hohenlohe-Jagstberg. Before her death in 1812, they were the parents of:

- Count Ludwig Karl of Salm-Reifferscheidt-Bedburg (1797–1797), who died young.
- Prince Konstantin Dominik Franz of Salm-Reifferscheidt-Krautheim (1798–1856), who married his cousin, Princess Charlotte of Hohenlohe-Bartenstein-Jagstberg (1808–1873), daughter of Charles Joseph, 1st Prince of Hohenlohe-Jagstberg and Princess Henriette of Württemberg, (Note: Princess Henriette of Württemberg was the youngest of three daughters of Louis Eugene, Duke of Württemberg (the reigning Duke of Württemberg from 1793 until his death in 1795) and Countess Sophie Albertine von Beichlingen.) in 1826.
- Princess Eleanore of Salm-Reifferscheidt-Krautheim (1799–1851), who married, as his third wife, Victor Amadeus, Landgrave of Hesse-Rotenburg, the son of Charles Emmanuel, Landgrave of Hesse-Rotenburg and Princess Leopoldina of Liechtenstein (a daughter of Prince Franz Josef I), in 1831.
- Count Karl Borromäus of Salm-Reifferscheidt-Bedburg (1801–1802), who died young.
- Princess Kottialtis Luise Polyxena of Salm-Reifferscheidt-Krautheim (1802–1818), who died young.
- Prince Karl Joseph Ernst Maria Guido of Salm-Reifferscheidt-Krautheim (1803–1864), who married, morganatically, to Thekla Strobel, a daughter of Franz Xaver Strobel, the Baden Court cook from Salem and Marie Grünwald, in 1841. (Note: Prince Karl's wife was given the surname Roesdorff-Salm and the children from the marriage the surname Roesdorff. Prince Karl later petitioned the Grand Duke of Baden for his children to be raised to the Baden nobility and to have their name changed to Roesdorff-Salm. The latter request was granted, but it was his son, Hermann Roesdorff-Salm, who was granted the Liechtenstein nobility and baronial status as von Roesdorff in 1872 in Vienna as a Prussian lieutenant. In Prussia, this ennoblement was not initially recognized, unlike in Baden. And so, on 2 April 1896, Lieutenant Colonel Hermann Roesdorff-Salm, who was in Prussian service, took up the office of bailiff in Greven without any nobility particle. However, an expert opinion on nobility law was drawn up and the genealogy of the Roesdorff family was included in the baronial section of the Gotha Genealogical Pocketbook as early as 1875.)
- Princess Leopoldine Josephine Christiane Polyxena Salm-Reifferscheidt-Krautheim (1805–1878), who married Hugo, 2nd Prince of Salm-Reifferscheidt-Raitz, son of Count Hugo Franz of Salm-Reifferscheidt-Raitz, in 1830.
- Princess Maria Crescentia Polyxena of Salm-Reifferscheidt-Krautheim (1806–1878), who died unmarried.

After the death of his first wife in 1812, he married a Princess Marianne Dorothea Galitzin (1769–1823), a daughter of Prince Dmitri Alekseyevich Golitsyn and Countess Amalie von Schmettau (the daughter of the Prussian Field Marshal Count Samuel von Schmettau), in 1818. Among her siblings were Prince Demetrius Augustine Gallitzin.

Prince Franz died on 14 May 1831 at Konstanz. In 1839, his son and heir Prince Konstantin also sold the part of the princely estate of the Principality of Salm-Krautheim, which had remained under Baden sovereignty after the sale of the Württemberg part by Franz Wilhelm in 1826, for 1,103,976 guilders to the Grand Duchy of Baden to pay off debts. In 1839, he established a family fideicommissum by house law from the remaining proceeds of the sale and from the manor (lordship) purchased in the Kingdom of Württemberg in 1838, including Hersberg Castle on Lake Constance. In the Grand Duchy of Baden, he became a standesherrlicher Personalist.

=== Descendants ===
Through his daughter Leopoldine, he was a grandfather of: Hugo, 3rd Prince of Salm-Reifferscheidt-Raitz (who married Princess Elisabeth of Liechtenstein, a daughter of Prince Karl Joseph of Liechtenstein); Countess Augusta of Salm-Reifferscheidt-Raitz (who married Count Heinrich Jaroslaw Clam-Martinic, a son of Count Karl Johann Nepomuk of Clam-Martinic and the former Lady Selina Meade, a daughter of the 2nd Earl of Clanwilliam); Count Siegfried of Salm-Reifferscheid-Raitz (who married Countess Rudolfine Czernin von und zu Chudenitz, a daughter of Count Jaromir Czernin von und zu Chudenitz and Countess Karolina Schaffgotsch); and Count Erich of Salm-Reifferscheidt-Raitz (who married Donna Maria Alvarez de Toledo, a daughter of Don Ignacio Álvarez de Toledo Palafox and Teresa Álvarez de Toledo Silva-Bazán). (Note: Don Ignacio Álvarez de Toledo Palafox (1812–1878), the youngest son of Francisco de Borja Álvarez de Toledo, 12th Marquis of Villafranca, married his niece, Teresa Álvarez de Toledo Silva-Bazán (1824–1883), the daughter of Don Ignacio Álvarez's elder brother, Pedro de Alcántara Álvarez de Toledo, 13th Marquess of Villafranca.)
