= Nazario Sauro =

Austrian-born Italian irredentist and sailor

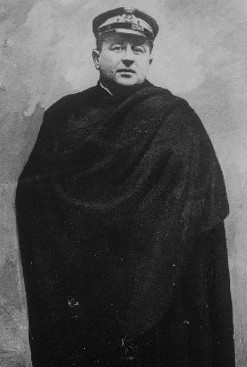
- Sauro in 1915

Personal information
- Nationality: Italian
- Born: 20 September 1880 Capodistria, Austrian Littoral (now Koper, Slovenia)
- Died: 10 August 1916 (aged 35) Pula, Austria-Hungary (now Croatia)

Sailing career
- Sport: Sailing

Nazario Sauro (20 September 1880 – 10 August 1916) was an Austrian-born Italian irredentist and sailor.

== Life ==
Born in Capodistria, in what was then the Austrian Littoral (today Koper, Slovenia), he took to sailing from a very young age and became the captain of a cargo ship when he was only 20. Later, in 1910, Sauro became an employee of the shipping company Zuttiati, connecting ports in Istria and Dalmatia to San Giorgio di Nogaro and Cervignano del Friuli.

After 1866, when Venice and the region consisting of the Republic of Venice were annexed to Italy, there was some support in Istria, which had been under Venetian rule in the past, for unification with Italy. Tino Gavardo, Pio Riego Gambini and Nazario Sauro were the most renowned of those who promoted Istrian unification to the Kingdom of Italy. During World War I, many who held such views enrolled in the Italian Army to fight the Austrian Empire. Some were captured and hanged as traitors by the Austrians.

Upon the outbreak of World War I, Sauro went to Venice to join other refugees who had gathered there and were pressuring Italy to join the conflict on the Entente side. When Italy joined the effort in 1915, Sauro was a volunteer in the Italian Navy, assigned to a torpedo unit, accomplishing over 60 missions over a period of 14 months. In June 1916, he was promoted Sub-Lieutenant on the Giacinto Pullino submarine, and awarded a Silver Medal.

On 30 July of that year, Sauro's boat was sent over to carry out sabotage in the Hungarian port of Fiume (now Rijeka in Croatia), but it crashed into a rock in the Kvarner Gulf. The crew was intercepted by the Austro-Hungarian destroyer Satellit, and imprisoned. Sauro was recognized and placed on trial for his previous act of treason, and, after facing a military tribunal in Pola (now Pula in Croatia) was sentenced to death and hanged.

Even though his grave was not marked, it could be identified after the war. His remains were brought to the Naval Cemetery Pula in 1919. When Pula became a part of Croatia in 1947, his remains were once again transferred to the Lido di Venezia.

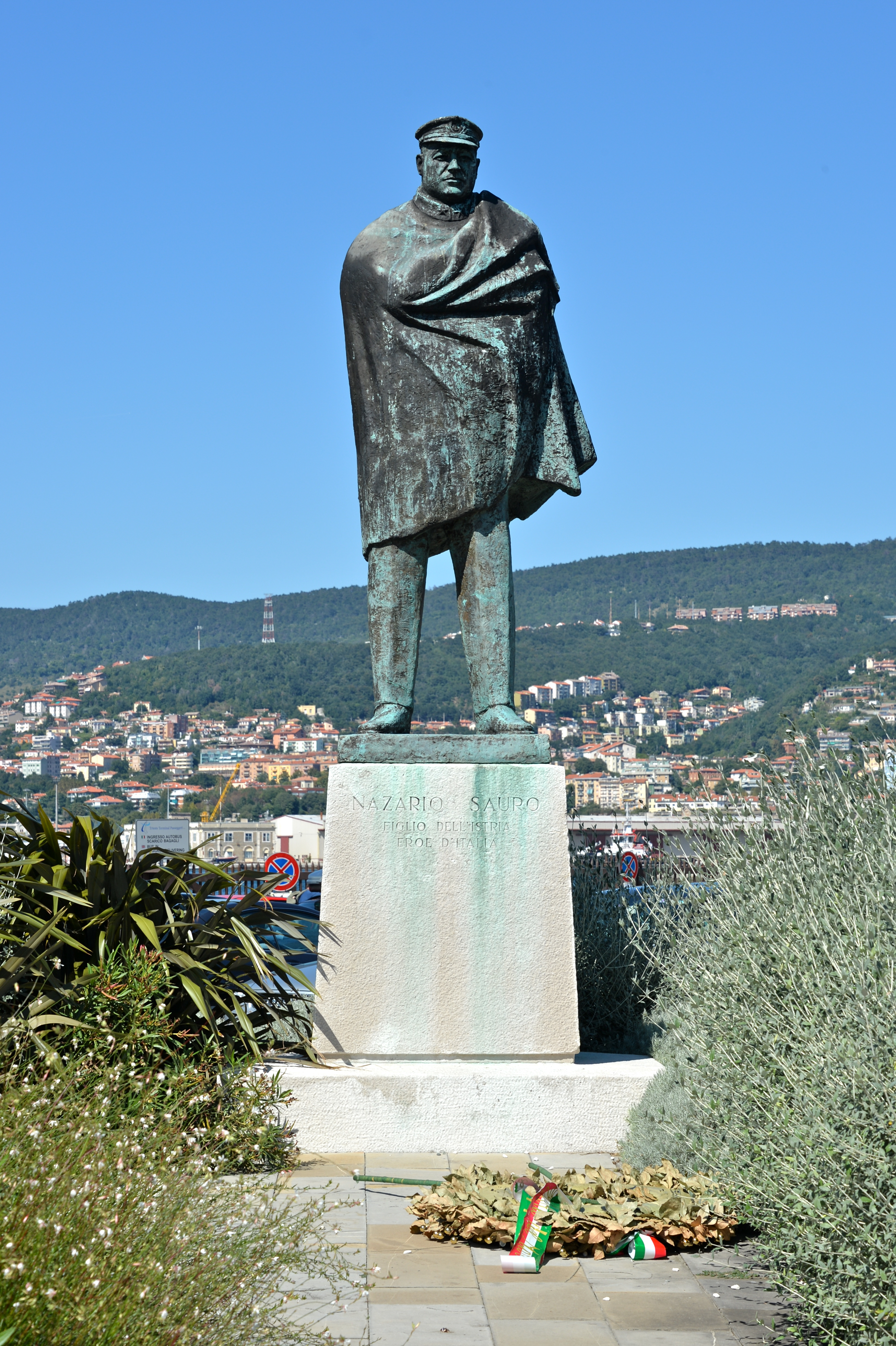
Monument at Trieste, Riva Nazario Sauro

Nazario Sauro wrote two letters to his familiars from his cell; after his death Gabriele D'Annunzio asked for them to be displayed as a permanent memory of Sauro's heroism. They are currently displayed at the Central Museum of Risorgimento in Rome. One of these, addressed to his wife, reads:

Dear Nina,
I can't but beg your pardon for leaving you alone with our five children still in need of your milk; I also know how hard you're going to fight and struggle in order to raise and leave them on the right path, which will hopefully be the same as their father. But I have nothing much to say than I am dying satisfied for having fulfilled my duty as an Italian. Be happy, for my happiness is nothing but knowing that the Italians knew how to fulfil [sic] their duty and did it. Dear soulmate, teach our children that their father was first of all an Italian, then a father and eventually a man. Nazario

— Venice, 20 May 1916 - letter of Nazario Sauro to his wife Nina

He is remembered as a hero of Italy. Two ships of the Italian Navy were named in his honour:

- The destroyer Nazario Sauro, built in 1926 and sunk in 1941
- The submarine Nazario Sauro, built in 1980 and taken out of service in 2009

== See also ==
- Italia irredenta
- Istrian Italians
- Risorgimento
- Cesare Battisti
- Guglielmo Oberdan
- Istrian-Dalmatian exodus

== Bibliography ==
- Carlo Pignatti Morano. La vita di Nazario Sauro ed il martirio dell'eroe, Milano, Fratelli Treves Editori, 1922
- Sem Benelli. Il Sauro, L'Eroica editrice. Trieste, 1919.
- Romano Sauro e Francesco Sauro, Nazario Sauro. Storia di un marinaio, Venezia, La Musa Talìa, 2013.
