= Archduchess Maria Christina of Austria (1879–1962) =

Archduchess Maria Christina
- Hereditary Princess of Salm-Salm
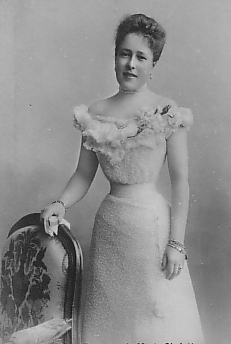
- Born: 17 November 1879; Cracow, Austria-Hungary
- Died: 6 August 1962 (aged 82); Anholt, West Germany
- Spouse: Emanuel, Hereditary Prince of Salm-Salm (m. 1902; died 1916)
- Issue: Isabelle, Baroness of Loë; Rosemary, Archduchess of Austria; Nikolaus Leopold, 8th Prince of Salm-Salm; Cäcilie, Princess of Salm-Reifferscheidt-Krautheim and Dyck; Prince Franz
Names
- German: Maria Christina Isabelle Natalie
- House: Habsburg-Lorraine
- Father: Archduke Friedrich, Duke of Teschen
- Mother: Princess Isabella of Croÿ

Archduchess Maria Christina Isabelle Natalie of Austria, (German: Maria Christina Isabelle Natalie, Erzherzogin von Österreich; 17 November 1879 – 6 August 1962) was a member of the Teschen branch of the House of Habsburg-Lorraine and an Archduchess of Austria and Princess of Bohemia, Hungary, and Tuscany by birth. Through her marriage to Emanuel Alfred, Hereditary Prince of Salm-Salm, Maria Christina was also Hereditary Princess of Salm-Salm.

== Early life ==
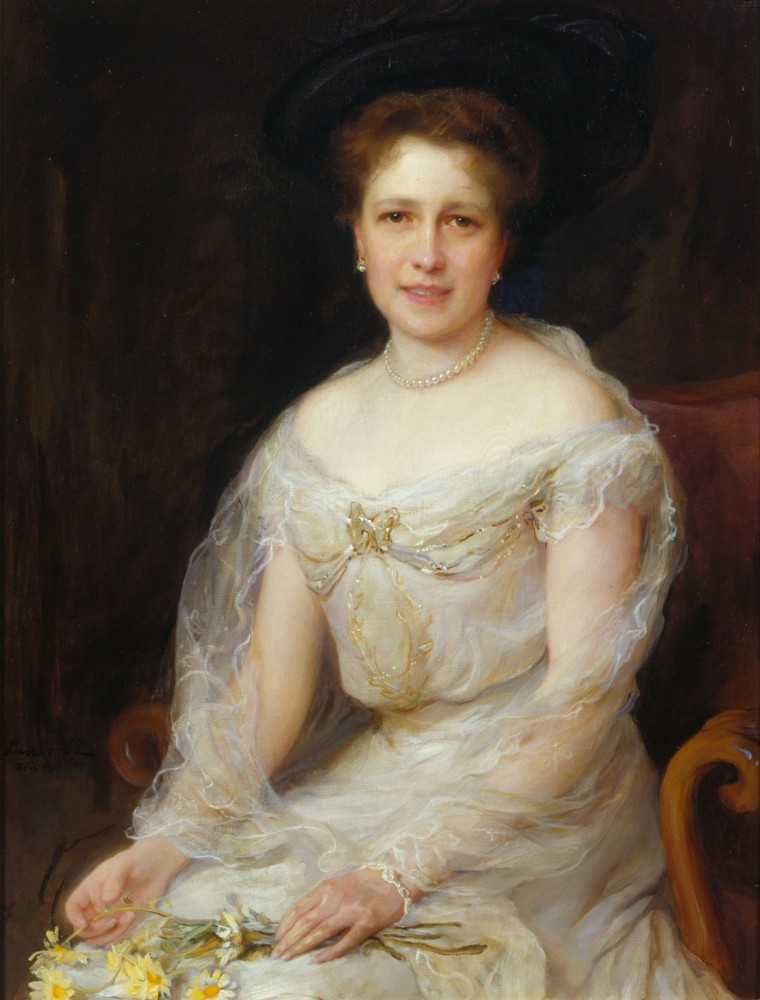
Portrait of Archduchess Maria Christina, by Philip de László, 1902

Maria Christina was the eldest child and daughter of Archduke Friedrich, Duke of Teschen and his wife Princess Isabella of Croÿ.

Her paternal grandparents were Karl Ferdinand, Archduke of Austria and Archduchess Elisabeth Franziska of Austria (a daughter of Archduke Joseph, Palatine of Hungary). Her maternal grandparents were Rudolf, 11th Duke of Croÿ, and Princess Natalie of Ligne (a daughter of Eugène, 8th Prince of Ligne).

== Personal life ==
Maria Christina married Emanuel, Hereditary Prince of Salm-Salm, son of Alfred, 7th Prince of Salm-Salm and his wife Countess Rosa of Lützow, on 10 May 1902 in Vienna. Maria Christina and Emanuel had five children:

- Princess Isabelle of Salm-Salm (1903–2009), who married Count Felix von Loë of Wissen Castle.
- Princess Rosemary of Salm-Salm (1904–2001), who married Archduke Hubert Salvator of Austria (1894–1971)
- Nikolaus Leopold, 8th Prince of Salm-Salm (1906–1988), who married Princess Ida of Wrede. They divorced in 1948 and he married Eleonore von Zitzewitz. They divorced in 1961 and he married Maria Moret. He later married Christiane Kostecki.
- Princess Cäcilie of Salm-Salm (1911–1991), who married Franz, 6th Prince of Salm-Reifferscheidt-Krautheim, eldest son of Alfred, 5th Prince of Salm-Reifferscheidt-Krautheim.
- Prince Franz of Salm-Salm (1912–1917), who died young.

Archduchess Maria Christina died on 6 August 1962 at Anholt, West Germany.

== Ancestry ==
Ancestors of Archduchess Maria Christina of Austria (1879–1962)

8. Archduke Charles, Duke of Teschen
4. Archduke Karl Ferdinand of Austria
9. Princess Henrietta of Nassau-Weilburg
2. Archduke Friedrich, Duke of Teschen
10. Archduke Joseph, Palatine of Hungary
5. Archduchess Elisabeth Franziska of Austria
11. Duchess Maria Dorothea of Württemberg
1. Archduchess Maria Christina of Austria
12. Alfred, 10th Duke of Croÿ
6. Rudolf, 11th Duke of Croÿ
13. Princess Eleonore of Salm-Salm
3. Princess Isabella of Croÿ
14. Eugène, 8th Prince of Ligne
7. Princess Natalie of Ligne
15. Nathalie de Trazegnies
