= Naval Cemetery Pula =

Entrance gate

The Naval Cemetery (German: k.u.k. Marinefriedhof Pula) is a cemetery at Pula, Croatia.

== History ==
The cemetery was erected by the Naval section of the Austro-Hungarian War Ministry in 1862. While it only covered 4000 square meters in the beginning, it was expanded to a size of 22.000 square meters over the years.

Today, over 150.000 soldiers are buried there. The areal was renovated in 1990 with the help of the Austrian Black Cross and the German War Graves Commission.

== Burials ==
See Category:Burials at the Naval Cemetery Pula

- Anton Bourguignon von Baumberg
- Anton Haus
- Nazario Sauro
- Janko Vuković
- Anton von Wiplinger
