= Anton von Wiplinger =

Anton von Wiplinger

Anton von Wiplinger (*December 14, 1830, Graz; +March 3, 1896, Pula) was an Austro-Hungarian vice admiral.

== Biography ==
Von Wiplinger joined the Austrian Army at the age of 13. He joined the Navy in 1847. Since 1853, he has been teaching at the Imperial and Royal Naval Academy. During his career, he travelled to the Caribbean, the Middle East and England. From 1863 to 1864 as well as from 1866 to 1868, he served as Head of the Central Office of the Naval Section of the Austro-Hungarian War Ministry. From 1868 to 1871, he joined an expedition to both America and the Middle East. Later on, he served in Pula and Trieste. Together with the German company "Krupp", he oversaw the renewal of Naval artillery. He retired in 1891. He died in Pula and was buried at the Naval Cemetery Pula.

== Orders, Decorations and Medals (Selected) ==
- Order of Leopold (Austria), Knight Commander
- Military Merit Medal (Austria-Hungary)
- War Medal 1873
- Order of the Iron Crown (Austria), II. Class and War Decoration
- Royal Order of Kamehameha I
- Order of the Crown of Thailand
- Order of the Crown (Prussia)
