= Fort Bourguignon =

Fort in Pula, Croatia

- Part of Pula's military structure ring
- Monsival, Pula
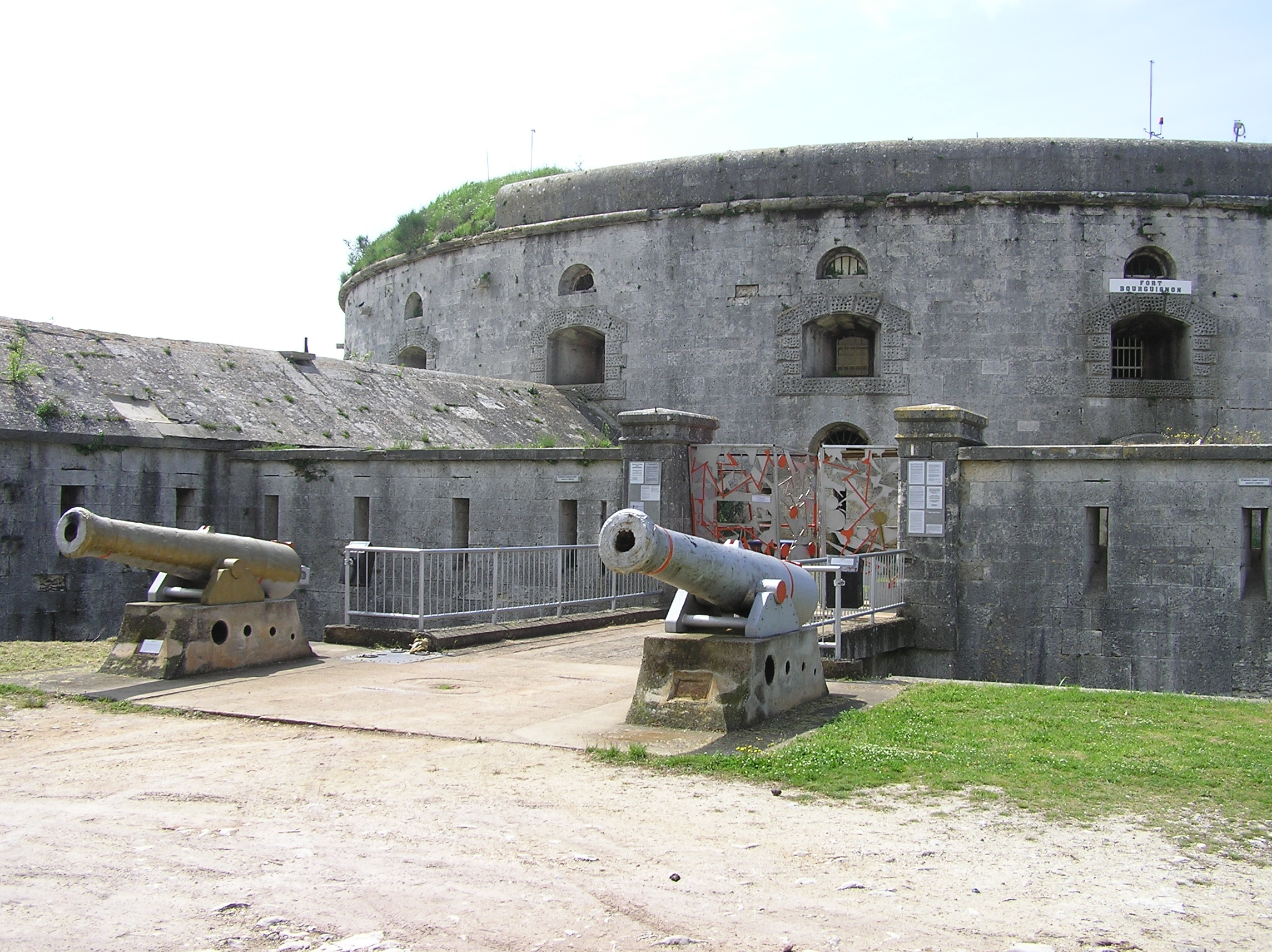
- Fort Bourguignon

Site information
- Type: military structure
- Open to the public: no
- Condition: preserved

Location
- Coordinates: 44°50′49″N 13°50′01″E

Site history
- Built: 1861-66
- Built by: Austrian Empire
- In use: 1866-?
- Materials: concrete and steel
- Battles/wars: Third Italian War of Independence

Fort Bourguignon (Fort Monsival) is one of many fortresses in Pula, Croatia that were built by the Austrian Empire in the second half of the 19th century.

== Design ==
The chief reason for building the fortress was to protect the Pula harbour, the main Austrian naval port. It was one of the last fortresses built that used inner fortification rings, forming an arc within a radius of 2.5 kilometres (1.6 miles) distance to protect the port. It was named after the Austrian admiral Anton Bourguignon von Baumberg. The fortress was inspired by the 1820 fortress design of Archduke Maximilian of Austria-Este for protecting Linz, Austria. Pula's fortresses differ from the original Linz fortress in that older fortresses built between the years 1851-1855 are smaller and less well-fortified than the ones built ten years later, like Fort Bourguignon.

== History ==
Originally called Fort Monsival, it was built from 1861 to 1866, as a two-story circled fortress with a small circular courtyard in the center.

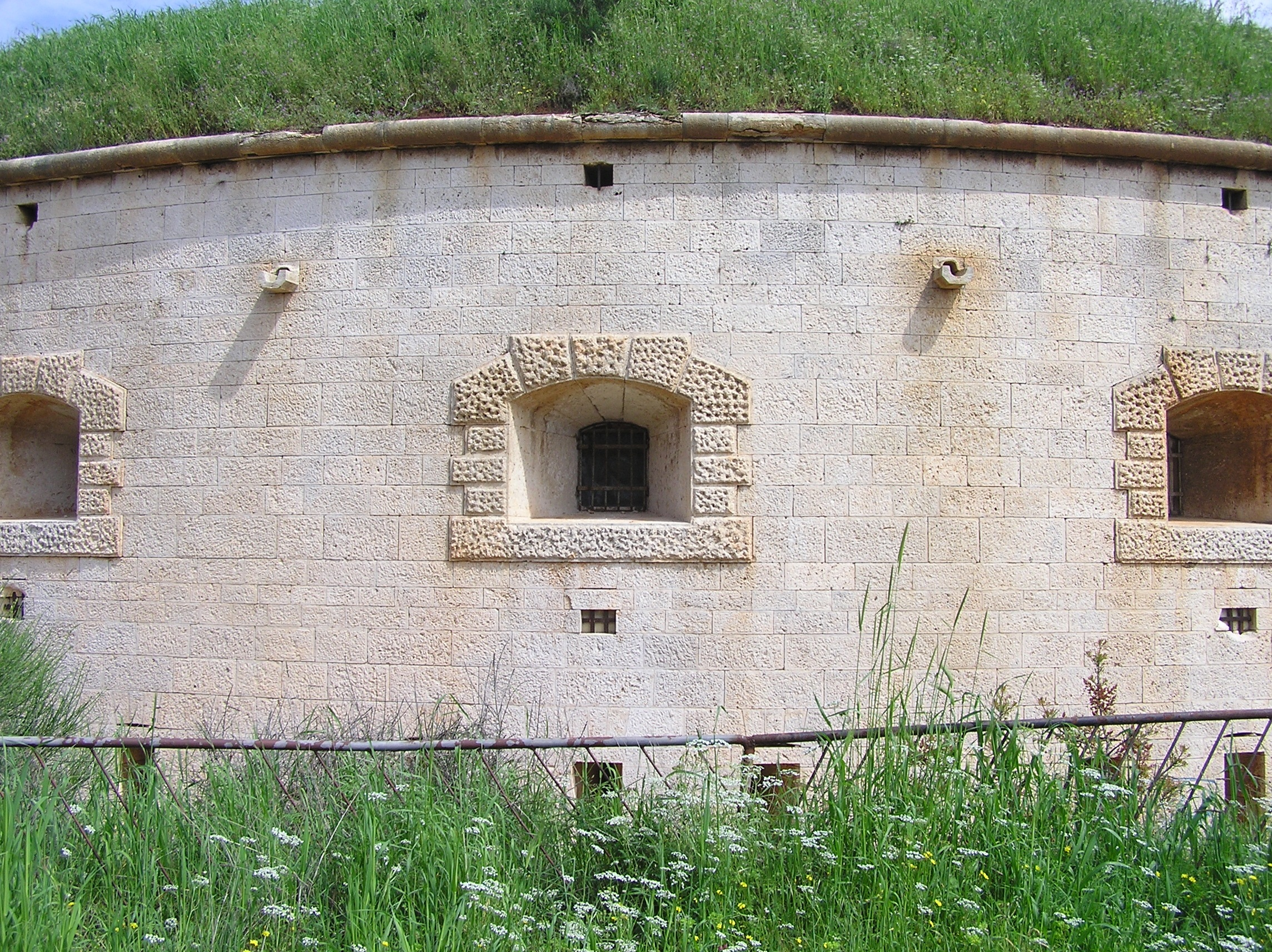
Fort Bourguignon

It is not known when the fortress stopped being used as a fortification, but it was used during Third Italian War of Independence in 1866. Soon afterward, it was considered non-operational, but the damage on the roof shows that it was used during the First World War as an army shelter. In the 1970s, the protective channel was half filled with trash. Ten years later a group of young activists turned the fort into one of the two most popular places for rave parties on the southern Adriatic coast.

== Design ==
The hallway faces the yard and expands through every floor, while 20 casemates form the outer shell of the fortress. The fort has three embrasures on the lower floor for rifles, and one embrasure on the upper floor for a cannon. The ceiling is supported by massive oak beams, which once divided the two floors in each casemate. Only a few remain.

The roof of the fortress, which was able to rotate 360 degrees, served as a moving platform for artillery. The iron roof was probably constructed around the end of the 19th century.

The entrance into the Fort was protected by the drawbridge over a moat and two caponiers. A wall offers a gallery and embrasures for the rifles. The standard armament of Pula's fortresses, and probably also in Fort Bourguignon, was 305 mm (12 in) weapons, the most famous Austrian cannon during the First World War.

== See also ==
- Pula
