= Metternich (name) =

Metternich usually refers to Prince Klemens von Metternich (1773–1859), famous Austrian politician and diplomat.

It may also refer to any of several members of the House of Metternich.

- Tatiana von Metternich-Winneburg (1915–2006)

The surname is also shared by:

- Count Franz von Metternich (1746–1818), diplomat and father of Prince Klemens, first Prince of Ochsenhausen
- Germain Metternich (1811–1862), supported the revolutions of 1848 in Germany, joined the Union Army and was killed in 1862 by a drunken soldier
- Josef Metternich (1915–2005), German singer
- Lothar von Metternich (1551–1623), Archbishop-Elector of Trier and Prince-Abbot of prüm (1599–1623)
- Lothar Friedrich von Metternich-Burscheid (1617–1675), Prince-Bishop of Speyer (1652–1675), and Worms (1673–1675), as well as Archbishop-Elector of Mainz (1673–1675)
- Princess Pauline von Metternich (1836–1921), niece of Klemens and wife of Richard von Metternich
- Paul Wolff Metternich (1853–1934), German diplomat, ambassador to the British (1903–12) and Ottoman (1915–16) Empires
- Prince Richard von Metternich (1829–1895), diplomat, son of Prince Klemens von Metternich
- Count Franz von Wolff-Metternich (1893–1978) art historian, 1940–1942 chief of the Kunstschutz Service of the German Wehrmacht.
