= Alfter Castle =

Castle in Alfter, Germany

- Schloss Alfter (German)
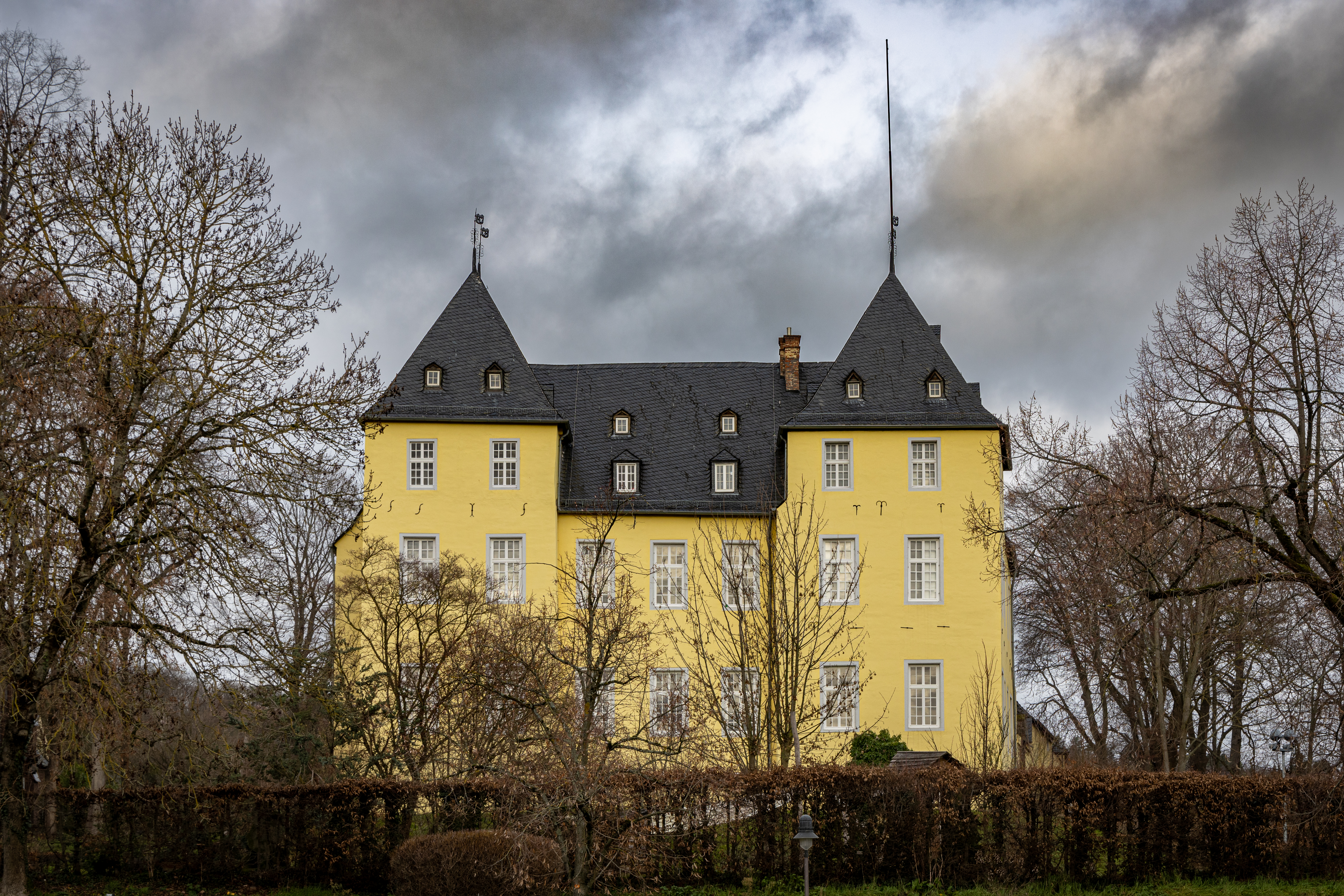
- The castle in 2022
- Interactive map of Alfter Castle
- 50.7389°N 7.0078°E
- Location: Schlossweg 1, 53347; Alfter, Germany

History
- Built: 1721

Alfter Castle (German: Schloss Alfter) is a castle in Alfter, Germany.

== History ==
The origins of the castle date back to the early 12th century. The castle is associated with the hereditary office of Marshall of the Electorate of Cologne.

In 1435, the ownership passed through marriage to Wilhelm von Wevelinghoven and in 1445 it became the propertt of the comital and princely Salm family. The original castle was destroyed by a fire in 1468. The present castle was built in 1721 for Count Franz Wilhelm von Salm-Reifferscheid.

In 1973, it housed the Alanus University of Arts and Social Sciences.

The castle was restored in 2015.

In 2022, the local government wanted to use the castle to house Ukrainian refugees.
