= Salm-Reifferscheid-Krautheim =

County (Principality) of Salm-Reifferscheid-Krautheim Grafschaft (Fürstentum) Salm-Reifferscheid-Krautheim
- 1803–1806
- Coat of arms
- Status: Imperial Estate
- Capital: Krautheim
- Government: Principality
- Count (1803–04)
- Prince (1804–06)
- Historical era: Napoleonic Wars
  - Compensation for Salm-Reifferscheid-Bedburg: 1803
  - Raised to principality: 1804
  - Mediatised to Baden and Wurttemberg: 1806
Preceded by	Succeeded by
Salm-Reifferscheid-Bedburg	Grand Duchy of Baden; Kingdom of Wurttemberg

Salm-Reifferscheid-Krautheim was a short-lived Imperial Estate to the Holy Roman Empire, which was created as a succession of Salm-Reifferscheid-Bedburg in 1803. It was raised to a Principality in 1804, and was mediatised to the Kingdom of Wurttemberg and the Grand Duchy of Baden in 1806.

== History ==
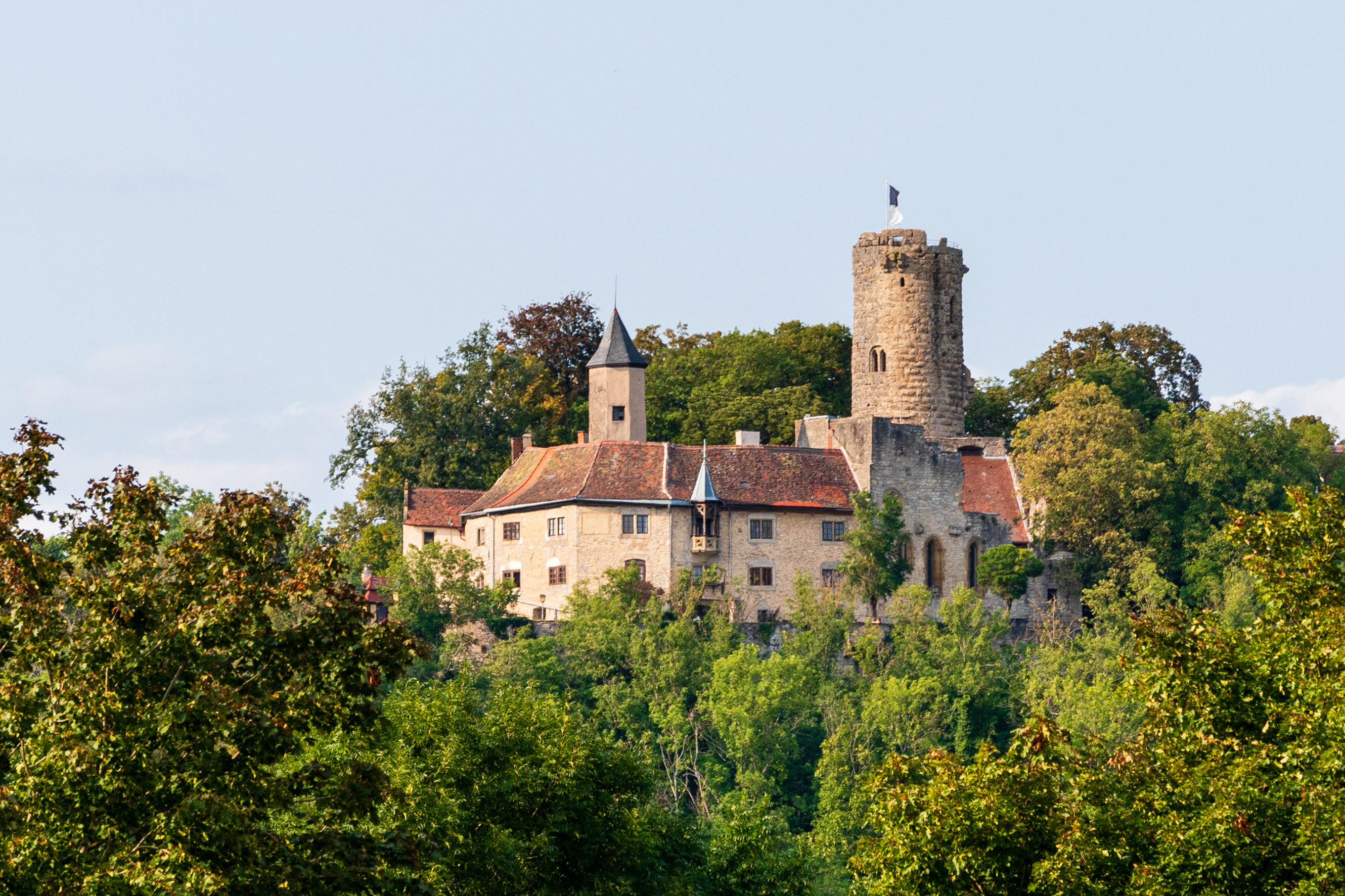
Krautheim Castle

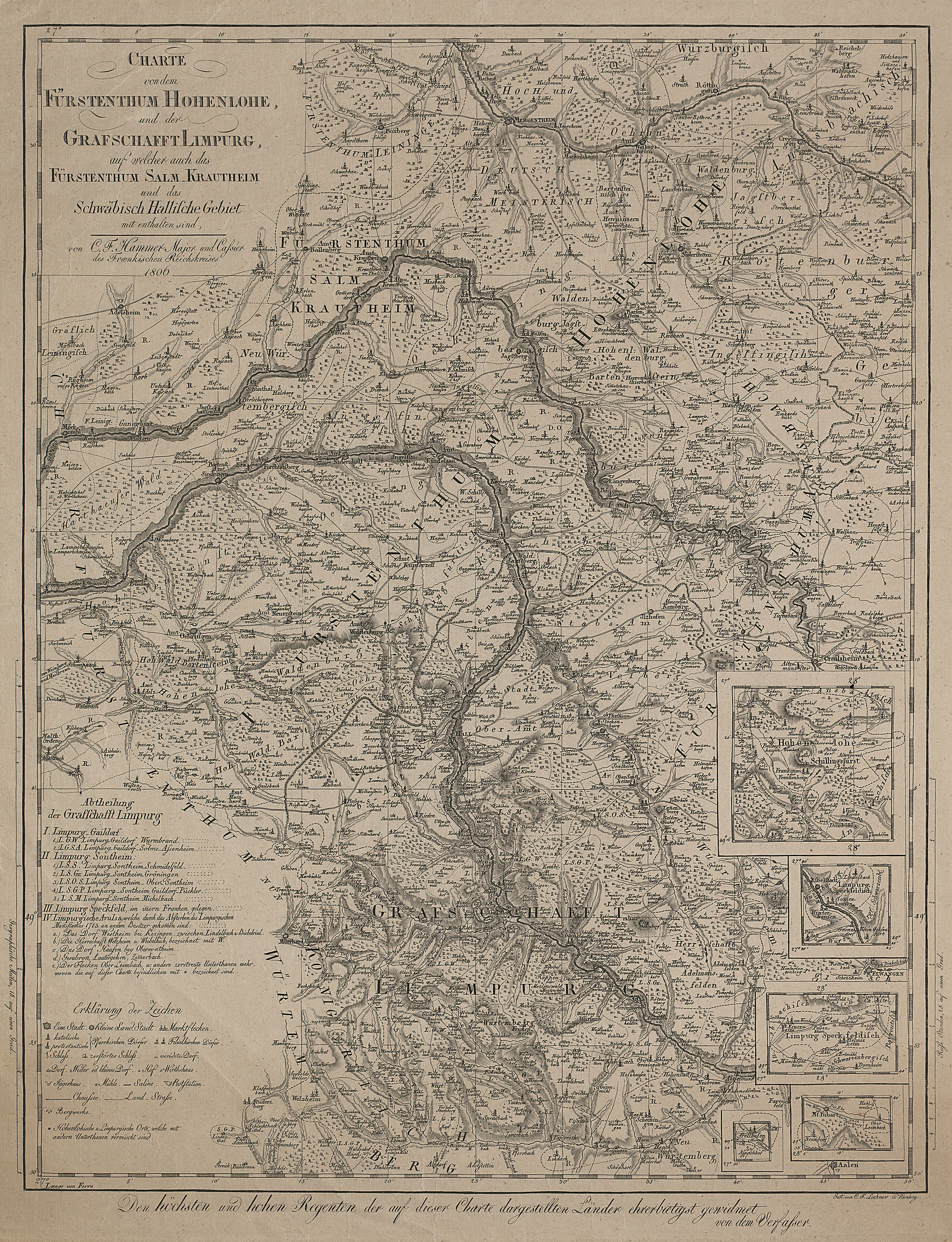
Map of the Principality of Krautheim, 1806

The statelet was created on 25 February 1803 as one of the results of the Reichsdeputationshauptschluss (Imperial Recess of 1803), in which the House of Salm-Reifferscheidt-Bedburg was compensated for the loss of its areas on the left bank of the Rhine by becoming a principality formed from Mainz and Würzburg possessions. The territory of the new principality included the former possessions of Schöntal Abbey, Krautheim, the Gerlachsheim monastery and the Oberamt Grünsfeld of Würzburg. The ruling prince was Franz, 1st Prince of Salm-Reifferscheidt-Krautheim.

The principality was mediatised after only three years on 12 July 1806 in Article 24 of the Rhine Confederation Act, and the territory north of the Jagst given to the Grand Duchy of Baden, and to the south of the Jagst to the Kingdom of Württemberg.

His son, Konstantine, succeeded him in 1831, but sold his lordly privileges to the Grand Duchy of Baden in 1839. His son, Leopold, the 4th Prince, inherited Schloss Dyck from Alfred, 2nd Prince of Salm-Reifferscheidt-Dyck in 1888. Upon the death of Franz, 6th Prince and Count of Salm-Reifferscheidt-Krautheim und Dyck, the male line of the Princes of Salm-Reifferscheidt-Dyck of the Salm-Reifferscheidt family became extinct.

== Counts of Salm-Reifferscheidt-Krautheim (1803–1804) ==
- Franz Wilhelm, 1st Count, elevated to Reichsfürst 1804

== Princes of Salm-Reifferscheidt-Krautheim (1804–1806) ==
- Franz Wilhelm, 1st Prince, mediatized 1806 (1772–1831)
  - Konstantin, 2nd Prince (1798–1856)
    - Franz, 3rd Prince (1827–1860)
    - Leopold, 4th Prince (1833–1893)
      - Alfred, 5th Prince (1863–1924)
        - Franz, 6th Prince (1899–1958)

== See also ==
- Krautheim Castle
- Schloss Dyck
