= Franz von Hartig =

Austrian politician (1789–1865)

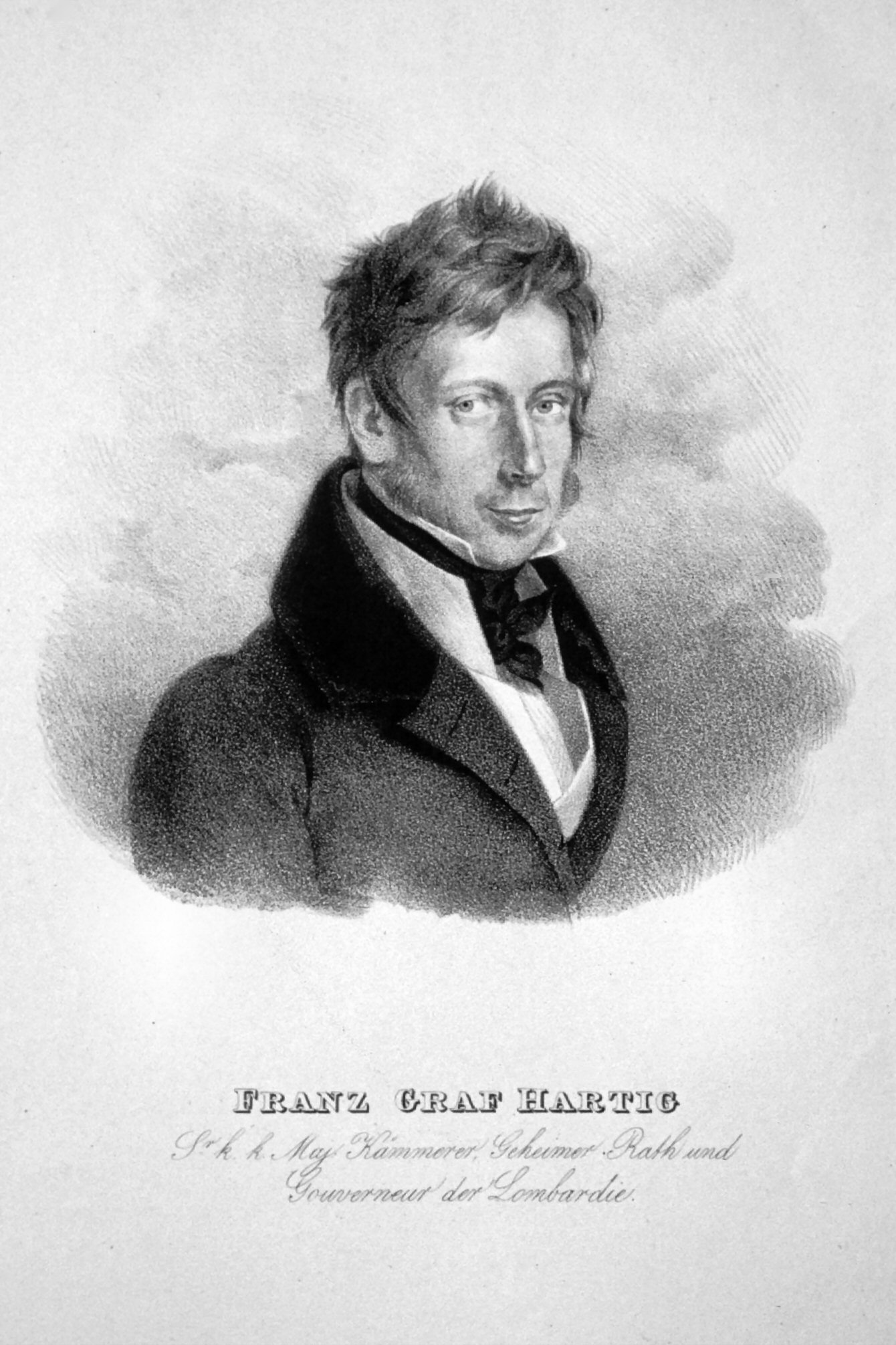

Franz von Hartig (1789 – 1865) was an Austrian statesman.

== Biography ==
He held a number of important government posts until the appearance of his book Genesis der Revolution in Oesterreich (“Origins of the Revolution in Austria,” 3rd edition, 1851), describing the beginning of the liberal movement in Austria, forced him into retirement. In 1860, he was elected to the Reichsrat, where he played a prominent part as a member of the Liberal Centralist Party. In 1861, he was called to the Austrian House of Lords (German: Herrenhaus), of which he remained a member until his death.

== See also ==
- List of honorary citizens of Vienna
- List of knights of the Golden Fleece
