= Anton Bourguignon von Baumberg =

Austro-Hungarian Admiral (1808–1879)

- Born: 8 June 1808; Heřmanův Městec, Austrian Empire
- Died: 28 May 1879 (aged 70); Pula, Austria-Hungary
- Resting place: Pula, Croatia
- Occupation: Admiral
- Years active: 1825 - 1879
- Employer: Austrian Navy

Anton Bourguignon von Baumberg (8 June 1808 in Heřmanův Městec, Austrian Empire – 28 May 1879 in Pula, Austro-Hungarian Empire) was an Austro-Hungarian admiral.

== Biography ==
Bourguignon von Baumberg started his career in the navy in 1825, and, in 1857, he was ranked as a commander. He remained at this rank until the year 1859. In 1864, he was ranked as first admiral of Pula, where he stayed until his death. Two years after his admiral ranking, he was assigned as the main guardian of Pula's military structures. He was in charge of organizing Pula's arsenal, which helped to strengthen the Austrian Empire naval fleet before the Third Italian War of Independence in 1866. At that time, the Italian fleet had been defeated. Emperor Franz Joseph I of Austria promoted him from the highest-ranking Austrian lieutenant to admiral in 1875. He is buried at the Naval Cemetery Pula.

Fort Monsival, a fort in Pula, was renamed Fort Bourguignon in 1869 in his honor.
