= Schloss Dyck =

Castle in Jüchen, Germany

Coordinates: 51.141883°N 6.557306°E

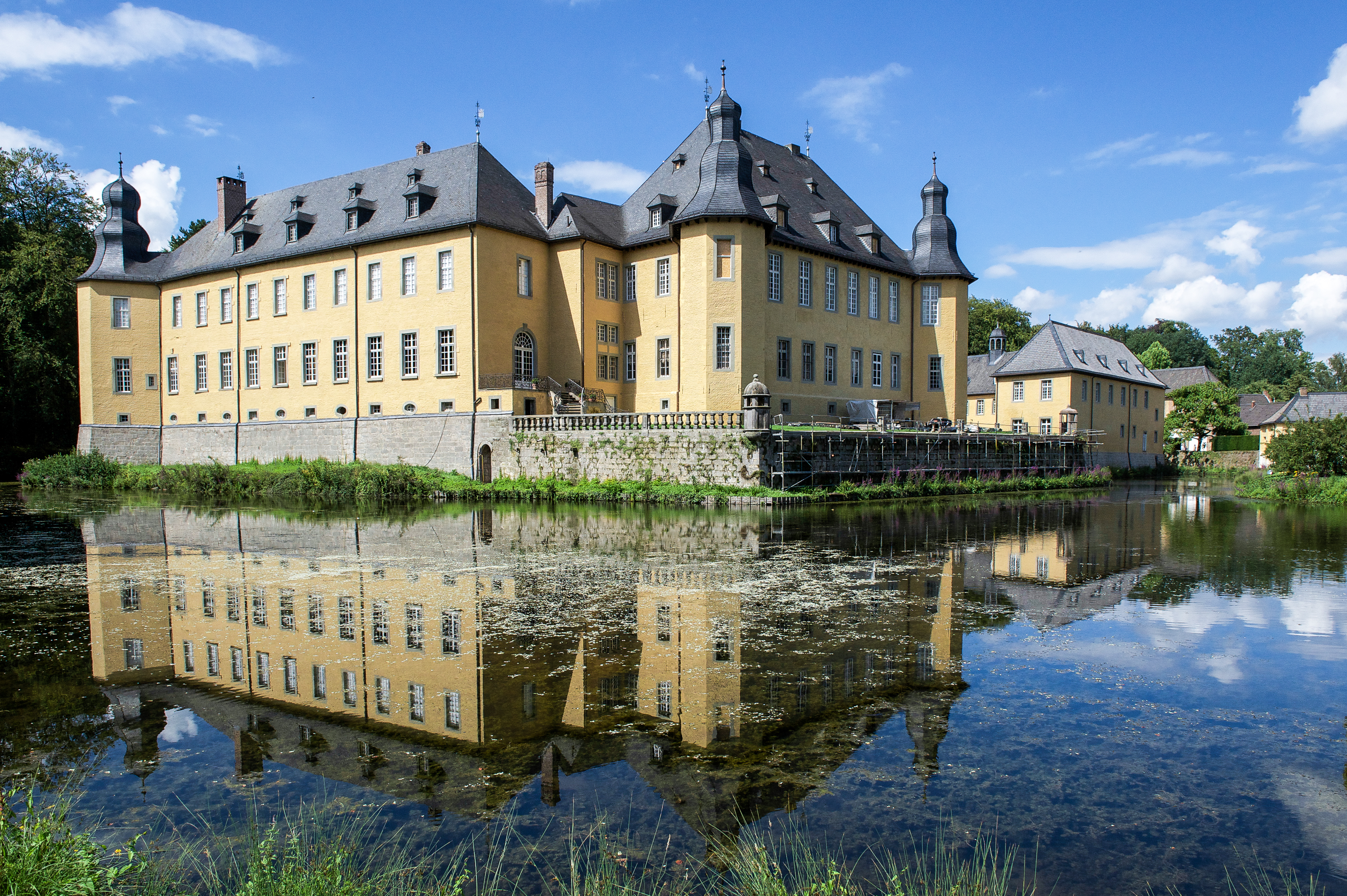
Schloss Dyck in 2011

Castle Dyck (German: Schloss Dyck) is a moated castle in the Rhineland region of Germany. It is located in the municipality of Jüchen in Rhein-Kreis Neuss, North Rhine-Westphalia, between Grevenbroich and Mönchengladbach.

== History ==
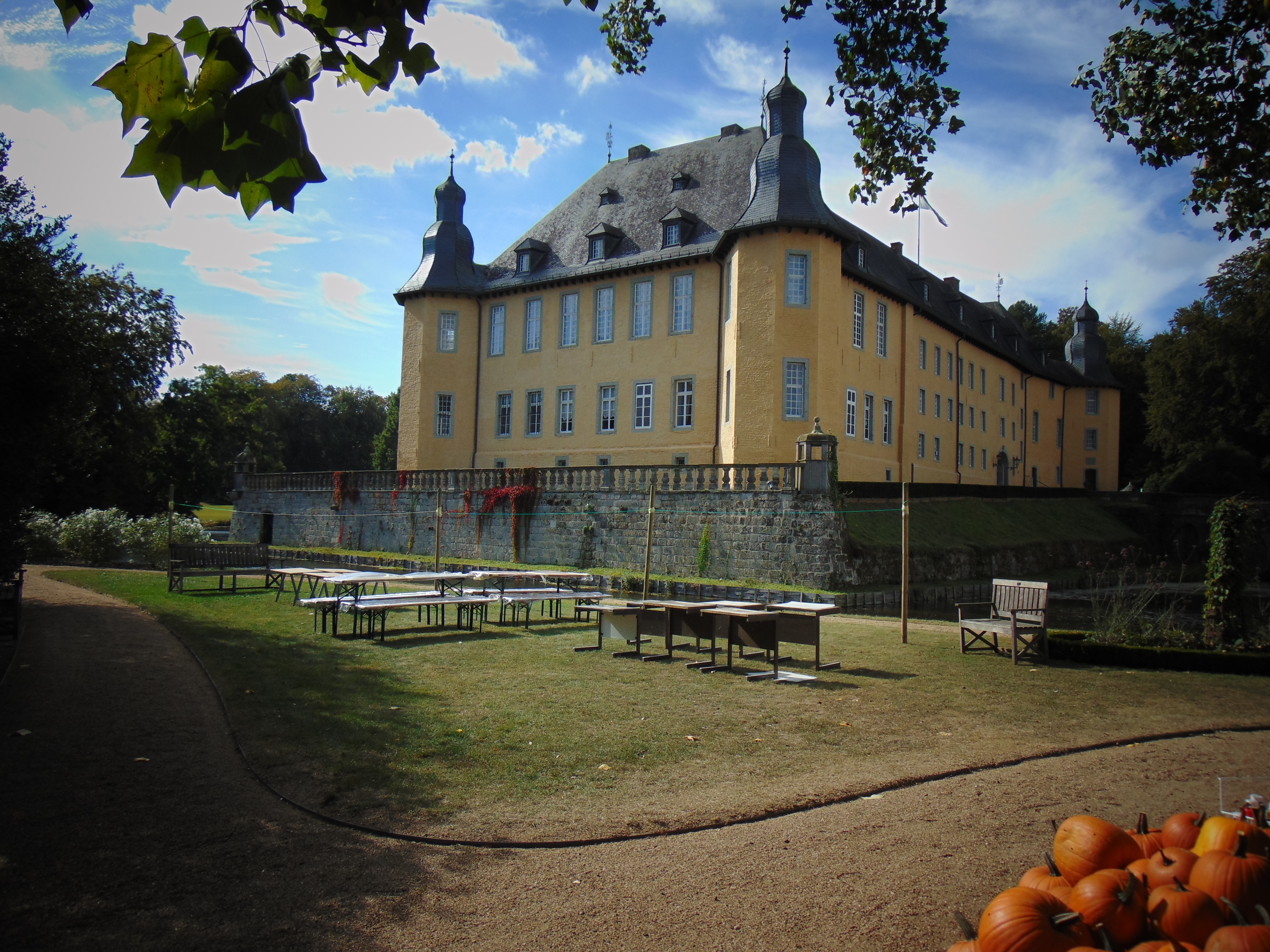
Schloss Dyck

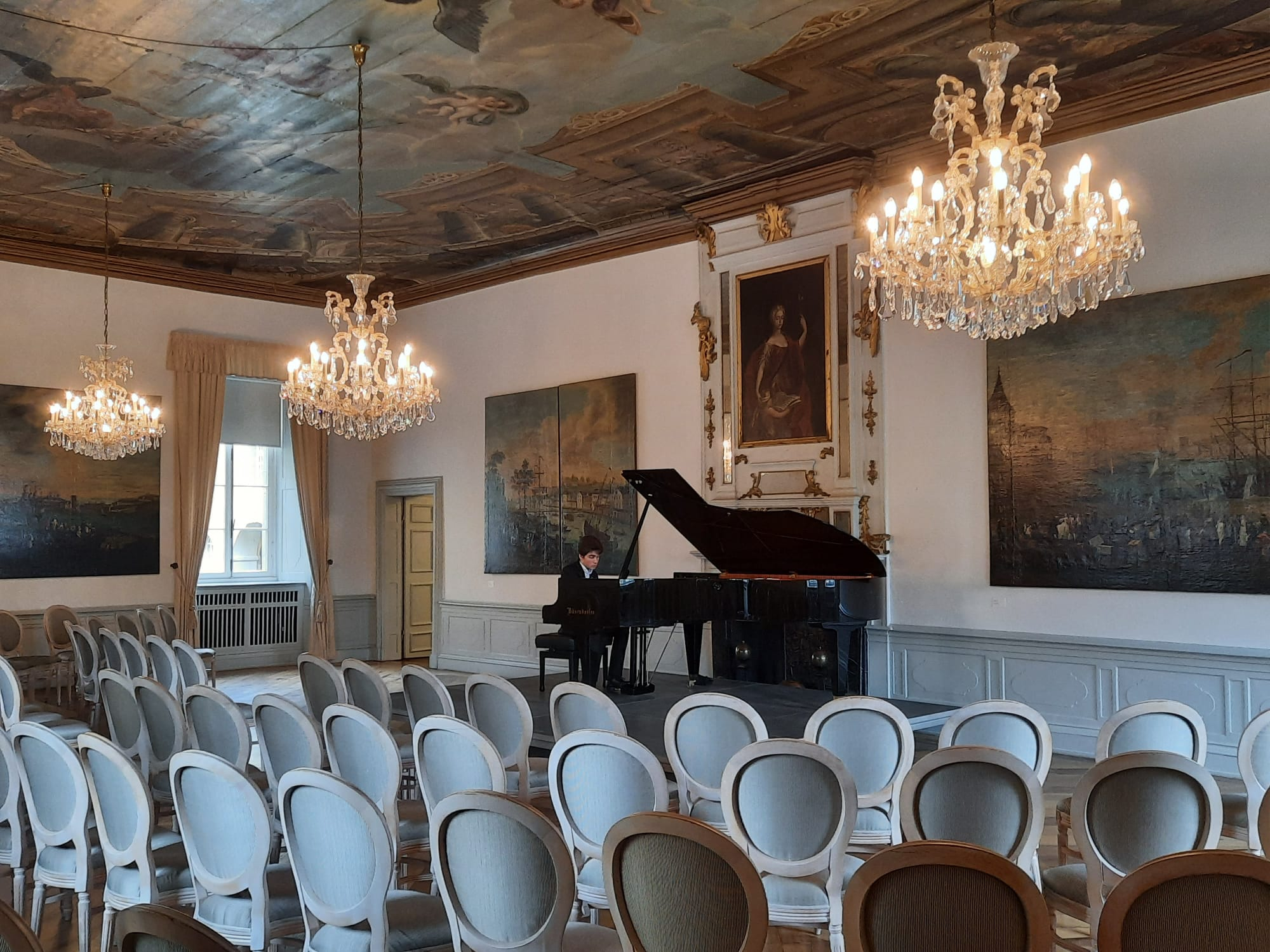
Historical banquet hall with grand piano

The history of the castle began in 1094 when the knight Hermannus de Disco was mentioned in a record of the Archbishop of Cologne as the lord of a simple fortification. Over time the site was converted into a fortified moated castle. In 1383 the castle was besieged by the cities of Aachen and Cologne, as well as by the archbishop Friedrich III von Saarwerden and Duke William I of Guelders and Jülich. They accused Lord Gerard van Dyck of being a robber knight. When Gerard van Dyck died without male offspring, the castle was inherited by Johann V von Reifferscheidt, the ancestor of the counts and princes of Salm-Reifferscheid. This family owned the castle for more than 900 years until it became the Centre for Garden Art and Landscape Design in 1999. The last heiress of the family, Countess Marie Christine Wolff Metternich, turned it over to a foundation to secure the future of the castle.

The castle is the center of Salm-Reifferscheid-Dyck, a former independent territory located between the Electorate of Cologne, Guelders and Jülich. The small territory was called "Dycker Ländchen" and is still recognizable for its unique cultural landscape.

== Description ==
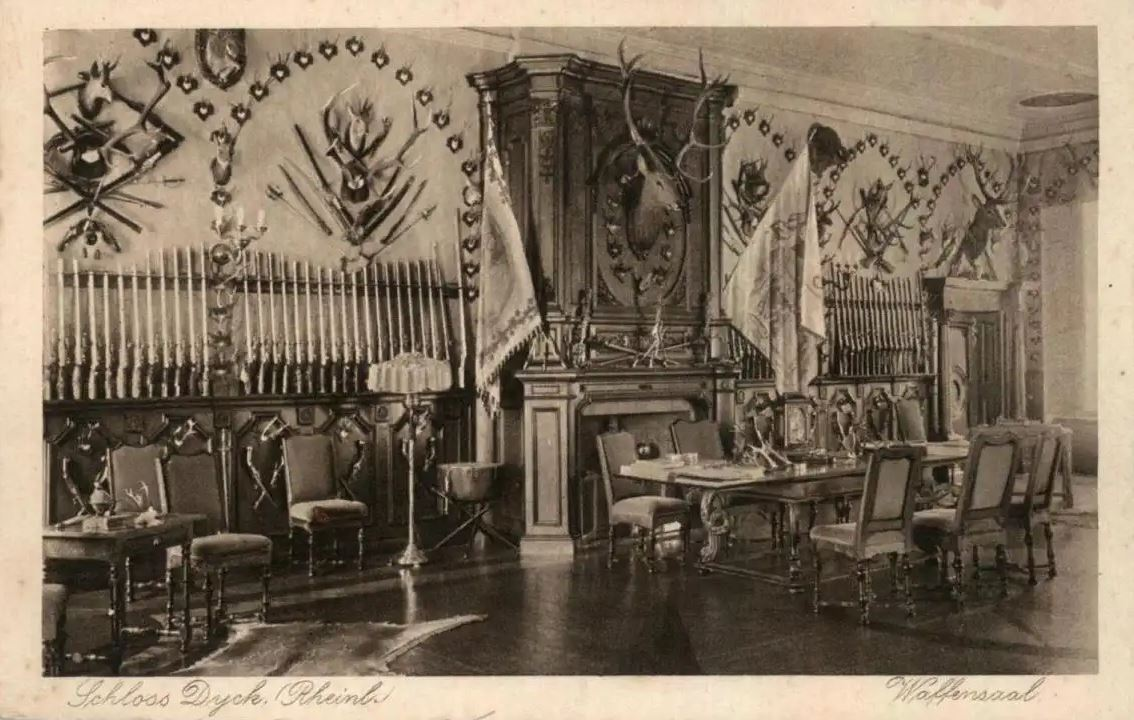
The armoury at Schloss Dyck

The main building, the forecourts, and the outbuilding and the stables are spread over four islands. In the 17th century the castle was turned into an early baroque residence. Count Salentin of Salm-Reifferscheid extended the main building into a four-wing complex; stables, watch rooms, and the brewery were renewed. In the 18th century, Schloss Dyck became a Rococo residence, with fine tapestries and exquisite furniture. Unfortunately not everything has been saved: the famous library was sold at an auction in 1992, as was the armoury and weapons collection.

The complex is surrounded by an English landscape garden created by prince Joseph zu Salm-Reifferscheidt-Dyck. The castle and the park are open for visitors. The complex also includes a hotel that hosts many venues and meetings. Schloss Dyck Classic Days is a cultural heritage festival started in 2006. Its proceeds are used for the maintenance of the castle.

== Bibliography ==
- Jakob Bremer: Die reichsunmittelbare Herrschaft Dyck der Grafen jetzigen Fürsten zu Salm-Reifferscheidt. 1959.
- Ludger Fischer: Die schönsten Schlösser und Burgen am Niederrhein. Gudensberg-Gleichen 2004, ISBN 3-8313-1326-1
- Rita Hombach: Landschaftsgärten im Rheinland. Die Erfassung des historischen Bestands und Studien zur Gartenkultur des »langen« 19. Jahrhunderts = Beiträge zu den Bau- und Kunstdenkmälern im Rheinland 37. Wernersche Verlagsgesellschaft, Worms 2010. ISBN 978-3-88462-298-8, S. 103–113.
- Klaus-Henning von Krosigk: Anmerkungen zum Pleasureground im Schloßpark von Dyck. In: Die Gartenkunst 19 (2/2007), S. 374–380.
- Frank Maier-Solgk (Text), Sonja Geurts (Red.), Stiftung Schloss Dyck (Hrsg.): Schloss Dyck. Historischer Park und neue Gärten, Jüchen: Stiftung Schloss Dyck, 2002, ISBN 3-9808216-1-7
- Margit Sachse: Als in Dyck Kakteen blühten ...: Leben und Werk des Dycker Schlossherren Joseph Altgraf und Fürst zu Salm-Reifferscheid-Dyck (1773–1861), Pulheim: Rhein-Eifel-Mosel Verlag, 2005, ISBN 3-924182-64-7
