= Hugo, 3rd Prince of Salm-Reifferscheidt-Raitz =

Hugo II
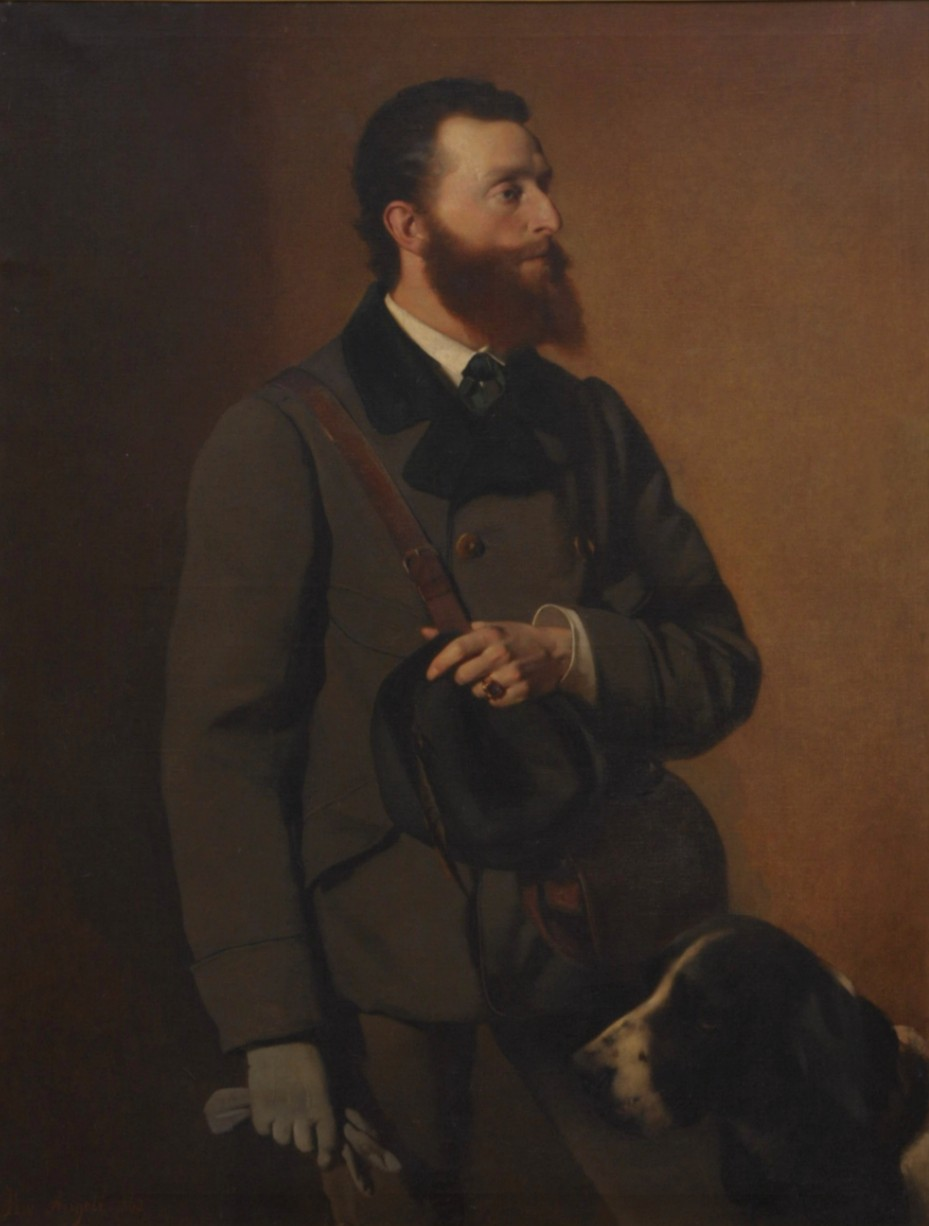
- Portrait of Prince Hugo, by Heinrich von Angeli, c. 1885

Prince of Salm-Reifferscheidt-Raitz
- Reign: 1839–1888
- Predecessor: Hugo I
- Successor: Hugo III
- Born: 9 November 1832; Prague, Kingdom of Bohemia
- Died: 12 May 1890 (aged 86); Vienna, Austria-Hungary
- Spouse: Princess Elisabeth of Liechtenstein (m. 1858; died 1890)
- Issue: Countess Maria Leopoldine; Hugo, 4th Prince of Salm-Reifferscheidt-Raitz; Countess Elisabeth; Count Karl Boromäus; Countess Eleonore
Names
- Hugo Karl Franz de Paula Theodor zu Salm-Reifferscheidt-Raitz
- House: Salm-Reifferscheidt-Raitz
- Father: Hugo, 2nd Prince of Salm-Reifferscheidt-Raitz
- Mother: Countess Leopoldine of Salm-Reifferscheidt-Krautheim

Hugo Karl Franz de Paula Theodor, 3rd Prince of Salm-Reifferscheidt-Raitz (9 November 1832 – 12 May 1890) was a mediatized German hereditary prince and politician.

== Early life ==
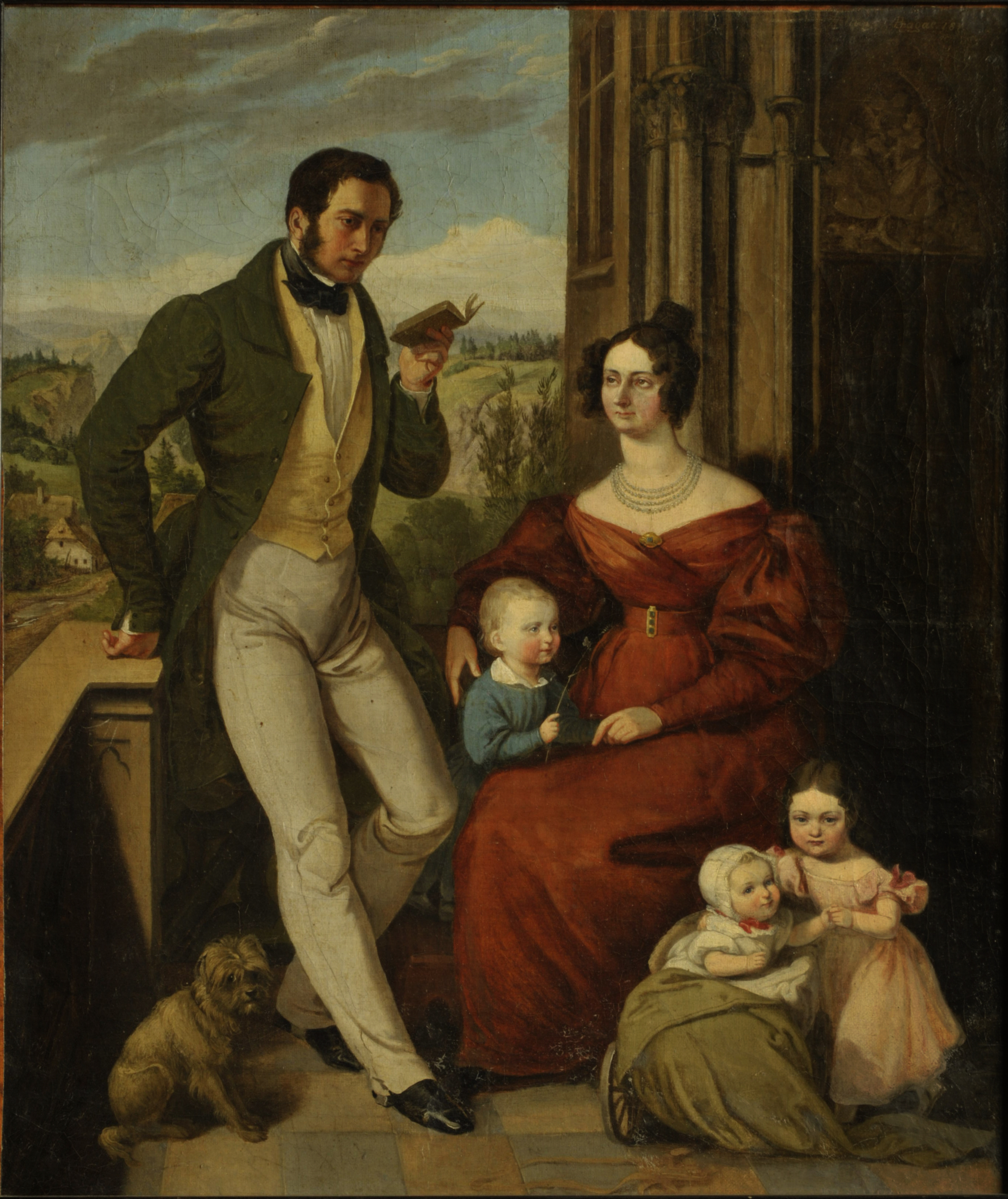
Portrait of a young Prince Hugo, his parents, and two of his sisters, by Josef Vojtěch Hellich

Hugo was born on 15 September 1803 in Prague in the Kingdom of Bohemia. He was the eldest son of Hugo, 2nd Prince of Salm-Reifferscheidt-Raitz and Countess Leopoldine Polyxene Christiane of Salm-Reifferscheidt-Krautheim (1805–1878). Among his siblings were Countess Augusta (who married Count Heinrich Jaroslaw Clam-Martinic); (Note: His brother-in-law, Count Heinrich Jaroslaw Clam-Martinic, was a son of Count Karl Johann Nepomuk of Clam-Martinic and the former Lady Selina Meade (a daughter of the 2nd Earl of Clanwilliam).) Count Siegfried (a member of the House of Deputies and Bohemian Diet who married Countess Rudolfine Czernin von und zu Chudenitz); and Count Erich (who married Donna Maria Alvarez de Toledo). (Note: His sister-in-law, Donna Maria Alvarez de Toledo, was a daughter of Don Ignacio Álvarez de Toledo Palafox (the youngest son of Francisco de Borja Álvarez de Toledo, 12th Marquis of Villafranca) and Teresa Álvarez de Toledo Silva-Bazán (the daughter of Don Ignacio Álvarez's elder brother, Pedro de Alcántara Álvarez de Toledo, 13th Marquess of Villafranca).)

His paternal grandparents were Count Franz Joseph of Salm-Reifferscheidt-Raitz (only son of Karl Joseph, 1st Prince of Salm-Reifferscheidt-Raitz and Princess Maria Franziska of Auersperg), and Countess Maria Josepha McCaffry von Keanmore. His maternal grandparents were Prince Franz Wilhelm of Salm-Reifferscheidt-Krautheim and Princess Franziska Luise of Hohenlohe-Bartenstein (sister of Louis Aloysius, Prince of Hohenlohe-Waldenburg-Bartenstein).

He spent his youth at the family estate, Raitz Castle, among other places. His family often resided in the Salm Palace in Vienna, a residence his father had acquired from the estate of Archduke Charles, Duke of Teschen in 1856.

== Career ==
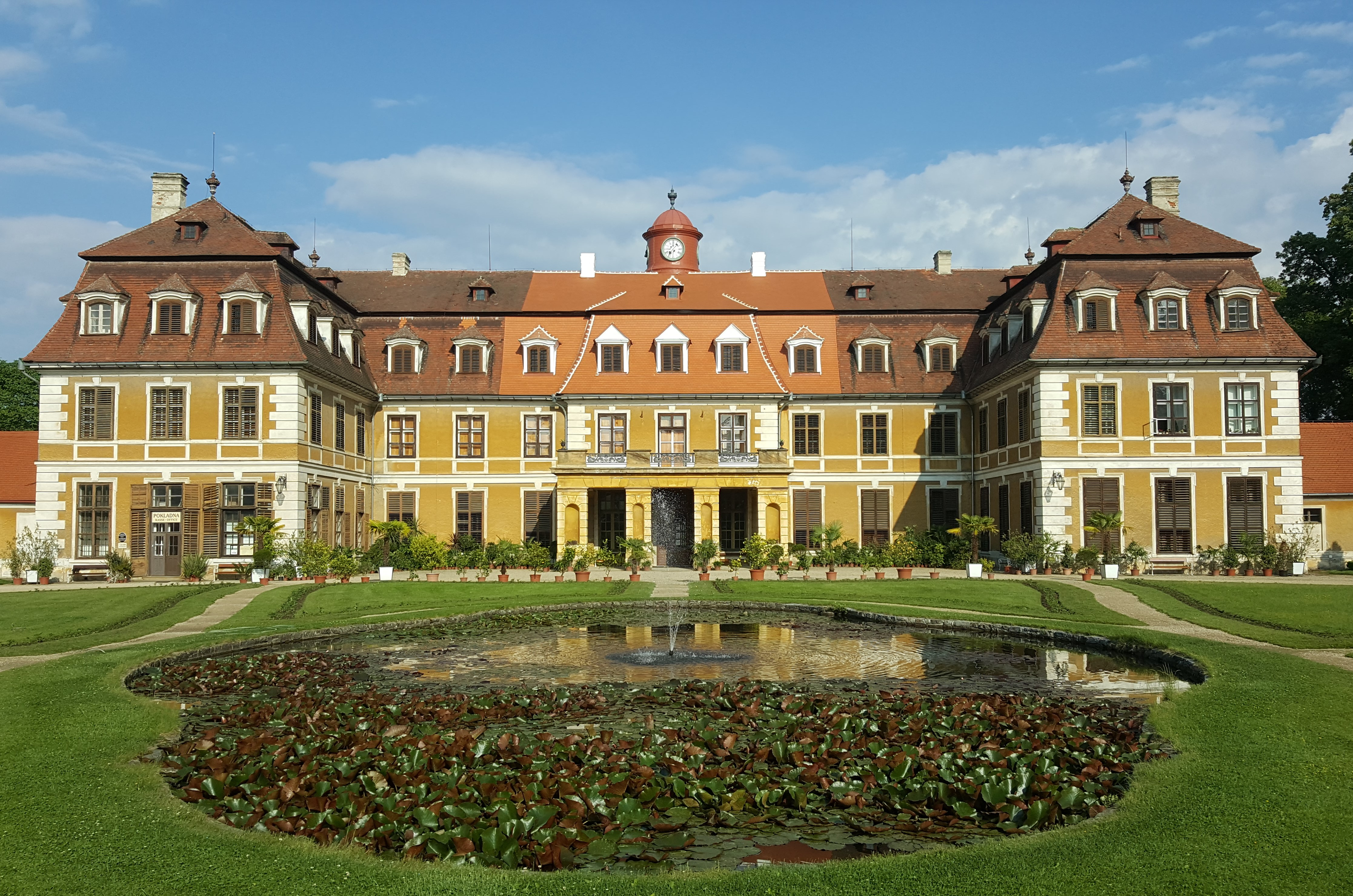
Raitz Castle

After studying law, he began been managing his family's estates in 1878 after his father had withdrawn from active ownership. The estates had lost their manorial status in 1848. With this decision-making authority, he contributed to the further development of the ironworks in Blansko, where cast iron was produced for construction and arts and crafts, such as iron for the construction of the spa colonnade in Marienbad. In 1883, over 30 percent of Moravian iron was produced in the "Prince Salm's Ironworks". He ran the "Prince Salm's Iron, Machine and Sugar Factories" from Vienna until 1890. In 1868, he became a concessionaire of the Northwest Railway. In 1860 he co-founded the insurance company Austrian Phoenix (German: Österreichischer Phoenix) in Vienna, where he served as president until his death in 1890.

From 1858 to 1859, he was president of the Imperial and Royal Geographical Society in Vienna (German: Österreichische Geographische Gesellschaft). In 1879 he was one of the founders of the Philanthropic Society in Vienna, which he chaired until 1890. From 1882 until his death he also chaired the Moravian-Silesian Society for the Promotion of Agriculture, Natural History and Regional Studies. From 1887 he was also president of the Industrial Club in Vienna. He was also chairman of the Natural Science Society in Brno. A patron of the arts, he was a friend of the writer Ferdinand von Saar.

=== Political career ===
He began his political career in 1878 as a member of the Moravian Diet. There, he belonged to the estate of landowners. He was able to defend his seat in the 1884 elections. As a landowner, he also became a member of the House of Deputies of the Imperial Council in 1879.

After the death of his father in 1888, he moved to the House of Lords in 1889 as head of the Raitz line of the formerly Imperial princely family Salm-Reifferscheidt in the extensive House of Salm as the titular 3rd Prince of Salm-Reifferscheidt-Raitz. (Note: The County of Salm-Reifferscheidt-Raitz came into existence in Central Moravia (now part of the Czech Republic) after a partition of Salm-Reifferscheidt-Bedburg line in 1734. It was elevated to princely status for his great-grandfather, Karl Joseph zu Salm-Reifferscheidt-Raitz, in 1790, although the territory was mediatized in 1811.)

== Personal life ==
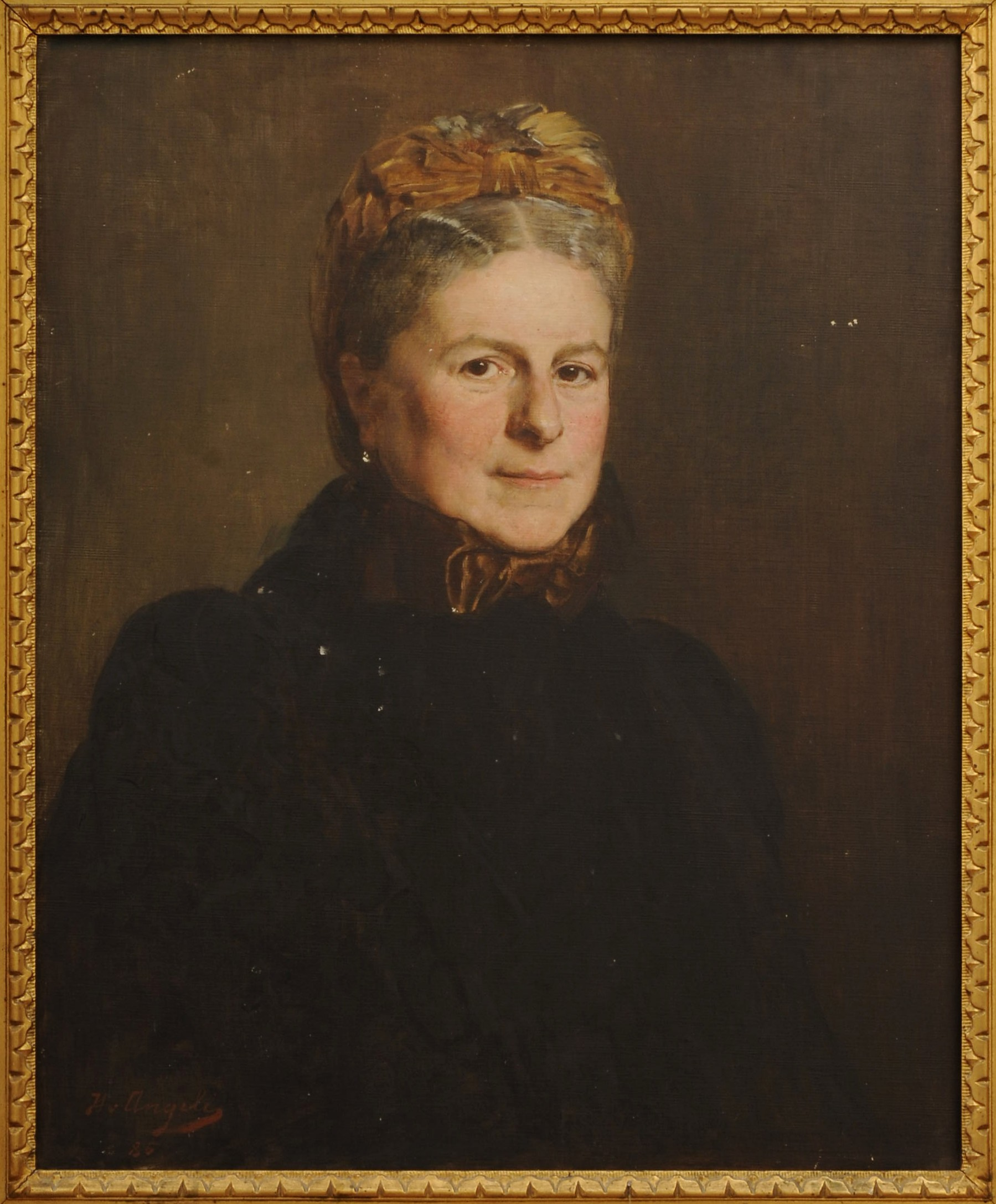
Portrait of his wife, Princess Elisabeth of Liechtenstein, by Heinrich von Angeli, 1885

In 1858, he married Princess Elisabeth of Liechtenstein (1832–1892), a daughter of Prince Karl Joseph of Liechtenstein and Countess Franziska von Würben und Freudenthal. (Note: Princess Elisabeth's family was a cadet branch of the reigning Princely House of Liechtenstein, the Moravský-Krumlov line, which was descended from Prince Karl Borromäus, the younger brother of Franz Joseph I, Prince of Liechtenstein.) Among her siblings were Prince Rudolf of Liechtenstein and Princess Maria Josefa of Liechtenstein, the first love of the deposed Mihailo Obrenović, Prince of Serbia. Together, they were the parents of:

- Countess Maria Leopoldine of Salm-Reifferscheidt-Raitz (1859–1897), who married Count Karol Lanckoroński, a son of Count Kazimierz Wincenty Michał Lanckoroński and Leonia Wanda Vitzthum, in 1878. They divorced in 1880 and she married Count Markus von Bombelles, a son of Count Markus Heinrich Wilhelm Bombelles and Countess Ferdinandina Draskovich von Traskostjan, in 1882.
- Hugo Leopold, 4th Prince of Salm-Reifferscheidt-Raitz (1863–1903), who married Countess Eleonore Marie Henriette Aloysia von Sternberg, a daughter of Count Leopold von Sternberg and Luise von Hohenlohe-Bartenstein, in 1891.
- Countess Elisabeth of Salm-Reifferscheidt-Raitz (1867–1888), who married Count Waldemar "Vladimír" Mittrowsky von Mittrowitz und Nemyšl, a son of Count Waldemar Mittrowsky and Countess Julie von Salis-Zizers, in 1885.
- Count Karl Boromäus of Salm-Reifferscheidt-Raitz (1871–1927), who inherited the Budkov estate near Třebíč from his uncle Prince Rudolf of Liechtenstein; he married Princess Elisabeth of Fürstenberg, a daughter of Prince Emil Egon of Fürstenberg (son of Charles Egon II, Prince of Fürstenberg) and Countess Leontine von Khevenhüller-Metsch (a daughter of Richard, 5th Prince of Khevenhüller-Metsch), in 1905.
- Countess Eleonore of Salm-Reifferscheidt-Raitz (1873–1966), who married Count Johann Albert von Herberstein, the son of Count Johann Sigmund von Herberstein and Countess Júlia Festetics de Tolna, in 1894.

Prince Hugo died in Vienna, Austria-Hungary, on 12 May 1890. His widow, the dowager Princess of Salm-Reifferscheidt-Raitz, also died in Vienna on 14 March 1892.

=== Descendants ===
Through his eldest son Hugo, he was a grandfather of Countess Elisabeth of Salm-Reifferscheidt-Raitz (who married Count Paul Draskovich von Traskostjan) and Hugo Nikolaus Leopold Siegfried Karl Joseph Maria, 5th Prince of Salm-Reifferscheidt-Raitz (who married Countess Leopoldine von Mensdorff-Pouilly, a daughter of Count Alfons von Mensdorff-Pouilly and Ida Paar).
