= Hugo, 2nd Prince of Salm-Reifferscheidt-Raitz =

Hugo I
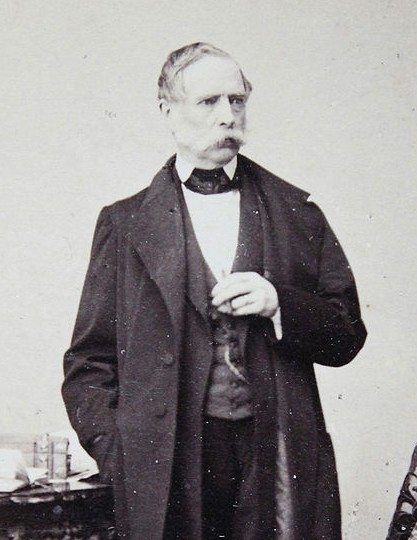

Prince of Salm-Reifferscheidt-Raitz
- Reign: 1839–1888
- Predecessor: Karl Joseph
- Successor: Hugo II
- Born: 15 September 1803; Brno, Margraviate of Moravia
- Died: 18 April 1888 (aged 84); Vienna, Austria-Hungary
- Spouse: Countess Leopoldine of Salm-Reifferscheidt-Krautheim (m. 1830; died 1878)
- Issue: Countess Maria Rosine; Hugo, 3rd Prince of Salm-Reifferscheidt-Raitz; Countess Augusta; Count Siegfried; Count Erich
Names
- Hugo Karel Eduard zu Salm-Reifferscheidt-Raitz
- House: Salm-Reifferscheidt-Raitz
- Father: Count Franz Joseph of Salm-Reifferscheidt-Raitz
- Mother: Countess Maria Josepha McCaffry von Keanmore

Hugo Karel Eduard, 2nd Prince of Salm-Reifferscheidt-Raitz (15 September 1803 – 18 April 1888), was a mediatized German prince who was an industrialist and politician.

== Early life ==
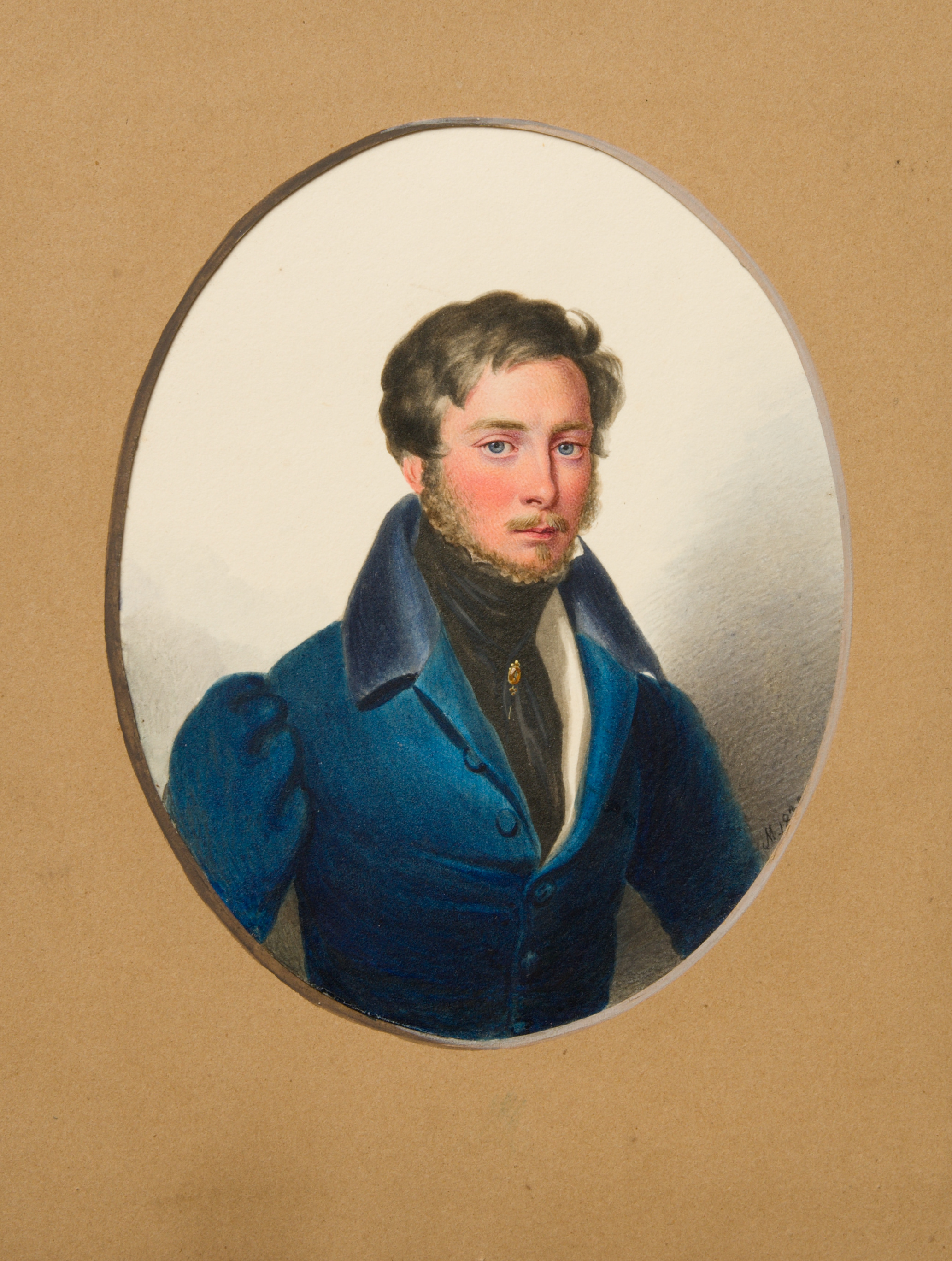
Portrait of a young Prince Hugo von Salm-Reifferscheidt-Raitz

Hugo was born on 15 September 1803 in Brno in the Margraviate of Moravia. He was the eldest son of Count Franz Joseph of Salm-Reifferscheidt-Raitz (1776–1836), and Countess Maria Josepha McCaffry von Keanmore. Among his siblings was brother Count Robert of Salm-Reifferscheidt-Raitz, who married Countess Felicitas von Clary und Aldringen (a daughter of Carl Joseph, 3rd Prince of Clary-Aldringen). His paternal grandparents were Karl Joseph, 1st Prince of Salm-Reifferscheidt-Raitz and Princess Maria Franziska of Auersperg (a daughter of Karl Josef, 5th Prince of Auersperg and sister of Wilhelm, 6th Prince of Auersperg). After his grandmother's death, his grandfather married Countess Antonia Maria von Paar (a daughter of Prince Wenzel Chrisostumus von Paar and Princess Maria Antonia of Liechtenstein, herself a daughter of Johann Nepomuk Karl, Prince of Liechtenstein). His maternal grandparents were Count Robert McCaffry von Keanmore and Countess Maria Anna von Blümegen.

== Career ==
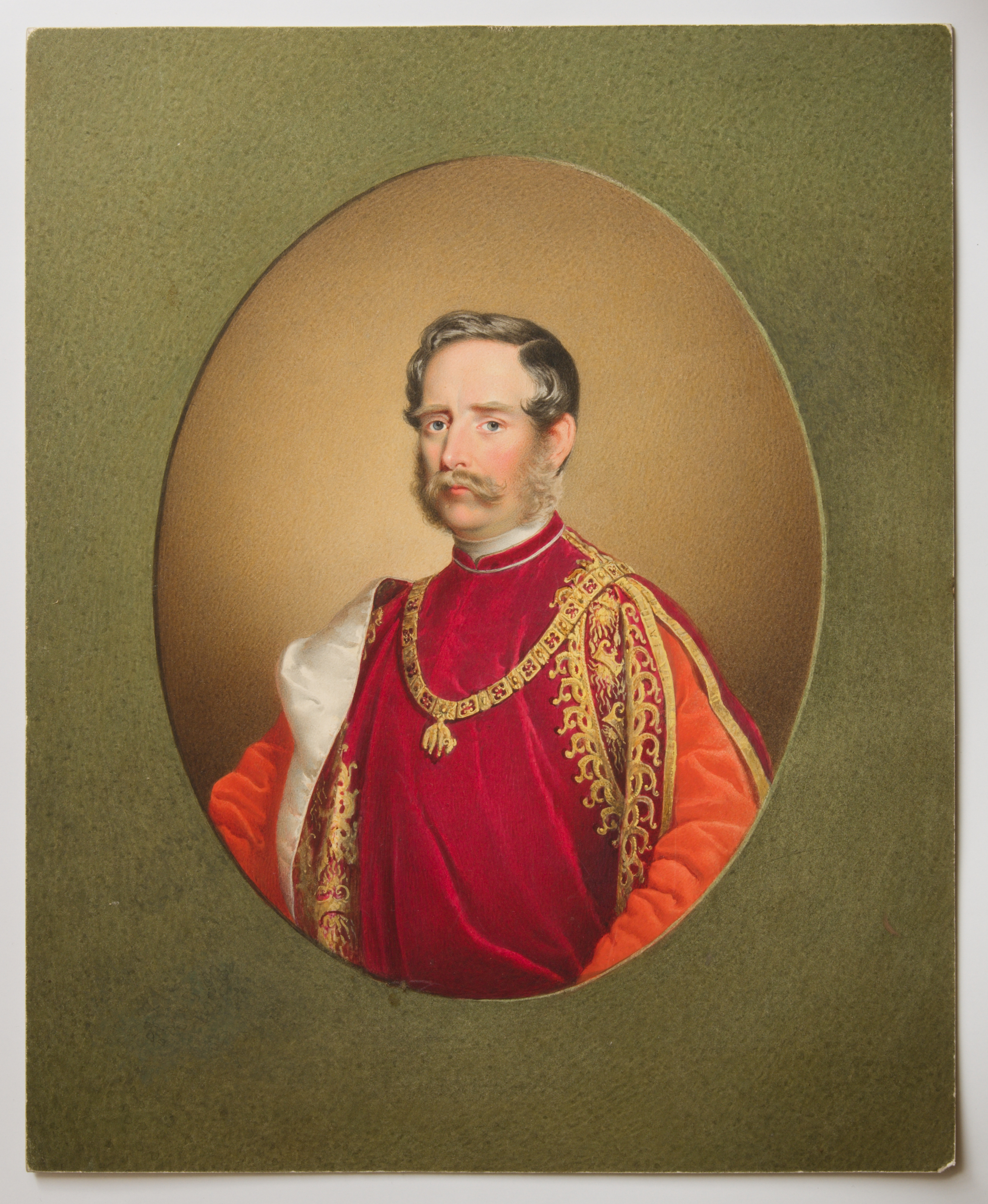
Portrait of Prince Hugo Salm-Reifferscheidt-Raitz in the robes of the Order of the Golden Fleece

As his father predeceased his grandfather, upon the latter's death on 16 June 1838, he succeeded as the 2nd Prince of Salm-Reifferscheidt-Raitz. His grandfather had previously succeeded his father as the 2nd Count of Salm-Reifferscheidt-Raitz, (Note: The County of Salm-Reifferscheidt-Raitz came into existence in Central Moravia (now part of the Czech Republic) after a partition of Salm-Reifferscheidt-Bedburg line in 1734.) before he was elevated to Reichsfürst in 1790. His grandfather's reign over his Imperial Estate as Prince of Salm-Reifferscheidt-Raitz was shortlived, however, as his territory was mediatized in 1811. In 1852, he received the title of Privy Councilor and was a holder of the Order of the Golden Fleece.

Between 1849 and 1864, he was director of the Moravian-Silesian Agricultural Society and oversaw the establishment of a chemical research station for agriculture. He was also the owner of the ironworks in Blansko, the lignite mines in Gaya, and the hard coal mines in Ostrava.

=== Political career ===
From 1848 to 1849 he was president of the newly established Moravian Diet. In 1861 he was again elected to the Diet and served as Governor of Moravia until 1867. In 1857 he became a member of the permanent Imperial Council, and of the expanded Imperial Council in 1860. In Parliament he represented the positions of the conservative nobility. In 1861 he became a hereditary member of the House of Lords. In 1868 he protested against dualism, which he saw as a violation of the historical individuality of the Margraviate of Moravia.

== Personal life ==
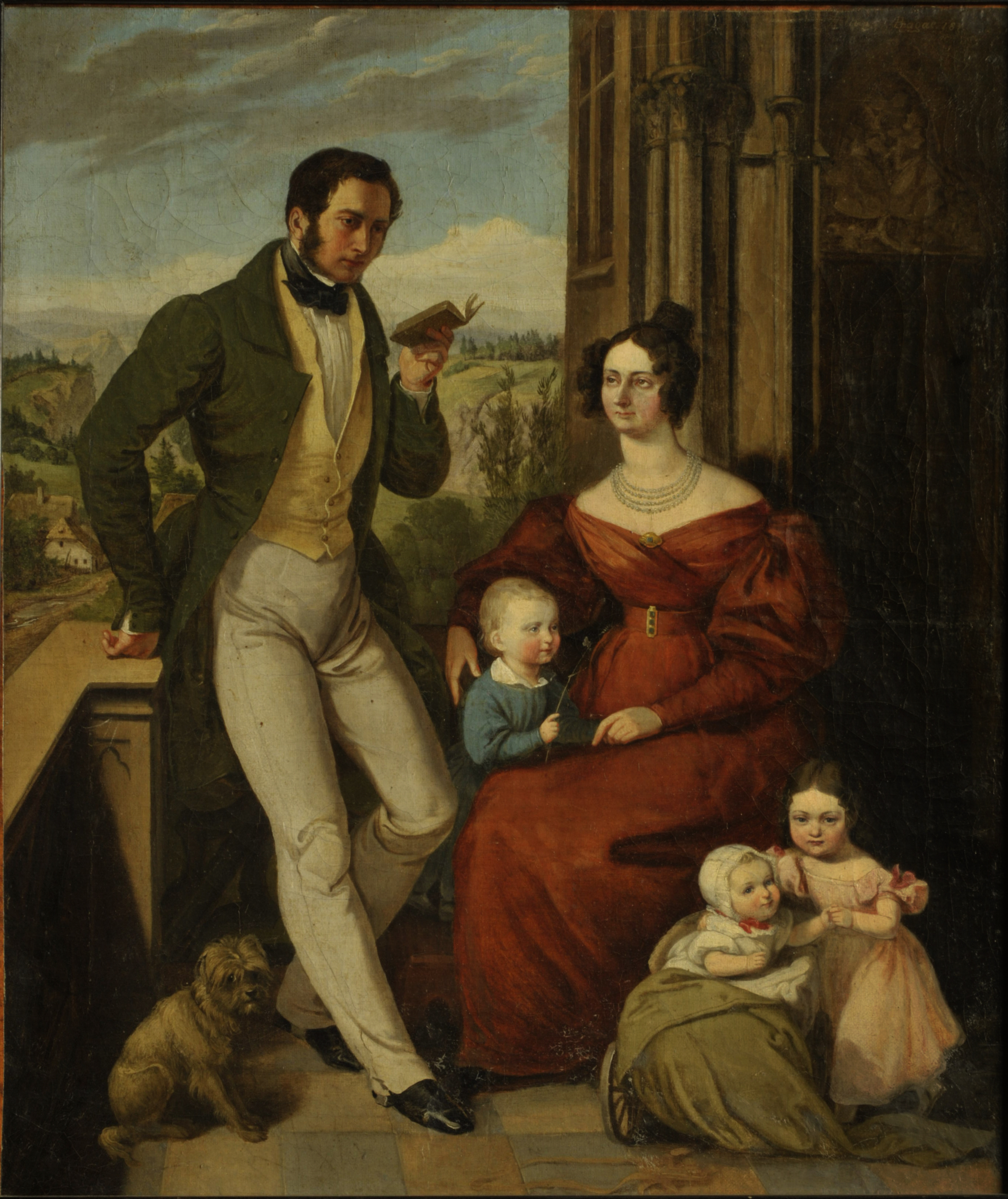
Portrait of Prince Hugo Salm-Reifferscheidt-Raitz, his wife Princess Leopoldine Polyxene, and three eldest children, by Josef Vojtěch Hellich

On 6 September 1830, Hugo was married to Countess Leopoldine Polyxene Christiane of Salm-Reifferscheidt-Krautheim (1805–1878), a daughter of Prince Franz Wilhelm of Salm-Reifferscheidt-Krautheim and Princess Franziska Luise of Hohenlohe-Bartenstein (sister of Louis Aloysius, Prince of Hohenlohe-Waldenburg-Bartenstein). Together, they were the parents of five children:

- Countess Maria Rosine Leopoldine Auguste Franziska Wilhelmine Aloysia (1831–1845), who died young.
- Hugo Karl Franz de Paula Theodor of Salm-Reifferscheidt-Raitz (1832–1890), who married Princess Elisabeth of Liechtenstein, a daughter of Prince Karl Joseph of Liechtenstein and Countess Franziska von Würben und Freudenthal, in 1858.
- Countess Augusta Aloysia Marie Eleonore Rosine Leopoldine Berthilde of Salm-Reifferscheidt-Raitz (1833–1891), who married Count Heinrich Jaroslaw Clam-Martinic, a son of Count Karl Johann Nepomuk of Clam-Martinic and the former Lady Selina Meade (a daughter of the 2nd Earl of Clanwilliam), in 1851.
- Count Siegfried Constantin Bardo of Salm-Reifferscheid-Raitz (1835–1898), a member of the House of Deputies and Bohemian Diet; he married Countess Rudolfine Czernin von und zu Chudenitz, a daughter of Count Jaromir Czernin von und zu Chudenitz and Countess Karolina Schaffgotsch, in 1864.
- Count Erich Adolf Karl Georg Leodgar of Salm-Reifferscheidt-Raitz (1836–1884), who married Donna Maria Alvarez de Toledo, a daughter of Don Ignacio Álvarez de Toledo Palafox and Teresa Álvarez de Toledo Silva-Bazán. (Note: Don Ignacio Álvarez de Toledo Palafox (1812–1878), the youngest son of Francisco de Borja Álvarez de Toledo, 12th Marquis of Villafranca, married his niece, Teresa Álvarez de Toledo Silva-Bazán (1824–1883), the daughter of Don Ignacio Álvarez's elder brother, Pedro de Alcántara Álvarez de Toledo, 13th Marquess of Villafranca.)

His wife died on 4 July 1878 in Brühl near Vienna. Prince Hugo died in Vienna, Austria-Hungary, on 18 April 1888. He was buried at Salm Cemetery in Sloup.

=== Descendants ===
Through his eldest son Hugo, he was a grandfather of Countess Maria Leopoldine of Salm-Reifferscheidt-Raitz (who married Count Karol Lanckoroński and Count Marko Heinrich von Bombelles); Hugo Leopold, 4th Prince of Salm-Reifferscheidt-Raitz (1863–1903); Countess Elisabeth of Salm-Reifferscheidt-Raitz (who married Count Wladimir Mittrowsky); Count Karl Boromäus of Salm-Reifferscheidt-Raitz (who married Princess Elisabeth of Fürstenberg); (Note: Princess Elisabeth of Fürstenberg (1878–1939) was a daughter of Prince Emil Egon of Fürstenberg (son of Charles Egon II, Prince of Fürstenberg) and Countess Leontine von Khevenhüller-Metsch (a daughter of Richard, 5th Prince of Khevenhüller-Metsch).) and Countess Eleonore of Salm-Reifferscheidt-Raitz (who married Count Albert von Herberstein).

Through his second son Siegfried, he was a grandfather of Count Rudolf of Salm-Reifferscheidt-Raitz (who married Countess Marie von Wallis); Count Erich of Salm-Reifferscheidt-Raitz; Count Robert of Salm-Reifferscheidt-Rait; Countess Augustine of Salm-Reifferscheidt-Raitz; and Countess Leopoldine of Salm-Reifferscheidt-Raitz.

== Gallery ==
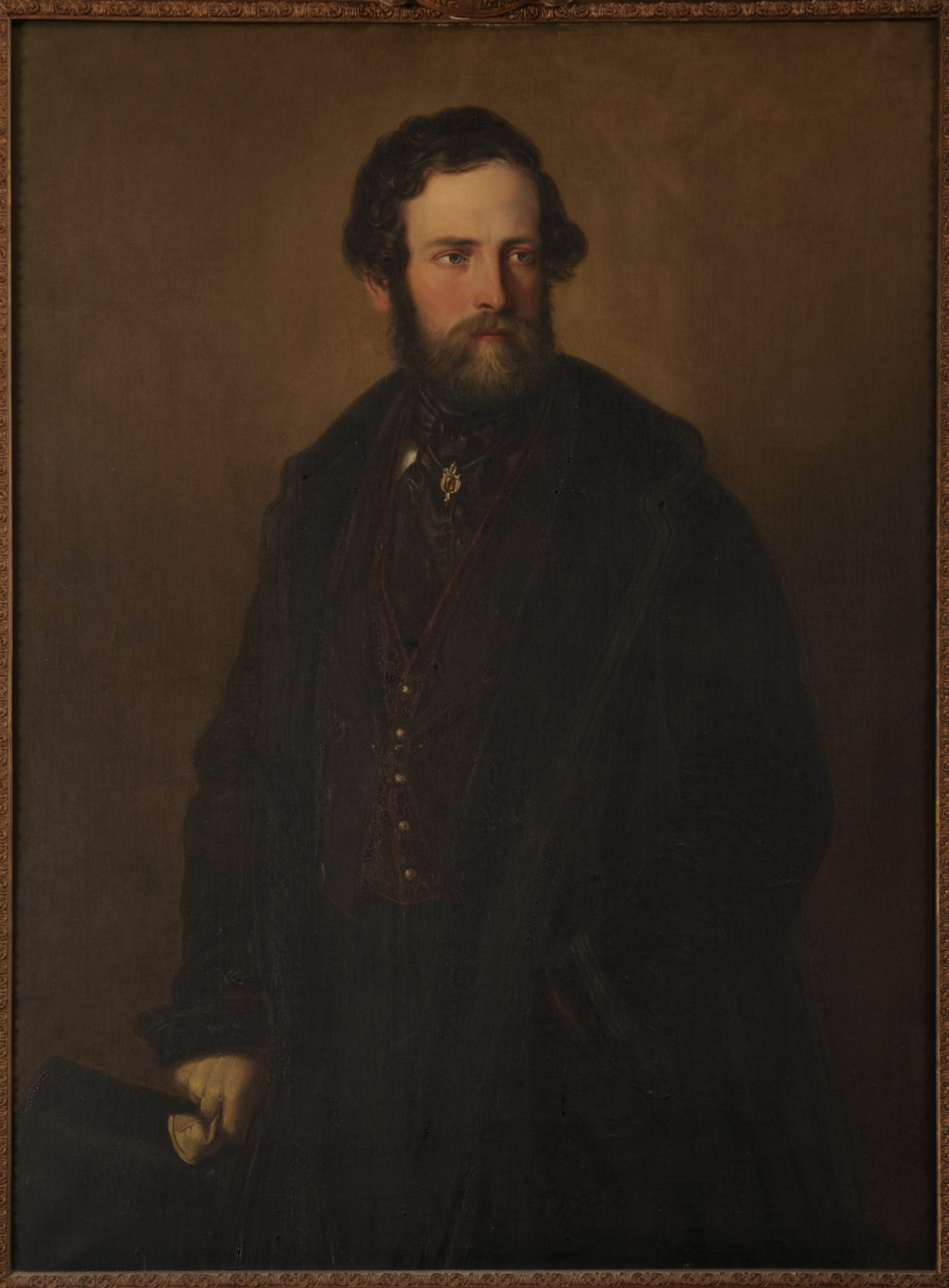
Portrait of Prince Hugo by Engelbert Seibertz

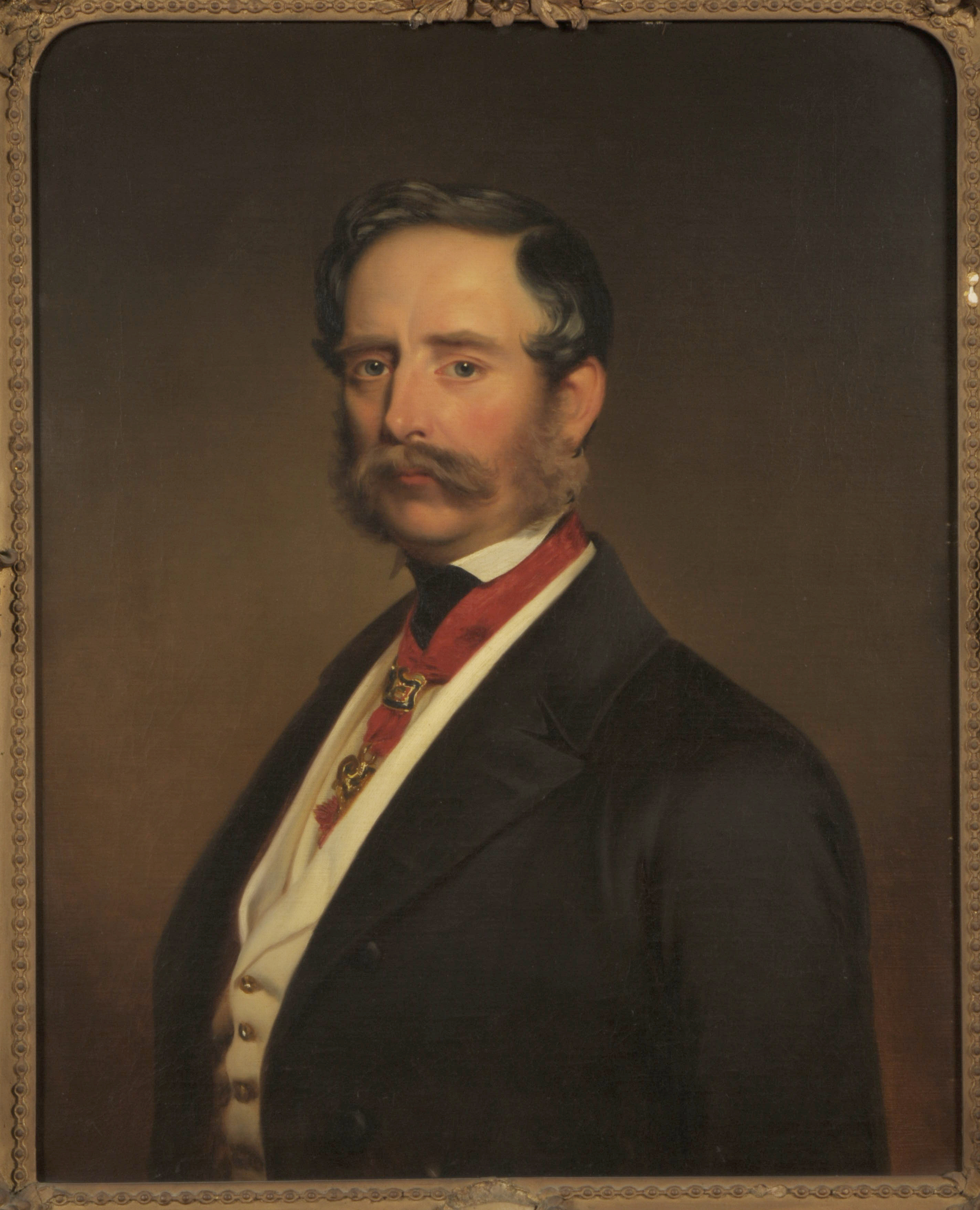
Portrait of Prince Hugo by Jan Adolf Brandeis

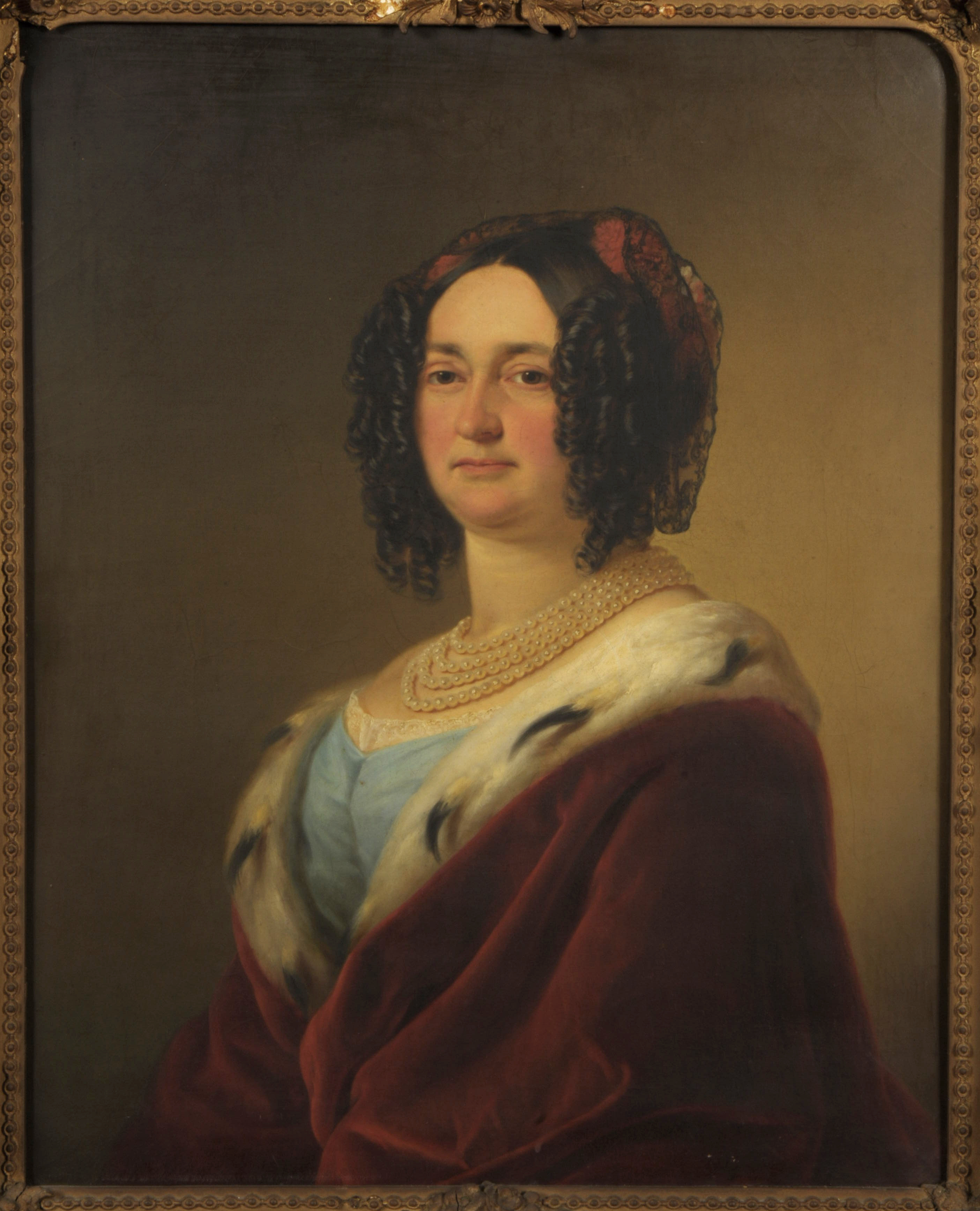
Portrait of his wife, Princess Leopoldina, by Jan Adolf Brandeis

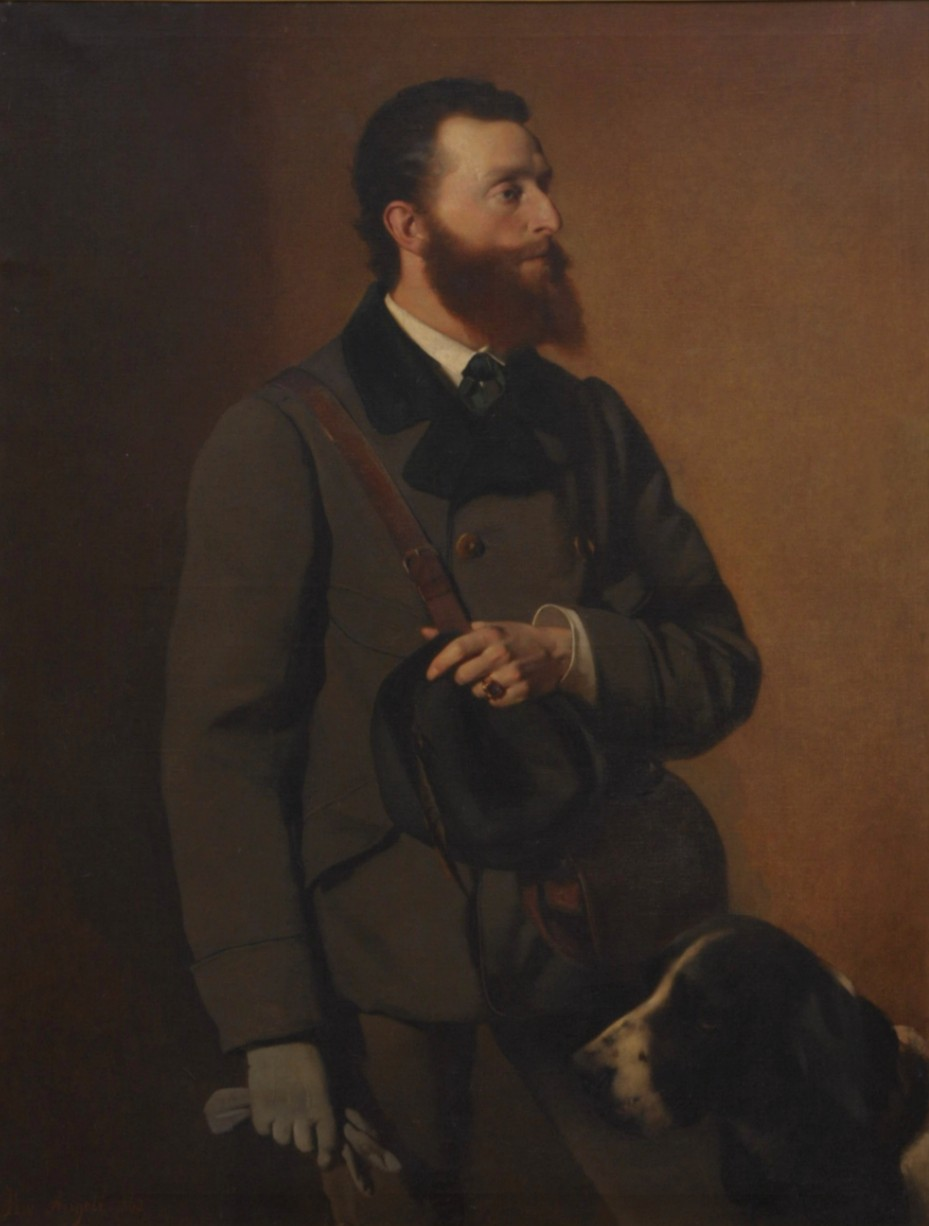
Portrait of his eldest son, Prince Hugo, by Heinrich von Angeli, c. 1885

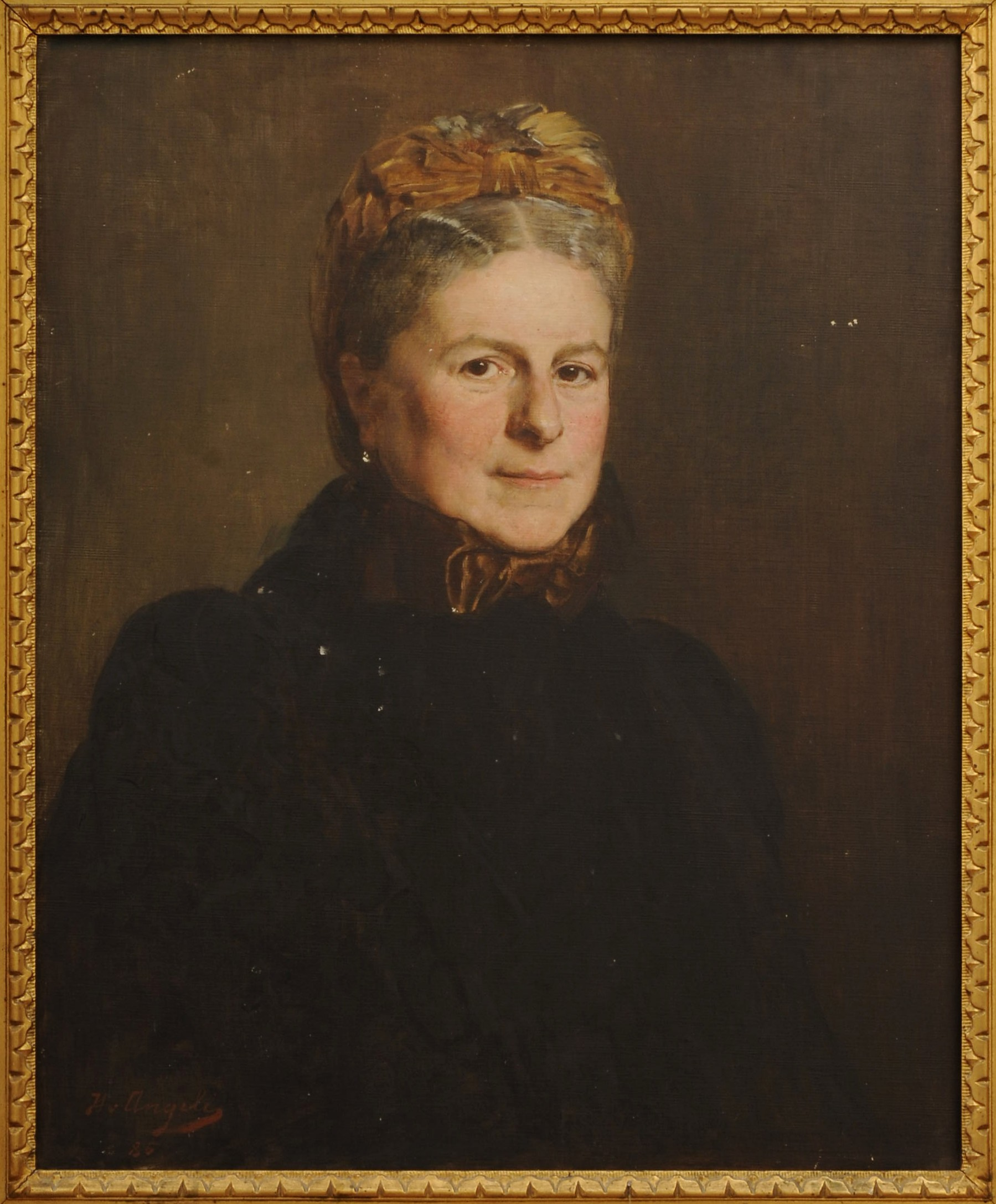
Portrait of his daughter-in-law, Princess Elisabeth of Liechtenstein, by Heinrich von Angeli, 1885
