= Rájec-Jestřebí =

- Town
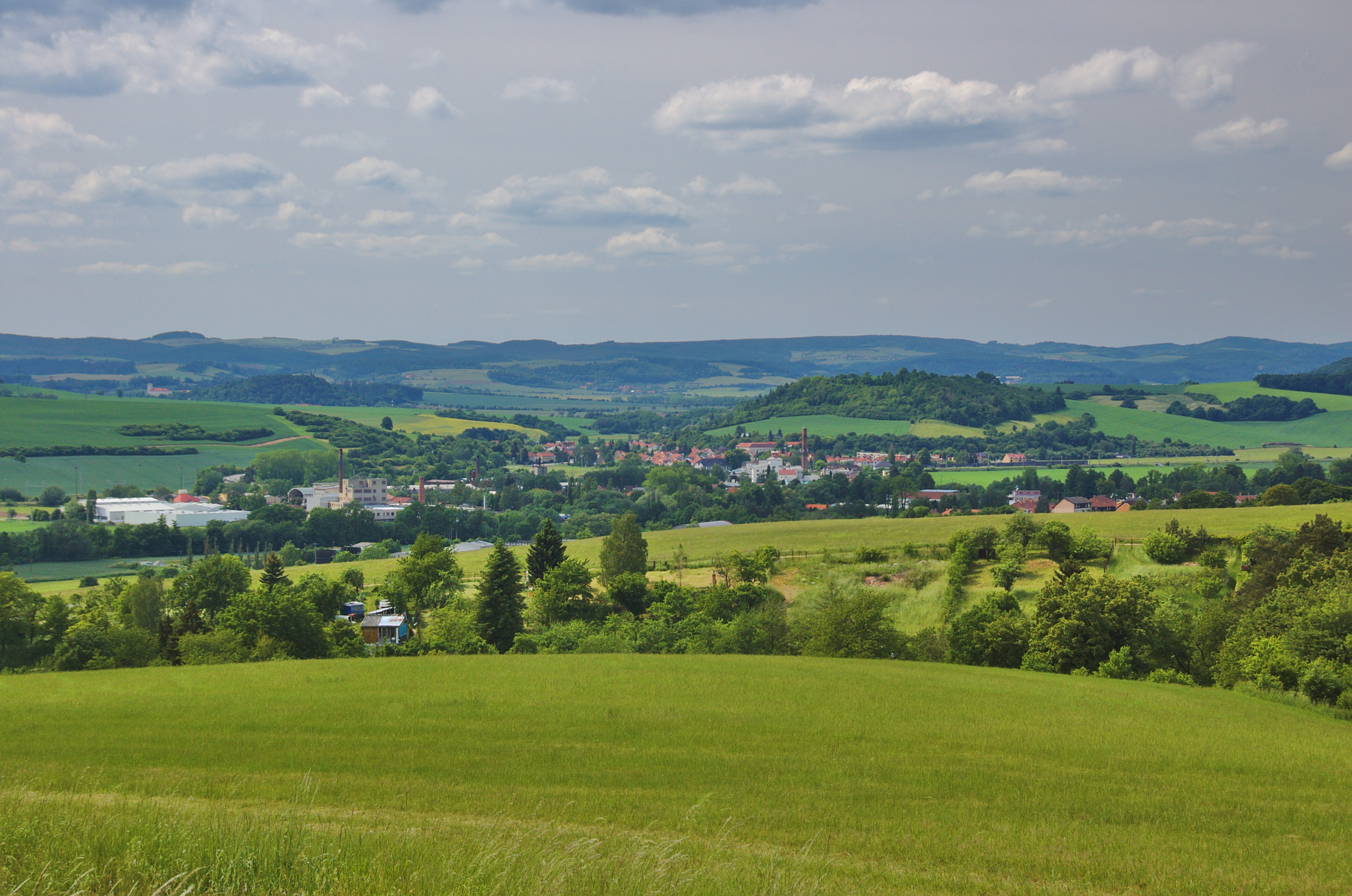
- View from the southeast

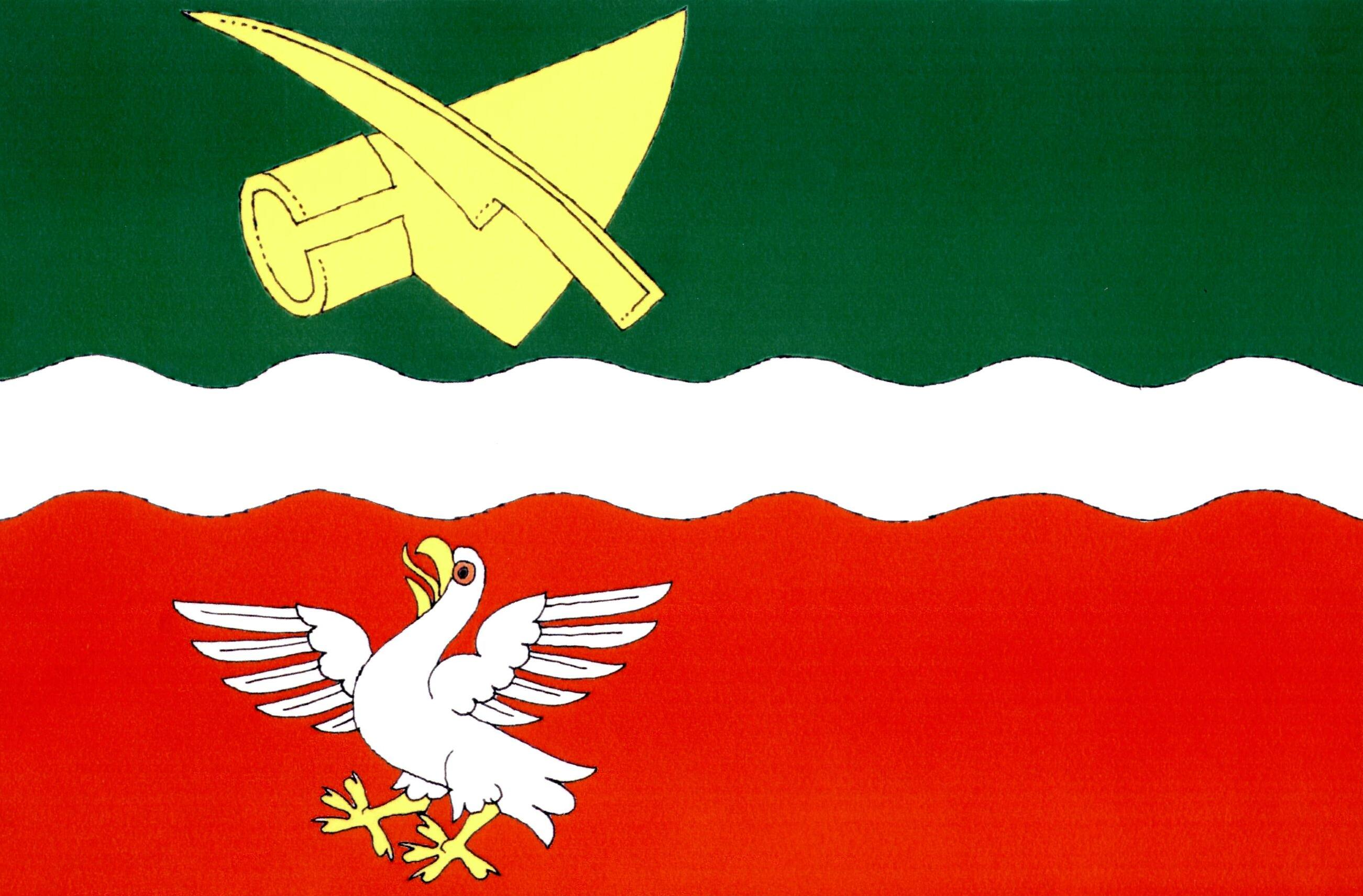
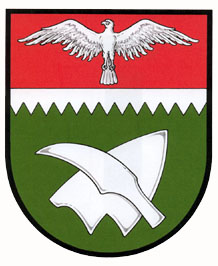
- Flag Coat of arms

- Location in the Czech Republic
- Coordinates: 49°24′39″N 16°38′21″E
- Country: Czech Republic
- Region: South Moravian
- District: Blansko
- First mentioned: 1141

Government
  - Mayor: Romana Synakieviczová

Area
  - Total: 15.67 km^{2} (6.05 sq mi)
- Elevation: 295 m (968 ft)

Population (2026-01-01)
  - Total: 3,740
  - Density: 239/km^{2} (618/sq mi)
- Time zone: UTC+1 (CET)
  - Summer (DST): UTC+2 (CEST)
- Postal code: 679 02
- Website: www.rajecjestrebi.cz

Rájec-Jestřebí (Czech pronunciation: [ˈraːjɛts ˈjɛstr̝̊ɛbiː]; German: Raitz-Jestreb) is a town in Blansko District in the South Moravian Region of the Czech Republic. It has about 3,700 inhabitants. The town is located at the confluence of the Svitava River and the Býkovka Stream, in the Drahany Highlands.

The municipalities of Rájec and Jestřebí merged in 1960 and became a town in 1973. Rájec-Jestřebí is known for the Rájec nad Svitavou Castle, protected as a national cultural monument.

== Administrative division ==
Rájec-Jestřebí consists of four municipal parts (in brackets population according to the 2021 census):

- Rájec (2,349)
- Jestřebí (958)
- Holešín (210)
- Karolín (88)

== Geography ==
Rájec-Jestřebí is located about 5 kilometres (3 mi) north of Blansko and 21 km (13 mi) north of Brno. It lies in the Drahany Highlands. The highest point is the hill Spálená hora at 529 m (1,736 ft) above sea level. The town is situated at the confluence of the Svitava River and the Býkovka Stream.

== History ==
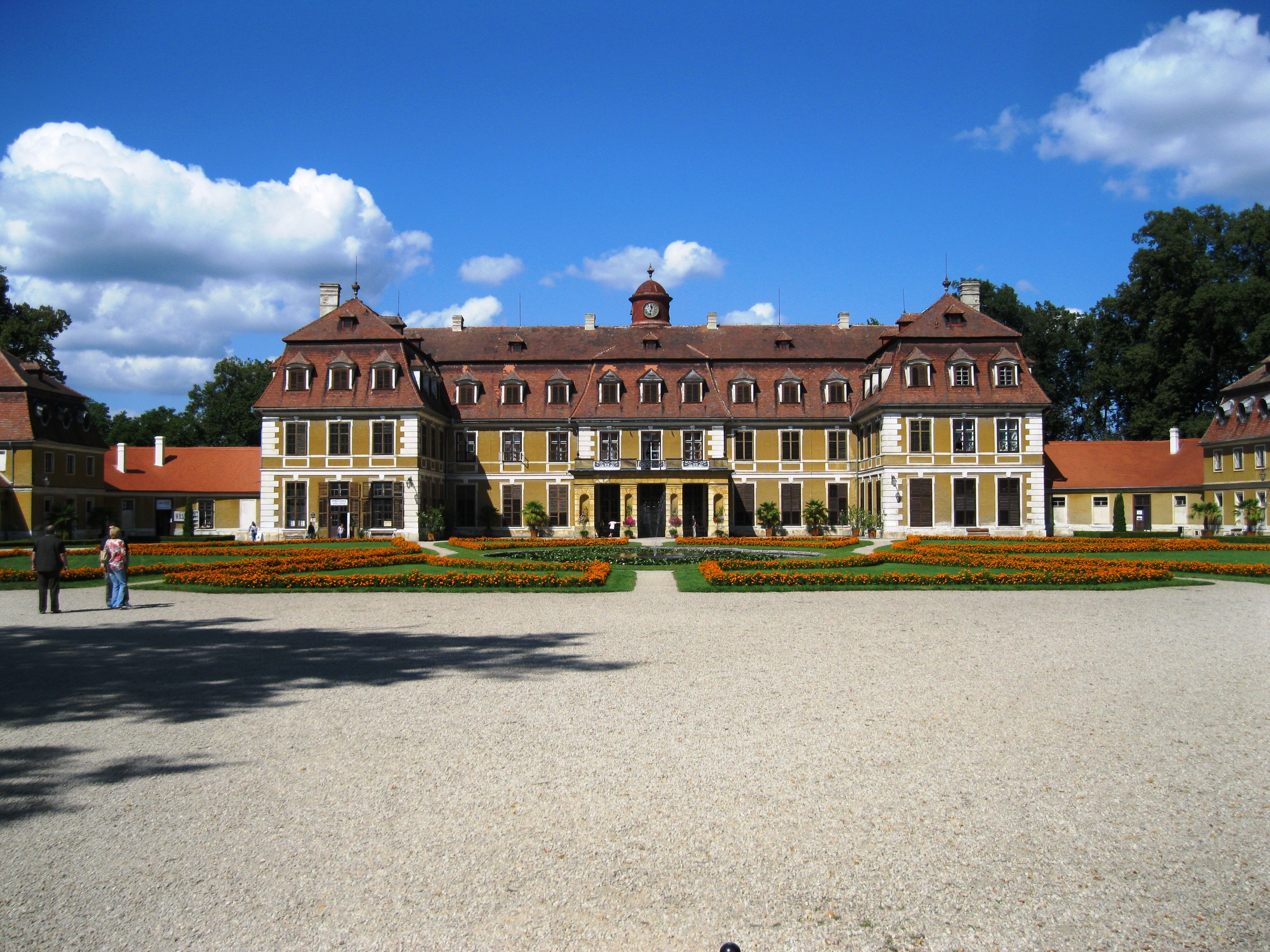
Rájec nad Svitavou Castle

The first written mention of Rájec is in a deed of Olomouc bishop Jindřich Zdík from 1141. There were two 13th-century castles that were probably destroyed in the struggles between Margrave Jobst of Moravia and his brother Prokop. It the 14th century, they were referred to as ruins. The first written mention of Jestřebí is from 1371, when it was owned by the Lords of Bořitov.

In 1570, one of the castle ruins was completely rebuilt by Bernard Drnovský to a Renaissance residence. After the male followers of the Drnovský family became extinct in 1618, it was owned by Johanna Drnovská, who married Styrian count Georg Ehrenreich of Roggendorf. After her death in 1667, Rájec was acquired by the Roggendorf family.

In 1757, Rájec Castle was completely destroyed by fire. In 1763, Antonín Karel of Salm-Reifferscheid bought Rájec and had the Neoclassical castle built in 1763–1769. The English park was founded in 1767 and extended to its current form is 1830. After World War II, the Salm-Reifferscheid family was disseized and expelled. In 1960, the municipalities of Rájec and Jestřebí merged.

In 1973, Rájec-Jestřebí obtained the town status.

== Demographics ==
Historical population

Year	Pop.	±%
1869	2,032	—
1880	2,130	+4.8%
1890	2,297	+7.8%
1900	2,448	+6.6%
1910	2,911	+18.9%

Year	Pop.	±%
1921	3,006	+3.3%
1930	3,251	+8.2%
1950	3,300	+1.5%
1961	3,427	+3.8%
1970	3,506	+2.3%

Year	Pop.	±%
1980	3,576	+2.0%
1991	3,521	−1.5%
2001	3,562	+1.2%
2011	3,565	+0.1%
2021	3,605	+1.1%

Source: Censuses

== Transport ==
Rájec-Jestřebí is located on the railway line Brno–Letovice.

== Sights ==
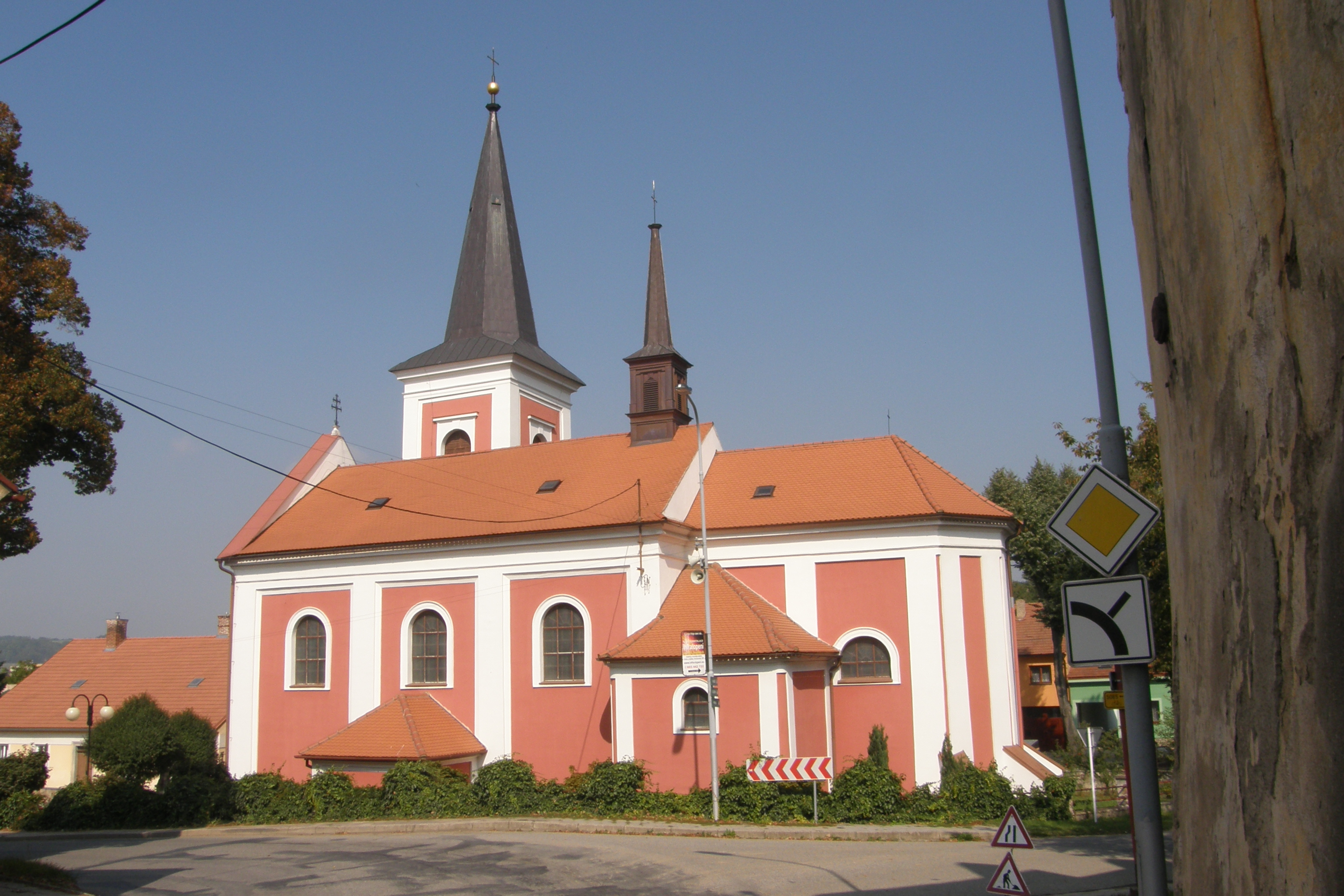
Church of All Saints

The main landmark of the town is the Rájec nad Svitavou Castle. It was built in the Neoclassical style in 1763–1769. Today it is owned by the state and open to the public. It contains various collections and one of the largest castle libraries with over 60,000 volumes. For its value, it is protected as a national cultural monument.

The Church of All Saints in Rájec was first mentioned in 1350. The tower was added in 1574. During the rule of the Roggendorfs, the Gothic structure was rebuilt in the Baroque style.

== Notable people ==
- Milan Horálek (1931–2012), economist and politician
