= Milan Horálek =

Czech economist and politician (1931-2012)

Milan Horálek (27 November 1931 in Rájec-Jestřebí – 13 November 2012) was a Czech economist and politician. He served as the Minister of Labour and Social Affairs of the former Czechoslovakia from 1990 to 1992. Horálek died on 13 November 2012, at the age of 80.
