= Salm-Reifferscheid-Raitz =

The House of Salm-Reifferscheidt-Raitz is a noble family of German descent established in Central Moravia (now part of the Czech Republic). It came into existence after a partition of Salm-Reifferscheid-Bedburg line in 1734, and was elevated to princely dignity in 1790.

== Counts of Salm-Reifferscheidt-Raitz (1734–1790) ==
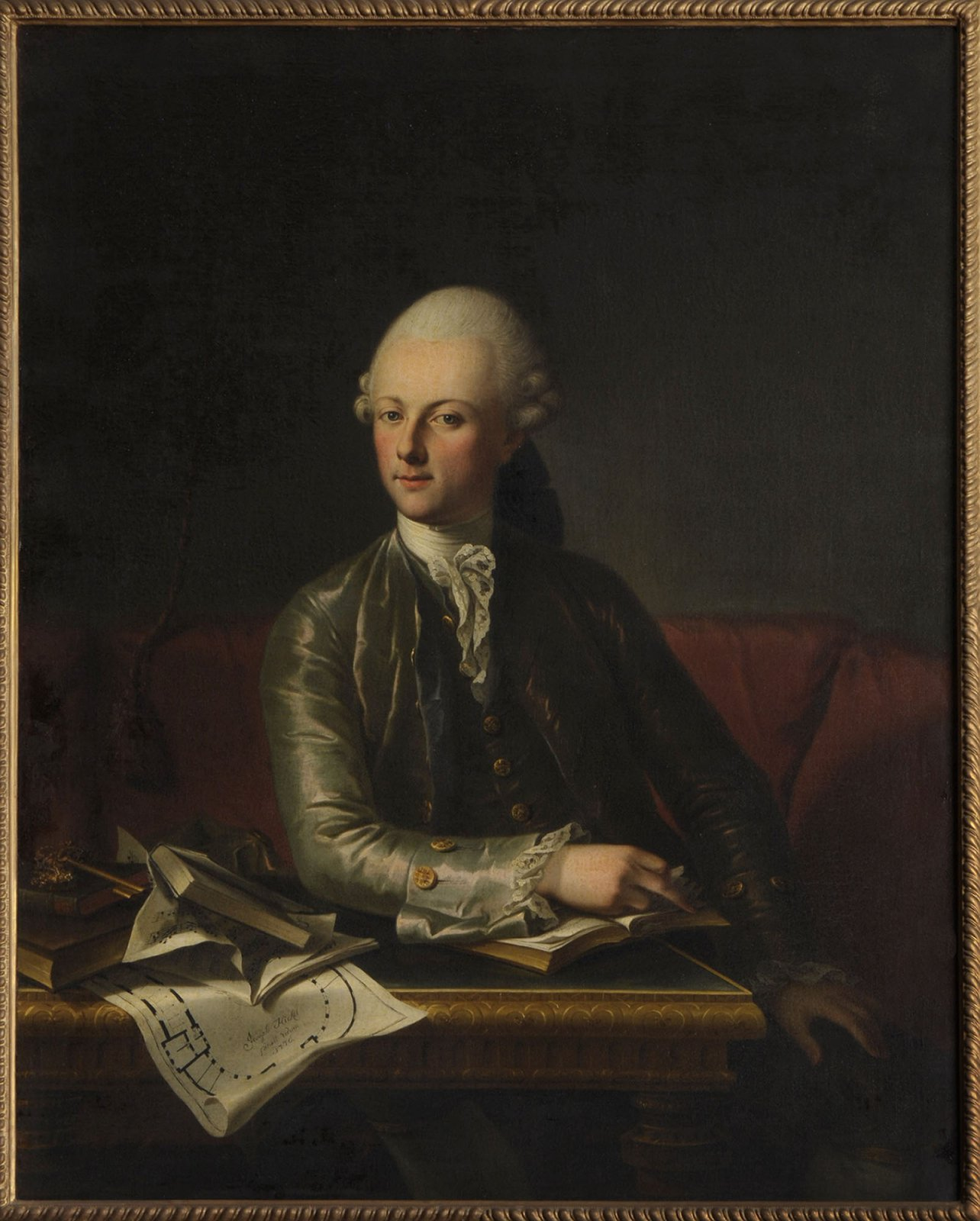
Portrait of Count Karl Joseph of Salm-Reifferscheidt-Raitz, later 1st Prince of Salm-Reifferscheidt-Raitz, by Joseph Hickel

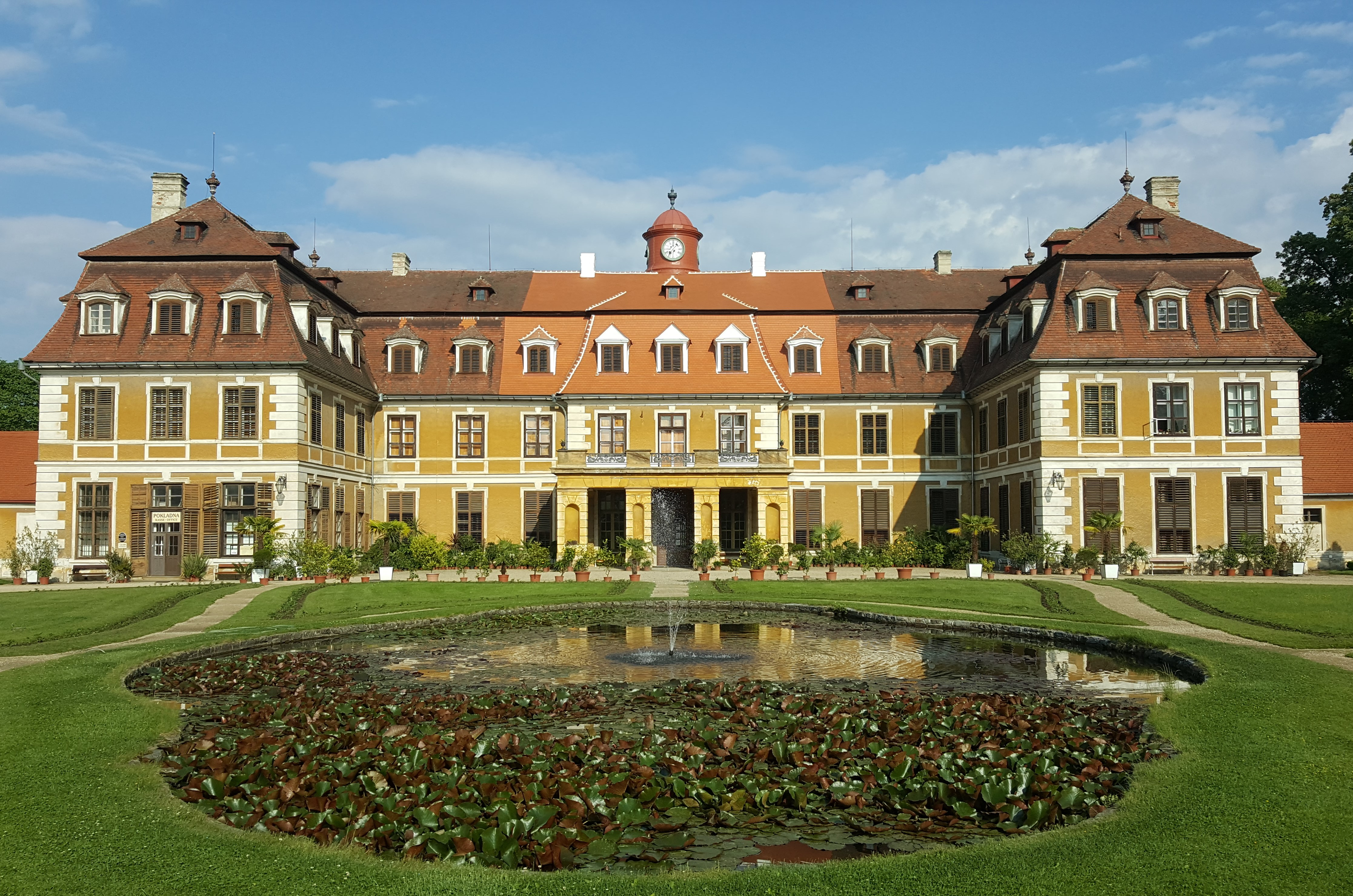
Rájec nad Svitavou Castle (German: Schloss Raitz)

- Anton Joseph Franz, Count 1734–1769 (1720–1769), fourth surviving son of Franz Wilhelm I, Count of Salm-Reifferscheidt-Bedburg
  - Karl Joseph, Count 1769–1790 (1750–1838), elevated to Reichsfürst 1790

== Princes of Salm-Reifferscheidt-Raitz (ruling 1790–1811) ==
- Karl Joseph, previously Count, 1st Prince 1790–1838 (1750–1838), mediatized 1811
  - Franz Joseph, Hereditary Prince of Salm-Reifferscheidt-Raitz (1776–1836)
    - Hugo I, 2nd Prince 1803–1888 (1803–1888)
      - Hugo II, 3rd Prince 1888–1890 (1832–1890)
        - Hugo III, 4th Prince 1890–1903 (1863–1903)
          - Hugo IV, 5th Prince 1903–1946 (1893–1946)
            - Hugo V, 6th Prince 1946–1974 (1933–1974)
              - Hugo VI, 7th Prince 1974–present (born 1973)
      - Prince Erich of Salm-Reifferscheidt-Raitz (1836–1884)
        - Prince August of Salm-Reifferscheidt-Raitz (1866–1942)
          - Prince Niklas, Count of Salm-Reifferscheidt-Ungnad-Weißenwolff 1969–1970 (1904–1970)
            - Prince Niklas, Count of Salm-Reifferscheidt-Ungnad-Weißenwolff 1970-2009 (1942–2009)
              - Prince Niklas (born 1972)
                - Prince Christoph Niklas (born 2003)
                - Princess Marietta (born 2005)
              - Prince Paul (born 1979)
              - Prince Conrad (born 1985)
            - Prince Franz (born 1944)
              - Prince Philipp (born 1971)
                - Prince Benedikt (born 2012)
                - Prince Leopold (born 2013)
            - Prince Karl (born 1951)
              - Prince Johannes (born 1997)
              - Prince Gabriel (born 1998)
              - Prince Matthäus (born 2002)

== See also ==
- House of Salm
