= Karl Joseph, 1st Prince of Salm-Reifferscheidt-Raitz =

Karl Joseph
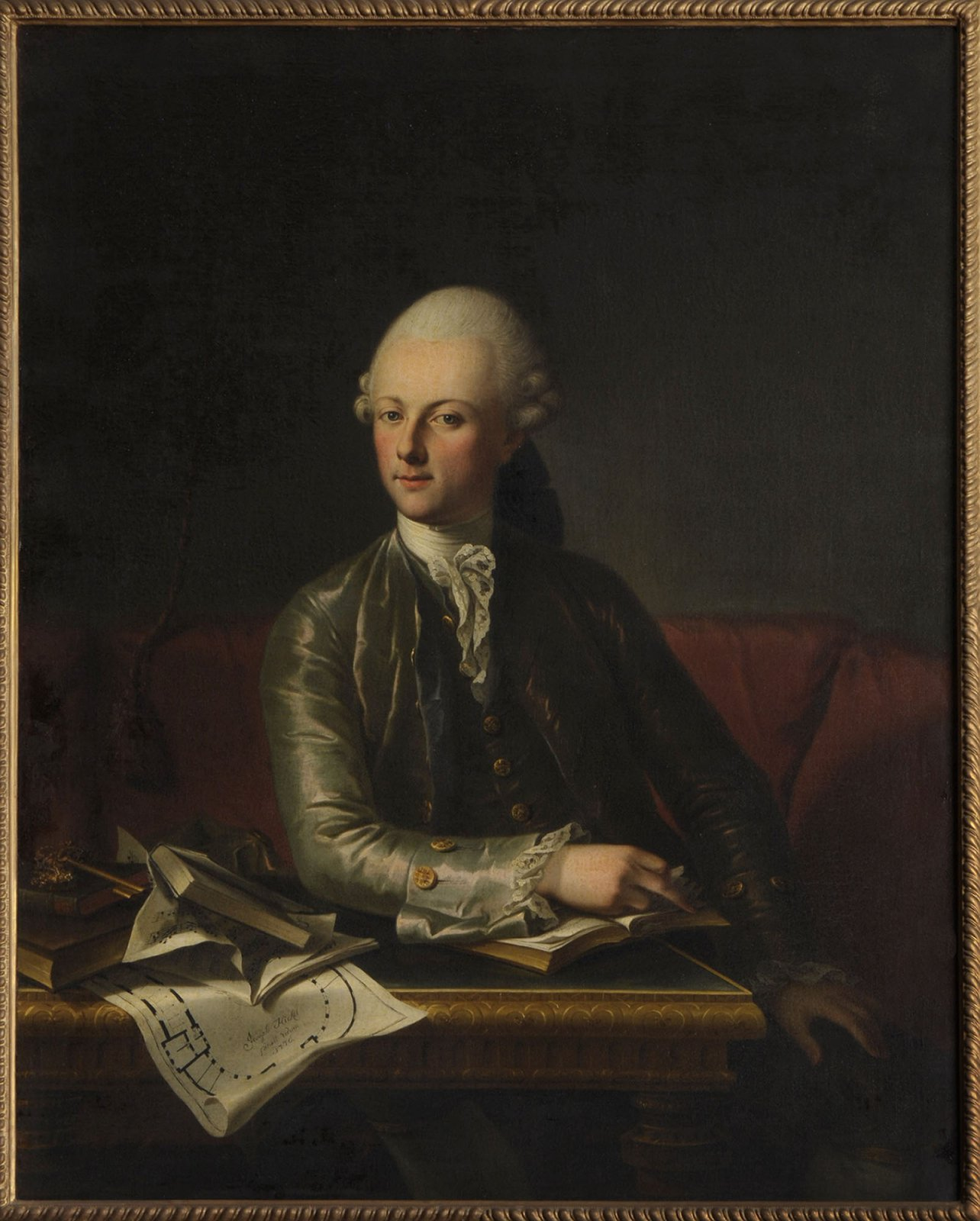
- Portrait of then Count Karl Joseph, by Joseph Hickel

Prince of Salm-Reifferscheidt-Raitz
- Reign: 1790–1839 (mediatized in 1811)
- Predecessor: None
- Successor: Hugo I
- Born: 3 April 1750; Vienna, Archduchy of Austria
- Died: 16 June 1838 (aged 88); Vienna, Austrian Empire
- Spouse: Princess Maria Franziska of Auersperg (m. 1775; died 1791) Countess Antonia Maria Paar (m. 1792; died 1838)
- Issue: Franz Joseph, Hereditary Prince of Salm-Reifferscheidt-Raitz
Names
- Karl Borromäus Joseph Franz de Paula Joachim Richard zu Salm-Reifferscheidt-Raitz
- Father: Anton, 1st Count of Salm-Reifferscheidt-Raitz
- Mother: Countess Raphaele von Rogendorf

Karl Borromäus Joseph Franz de Paula Joachim Richard, 1st Prince of Salm-Reifferscheidt-Raitz (3 April 1750 – 16 June 1838), previously 2nd Count of Salm-Reifferscheidt-Raitz from 1769 to 1790, was a German prince.

== Early life ==
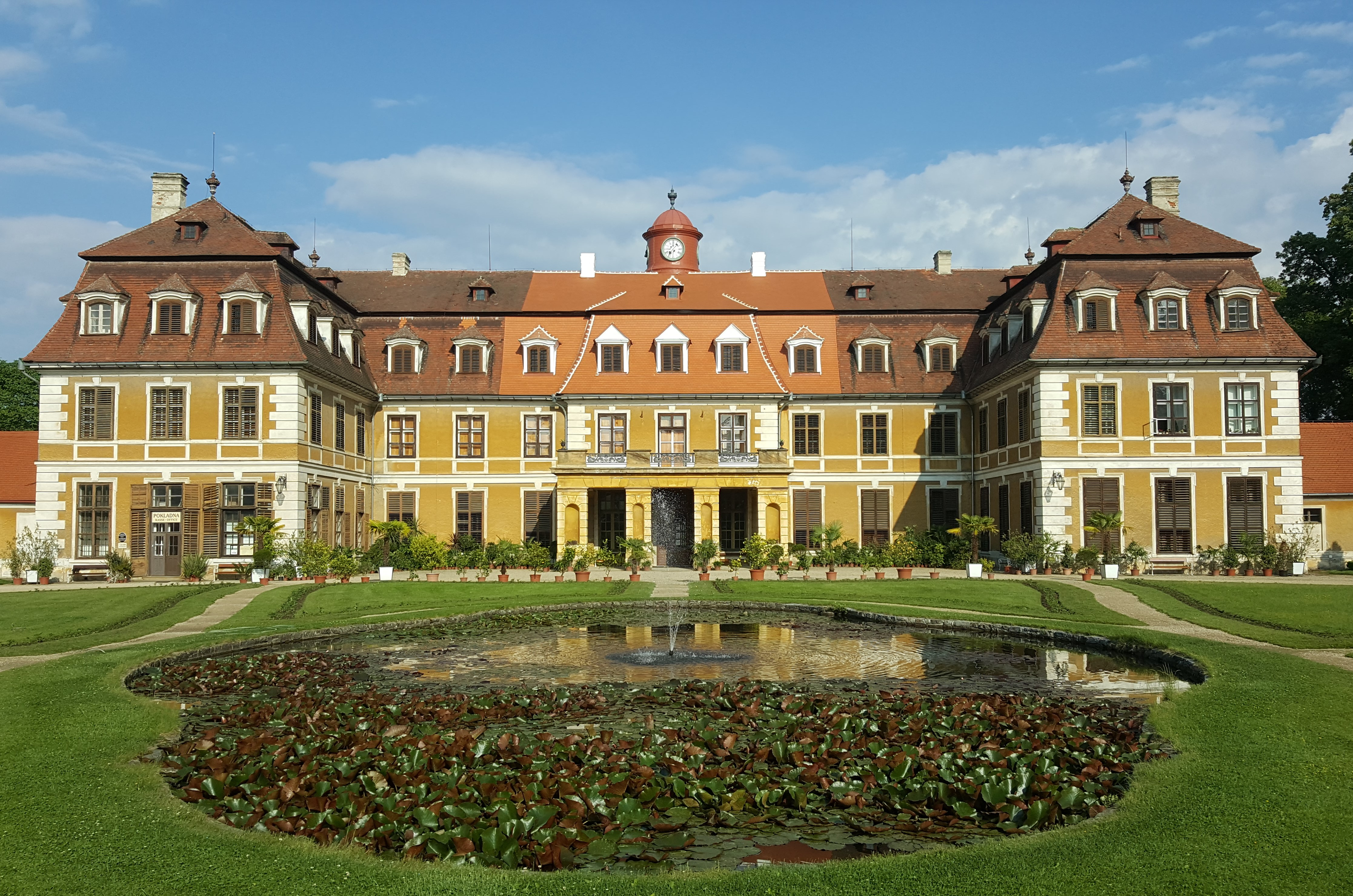
Raitz Castle, summer residence of the Salm-Reifferscheidt-Raitz branch of the House of Salm, South Moravian Region, Czech Republic

Karl Joseph was born in Vienna, Archduchy of Austria on 3 April 1750. He was the son of Countess Maria Anna Raphaele von Rogendorf (1718–1807) and Anton Joseph Franz von Salm-Reifferscheidt-Raitz (1720–1769). His sister, Maria Theresia zu Salm-Reifferscheidt, married Friedrich von Kageneck and, after his death in 1800, Auguste de Buissy. His father was the fourth surviving son of Franz Wilhelm I, Count of Salm-Reifferscheidt-Bedburg, and Princess Maria Karoline Anna of Liechtenstein (a daughter of reigning Anton Florian, Prince of Liechtenstein and Countess Eleonore Barbara von Thun und Hohenstein). His maternal grandparents were Count Karl Ludwig Josef von Rogendorf and Countess Karolina Anna Dorothea Pálffy of Erdöd.

== Career ==
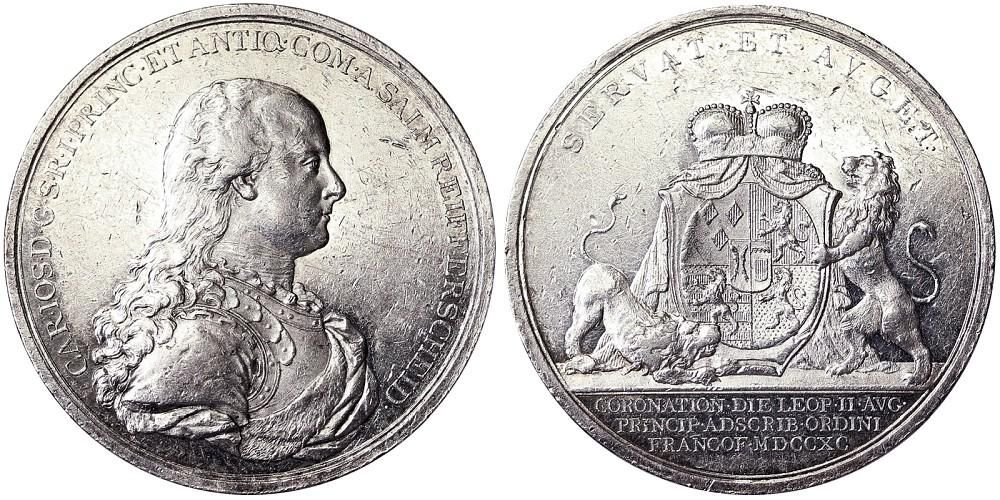
A silver medal by Ignaz Donner commemorating the elevation of Karl Josef to princely status in 1790

His father Anton Joseph Franz was created 1st Count of Salm-Reifferscheidt-Raitz in 1734 when the County came into existence in Central Moravia (now part of the Czech Republic) after a partition of Salm-Reifferscheidt-Bedburg line in 1734.

Upon the death of his father in 1769, he succeeded as the 2nd Count of Salm-Reifferscheidt-Raitz. In 1790, he was further ennobled when he was elevated to the rank of Reichsfürst. He ruled his Imperial Estate as Prince of Salm-Reifferscheidt-Raitz until his territory was mediatized in 1811.

== Personal life ==
On 8 June 1775 in Vienna, Karl Joseph was married to Princess Maria Franziska of Auersperg (1752–1791), a daughter of Karl Josef, 5th Prince of Auersperg and Countess Maria Josepha Trautson von Falkenstein. Her elder brother was Wilhelm, 6th Prince of Auersperg. Together, they were the parents of:

- Franz Joseph, Hereditary Prince of Salm-Reifferscheidt-Raitz (1776–1836), who married Countess Maria Josepha McCaffry von Keanmore, a daughter of Count Robert McCaffry von Keanmore and Countess Maria Anna von Blümegen.

After her death, he married Countess Antonia Maria von Paar (1768–1838), a daughter of Wenzel, 2nd Prince Paar and Princess Maria Antonia of Liechtenstein (a daughter of Johann Nepomuk Karl, Prince of Liechtenstein), in Vienna on 1 May 1792. She was sister to Karl, 3rd Prince Paar.

Prince Karl Joseph died in Vienna on 16 June 1838. As he was predeceased by his only son, he was succeeded by his grandson, Hugo. His widow died shortly thereafter on 25 October 1838 and was buried at Graz.

=== Descendants ===
Through his son Franz Joseph, he was a grandfather of Hugo, 2nd Prince of Salm-Reifferscheidt-Raitz (1803–1888) and Count Robert of Salm-Reifferscheidt-Raitz (1804–1875), who married Countess Felicitas von Clary und Aldringen (a daughter of Carl Joseph, 3rd Prince of Clary-Aldringen).
