= Jan Adolf Brandeis =

Portrait painter and photographer

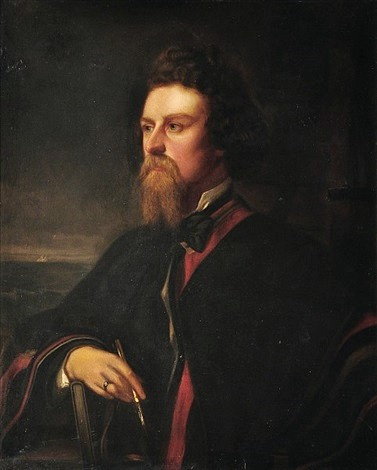
Self-portrait (1854)

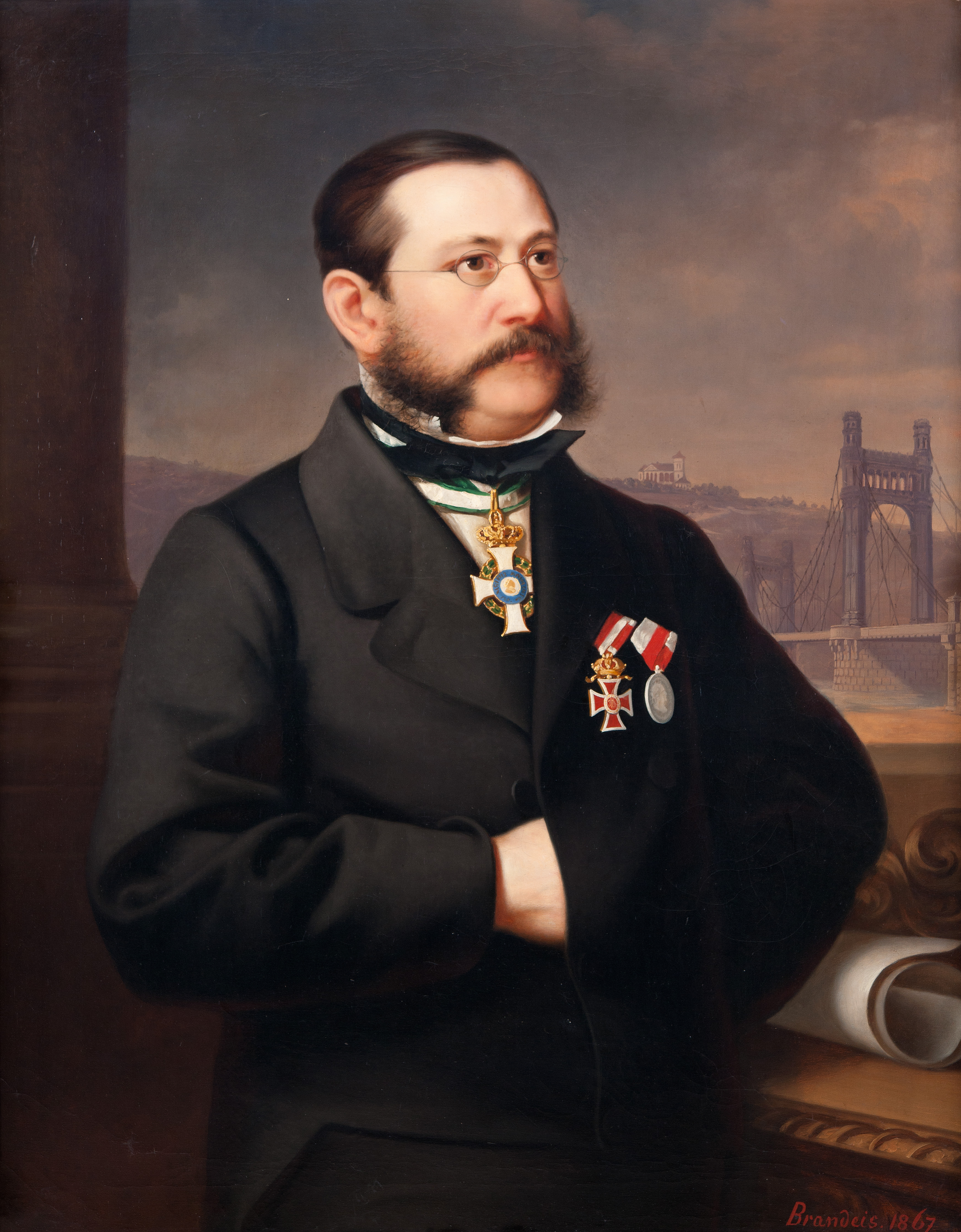
Václav Bělský, Mayor of Prague (1863-1867)

Jan Adolf Brandeis (9 June 1818, Týniště nad Orlicí – 13 November 1872, Prague) was a portrait painter and photographer.

== Life and work ==
He initially trained as a porcelain painter, then studied at the Academy of Fine Arts in Prague with František Tkadlík. He continued his studies in Munich with the portrait painter, Joseph Bernhardt, then went to Paris in 1852, where he worked in the studios of Thomas Couture. Upon returning to Prague, he set himself up as a painter of portraits and miniatures.

Around 1860, he began to experiment with daguerrotypes. In 1861, he opened a photography studio, in a garden belonging to Rudolf Thurn-Taxis, a nobleman and philanthropist. He specialized in pastel-colored portraits. After only three years, he closed the studio and sold his equipment at auction. He died in 1872, and was buried at Olšany Cemetery.

He was mostly known for his watercolor portrait miniatures, and numbered several noble families among his regular customers. As a photographer, he eschewed the use of artificial, painted backgrounds. His work in that field received praise from the magazine, Lumír. In his later years, he often painted portraits from photographs, rather than from life.
