= Rájec nad Svitavou Castle =

Neoclassical castle in the Czech Republic

Coordinates: 49°24′34″N 16°38′38″E

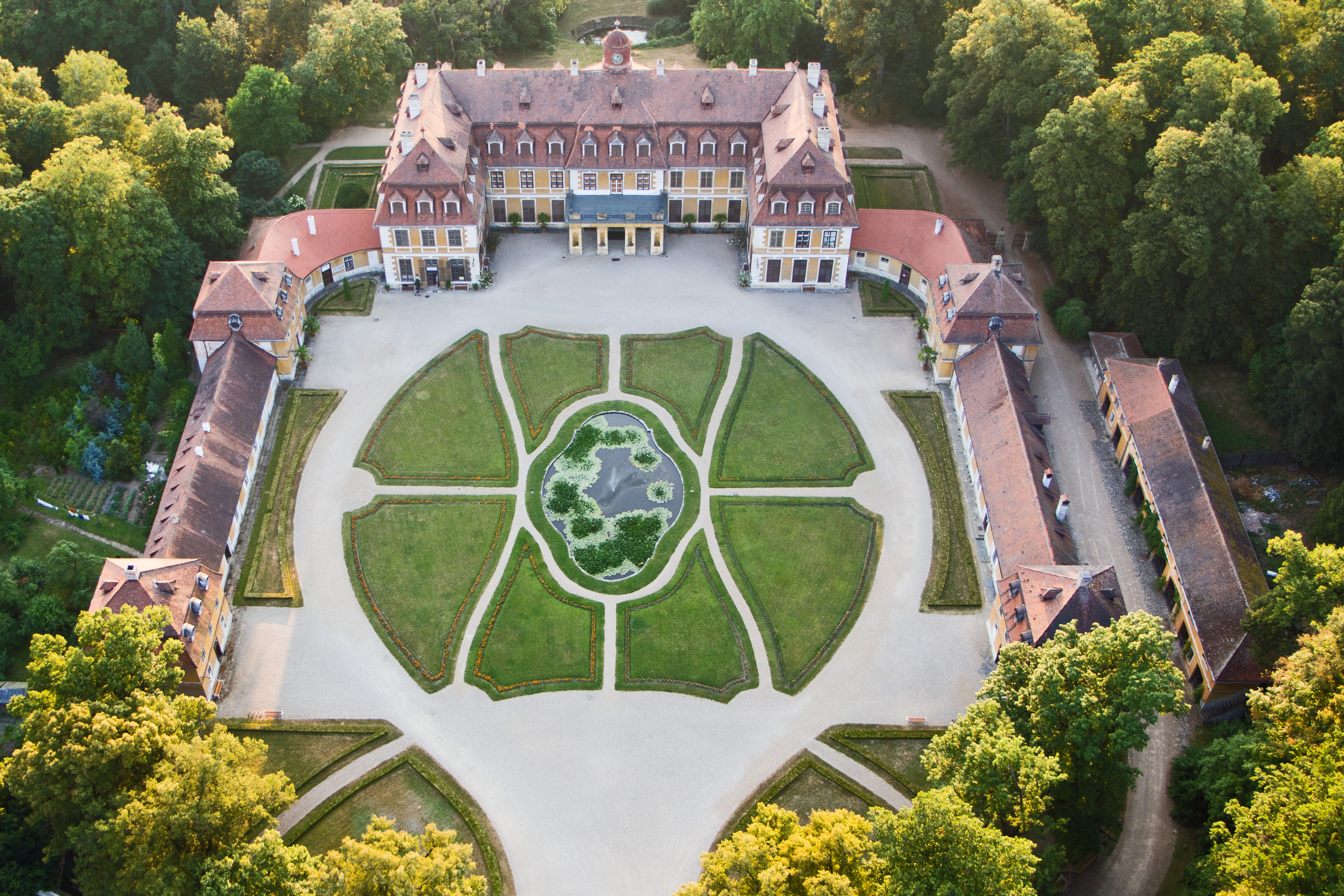
Aerial view of the castle

Rájec nad Svitavou Castle (Czech: zámek Rájec nad Svitavou, German: Schloss Raitz) is an early Neoclassical aristocratic residence in the South Moravian Region, Czech Republic.

== Geography ==
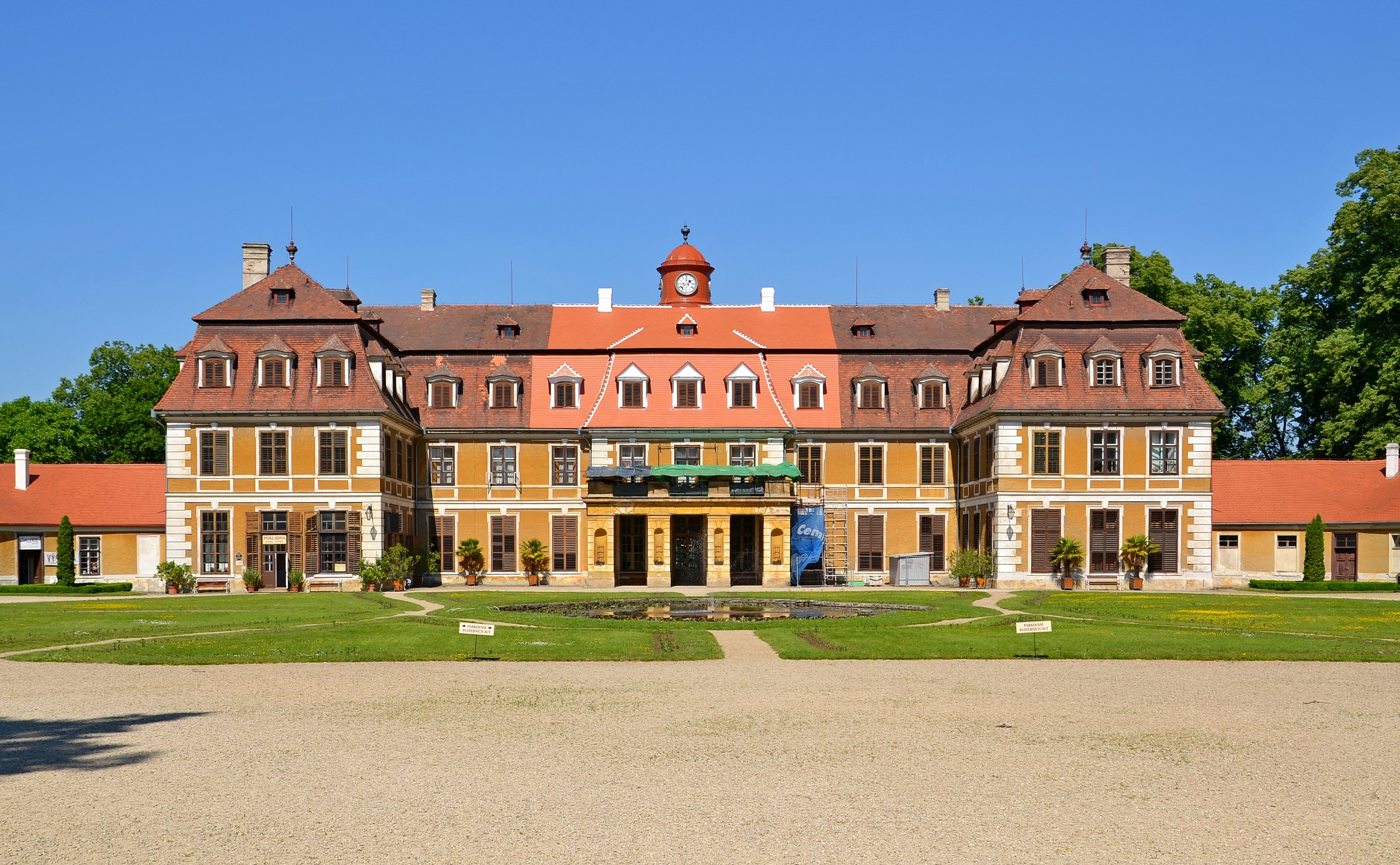
Front view

The castle is located in the village of Rájec (part of Rájec-Jestřebí), about 5 kilometres (3 mi) north of Blansko and 22 km (14 mi) north of Brno. The Svitava River, included in the castle's name, flows about 600 m (2,000 ft) west of the castle.

== History ==
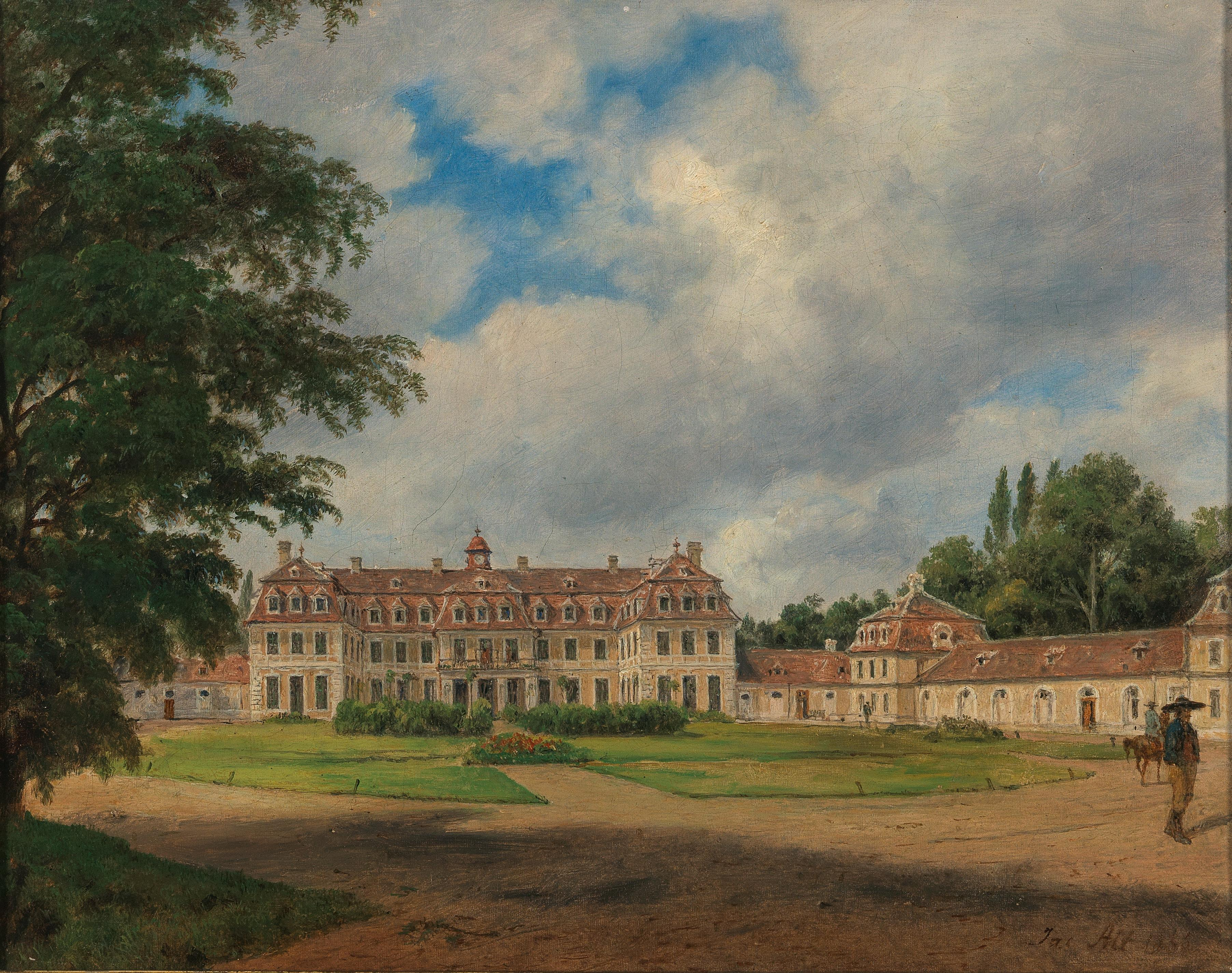
Painting of the castle by Jakob Alt, 1855

On the site of today's castle stood a medieval castle, which was likely destroyed by the end of the 14th century. In 1570, Bernhard Drnovský von Drnovice built a Renaissance castle on its site, which was destroyed by fire in 1746. The then owners moved to Sloup and sold the property to Count Anton Josef von Salm-Reifferscheidt in 1763. In the same year, Salm-Reifferscheidt began construction of the current castle and established the headquarters of the Salm-Reifferscheidt-Raitz line here.

After the Czech Constitutional Court confirmed the Czechoslovak citizenship of Hugo, 5th Prince of Salm-Reifferscheidt-Raitz, who died in Rájec in 1946, in August 2005, thereby annulling a decree of the Ministry of the Interior, a legal basis was created for the House of Salm-Reifferscheidt-Raitz to claim restitution for the castle and the associated 7,000 hectares of land.

== Description ==
In the spirit of Louis XVI, a two-story building with a mansard roof and a courtyard of honor (German: einem Ehrenhof) was built between 1763 and 1769. The plans were drawn up by the French architect Isidor Marcellus Amandus Ganneval (Isidore Canevale) working in Vienna. A notable outbuilding is the dovecote, which was part of the palace and built at the same time and is an early example of the Neo-Gothic style. On the ground floor of the main building, the reception rooms from the last quarter of the 19th century have largely been preserved.

In the 1950s, a painting collection belonging to the Salm family was housed on the first floor of the palace, which primarily features works by Dutch and Flemish masters. Other sights at the castle and in the surrounding landscape park are the numerous decorations and, in some cases, almost life-size sculptures made of cast iron, which the Prince, who was very open to modern technology, had manufactured in his own factory.

== 21st century ==
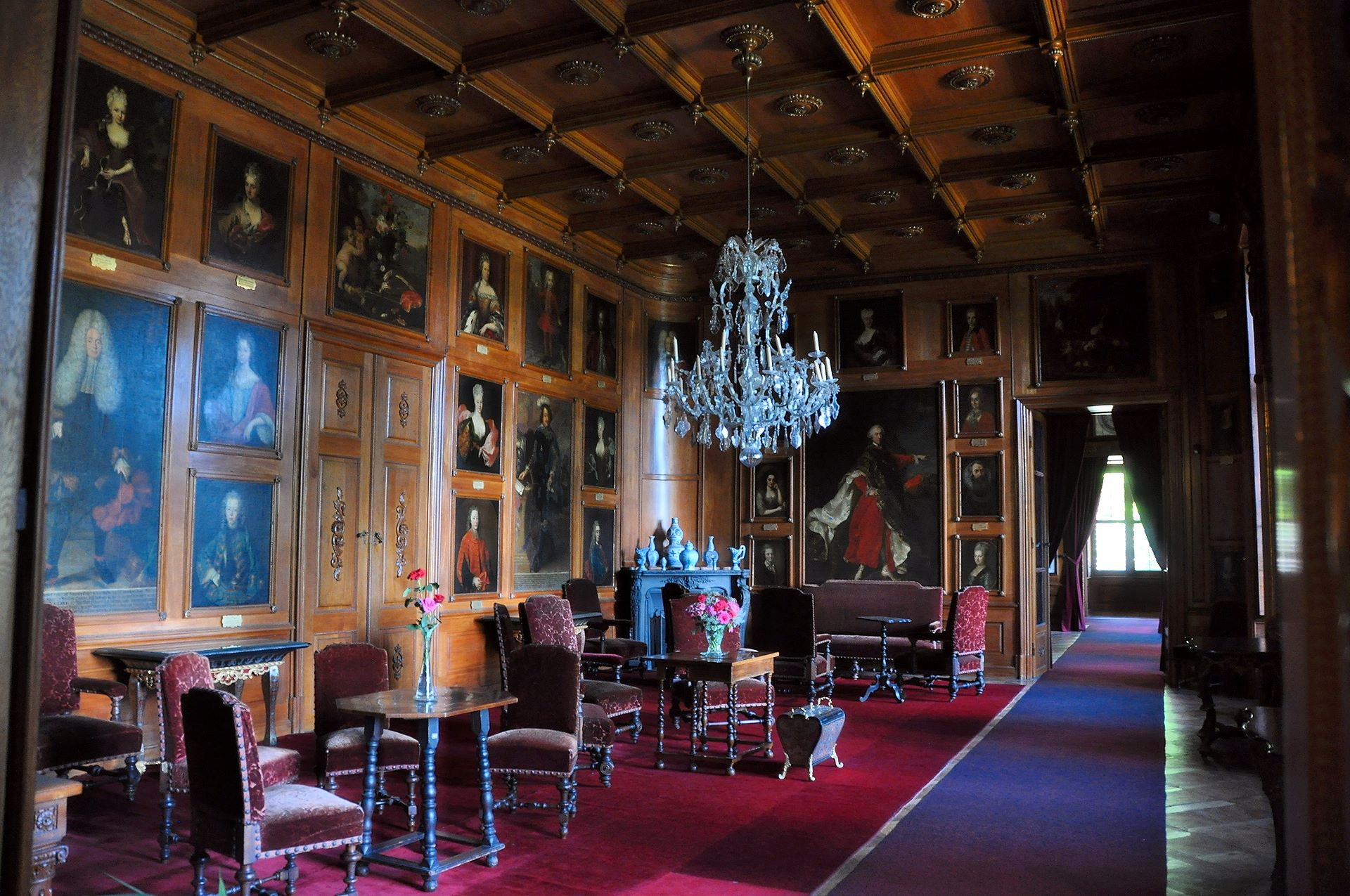
Castle interiors

From 2002, Rájec nad Svitavou Castle has been protected as a national cultural monument.

The castle is open to te public and offers guided tours. It is known for a library with a collection of over 60,000 books in eleven languages, which is one of the largest castle libraries in the Czech Republic. The castle also presents an extensive collection of oriental porcelain. Next to the castle is a garden, founded in 1767.

In 2022 and 2023, the castle was visited by 24–25 thousand visitors, making it the most visited tourist destination in Blansko District.

== Gallery ==
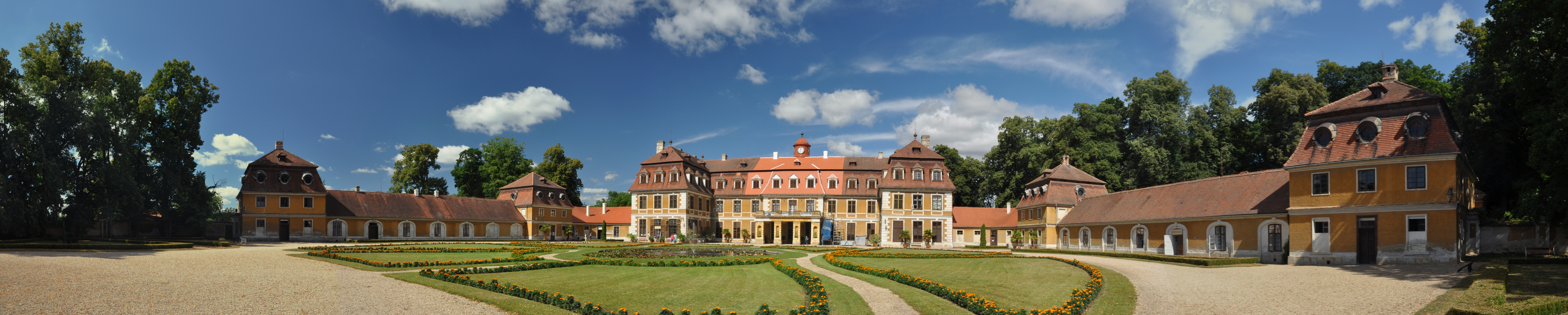

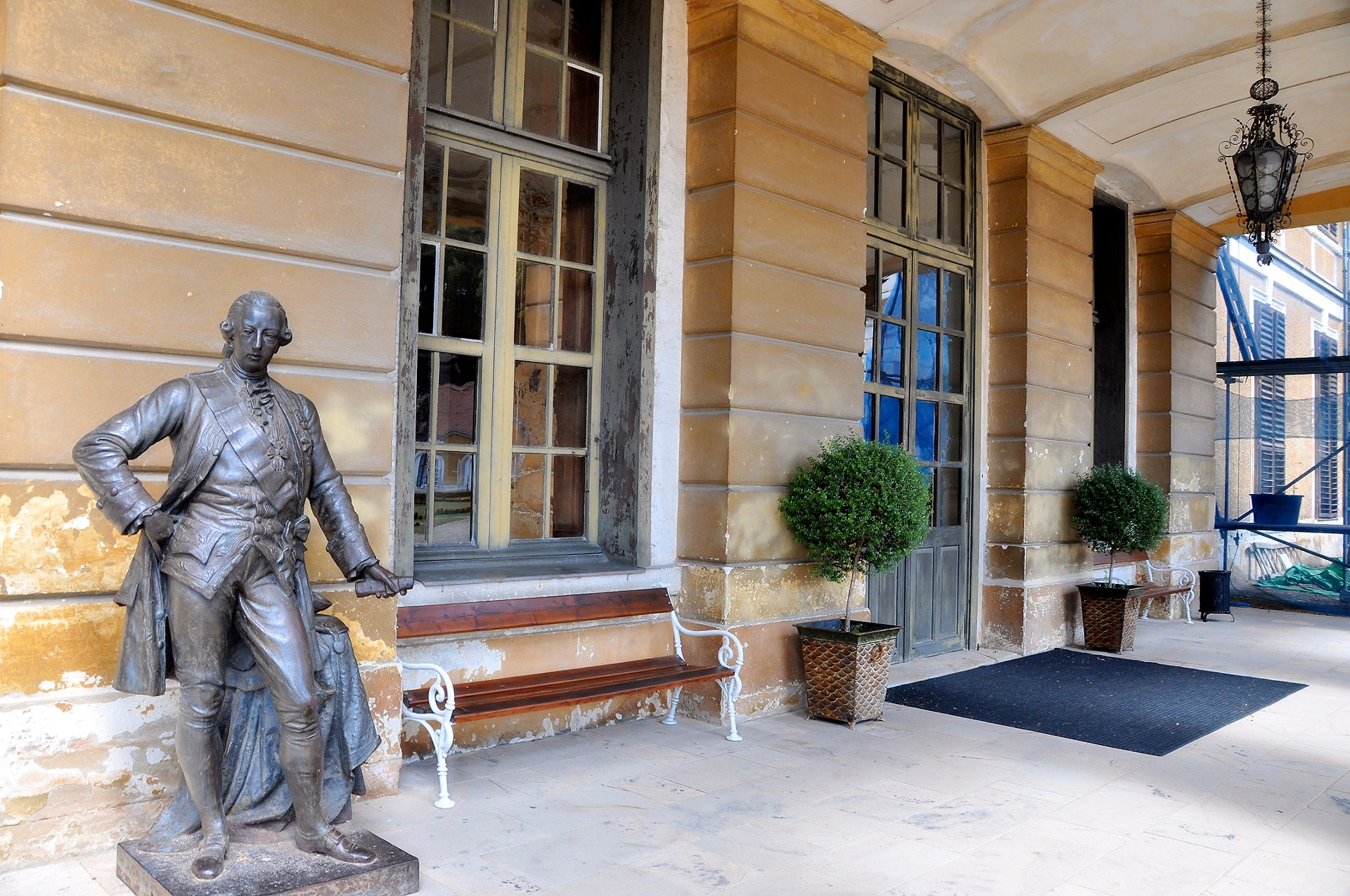

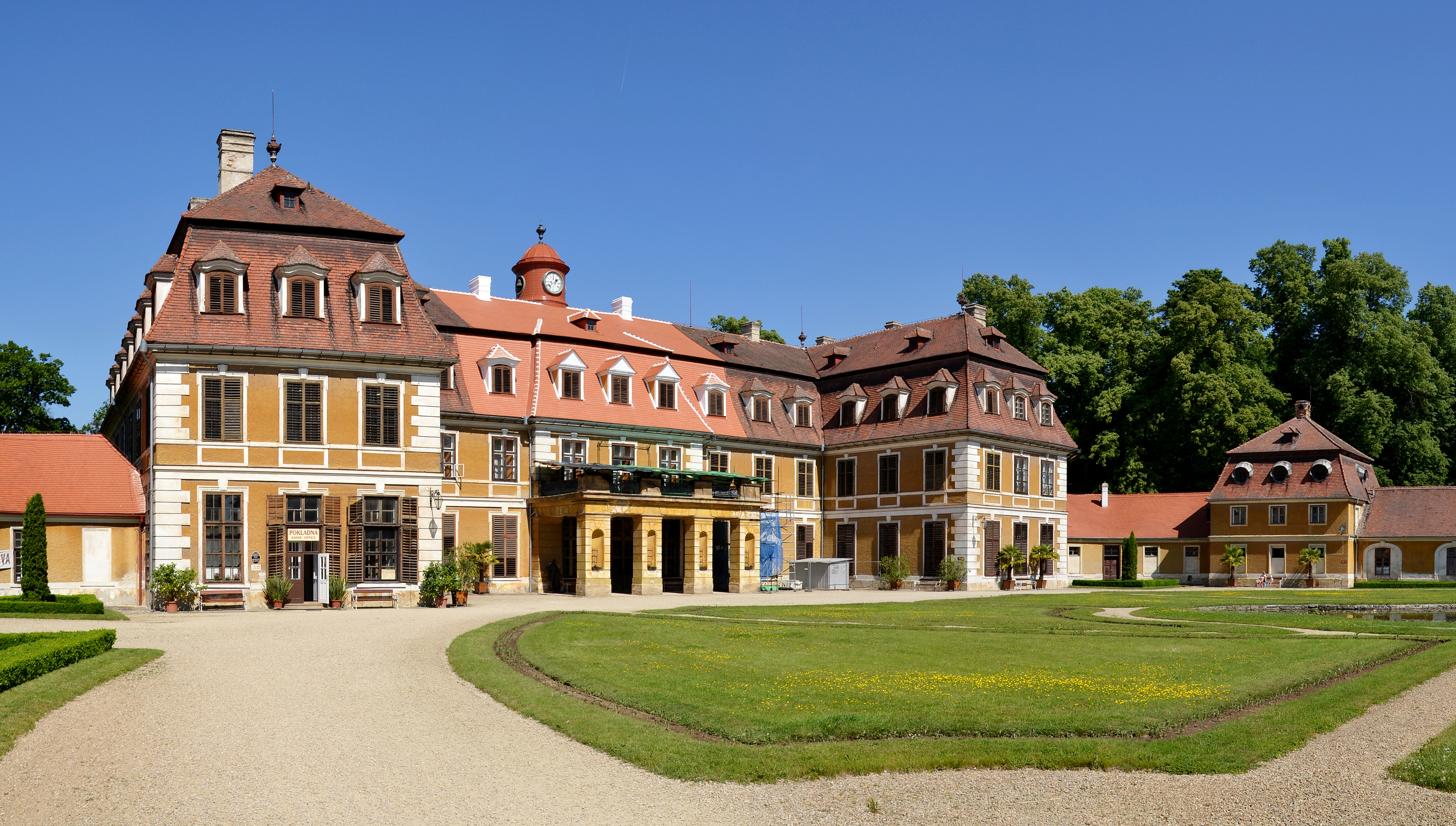

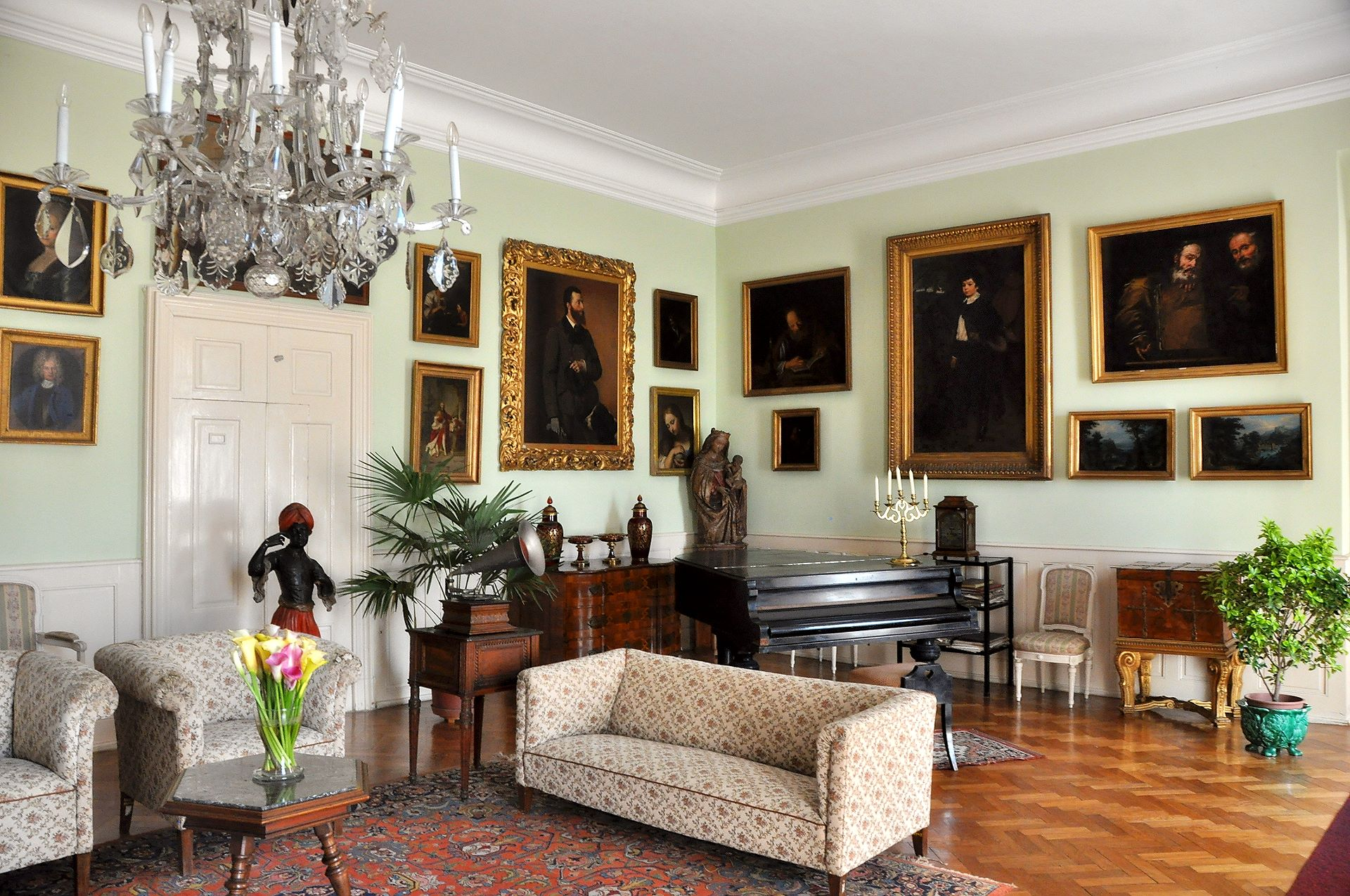

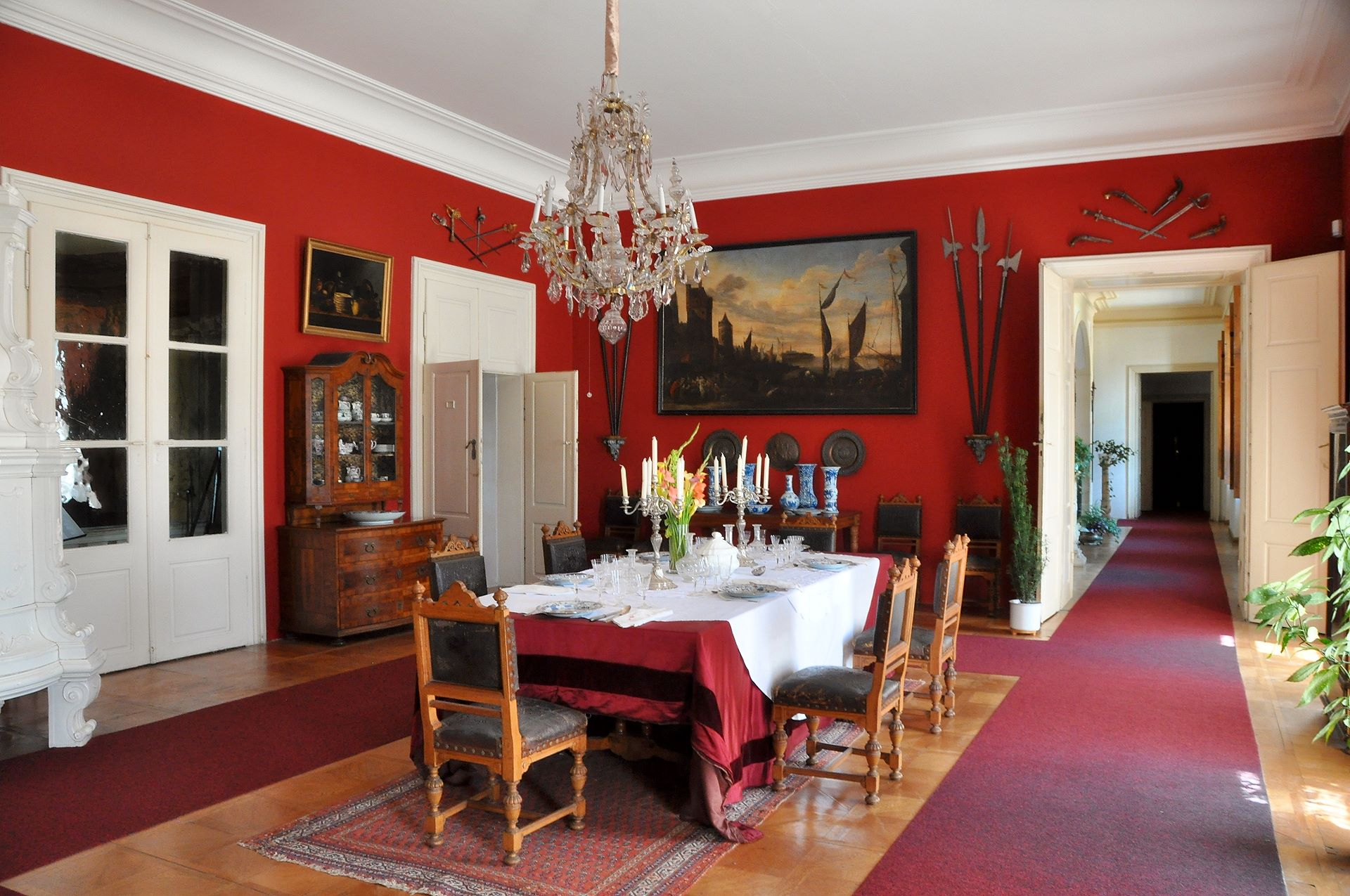

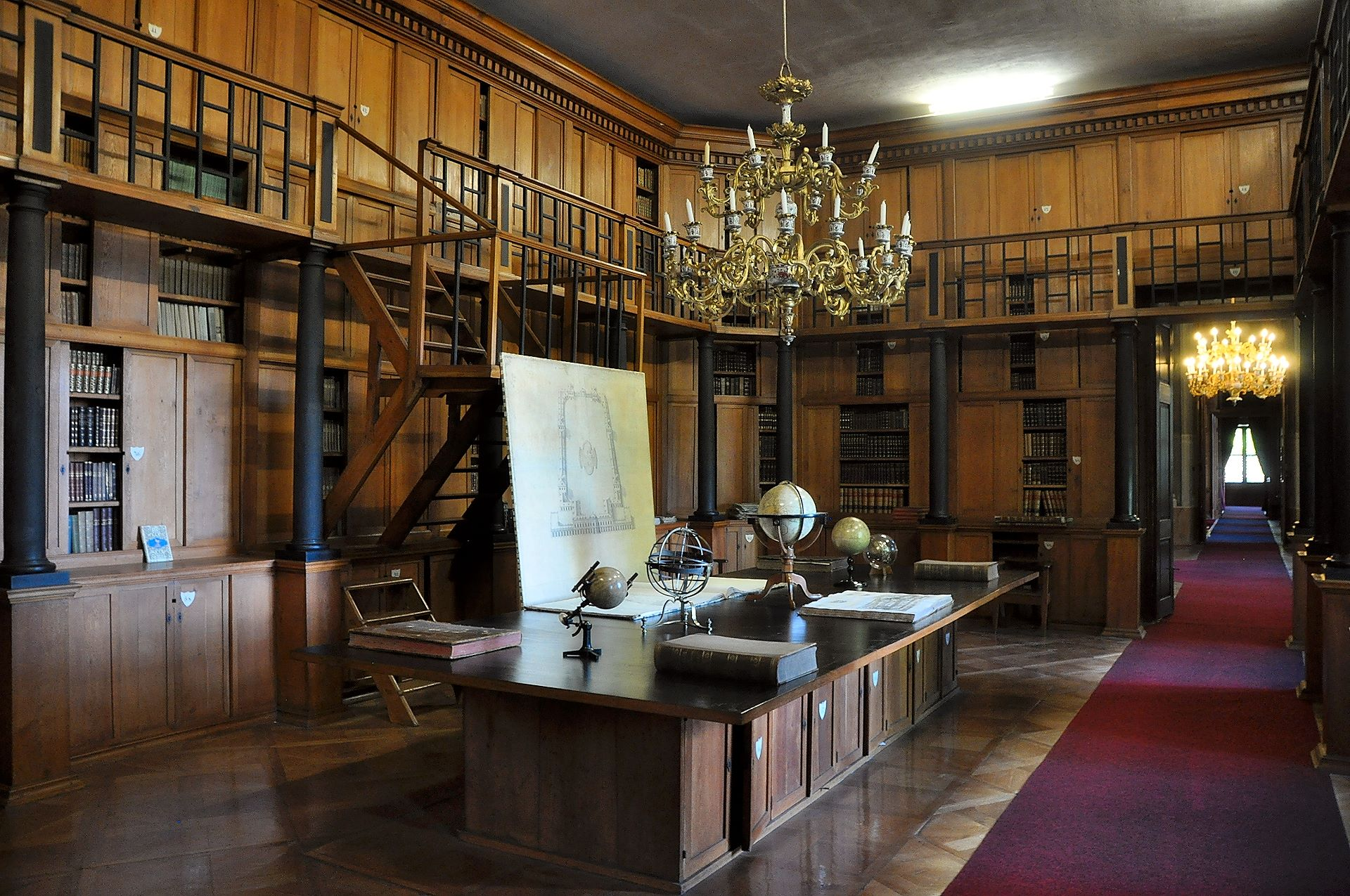
