= Charles Joseph, 1st Prince of Hohenlohe-Jagstberg =

Charles Joseph

Prince of Hohenlohe-Jagstberg
- Reign: 1798–1838 (mediatized in 1806)
- Predecessor: None
- Successor: Ludwig
- Born: 12 December 1766; Bartenstein, Hohenlohe-Bartenstein
- Died: 6 July 1838 (aged 71); Niederstetten
- Spouse: Duchess Henriette of Württemberg (m. 1796; died 1817) Countess Walpurgis von Waldburg-Zeil-Wurzach (m. 1820; died 1823)
- Issue: Princess Maria Frederike; Ludwig, 5th Prince of Hohenlohe-Bartenstein; Princess Sophie; Princess Franziska; Princess Charlotte; Princess Leopoldine; Princess Sophie
Names
- Karl Joseph zu Hohenlohe-Bartenstein-Jagstberg

Charles Joseph, 1st Prince of Hohenlohe-Jagstberg (12 December 1766 – 6 July 1838) was a German prince.

== Early life ==
Hohenlohe was born at Bartenstein in Hohenlohe-Bartenstein on 12 December 1766. He was the second son of Louis Charles, Prince of Hohenlohe-Waldenburg-Bartenstein (1731–1799), and Countess Polyxena Benedikta Josepha Philippine Antonia von Limburg-Stirum (1738–1798). Among his siblings was elder brother, Louis Aloysius, who succeeded their father as the 3rd Prince of Hohenlohe-Bartenstein in 1803.

His paternal grandparents were Charles Philip, Prince of Hohenlohe-Bartenstein, and Sophie Friederike of Hesse-Homburg. His maternal grandparents were Count Christian Otto von Limburg-Stirum and Caroline von Hohenlohe-Waldenburg-Schillingsfürst.

== Career ==
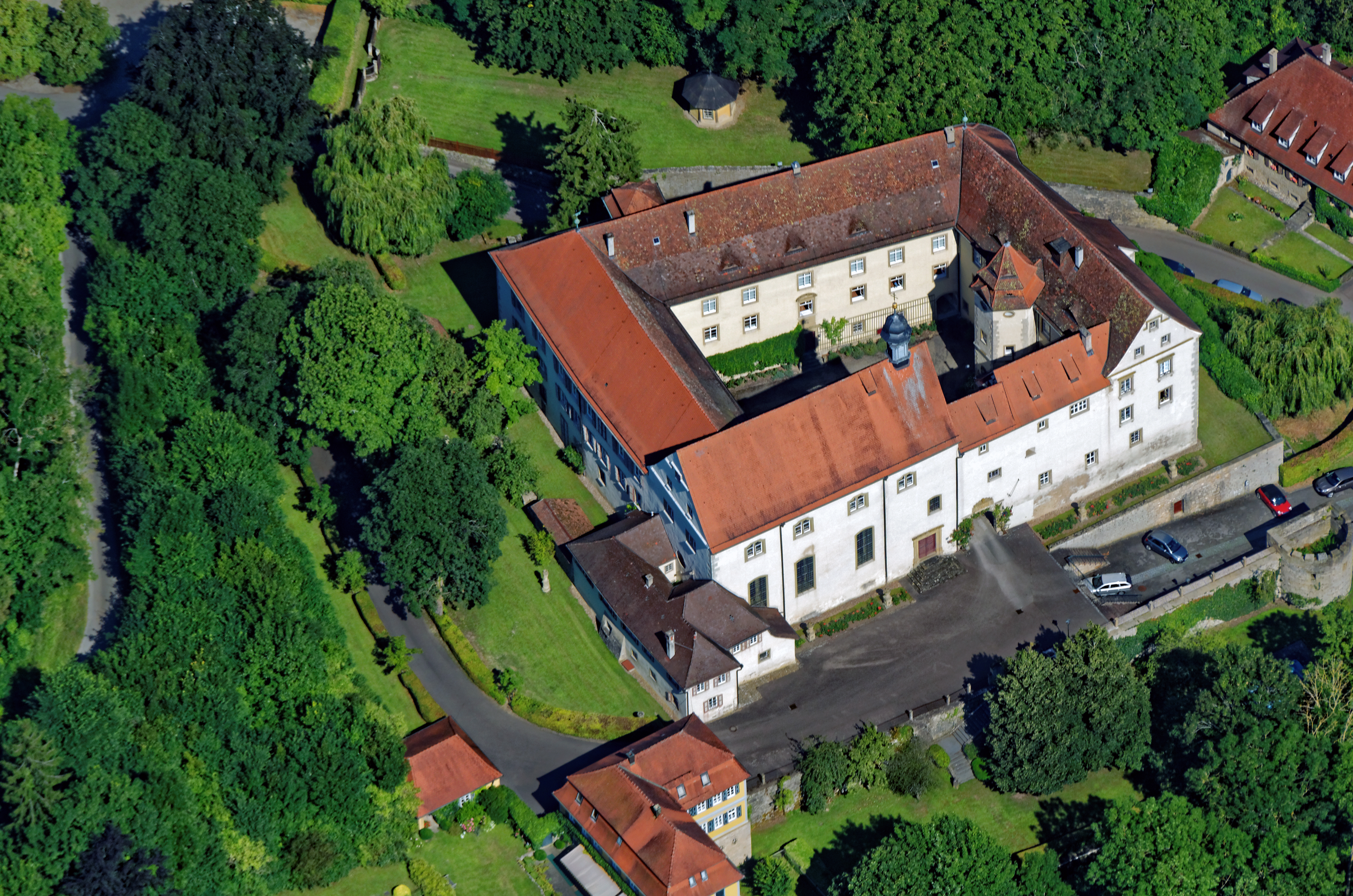
Haltenbergstetten Castle

In 1798, following his father's death, the territory of Hohenlohe-Jagstberg was partitioned out of the Principality of Hohenlohe-Bartenstein, which was then ruled by his elder brother, Louis Aloysius. His territory was elevated as a separate principality at the same time, and, in 1803, he acquired Haltenbergstetten Castle in Niederstetten as its seat. His reign, however, was short-lived, as upon the dissolution of the Holy Roman Empire in 1806, the Imperial State of Hohenlohe-Jagstberg, as well as Hohenlohe-Bartenstein, were both mediatised to the Kingdom of Württemberg.

== Personal life ==
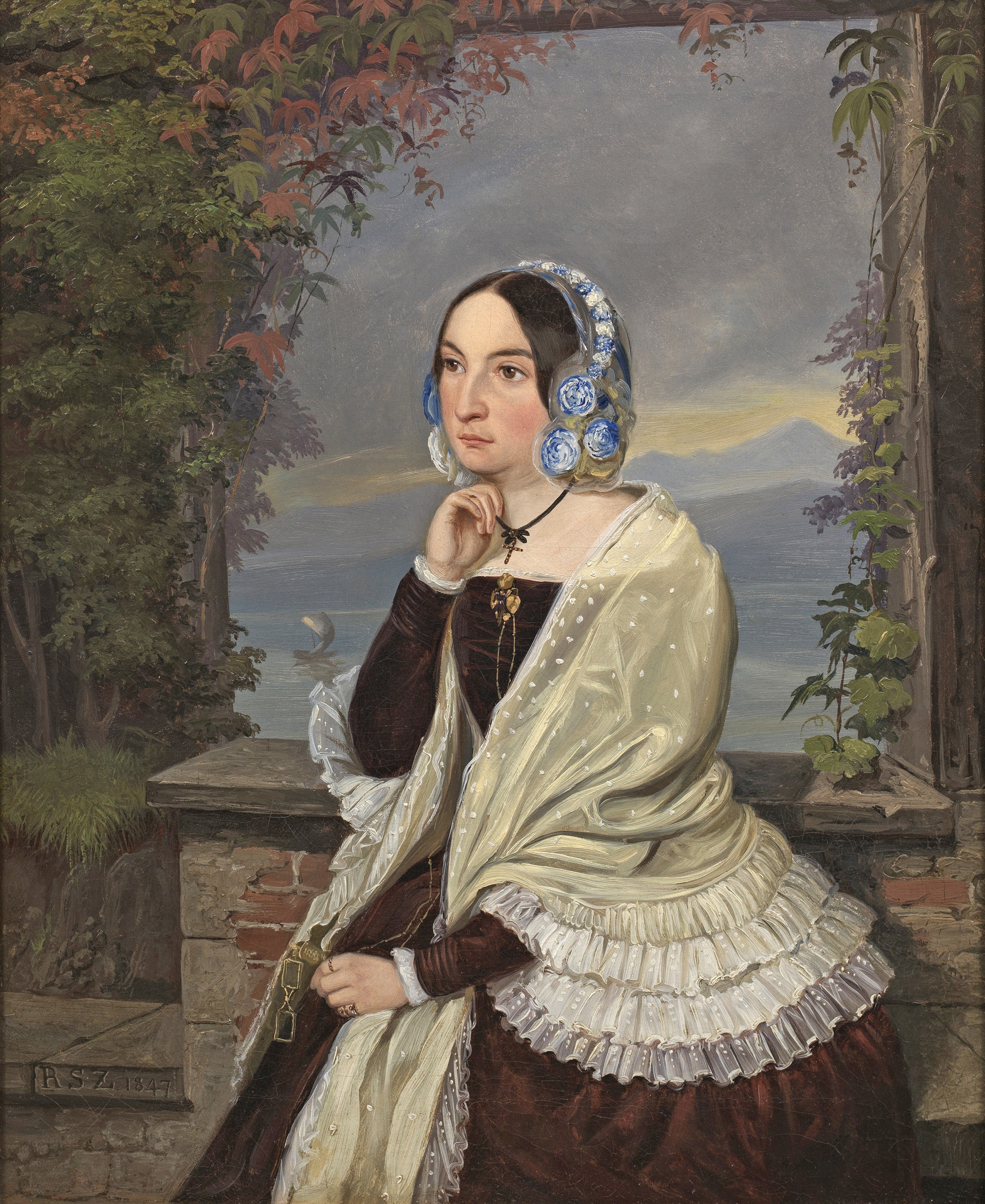
Portrait of his daughter, Princess Charlotte, by Reinhard Sebastian Zimmermann, 1847

On 5 July 1796, Prince Hohenlohe was married to Duchess Henriette Charlotte Friederike of Württemberg (1767–1817), the youngest of three daughters of Louis Eugene, Duke of Württemberg (the reigning Duke of Württemberg from 1793 until his death in 1795) and Countess Sophie Albertine von Beichlingen. Before her death on 23 May 1817, they were the parents of:

- Princess Maria Frederike of Hohenlohe-Bartenstein-Jagtsberg (1798–1848), who died unmarried.
- Ludwig, 5th Prince of Hohenlohe-Bartenstein (1802–1850), who married Princess Henriette of Auersperg, a daughter of Prince Carl of Auersperg (a son of Prince Wilhelm I of Auersperg) and Baroness Auguste von Lenthe.
- Princess Sophie of Hohenlohe-Bartenstein-Jagtsberg (1803–1820), who died young.
- Princess Franziska of Hohenlohe-Bartenstein-Jagtsberg (1807–1873), who married Anton, 2nd Prince Fugger von Babenhausen, son of Prince Anselm Maria Fugger von Babenhausen and Maria Antonia von Waldburg zu Zeil-Wurzach.
- Princess Charlotte of Hohenlohe-Bartenstein-Jagtsberg (1808–1873), who married Konstantin, 2nd Prince of Salm-Reifferscheidt-Krautheim, a son of Franz, 1st Prince of Salm-Reifferscheidt-Krautheim and Princess Franziska Luise of Hohenlohe-Bartenstein.

After Duchess Henriette died at Haltenbergstetten in 1817, he married Countess Maria Walpurgis Katharina von Waldburg-Zeil-Wurzach (1794–1823), a daughter of Hereditary Count Leopold von Waldburg-Zeil-Wurzach and Countess Maria Walburga Franziska Josepha Crescentia Aloysia Raphaela von Kirchberg und Weißenhorn, on 9 July 1820. Before her death in 1823, they were the parents of:

- Princess Leopoldine of Hohenlohe-Bartenstein-Jagtsberg (1821–1862), who died unmarried.
- Princess Sophie of Hohenlohe-Bartenstein-Jagtsberg (1823–1823), who died young.

Prince Hohenlohe died at Haltenbergstetten Castle in Niederstetten on 6 July 1838 and was succeeded as the titular Prince of Hohenlohe-Jagstberg by his son Ludwig. When his nephew, Charles August, Prince of Hohenlohe-Waldenburg-Bartenstein, died in 1844 without male issue, the two former principalities were reunited into one under his son Ludwig. They remained united until 1908 when the title was revived for his great-great-grandson, Albrecht, who was created the Prince of Hohenlohe-Jagstberg. (Note: Albrecht, 5th Prince of Hohenlohe-Jagstberg (1906–1996) was the second son of Johannes, 7th Prince of Hohenlohe-Bartenstein (1863–1921), himself a grandson of Ludwig, 5th Prince of Hohenlohe-Bartenstein. Albrecht's elder brother, Karl, succeeded their father as 8th Prince of Hohenlohe-Bartenstein.) The 1st Prince of Hohenlohe-Jagstberg's widow, Princess Maria, died on 18 July 1841 at Wurzach in Villach-Land District in Carinthia, Austria.

=== Descendants ===
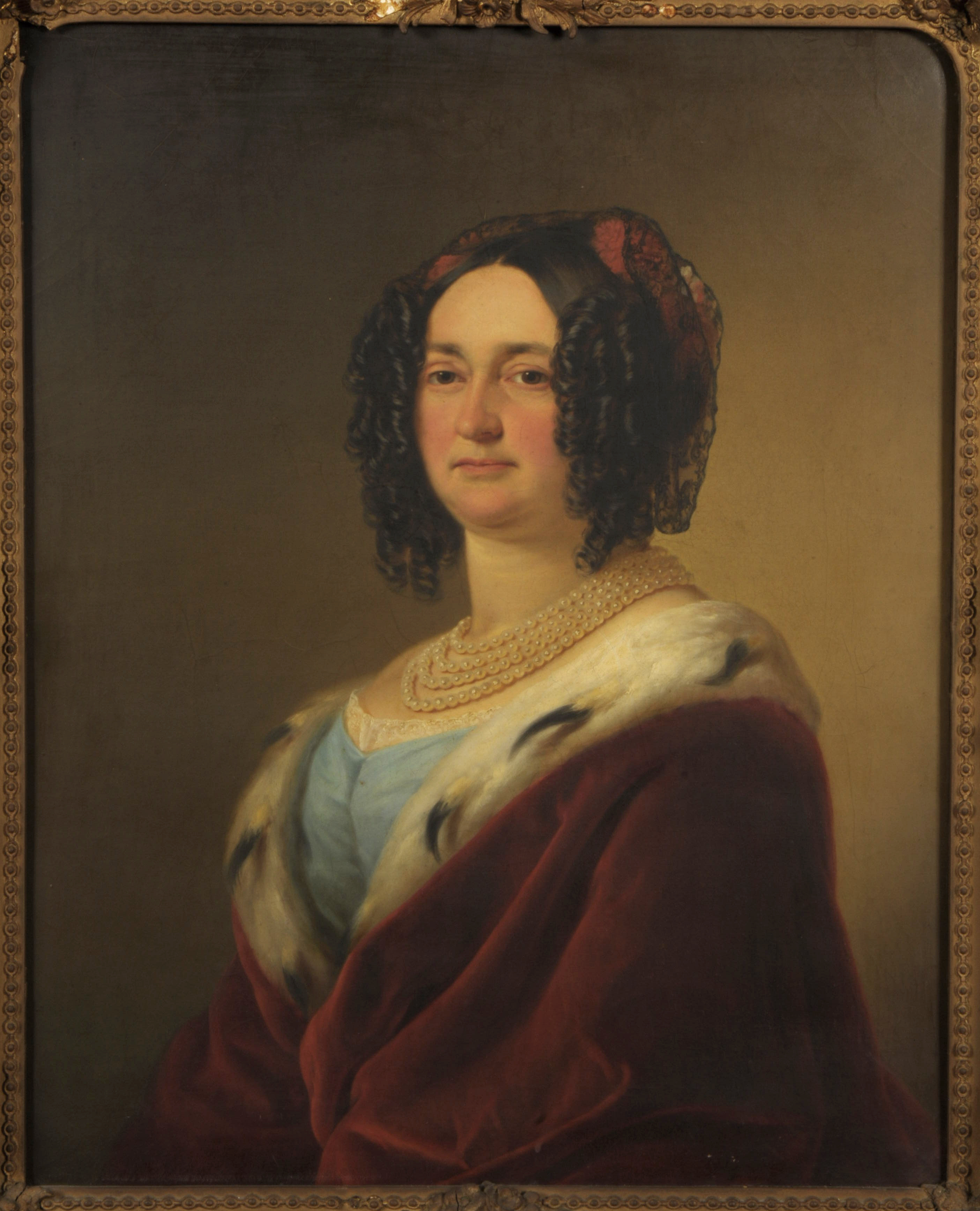
Portrait of his granddaughter, Leopoldina, Princess of Salm-Reifferscheidt-Raitz by Jan Adolf Brandeis

Through his son Prince Ludwig, he was a grandfather of Karl, 6th Prince of Hohenlohe-Bartenstein (1837–1877), who married Countess Rosa von Sternberg; and Prince Albert of Hohenlohe-Bartenstein-Jagtsberg (1844–1898).

Through his daughter Princess Franziska, he was a grandfather of Leopold, 3rd Prince Fugger von Babenhausen; Karl, 4th Prince Fugger von Babenhausen (the father of Karl, 5th Prince Fugger von Babenhausen and Countess Marie Fugger von Babenhausen, who married Count Christoph von Wydenbruck); and Count Frederick Fugger von Babenhausen.

Through his daughter Princess Charlotte, he was a grandfather of Leopold Karl Alois Longin Maria, 4th Prince of Salm-Reiifferscheidt-Dyck (1833–1893) of Schloss Dyck, and Countess Leopoldine of Salm-Reifferscheidt-Krautheim (1805–1878), who married Hugo, 2nd Prince of Salm-Reifferscheidt-Raitz.
