= Ludwig, 5th Prince of Hohenlohe-Bartenstein =

German prince

Ludwig

Prince of Hohenlohe-Waldenburg-Bartenstein
- Reign: 1844–1850
- Predecessor: Karl August
- Successor: Karl

Prince of Hohenlohe-Jagstberg
- Reign: 1838–1850
- Predecessor: Charles Joseph
- Successor: Albert
- Born: 5 June 1802; Bartenstein, Principality of Hohenlohe-Bartenstein
- Died: 22 August 1850 (aged 48); Bartenstein, Kingdom of Württemberg
- Spouse: Princess Henriette Wilhelmine of Auersperg (m. 1835; died 1850)
- Issue: Princess Augusta; Karl, 6th Prince of Hohenlohe-Bartenstein; Princess Luise; Albert, 3rd Prince of Hohenlohe-Jagstberg
Names
- Ludwig Albrecht Konstantin zu Hohenlohe-Waldenburg-Jagstberg-Bartenstein
- Father: Charles Joseph, 1st Prince of Hohenlohe-Jagstberg
- Mother: Duchess Henriette Charlotte Friederike of Württemberg

Ludwig Albrecht Konstantin zu Hohenlohe-Waldenburg-Jagstberg-Bartenstein (5 June 1802 – 22 August 1850) was an officer in the army of the Kingdom of Sardinia in Piedmont and a nobleman of the Kingdom of Württemberg.

== Early life ==
Ludwig was born on 5 June 1802 in Bartenstein. He was the son of Charles Joseph, 1st Prince of Hohenlohe-Jagstberg (1766–1838) and Duchess Henriette Charlotte Friederike of Württemberg (1767–1817). From his parents' marriage, he had four sisters, Princess Maria Frederike, Princess Sophie, Princess Franziska (who married Anton, 2nd Prince Fugger von Babenhausen), and Princess Charlotte (who married Konstantin, 2nd Prince of Salm-Reifferscheidt-Krautheim). After his mother's death in 1817, his father married Countess Walpurgis von Waldburg-Zeil-Wurzach, with whom he had one surviving half-sister, Princess Leopoldine.

His father was the second son of Louis Charles, Prince of Hohenlohe-Waldenburg-Bartenstein, and Countess Polyxena von Limburg-Stirum. His paternal uncle was Louis Aloysius, Prince of Hohenlohe-Waldenburg-Bartenstein. Through his sister Princess Franziska, he was uncle to Karl, 4th Prince Fugger von Babenhausen (the father of Karl, 5th Prince Fugger von Babenhausen and Countess Marie Fugger von Babenhausen, who married Count Christoph von Wydenbruck); and Count Frederick Fugger von Babenhausen. His mother was the youngest of three daughters of Louis Eugene, Duke of Württemberg (the reigning Duke of Württemberg from 1793 until his death in 1795) and Countess Sophie Albertine von Beichlingen.

== Career ==
Hohenlohe-Jagstberg was an officer in the Piedmontese Army and, ultimately, a colonel in the Cavalry.

When his father died on 6 July 1838, he inherited the princely title of the Hohenlohe-Waldenburg-Jagstberg line. On 12 August 1844, he also inherited the title of the Hohenlohe-Waldenburg-Bartenstein line, which passed to him upon the death of his childless first cousin, Karl August, Prince of Hohenlohe-Waldenburg-Bartenstein. Both were titular titles, however, as the Imperial States of Hohenlohe-Jagstberg, as well as Hohenlohe-Bartenstein, were both mediatised to the Kingdom of Württemberg upon the dissolution of the Holy Roman Empire in 1806.

Both titles were linked to a mandate in the Chamber of the Estates of the Regional Estates in Stuttgart. However, the Prince never appeared in person at the sessions of the State Parliament.

== Personal life ==
On 11 January 1835, Prince Ludwig was married to Princess Henriette Wilhelmine of Auersperg (1815–1901), a daughter of Prince Carl of Auersperg (a son of Prince Wilhelm I of Auersperg) and Baroness Auguste von Lenthe. Together, they were the parents of four children:

- Princess Augusta of Hohenlohe-Jagstberg (1836–1842), who died young.
- Karl, 6th Prince of Hohenlohe-Bartenstein (1837–1877), who married Countess Rosa Karoline von Sternberg.
- Princess Luise Caroline Johanna Franziska Marie of Hohenlohe-Jagstberg (1840–1873), who married Count Leopold von Sternberg, General of the Cavalry, in 1863.
- Albert, 3rd Prince of Hohenlohe-Jagstberg (1842–1898), who never married.

Prince Ludwig died at Bartenstein on 22 August 1850. Upon his death in 1850, the estates were split once again into the two lines of Hohenlohe-Waldenburg-Bartenstein and Hohenlohe-Waldenburg-Jagstberg, with his eldest son, Karl, succeeding as the 6th Prince of Hohenlohe-Bartenstein and his younger son, Albert, succeeded as the 3rd Prince of Hohenlohe-Jagstberg. As Albert never married, upon his death in 1898, the titles were again united under his grandson, Johannes, the 4th Prince of Hohenlohe-Jagstberg and 7th Prince of Hohenlohe-Bartenstein (1863–1921). (Note: Upon the death of his grandson, Johannes, 7th Prince of Hohenlohe-Bartenstein, in 1920, the estates were split once again into the two lines of Hohenlohe-Waldenburg-Bartenstein and Hohenlohe-Waldenburg-Jagstberg, with his eldest son, Karl (1905–1950), succeeding as the 8th Prince of Hohenlohe-Bartenstein and his younger son, Albrecht (1906–1996), succeeded as the 5th Prince of Hohenlohe-Jagstberg. The titles remain split to this day, passed down to their respective male heirs.)

== Notes ==
Ludwig, 5th Prince of Hohenlohe-Bartenstein House of Hohenlohe-Bartenstein Cadet branch of the House of Hohenlohe Born: 5 June 1766 Died: 22 August 1850
Regnal titles
Preceded by Charles Joseph	Prince of Hohenlohe-Jagstberg; 6 July 1838 – 22 August 1850	Succeeded by Albert
Preceded by Karl August	Prince of Hohenlohe-Waldenburg-Bartenstein; 12 August 1844 – 22 August 1850	Succeeded by Karl
