= Louis Aloysius, Prince of Hohenlohe-Waldenburg-Bartenstein =

German prince and marshal (1765 - 1829)

Louis Aloysius
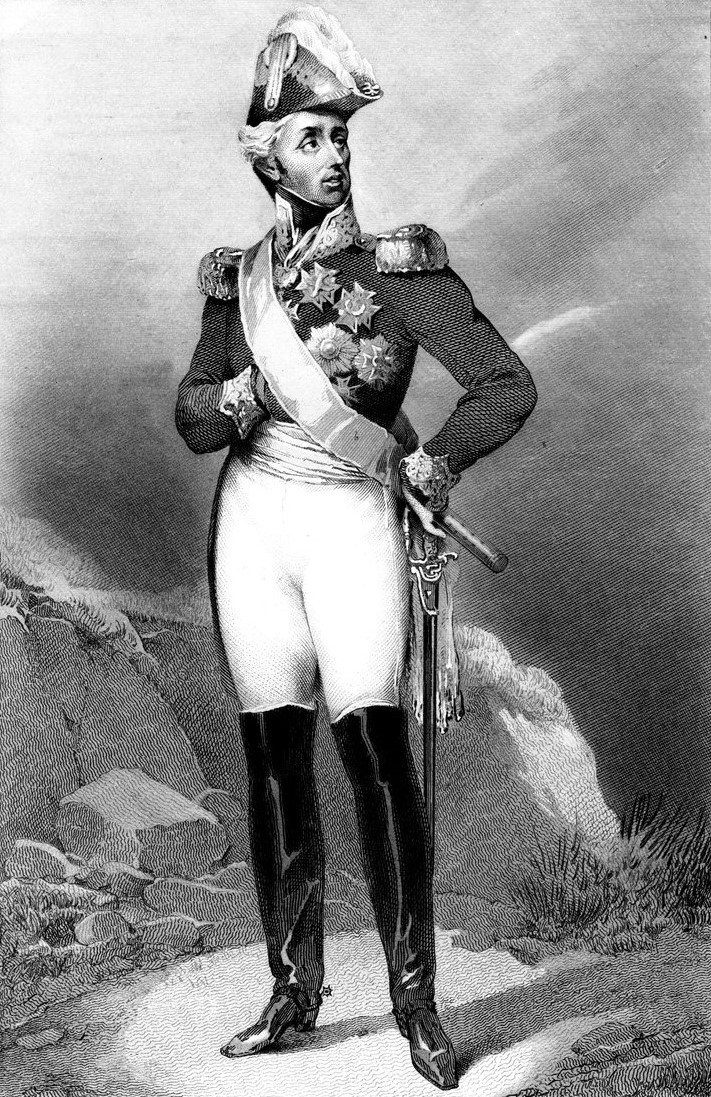

Prince of Hohenlohe-Waldenburg-Bartenstein
- Reign: 14 June 1799 – 30 May 1829
- Predecessor: Louis Charles Francis Leopold
- Successor: Karl August Theodor
- Born: 18 August 1765; Bartenstein, Hohenlohe-Bartenstein
- Died: 30 May 1829 (aged 63); Lunéville, Meurthe-et-Moselle, France
- Spouse: Countess Franziska von Manderscheid-Blankenheim (m. 1786; died 1789) Countess Maria Creszentia of Salm-Reifferscheidt (m. 1790; died 1826)
- Issue: Charles August, Prince of Hohenlohe-Waldenburg-Bartenstein
Names
- Ludwig Aloysius zu Hohenlohe-Waldenburg-Bartenstein
- Father: Louis Charles, Prince of Hohenlohe-Waldenburg-Bartenstein
- Mother: Countess Polyxena von Limburg-Stirum

Louis Aloysius, Prince of Hohenlohe-Waldenburg-Bartenstein (German: Ludwig Aloysius Prinz zu Hohenlohe-Waldenburg-Bartenstein; 18 August 1765 – 30 May 1829) was a German prince and Marshal of France. He commanded a division of Austrian soldiers in the 1809 and 1814 campaigns during the Napoleonic Wars.

== Early life ==
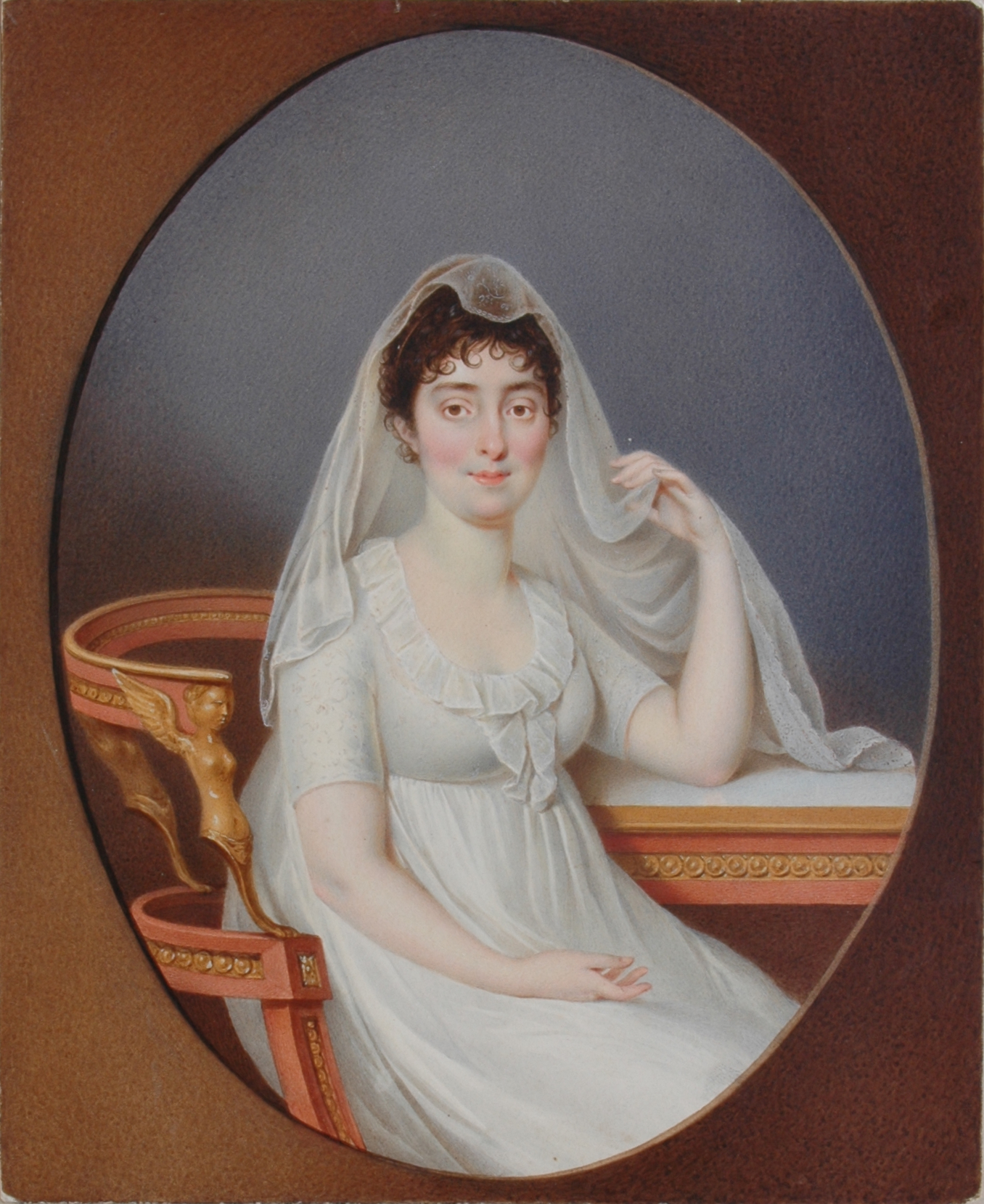
Portrait of his sister, Princess Františka, who married Franz, 1st Prince of Salm-Reifferscheidt-Krautheim

Hohenlohe was born at Bartenstein in Hohenlohe-Bartenstein on 18 August 1765. He was the son of Louis Charles, Prince of Hohenlohe-Waldenburg-Bartenstein (1731–1799), and Countess Polyxena Benedikta Josepha Philippine Antonia von Limburg-Stirum (1738–1798). Among his siblings was younger brother, Charles Joseph, who was created 1st Prince of Hohenlohe-Jagstberg in 1803.

His paternal grandparents were Charles Philip, Prince of Hohenlohe-Bartenstein, and Sophie Friederike of Hesse-Homburg. His maternal grandparents were Count Christian Otto von Limburg-Stirum and Caroline von Hohenlohe-Waldenburg-Schillingsfürst.

== Career ==
In 1784 he entered the service of the Palatinate, which he quit in 1792 to take command as a colonel of a French army regiment raised by his father for the service of the émigré princes of France. He greatly distinguished himself under Condé in the campaigns of 1792–93, especially at the storming of the lines of Wissembourg.

Subsequently he entered the service of the Netherlands, and, when almost surrounded by the army of General Pichegru, conducted a masterly retreat from the island of Bommelerwaard to the Waal. After the Dutch surrendered to the French armies, Hohenlohe joined the Austrian army with whom he fought in the campaigns of 1794 to 1798. The following year he was named major-general by the Archduke Charles of Austria. Hohenlohe was promoted to the rank of Feldmarschallleutnant in 1806 and the next year saw him being appointed governor of Galicia. Napoleon offered to restore to Hohenlohe his principality of Hohenlohe-Bartenstein on condition that he adhered to the Confederation of the Rhine, but as he refused, it was mediatised to Württemberg in 1806.

During the War of the Fifth Coalition Prince Hohenlohe led an Austrian infantry division in the IV Corps under Franz Seraph of Orsini-Rosenberg at the Battle of Eckmühl on 22 April 1809. His division consisted of three battalions each of the Infantry Regiments Josef Mittrowsky Nr. 40, Bellegarde Nr. 44 and Chasteler Nr. 46, the 5th and 6th Battalions of the Archduke Karl Legion and 14 artillery pieces. At the Battle of Aspern-Essling on 21–22 May, he led Infantry Regiments Hiller Nr. 2, Czartorisky Nr. 9, Sztaray Nr. 33 and Reuss-Greitz Nr. 55. His division numbered 9,261 infantry and 16 6-pound cannons, The IV Corps was involved in the murderous struggle for the village of Essling. At the Battle of Wagram on 5–6 July he led the Hiller and Sztaray Regiments, a total of 4,479 men. He commanded a division in Ignaz Gyulai's III Austrian Corps during the 1814 Campaign in France. He led his troops during the First Battle of Bar-sur-Aube

=== Service in France ===
Hohenlohe entered French service with the rank of lieutenant general, after the fall of Napoleon and the restoration of the House of Bourbon in 1814. The following year he held the command of a regiment raised by himself, with which he took part in the Spanish campaign of 1823. The same year he was naturalized a French citizen, upon which he was made a Peer of France. In 1827 was given the distinction of Marshal of France.

== Personal life ==
On 18 November 1786 Prince Hohenlohe married Countess Franziska Wilhelmina Augusta von Manderscheid-Blankenheim (1770–1789), a daughter of Count Johann Wilhelm von Manderscheid-Blankenheim, and Johanna Maximiliane Franziska Ludovika Ottilia von Limburg-Stirum. Before her death in August 1789, they were the parents of one son:

- Charles August Theodore of Hohenlohe-Waldenburg-Bartenstein (1788–1844), who married Landgraviate Clothilde von Hessen-Rotenburg, a daughter of Karl Emanuel, Landgrave of Hesse-Rheinfels-Rotenburg and Princess Leopoldine of Liechtenstein (a daughter of Franz Joseph I, Prince of Liechtenstein), in 1811.

After the death of his first wife, the Prince married Countess Maria Creszentia Sabina Raphaela of Salm-Reifferscheidt (1768–1826), a daughter of Count Siegmund of Salm-Reifferscheidt and Countess Eleonore von Waldburg zu Zeil und Wurzach, on 19 January 1790. Together, they were the parents of two daughters:

- Countess Maria Beatrix de Hohenlohe-Bartenstein (1791–1792), who died young.
- Countess Augusta Charlotte de Hohenlohe-Bartenstein (b. 1793), who died young.

Prince Hohenlohe died at Lunéville in 1829.
