= Hohenlohe-Bartenstein =

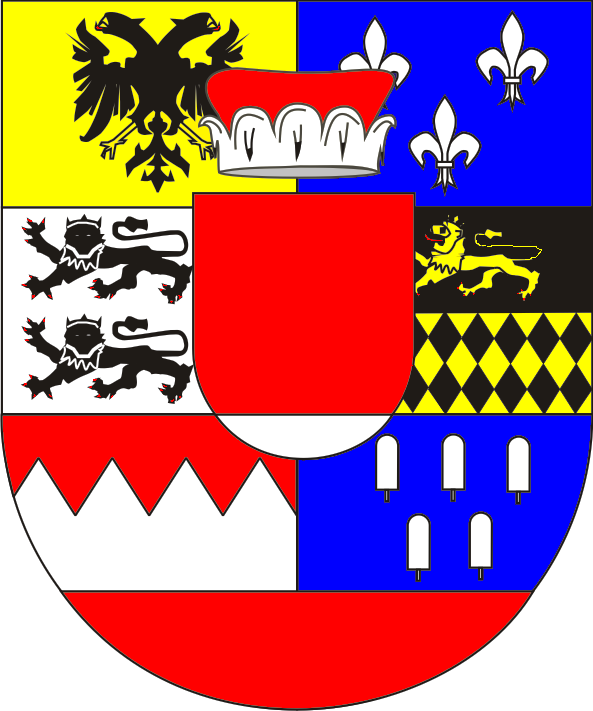
Coat of arms of Hohenlohe-Bartenstein

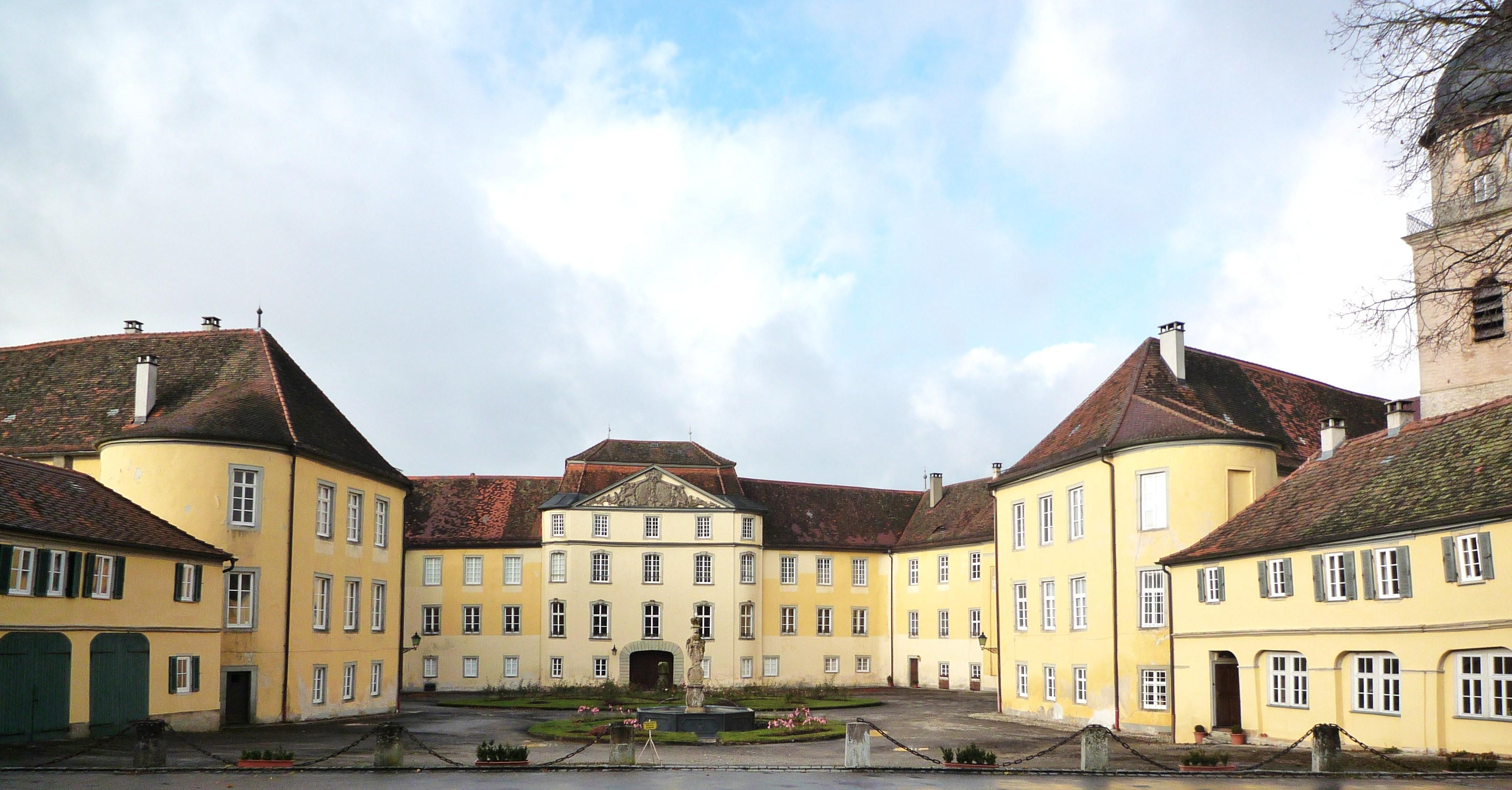
Bartenstein Castle near Schrozberg

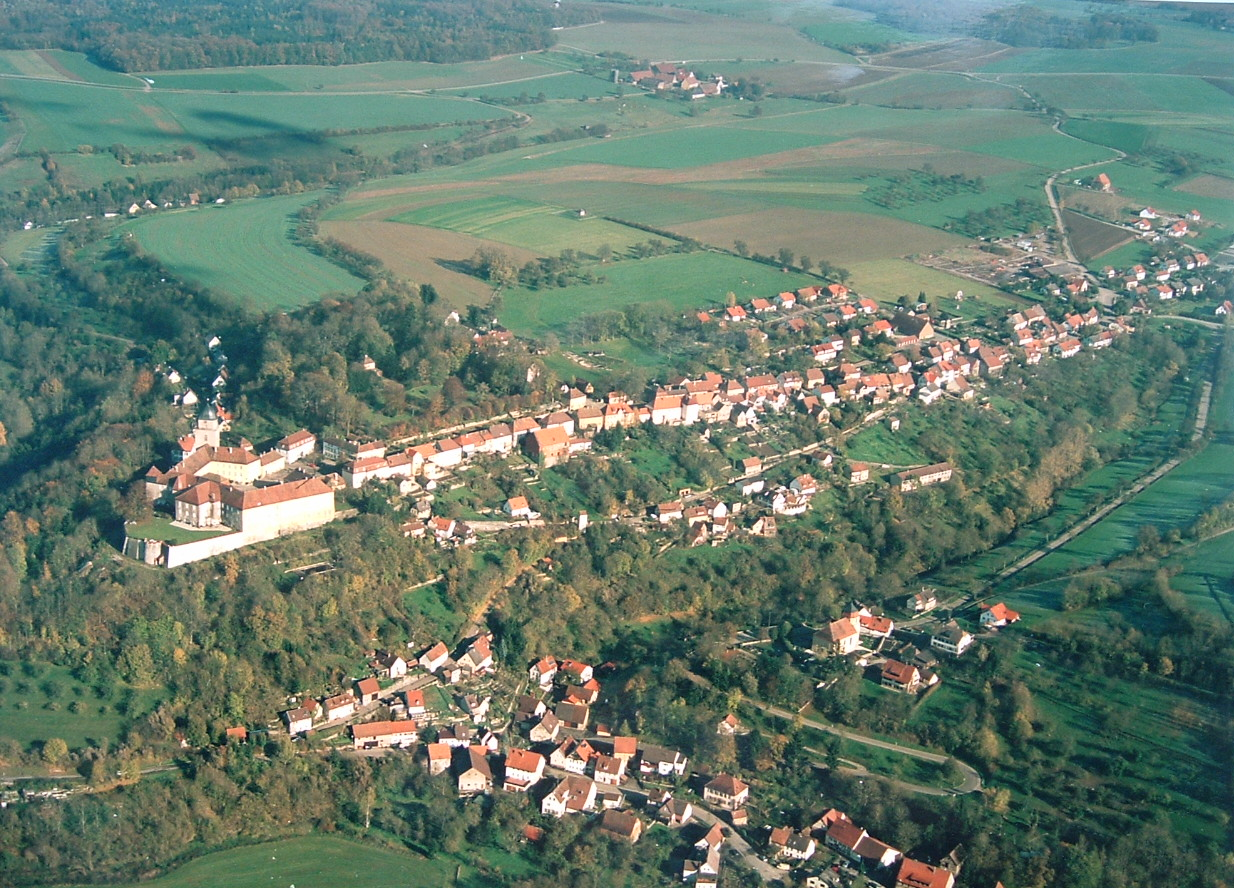
Bartenstein

Hohenlohe-Bartenstein was a German principality of the House of Hohenlohe, located in northeastern Baden-Württemberg, Germany, around Bartenstein.

Hohenlohe-Bartenstein was a partition of Hohenlohe-Schillingsfürst and was raised from a county to a principality in 1744. Hohenlohe-Bartenstein was partitioned between itself and Hohenlohe-Jagstberg in 1798, and was mediatised to Württemberg in 1806.

== Counts of Hohenlohe-Bartenstein (1688–1744) ==
- Philip Charles Casper (Count of Hohenlohe-Schillingsfürst) (1688–1729)
- Charles Philip Francis (1729–1744) with...
- Joseph Anthony (1729–1744)

== Princes of Hohenlohe-Bartenstein ==
- Philip Charles Casper, Count 1688-1729 (1668-1729)
  - Charles Philip Francis, 1st Prince 1744-1763 (1702–1763)
    - Louis Charles Francis Leopold, 2nd Prince 1763–1798 (1731-1799)
      - Louis Aloysius, 3rd Prince 1799-1827, mediatized 1806 (1765–1827)
        - Karl August Theodor, 4th Prince 1827-1844 (1788-1844)
      - Karl Joseph, 1st Prince of Hohenlohe-Jagstberg 1803-1838 (1766-1838)
        - Ludwig, 2nd Prince of Hohenlohe-Jagstberg, 5th Prince 1844-1850 (1802-1850)
          - Karl, 3rd Prince of Hohenlohe-Jagstberg, 6th Prince 1850-1877 (1837-1877)
            - Johannes, 4th Prince of Hohenlohe-Jagstberg, 7th Prince 1877-1921 (1863-1921)
              - Karl, 8th Prince 1921-1950 (1905-1950)
                - Ferdinand, 9th Prince 1950-2019 (1942-2019)
                  - Maximilian, 10th Prince 2019-present (born 1972)
                    - Princess Maria Carolina of Hohenlohe-Bartenstein (born 2015)
                  - Prince Felix of Hohenlohe-Bartenstein (born 1973)
                    - Princess Alejandra of Hohenlohe-Bartenstein (born 2012)
                    - Prince Johannes of Hohenlohe-Bartenstein (born 2014)
              - Albrecht, 5th Prince of Hohenlohe-Jagstberg 1921-1996 (1906-1996)
                - Alexander, 6th Prince of Hohenlohe-Jagstberg 1966-present (born 1937)
                  - Karl, Hereditary Prince of Hohenlohe-Jagstberg (born 1967)
                    - Prince Karl of Hohenlohe-Jagstberg (born 2007)
                - Prince Johannes of Hohenlohe-Jagstberg, Count of Mirbach-Geldern-Egmont 1982-present (born 1939)
                  - Prince Lamoral of Hohenlohe-Jagstberg (born 1973)
  - Joseph Anton, Prince of Hohenlohe-Bartenstein-Pfedelbach 1744–1764 (1707-1764)
