= Theodore Wores =

American painter (1859–1939)

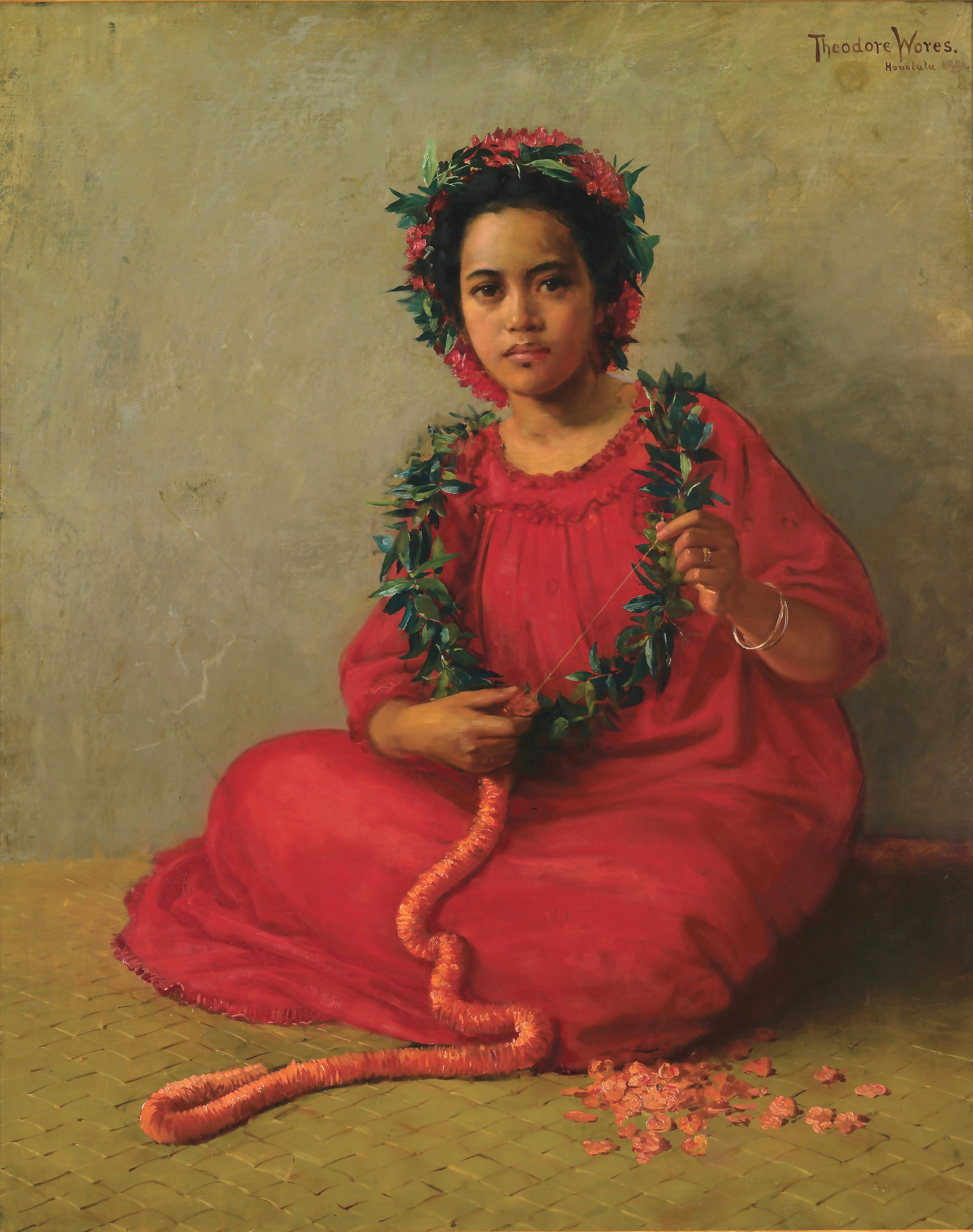
The Lei Maker, oil on canvas painting by Theodore Wores, 1901, Honolulu Museum of Art

Theodore Wores (August 1, 1859 – September 11, 1939) was an American painter. He was from San Francisco, and travelled extensively including periods in Germany, Japan, Hawaii, and Samoa.

== Life ==
Theodore Wores was born on August 1, 1859, in San Francisco, son of Joseph Wores and Gertrude Liebke. His father worked as a hat manufacturer in San Francisco.

Wores began his art training at age twelve in the studio of Joseph Harrington, who taught him color, composition, drawing and perspective. When the California School of Design (later known as San Francisco Art Institute) opened in 1874, Wores was one of the first pupils to enroll. After one year at that school under the landscape painter Virgil Macey Williams, he continued his art education at the Royal Academy in Munich where he spent six years. He also painted with William Merritt Chase and Frank Duveneck. Wores returned to San Francisco in 1881. He went to Japan for two extended visits and had successful exhibitions of his Japanese paintings in New York City and London, where he became friends with James Abbott McNeill Whistler and Oscar Wilde.

He visited Hawaii and Samoa in 1901 to 1902 and established a home in San Francisco about 1906. He visited Hawaii for a second time in 1910 to 1911. He was married in 1910, in San Francisco to Carolyn Bauer. For the remainder of his career, Wores painted the coast on the western edge of San Francisco. He died from a heart attack in San Francisco on September 11, 1939.

== Collections ==
His most famous work is The Lei Maker, which is on permanent display at the Honolulu Museum of Art. The Addison Gallery of American Art (Andover, Massachusetts), the Crocker Art Museum (Sacramento, California), the Smithsonian American Art Museum (Washington, DC), and the White House (Washington, DC), are among the public collections that also hold works by Wores.

== Works ==
- 1900 - Custom House, Monterey, oil on pressboard, Shasta State Historic Park, Shasta County, California
- 1901 - Hawaiian House, oil on canvas
- 1901 - The Lei Maker, oil on canvas, Honolulu Museum of Art, Honolulu, Hawaii
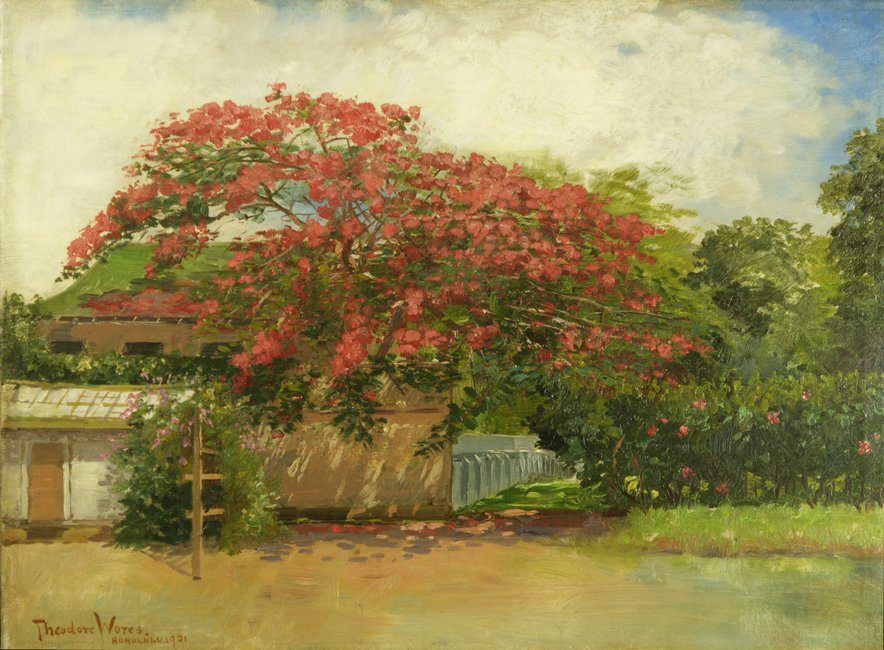
Hawaiian House (1901) oil on canvas painting by Theodore Wores

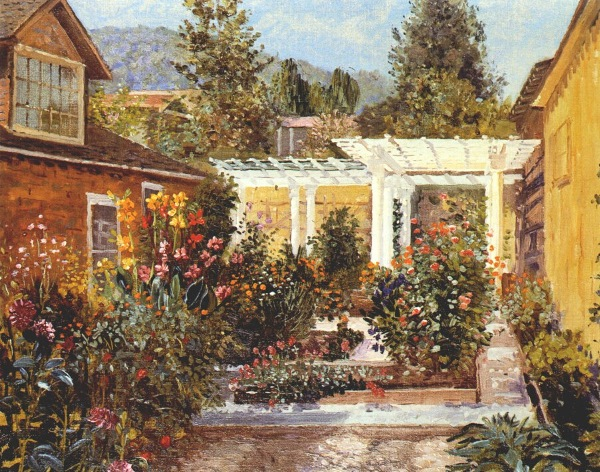
House and Garden, Saratoga

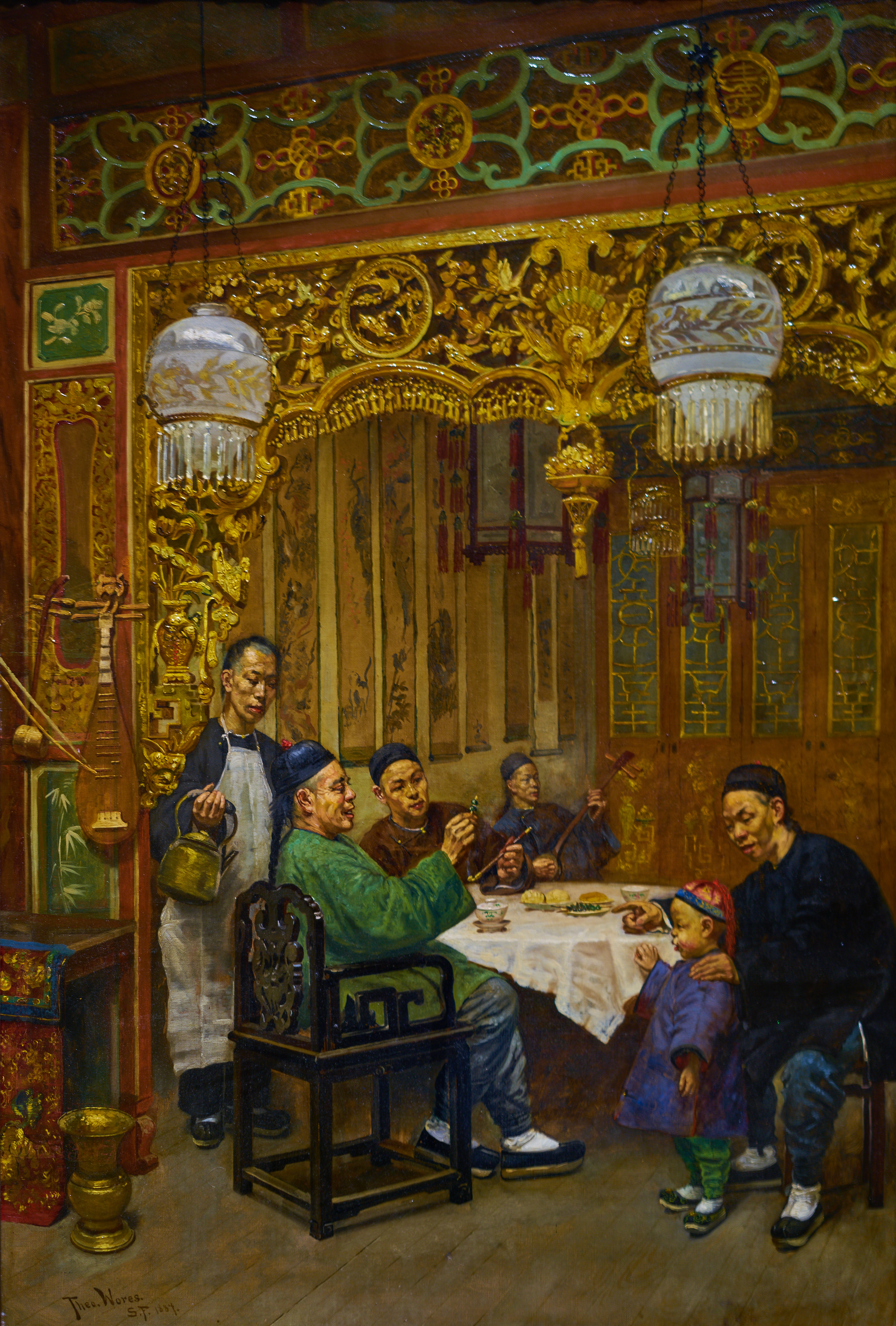
Chinese Restaurant, (1884) oil on canvas, Crocker Art Museum
