= Hohenlohe Regiment =

French military unit

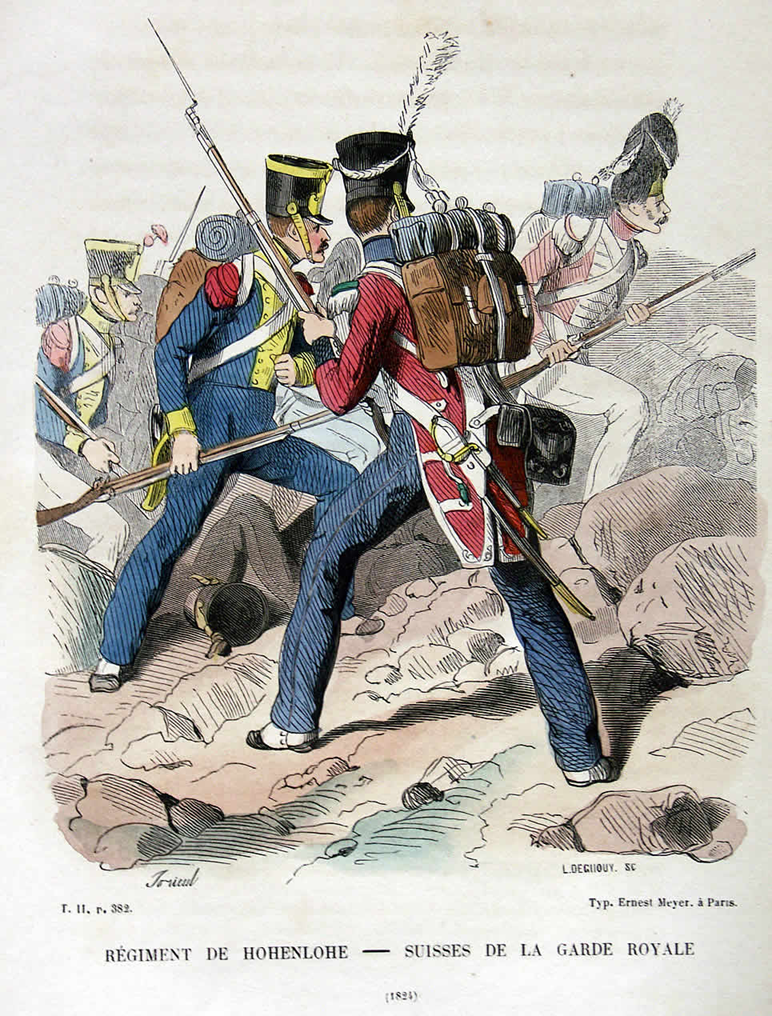
- Uniforms of the Regiment de Hohenlohe (blue at left) and Swiss soldiers of the Royal Guard (red at right) in the late 1820s.
- Active: September 6, 1815–January 5, 1831
- Disbanded: January 5, 1831
- Country: France
- Allegiance: (France) Bourbon Restoration (France) July Monarchy
- Branch: French Army
- Type: Light Infantry
- Role: Chasseur
- Patron: Louis Aloysius, Prince of Hohenlohe-Waldenburg-Bartenstein
- Campaigns: Spanish expedition

Commanders
- First Commander and Founder: Louis Aloysius, Prince of Hohenlohe-Waldenburg-Bartenstein
- Later Commander: Pozzo di Borgo

The Hohenlohe Regiment (Régiment de Hohenlohe) was an infantry regiment of the French Army established after the abdication of Napoleon I. It consisted of foreign soldiers who wished to continue in French service under the restored monarchy. The regiment was raised, named after and commanded by Louis Aloysius, Prince of Hohenlohe-Waldenburg-Bartenstein, a German prince and Marshal of France.

== History ==
The Hohenlohe Regiment was established on September 6, 1815. Upon its formation, it was known as Légion royale étrangère and was composed of the consolidated elements of eight foreign regiments that had been raised during the Hundred Days, but which had been disbanded following the abdication of Napoleon I. While foreigners in French service had historically been grouped into specific national units (Swiss, German, Irish etc.) the newly created regiment was a mixed force. The bulk of its rank and file were however from the various German states of the period.

In February 1821, it was renamed the Régiment de Hohenlohe after its founder and then commanding officer Colonel-Prince Louis Aloysius de Hohenlohe. The Hohenlohe Regiment participated in the French intervention in Spain of 1823 as part of Colonel-Prince Hohenlohe's 4th Corps of the Armée des Pyrénées. In 1829, the namesake of the regiment, Colonel Hohenlohe, died.

Other than during the French intervention in Spain, the Hohenlohe Regiment's service was largely uneventful as they were primarily used as a garrison force in various provincial towns around France. This was in marked contrast to the service of the other notable foreign regiments of the era: detachments of Swiss Guards had traditionally been stationed at Versailles as part of the Maison du Roi — with the bulk of the Regiment of Swiss Guards garrisoned just outside Paris for the purpose of maintaining royal authority in the city. Swiss regiments continued to perform this role under the restored Bourbon kings. With the Swiss troops occupying such a high-profile role enforcing the authority of the Bourbon kings, the Hohenlohe Regiment largely escaped the notice of the Provisional Government during the July Revolution. While their counterparts in the Swiss regiments were disbanded by order of the government on August 14, 1830, the Hohenlohe Regiment, stationed in the port city of Marseille far from the Paris events of July 1830, escaped this immediate fate.

This relative isolation did not last for long, as the newly established July Monarchy intended to honor the constitutional prohibition forbidding the use of foreign mercenaries on French soil. As result, on December 12, 1830, the regiment received orders to prepare to be deployed to Greece in the vicinity of Patras to support the Morea Expedition, a French interventionist effort supporting the Greek independence movement. On January 5, 1831, however, the Hohenlohe Regiment received orders to disband from King Louis Phillippe. Those members of the regiment who wished to continue to serve in the French army were transferred into the 21st Line Infantry Regiment.

== Legacy ==
As an infantry regiment composed of foreigners, the Hohenlohe Regiment constituted one of the forebears of the French Foreign Legion. An immediate legacy was passed onto the Foreign Legion in the form of some of the Hohenlohe Regiment's commissioned and non-commissioned officer cadre, who were credited with forming the newly raised Legion into a functional fighting force. In its original form, the Legion's 1st and 2nd Battalions were composed of veterans of the former Swiss regiments and the Hohenlohe Regiment. The distinctive slow-stepping parade march of the modern Foreign Legion is reportedly traceable to that of the Hohenlohe and Swiss regiments prior to 1830.
