= Niederstetten =

- Town
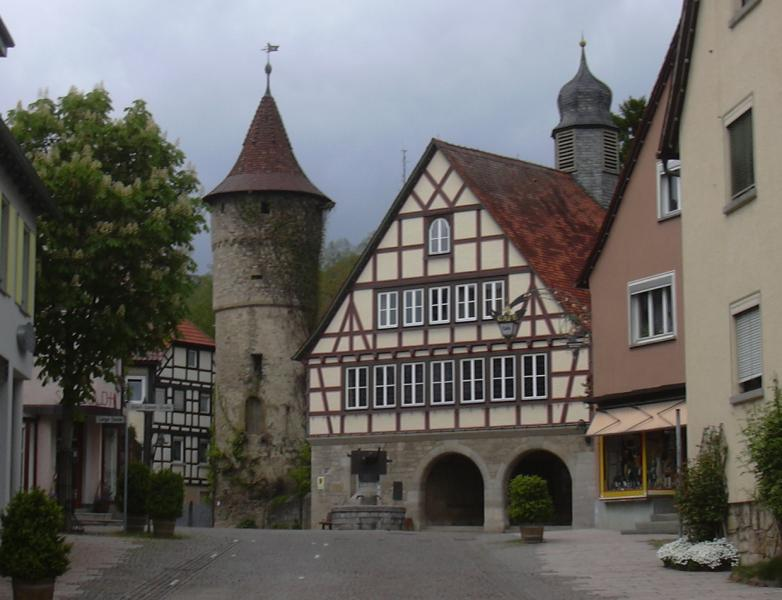
- Town hall

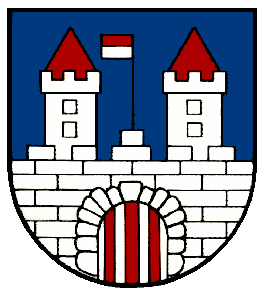
- Coat of arms

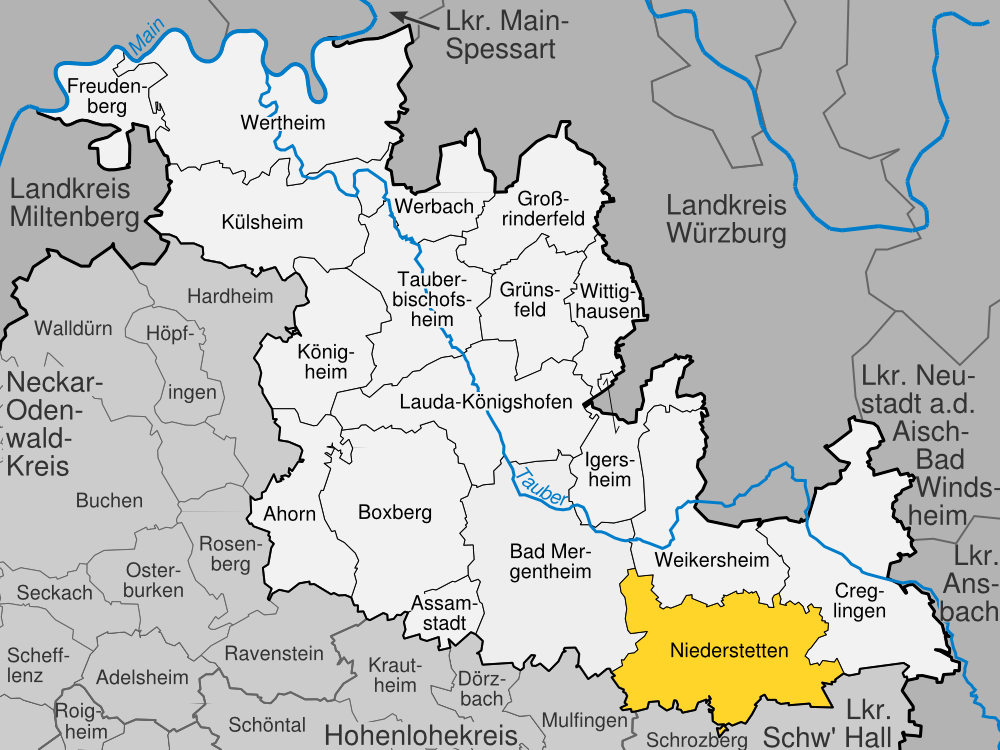
- Location of Niederstetten within Main-Tauber-Kreis district
- Interactive map of Niederstetten
- Location within Germany Location within Baden-Württemberg
- Coordinates: 49°24′03″N 09°55′05″E
- Country: Germany
- State: Baden-Württemberg
- Admin. region: Stuttgart
- District: Main-Tauber-Kreis

Government
  - Mayor (2018–26): Heike Naber

Area
  - Total: 104.05 km^{2} (40.17 sq mi)
- Elevation: 306 m (1,004 ft)

Population (2025-12-31)
  - Total: 4,874
  - Density: 46.84/km^{2} (121.3/sq mi)
- Time zone: UTC+01:00 (CET)
  - Summer (DST): UTC+02:00 (CEST)
- Postal codes: 97996, 97980 (Mönchshof)
- Dialling codes: 07932, 07933, 07939 (Heimberg)
- Vehicle registration: TBB, MGH
- Website: www.niederstetten.de

Niederstetten (German: [niːdɐˈʃtɛtn̩]) is a town and a municipality in the Main-Tauber district, in Baden-Württemberg, Germany. It is situated 14 km southeast of Bad Mergentheim, and 19 km west of Rothenburg ob der Tauber.

== Sights ==
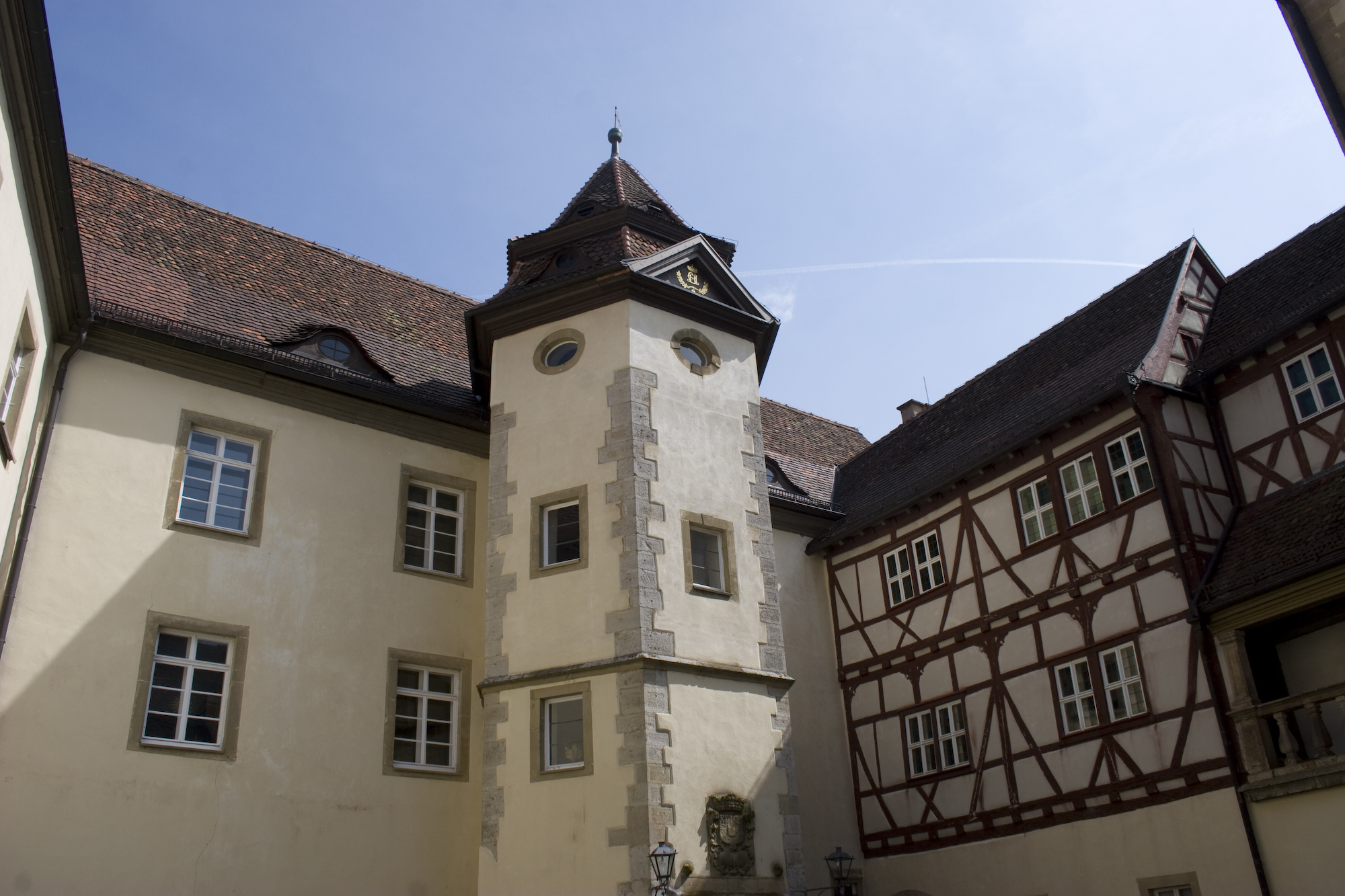
Inner courtyard of Haltenbergstetten Castle

The main attraction is Haltenbergstetten Castle, first built around 1200 by the House of Hohenlohe. The lands of Haltenbergstetten probably originally belonged to Pfitzingen Castle, which was located in a neighboring village. Conrad of Pfitzingen, who was already mentioned in documents in 1136/1141, was probably the father of Konrad of Weikersheim, the progenitor of the House of Hohenlohe, first mentioned in 1153.

Haltenbergstetten Castle was enlarged around a courtyard in the 16th century. Through feudal changes of ownership in the Middle Ages and later through inheritance, the castle was later owned by the Counts of Castell, the Counts of Limpurg, the Lords of Rosenberg, the Counts of Hatzfeld (1641–1794), the Bishopric of Würzburg and, from 1803, by the Princes of Hohenlohe-Jagstberg who still own and inhabit it today.

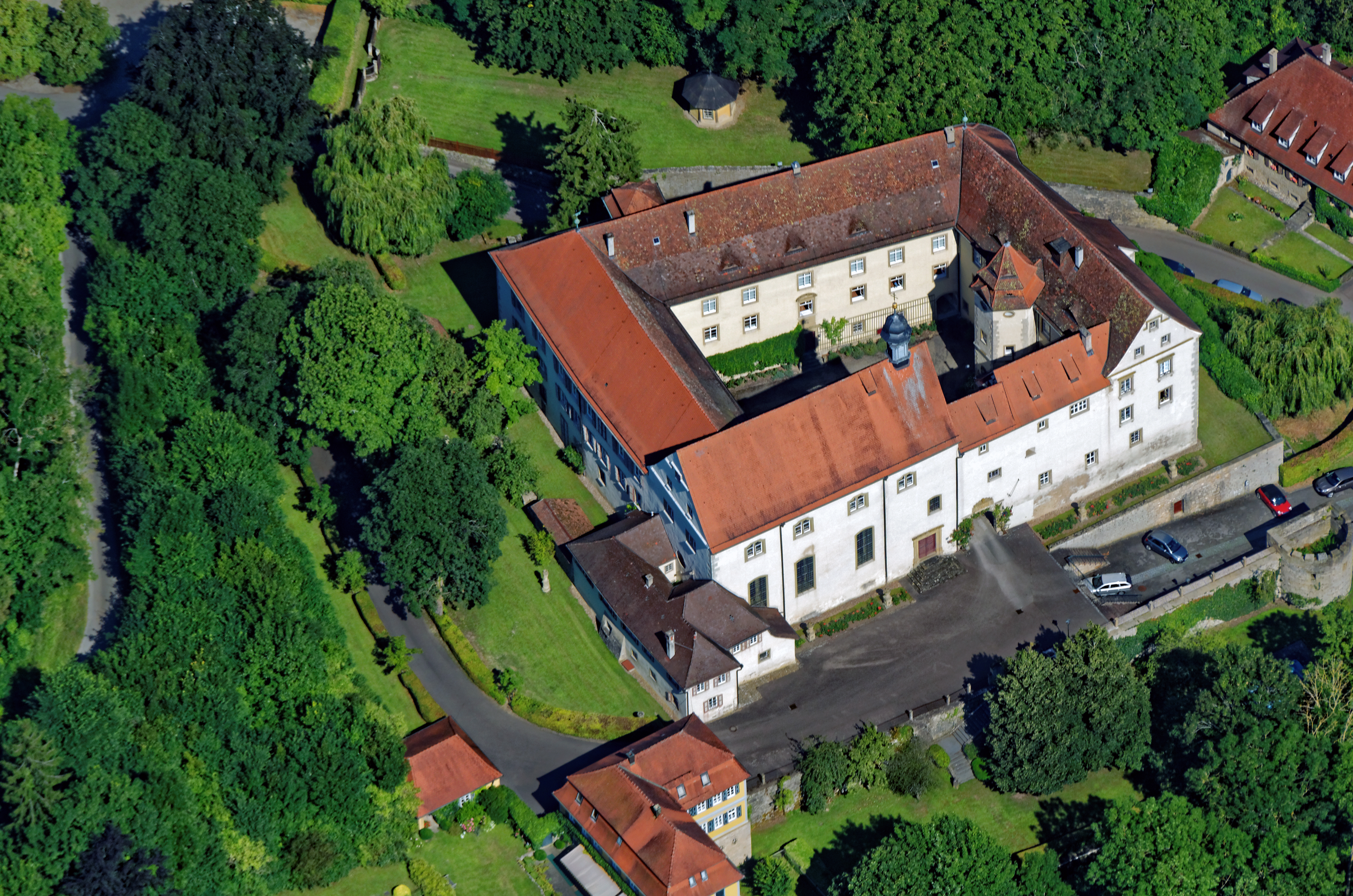
Haltenbergstetten Castle

== Museum ==
The Albert-Sammt-Zeppelin-Museum is in memory of last German airship captain Albert Sammt and shows original parts as well as documents of Zeppelin history.

== Economy, industry and infrastructure ==
=== Military ===
Niederstetten is home to German Army Aviation Transport Helicopter Regiment 30 based at Niederstetten Air Base.

== International relations ==
Niederstetten is twinned with:

- Le Plessis-Bouchard (France).
