= Haltenbergstetten Castle =

Coordinates: 49.3983°N 9.9155°E

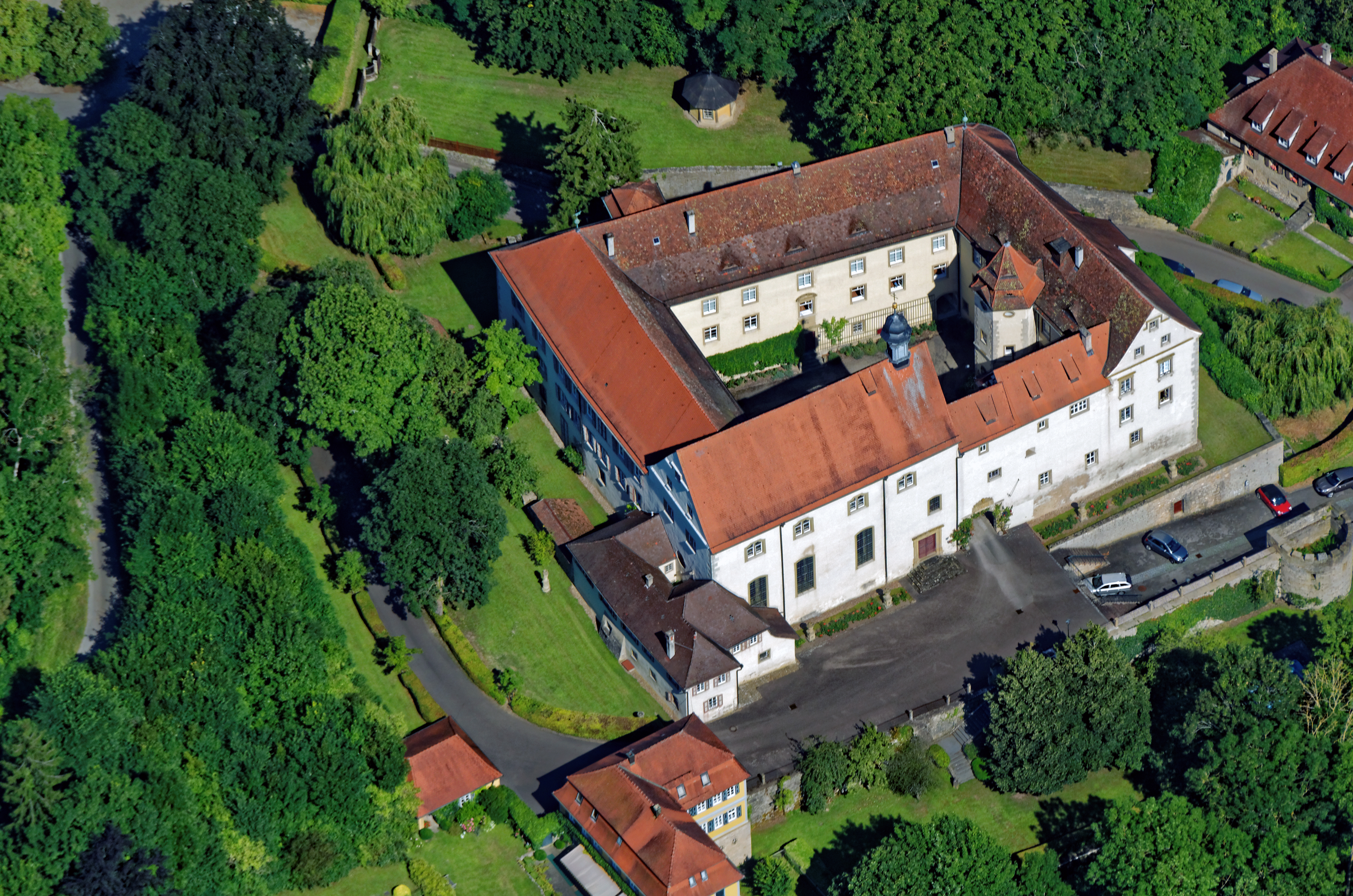
Aerial view of the Haltenbergstetten Castle, 2014

Haltenbergstetten Castle is a castle complex built around 1200 by the House of Hohenlohe and was converted into a palace in the 16th century. The castle is located near the eponymous settlement of Haltenbergstetten within the boundaries of the town of Niederstetten in Baden-Württemberg, Germany. In addition to a natural history museum, the castle also houses a hunting museum, which can be visited upon request.

== History ==
Around 1200, the Hohenlohe family built a castle in Haltenbergstetten, which was converted into a palace in the 16th century. Through changes of ownership in the Middle Ages due to feudal law and later through inheritance, the following successive owners came: the Lords of Hohenlohe, the Counts of Castell, the Schenken von Limpurg, the Lords of Rosenberg, the Counts of Hatzfeld from 1641 to 1794, the Bishopric of Würzburg, and from 1803 the Princes of Hohenlohe-Jagstberg, who still own the palace today.

== Architecture ==
Several stylistic elements of the palace originate from the late Gothic and early Renaissance periods. Only one building, the Baroque palace church with Rococo furnishings and a prince's box, built into the southern part of the east wing, is younger, but fits inconspicuously into the irregular quadrangle. On the slope beyond the road, slightly set back, is the Princess's House, an angular building with a mansard roof. A bay window-like projection can be found on the north, west and south sides. At the northwest corner there is a round tower. A polygonal stair tower is built out onto the courtyard side of the north wing. The main entrance to the palace courtyard is near the east wing. The Princess's House, which is part of the palace ensemble, is well known.

== Uses ==
The Chapel of Maria Immaculata at Haltenbergstetten Castle served as the parish church of the Catholics in Niederstetten until 1966, before the parish church of St. John the Evangelist was built in Niederstetten between 1965 and 1966.

Haltenbergstetten Castle once housed a natural history museum, which is now closed, and the Haltenbergstetten Hunting Museum, which is located in the east and south wings of the Castle. In addition to hunting trophies and taxidermied wild animals, collections of native and exotic bird species can be seen there.

== Gallery ==
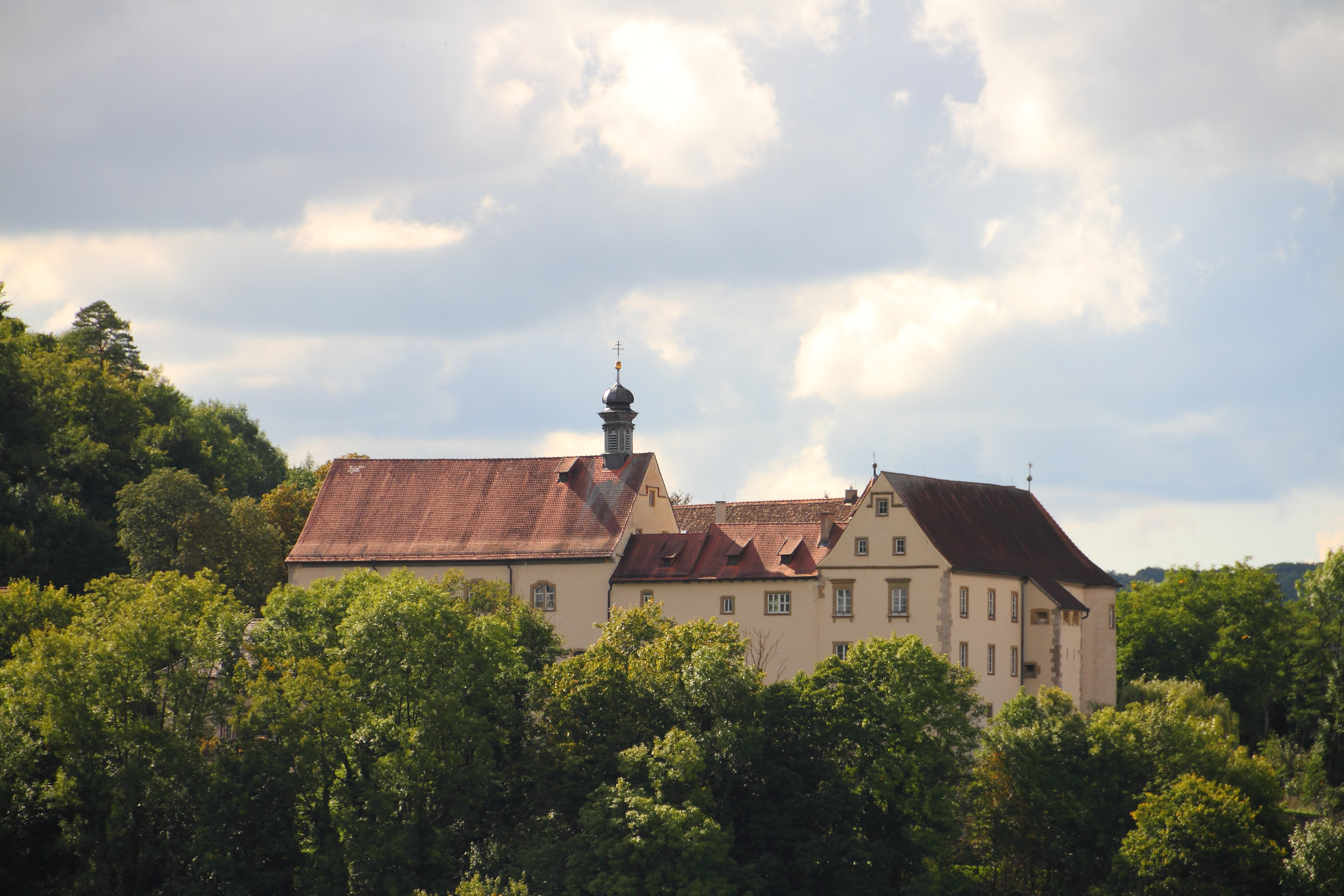
View from village

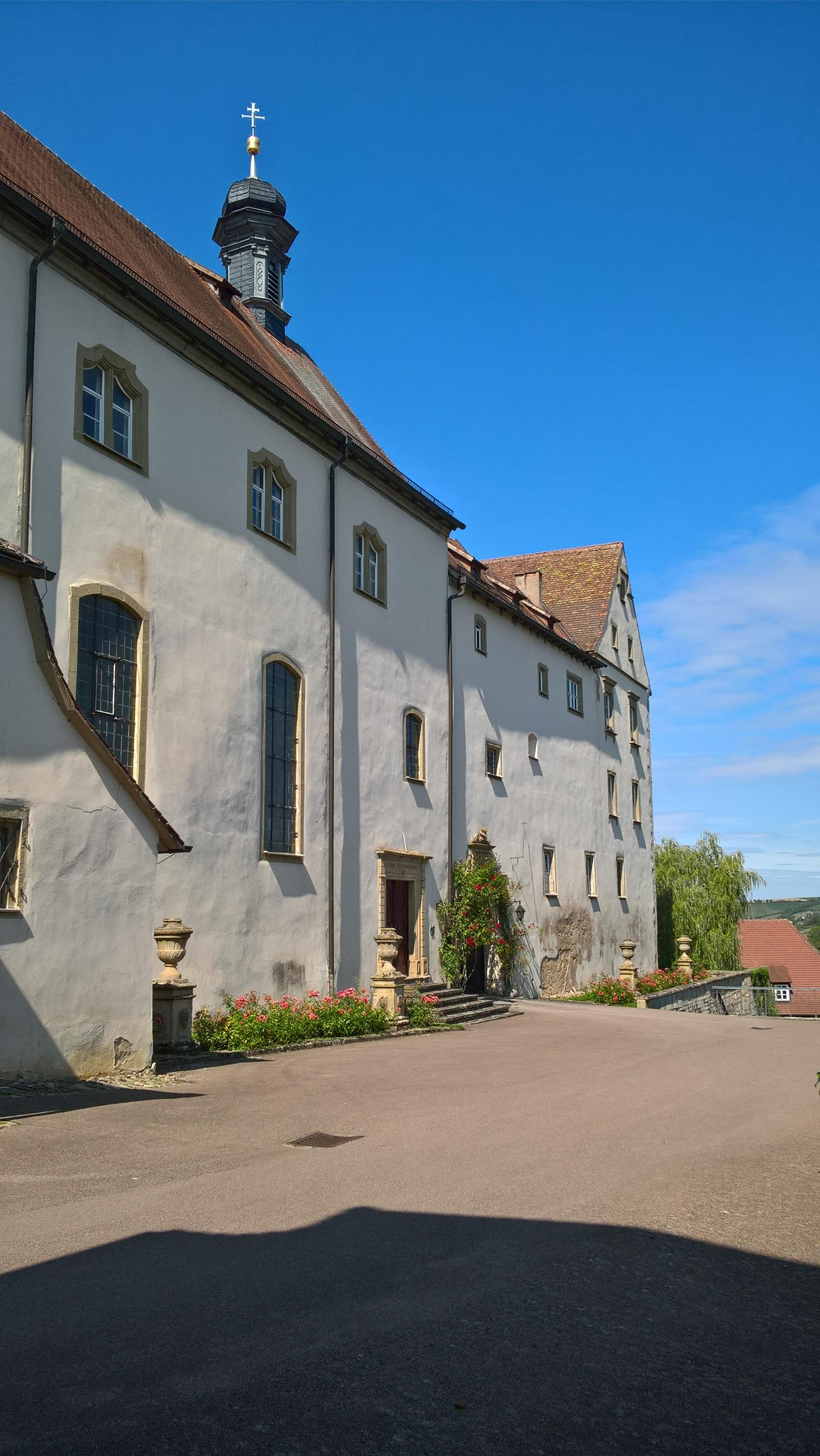
The castle church located in the southern part of the east wing.

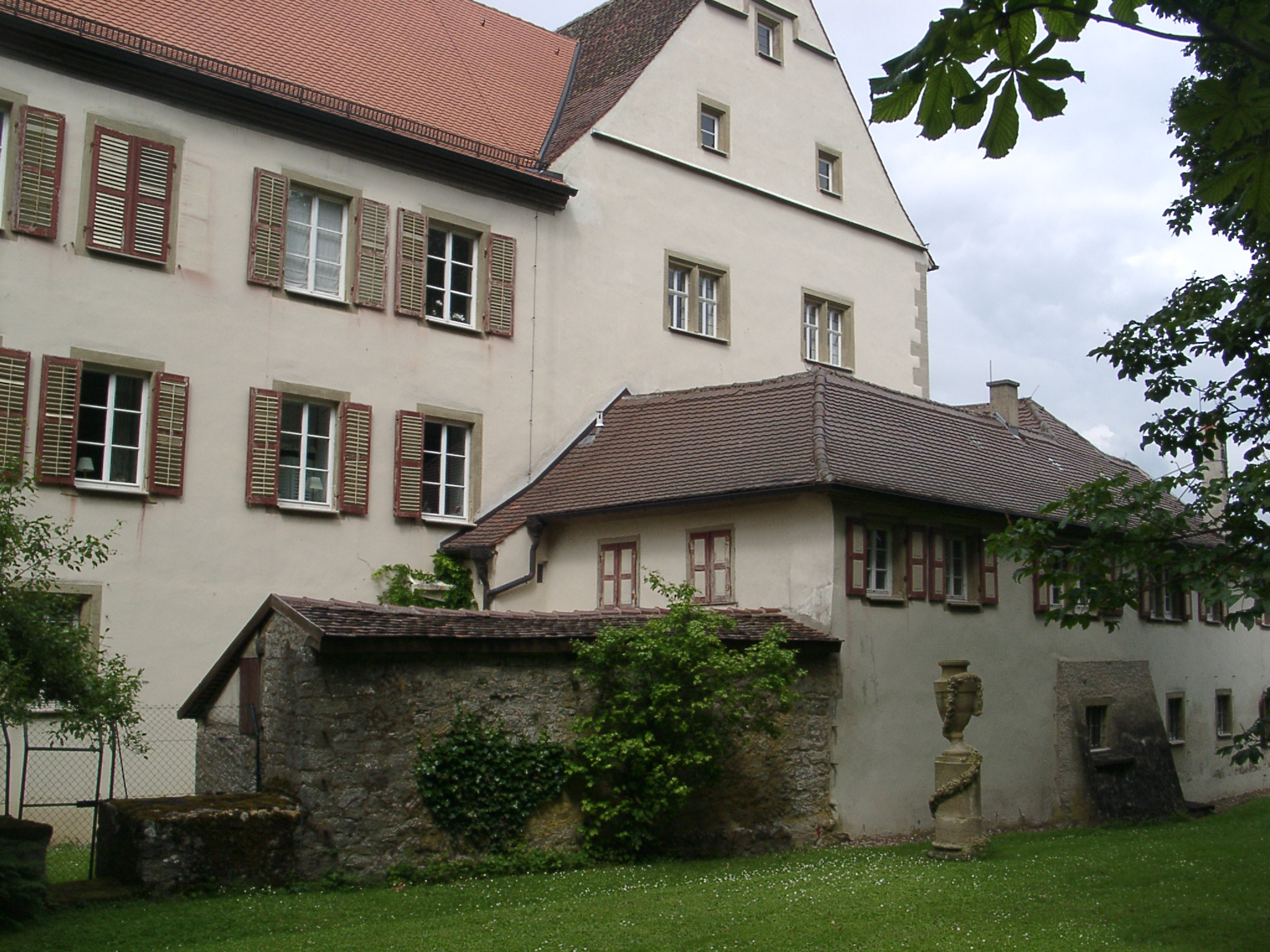
Exterior wall

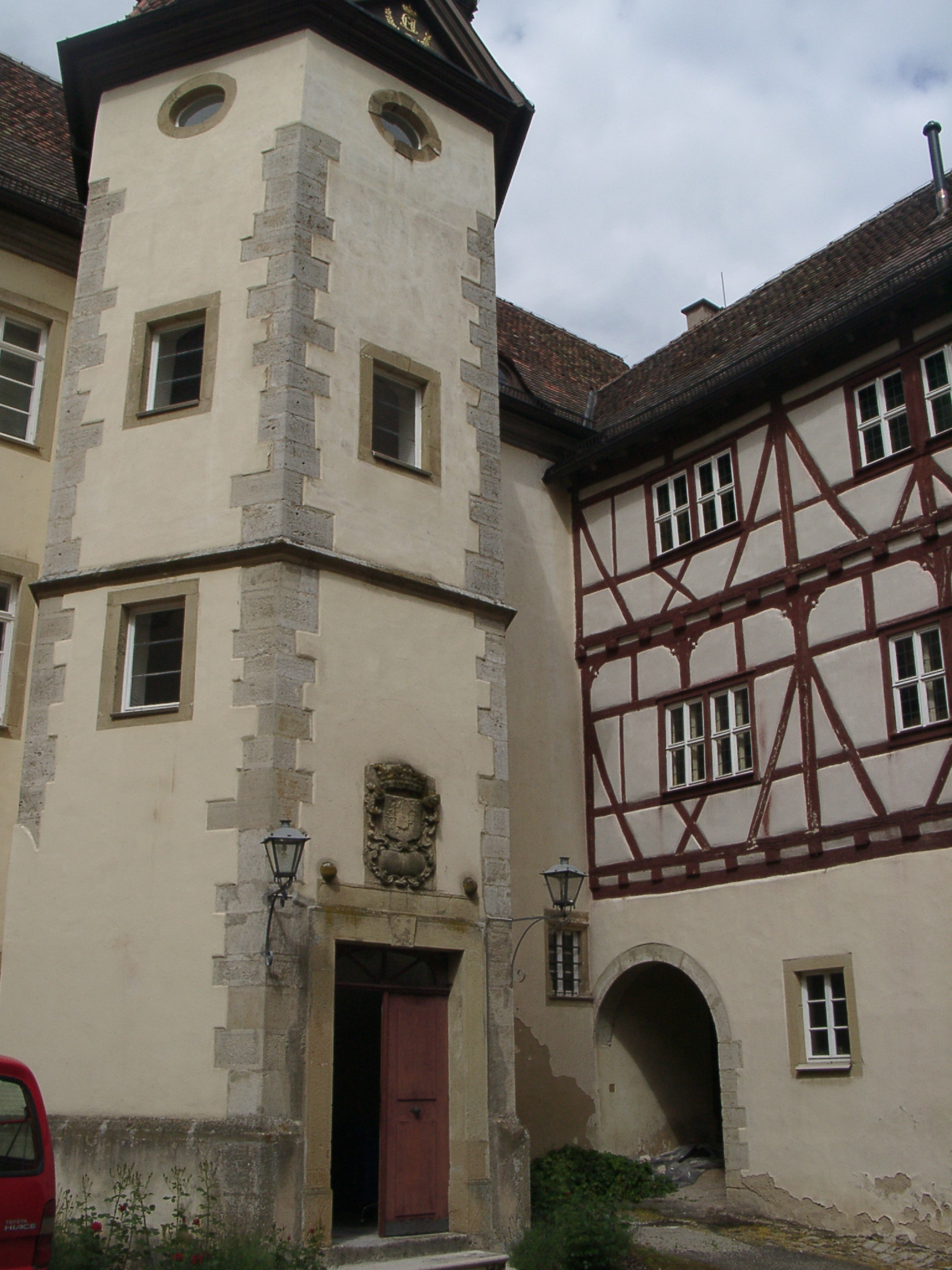
Courtyard

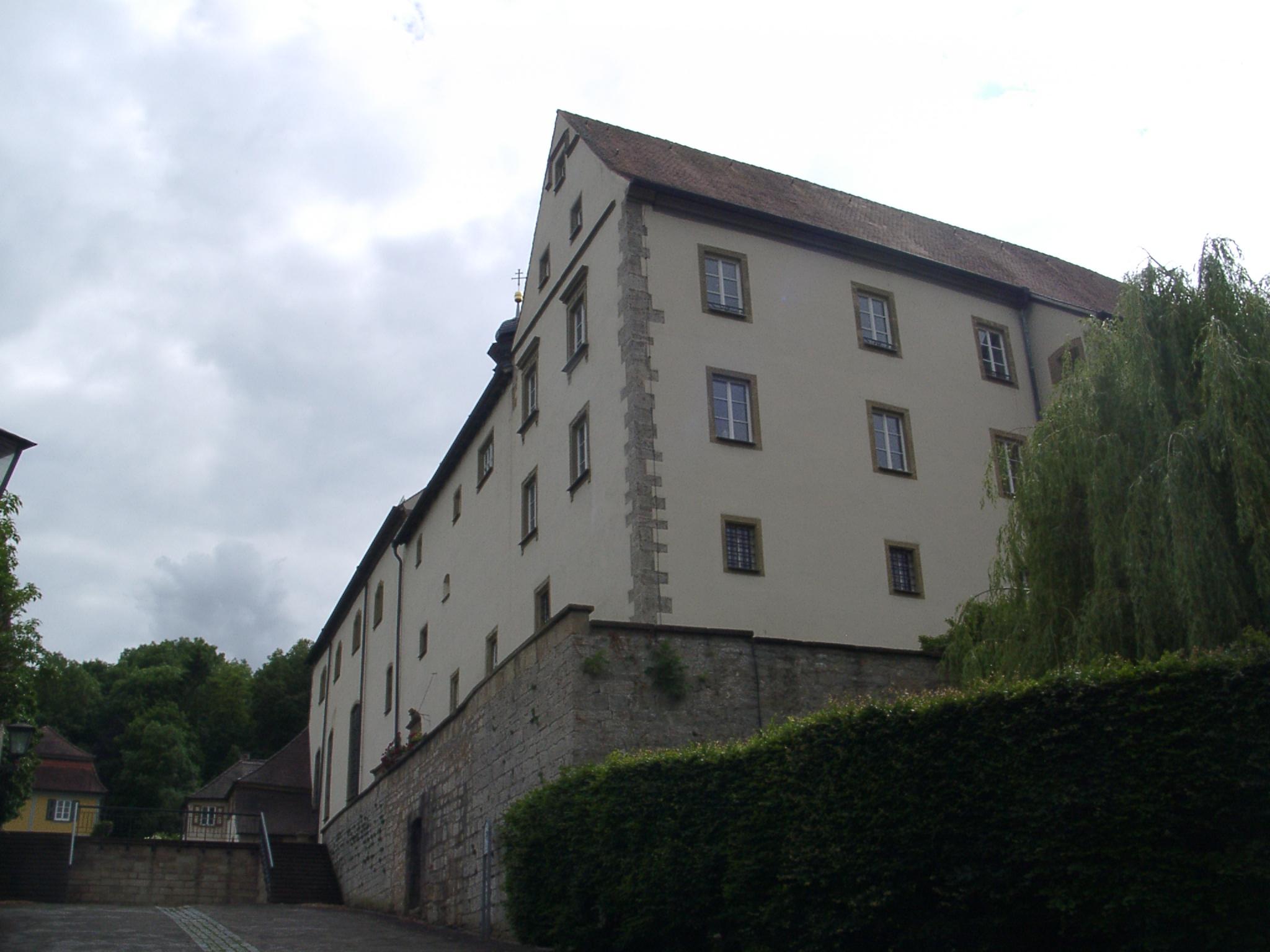
Exterior wall
