= Hohenlohe-Jagstberg =

Coordinates: 49.3336°N 9.7941°E

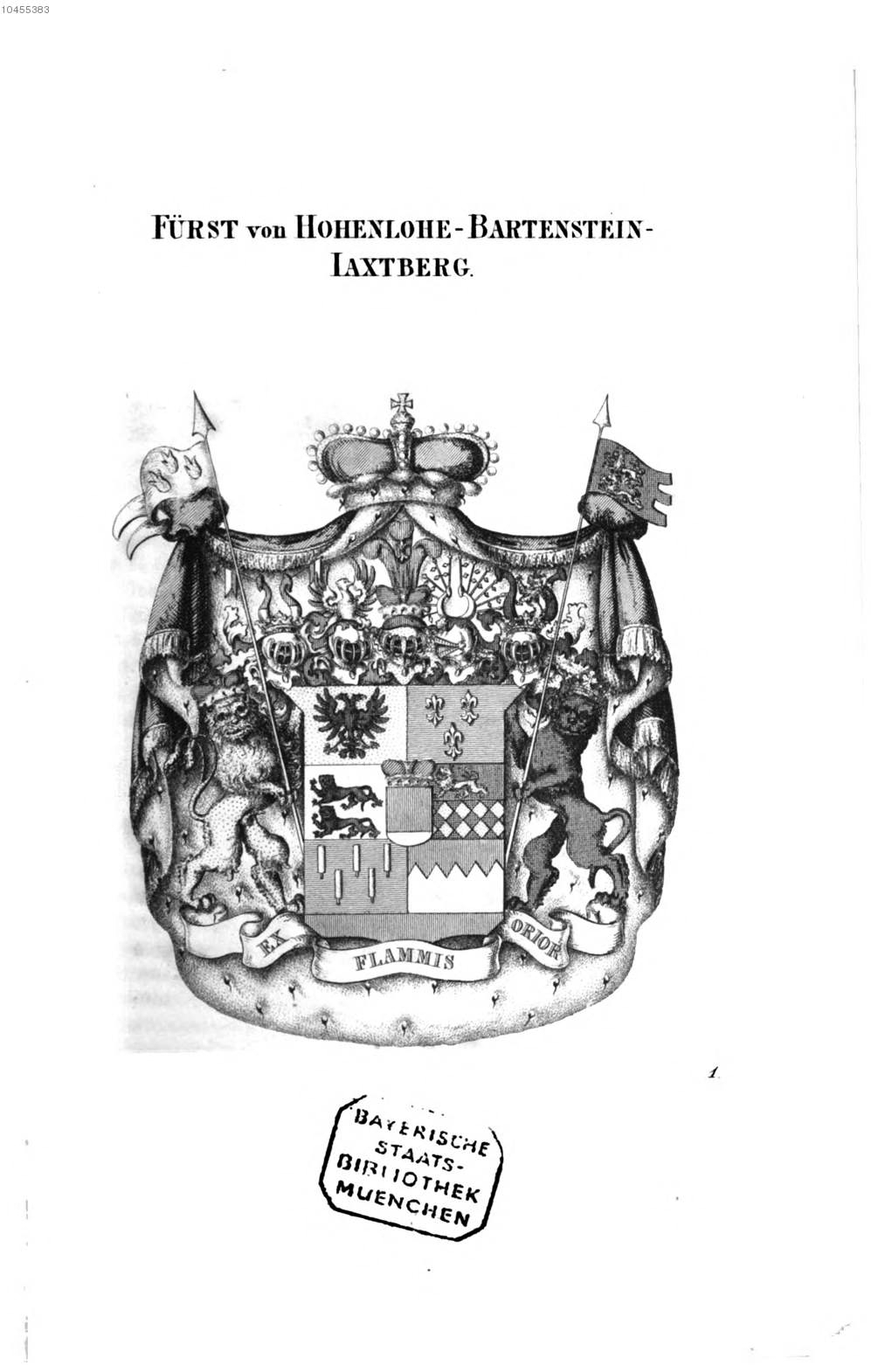
Arms of Hohenlohe-Jagdsberg

Hohenlohe-Jagstberg is the name of a branch of the House of Hohenlohe with its seat at Haltenbergstetten Castle in northeastern Baden-Württemberg, Germany.

== History ==
The branch of Hohenlohe-Brauneck received Jagstberg (near Mulfingen) as af fief from the Bishop of Würzburg around 1300. The Lords of Hohenlohe-Brauneck became extinct in 1390. Jagstberg Castle came to various other feudal holders, but repeatedly also back to the House of Hohenlohe.

A side line of the branch of Hohenlohe-Bartenstein, whose principality was mediatised to Württemberg in 1806, was founded by Charles Joseph who was created Prince of Hohenlohe-Jagstberg in 1798 and acquired Haltenbergstetten Castle in 1803 which had been built by the House of Hohenlohe around 1200.

A second branch of that name descends from Albrecht (1906-1996), created Prince of Hohenlohe-Jagstberg in 1906. Their residence is Haltenbergstetten Castle.

== Prince of Hohenlohe-Jagstberg (1798–1806) ==
- Charles Joseph (1798–1806)

== Prince of Hohenlohe-Jagstberg (New, 1906) ==
- Albrecht, 1st Prince 1906-1996 (1906-1996)
  - Alexander, 2nd Prince 1996-present (b.1940)
    - Karl, Hereditary Prince of Hohenlohe-Jagstberg (b.1967)
      - Prince Carlos (b.2007)

== Properties ==
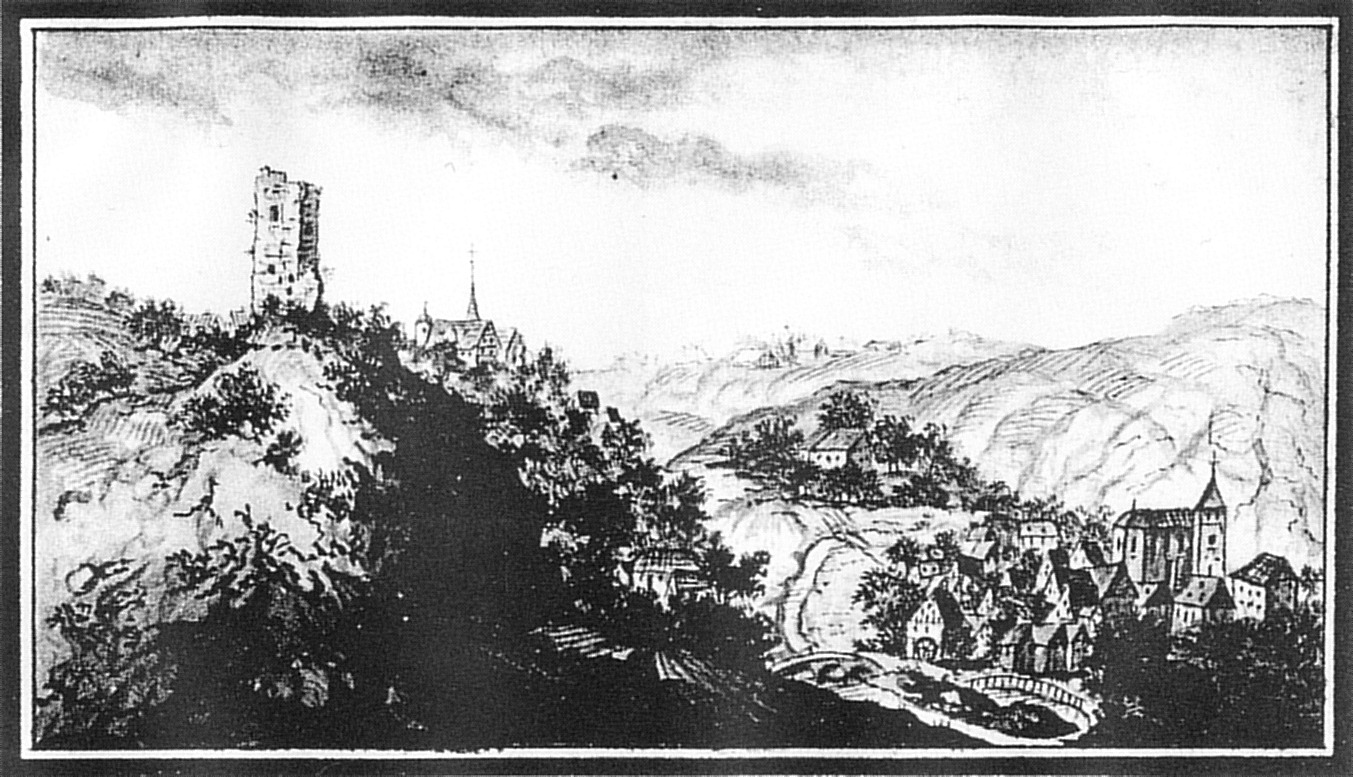
Ruins of Jagstberg Castle above Mulfingen (in 1799)

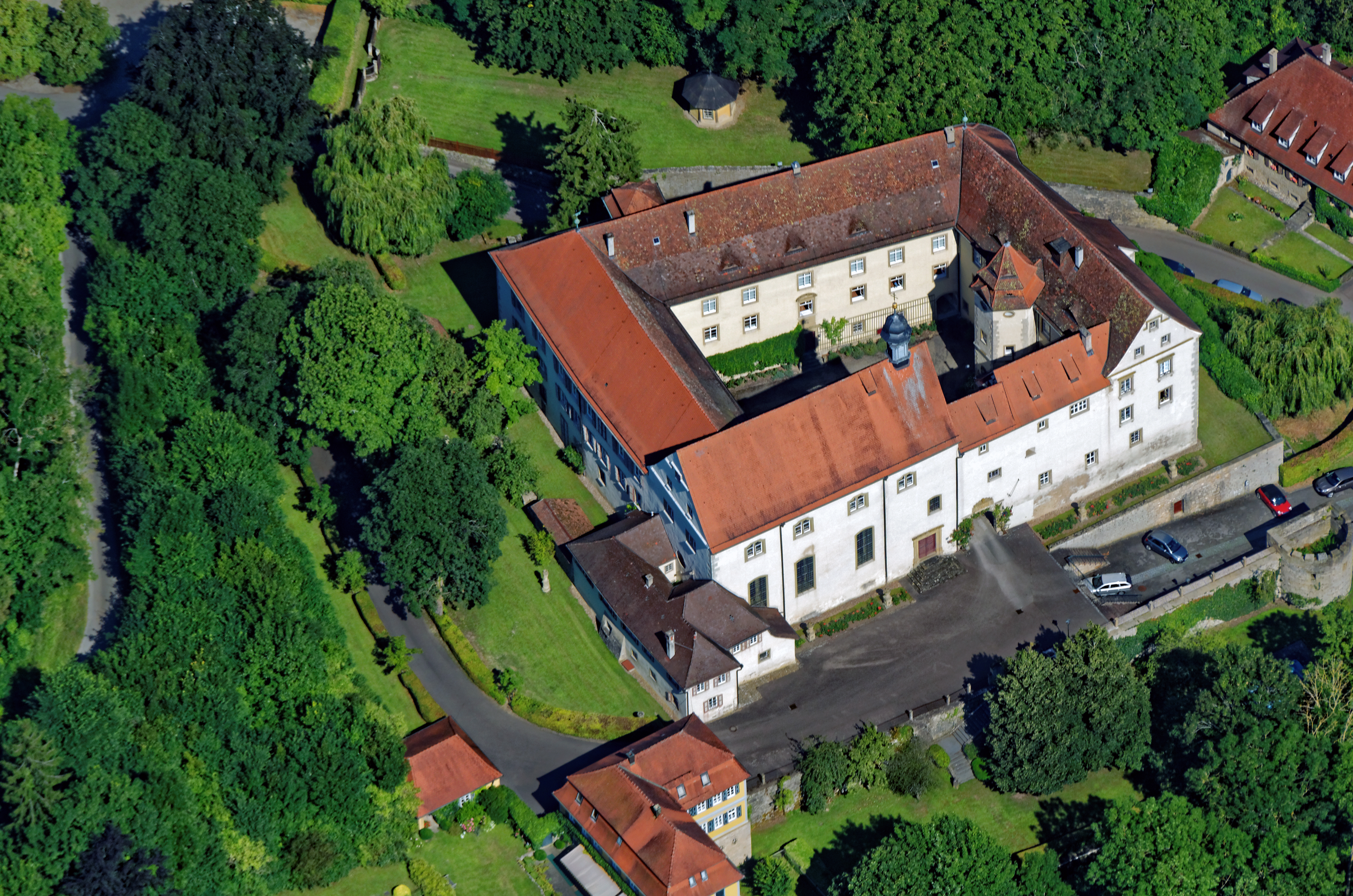
Haltenbergstetten Castle in Niederstetten
