= Reinhard Sebastian Zimmermann =

German painter

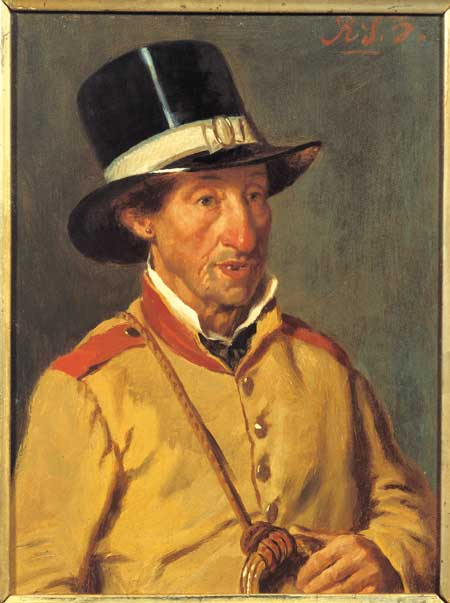
Reinhard Sebastian Zimmermann, Baden Postilion, 1870

Reinhard Sebastian Zimmermann (1815 – 1893) was a German artist who studied at the Munich Academy under Julius Schnorr, Heinrich Maria von Hess and Clemens von Zimmermann.

At first active as portrait painter, he was appointed a royal painter of the Grand Duke of Baden and dedicated himself to depicting Bavarian and Swabian peasant life. He repainted the same subject several times like the painting "Zahlungsschwierigkeiten" (Payment Difficulties) first version dates from 1852, the later once from 1855 a.s.o.

His paintings are displayed at Victoria and Albert Museum, London, at Neue Pinakothek, Munich, and in many other museums.
