= Schrozberg =

- Town
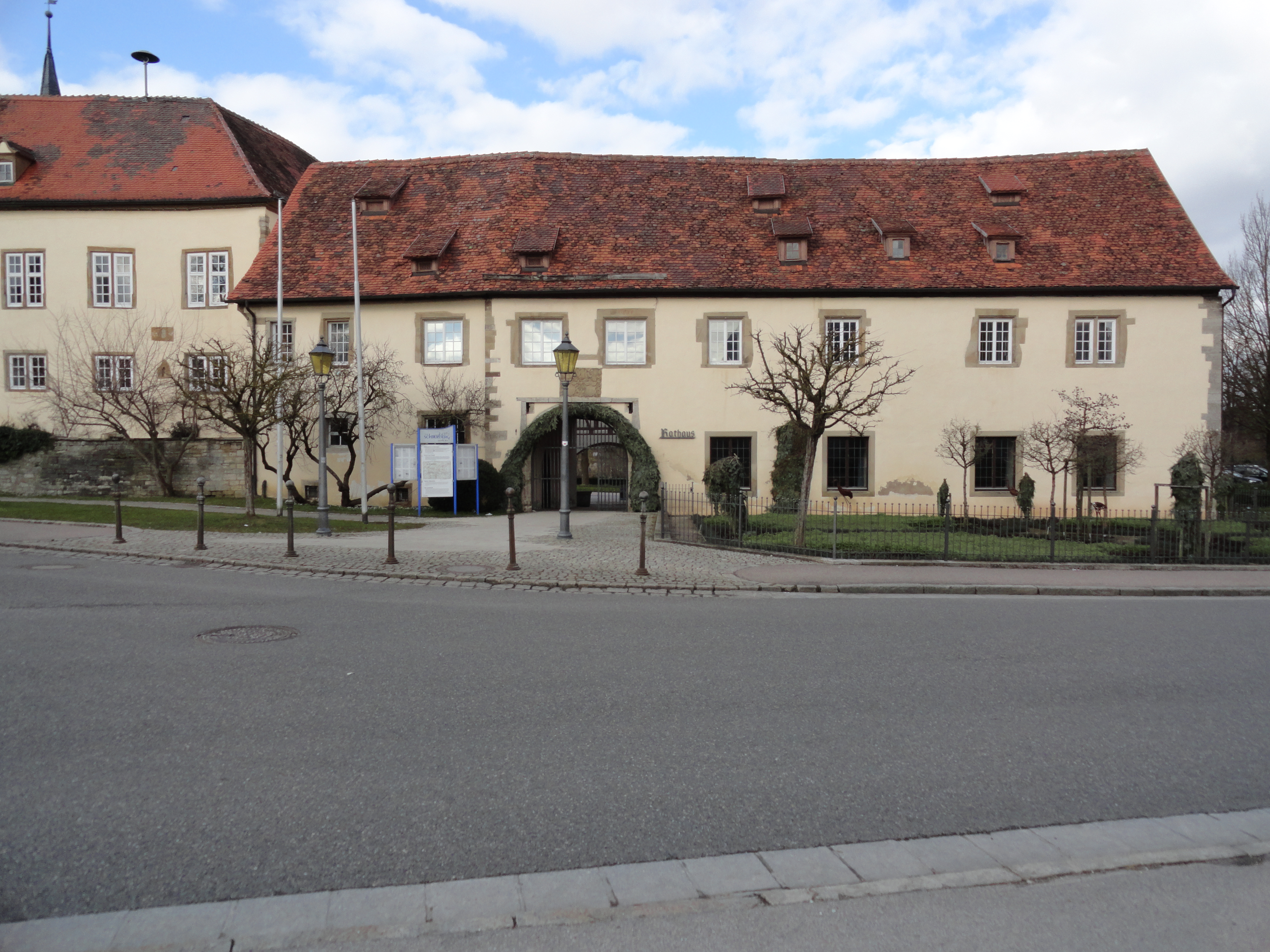
- Schrozberg Rathaus, the town hall

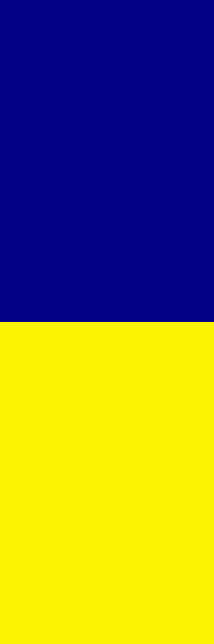
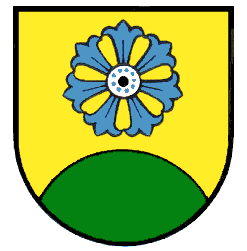
- Flag Coat of arms

- Location of Schrozberg within Schwäbisch Hall district
- Interactive map of Schrozberg
- Location within Germany Location within Baden-Württemberg
- Coordinates: 49°20′40″N 09°58′50″E
- Country: Germany
- State: Baden-Württemberg
- Admin. region: Stuttgart
- District: Schwäbisch Hall

Government
  - Mayor (2024–32): Jacqueline Förderer

Area
  - Total: 105.21 km^{2} (40.62 sq mi)
- Elevation: 455 m (1,493 ft)

Population (2025-12-31)
  - Total: 5,768
  - Density: 54.82/km^{2} (142.0/sq mi)
- Time zone: UTC+01:00 (CET)
  - Summer (DST): UTC+02:00 (CEST)
- Postal codes: 74575
- Dialling codes: 07935
- Vehicle registration: SHA
- Website: www.stadt-schrozberg.de

Schrozberg (German pronunciation: [ˈʃʁɔtsˌbɛʁk]) is a town in the district of Schwäbisch Hall, in Baden-Württemberg, Germany. It is located 21 km (13 mi) west of Rothenburg ob der Tauber, and 31 km (19 mi) northeast of Schwäbisch Hall.

Schrozburg Castle of the Lords of Schrozberg was built in the 12th century and destroyed in 1441 by the city of Rothenburg. Schrozberg was then possessed by the lords of Schrozberg, later jointly by the noble families Seldeneck, Adelsheim, the city of Rothenburg, the House of Hohenlohe und the barons of Berlichingen. A new castle outside the town was built in the early 16th century.

By 1455, Albrecht of Hohenlohe had acquired the castle and lordship of Bartenstein near Schrozberg. The castle is still today the residence of the Prince of Hohenlohe-Bartenstein.

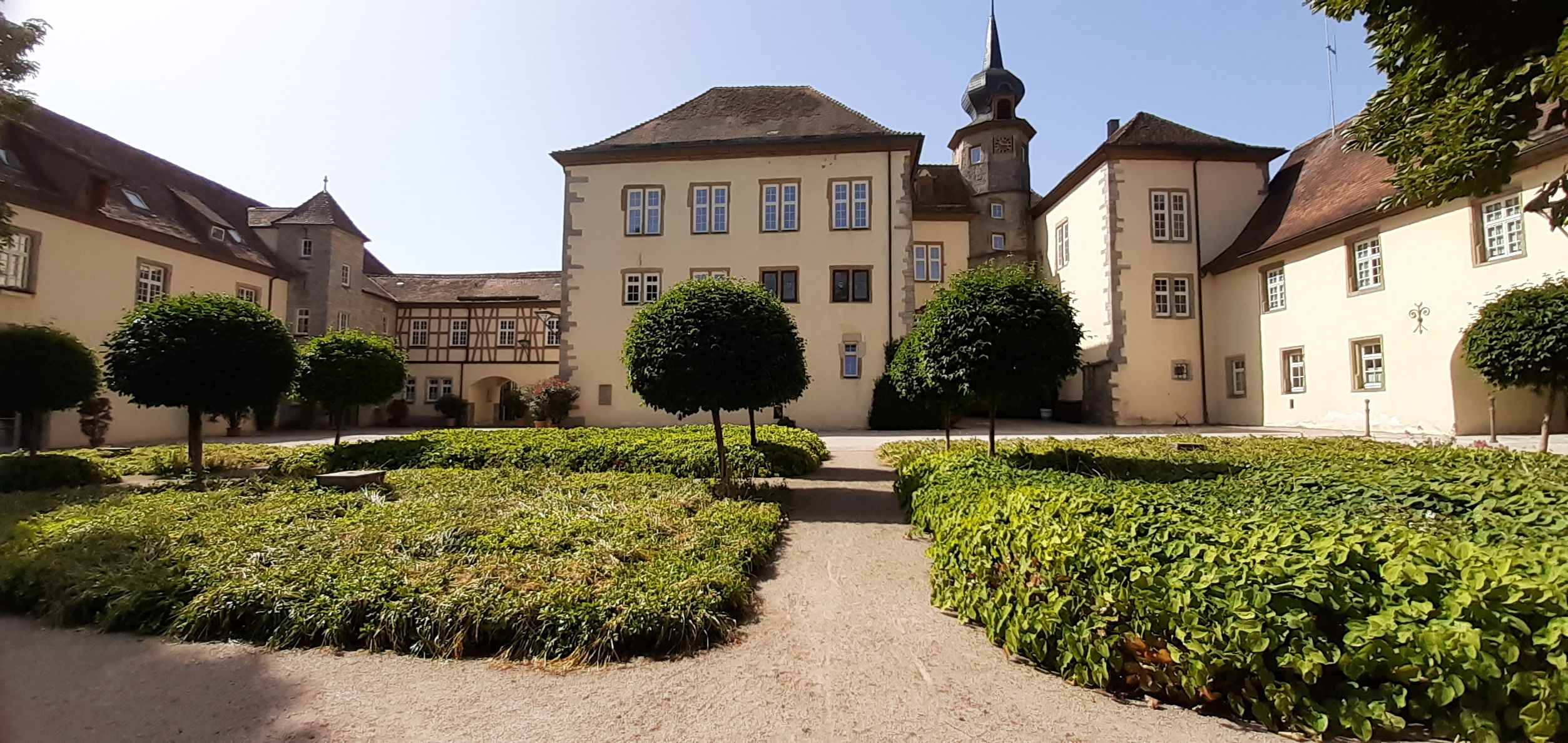
Schrozberg Castle

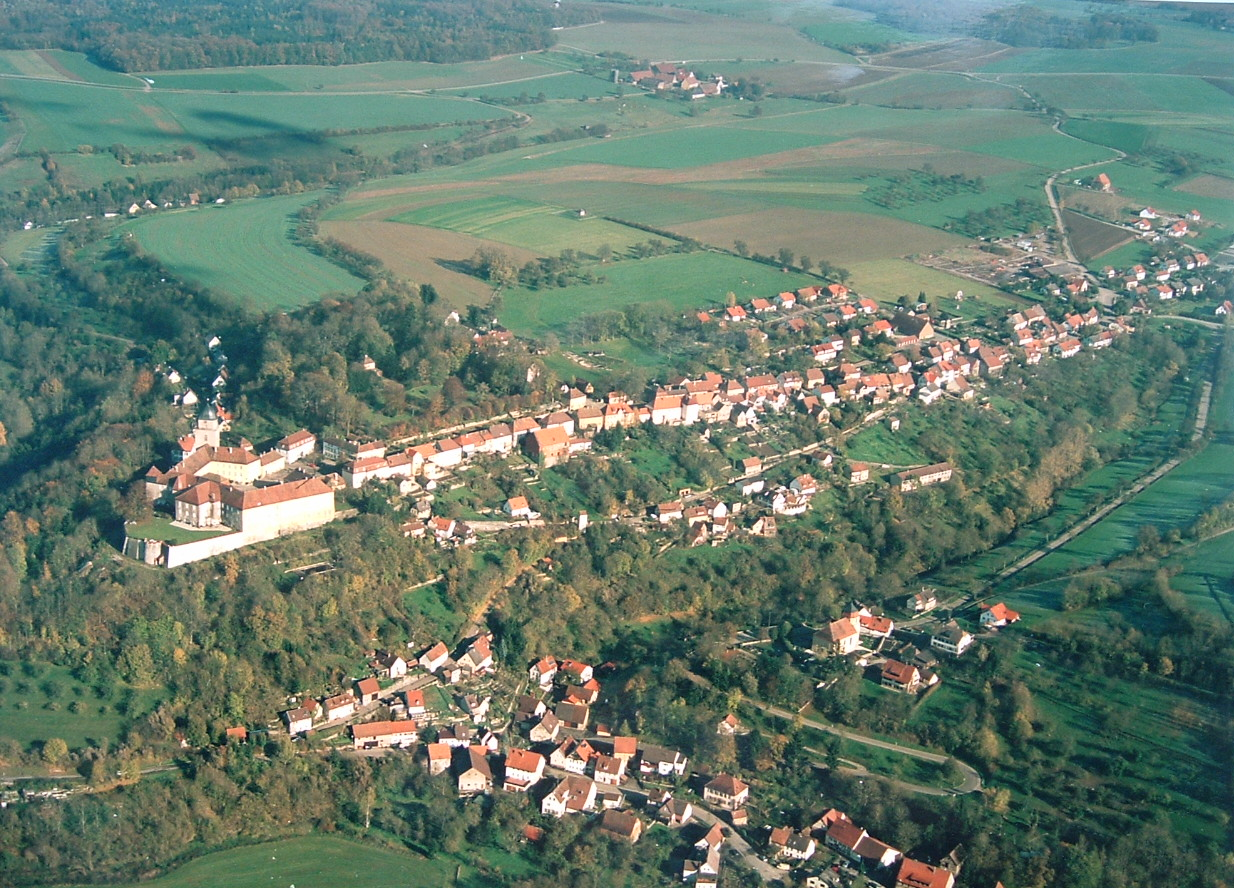
Bartenstein

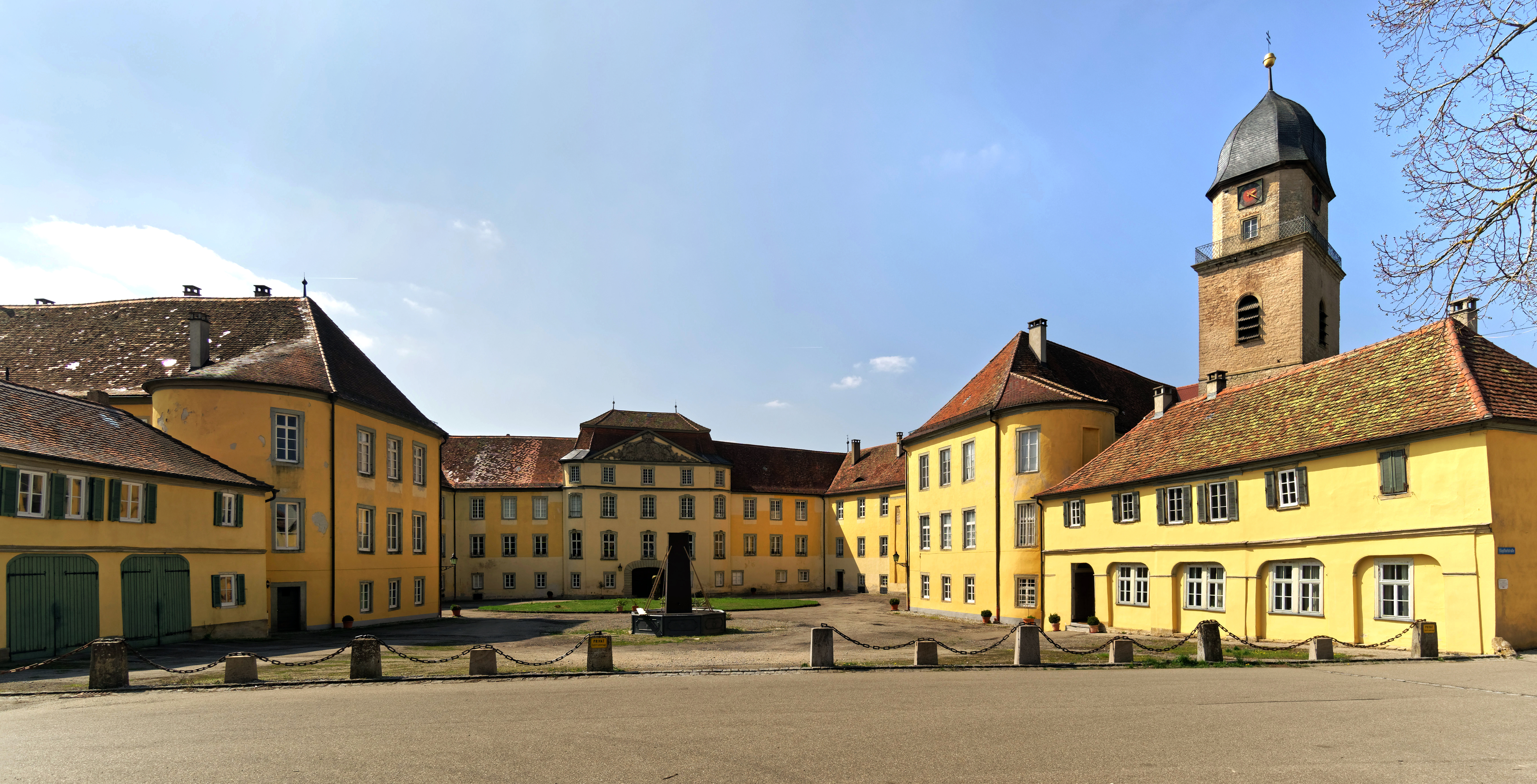
Bartenstein Castle

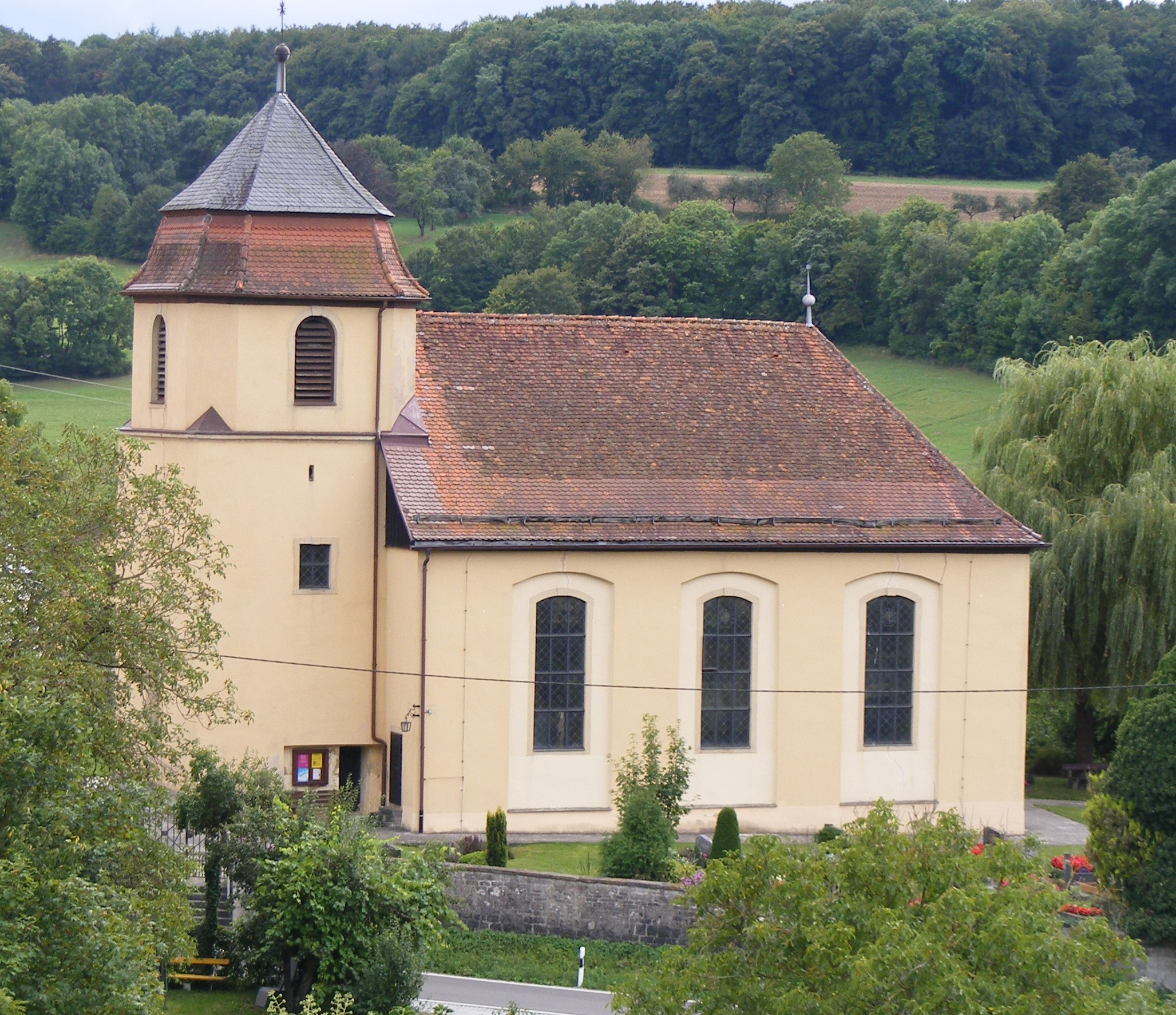
Protestant church Ettenhausen

== Mayors ==
- 1835-1867: Georg Philipp Ernst Wolf (born 1798)
- 1867-1900: Johann Paul Dallinger (1883-1900)
- 1900-1917: Friedrich Scheuermann (born 1866)
- 1917-1927: Friedrich Gottert (born 1882)
- 1928-1945: Wilhelm Hirschburger (born 1901)
- 1945-1946: Max Kunert (1905-1946)
- 1946-1986: Rudolf Neu (1921-2011)
- 1986-2016: Klemens Izsak (born 1954)
- since 1 July 2016: Jacqueline Förderer (born 1988)

== Sons and daughters of the town ==
- Paul Wolf (1879-1957), city planner in Hannover and Dresden
- Fritz Hayn (1885-1968), choirmaster and organist from 1923 on Ulmer Münster
