= Friedrich, 7th Prince Fugger von Babenhausen =

German banker

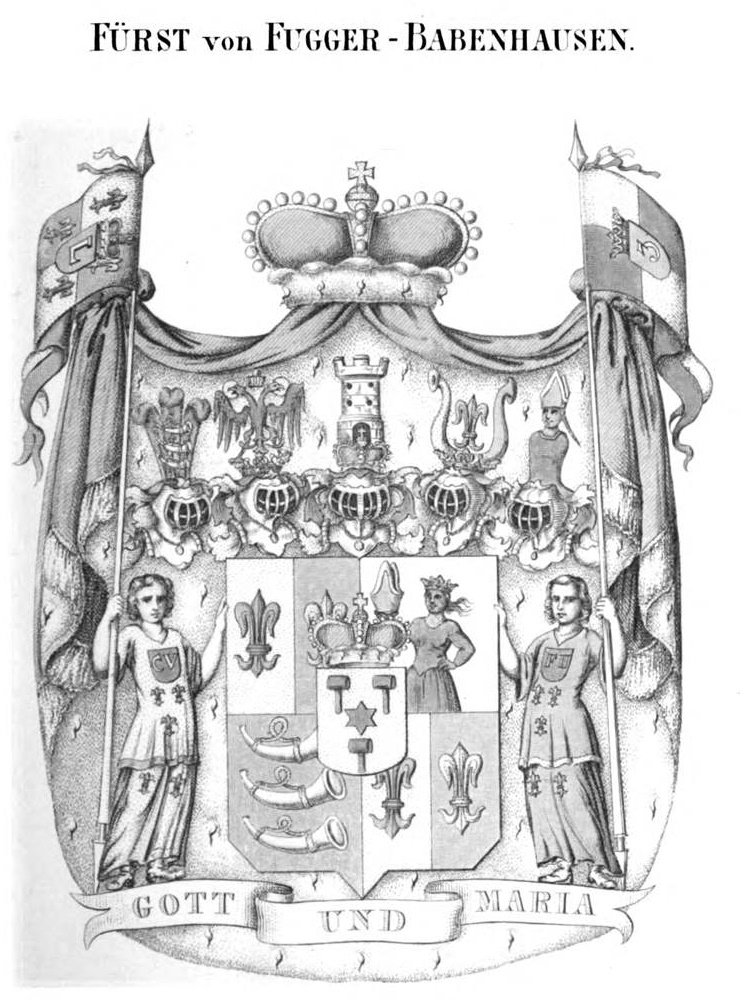
Coat of arms of the Princes of Fugger-Babenhausen

Friedrich Carl Georg Maria Fugger von Babenhausen (26 November 1914 – 22 December 1979) was the head of the House of Fugger-Babenhausen from 1934 to 1979, and formed Fürst Fugger Privatbank in 1954.

== Early life ==
Friedrich was born on 26 November 1914 in Potsdam in Brandenburg, Germany into the ancient House of Fugger. He was the only son of Georg, 6th Prince Fugger von Babenhausen, (Note: In 1912, before his parents were married, The New York Times reported that Prince Georg had fallen in love with Princess Victoria Louise of Prussia, the only daughter of Kaiser Wilhelm II, but the Kaiser had forbidden the marriage because the Fuggers were Roman Catholic.) and Danish Countess Elisabeth von Plessen (1891–1976). His sister, Countess Marie-Louise Fugger von Babenhausen, was the wife of Wilhelm von Hagen.

His paternal grandparents were Karl, 5th Prince Fugger von Babenhausen, and Princess Eleonora of Hohenlohe-Bartenstein. Among his extended family were aunts Countess Friederike Fugger von Babenhausen (wife of Sir Adrian Carton de Wiart), Countess Sylvia Fugger von Babenhausen (wife of Count Friedrich zu Münster, son of Prince Alexander Münster), and Countess Maria Theresia Fugger von Babenhausen (who married Prince Heinrich von Hanau und Horowitz, a grandson of Frederick William, Elector of Hesse). His paternal uncle was Count Leopold Fugger von Babenhausen (who married Countess Vera Czernin von und zu Chudenitz). (Note: Count Leopold Fugger von Babenhausen and Countess Vera Czernin von und zu Chudenitz divorced in 1936, and in 1938 she married the former Chancellor of Austria Kurt Schuschnigg.) His maternal grandfather was Count Carl Gabriel Joachim Wilhelm Scheel-Plessen of Selsø.

== Career ==
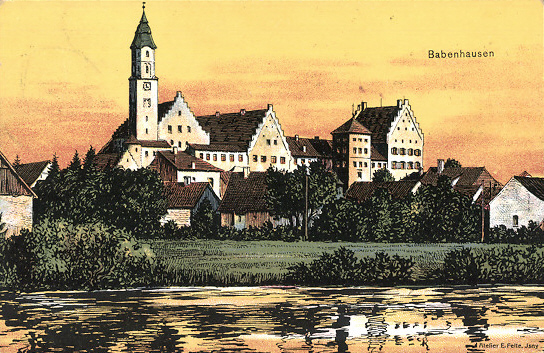
Fugger Castle, 1910

Upon his father's death in 1934, he inherited the Fugger-Babenhausen fideicommissum, including Fugger Castle in Babenhausen, and succeeded to the primogeniture title, 7th Prince Fugger von Babenhausen.

In 1954, he acquired the small Augsburg bank, Friedl and Dumler GmbH, which served the Swabia region of Bavaria. In 1994, his son renamed the bank, Fürst Fugger Privatbank, in reference to his family's historical Fugger banking house that closed in the 17th century.

== Personal life ==
On 10 October 1942 at Sturefors Castle in Östergötland, Prince Friedrich married Countess Gunilla Bielke (1919–2015), a daughter of Count Thure Gabriel Bielke and Brigitta Marianne Sparre of Söfdeborg. A member of the Swedish nobility, her ancestor and namesake Gunilla Bielke, was the Queen of Sweden as consort to King John III of Sweden. Together, they were the parents of five children, including:

- Prince Carl-Anton Maria Fugger von Babenhausen (born 1944), who renounced his rights 1970; he married Princess Hélène de Polignac, a daughter of Armand-Louis de Polignac.
- Herbertus Victor, 8th Prince Fugger von Babenhausen (born 1946), who married Princess Alexandra of Oettingen-Oettingen und Oettingen-Spielberg, sister to Princess Gabriele Oettingen, both daughters of Alois, 9th Prince of Oettingen-Oettingen und Oettingen-Spielberg and Countess Elisabeth Gabriele of Lynar, in 1977.
- Prince Markus Fugger von Babenhausen (born 1950)
- Prince Johannes Anselm Maria Fugger von Babenhausen (born 1957), who married Princess Miriam von Lobkowicz, a daughter of Nikolaus von Lobkowicz, in 1983. He later married Caroline von Schacky-Schönfeld.

Prince Fugger von Babenhausen died at Wellenburg Castle in Augsburg, a city in the Bavarian part of Swabia, on 22 December 1979.

=== Descendants ===
Through his son Herbertus, he was a grandfather of Franziska Fugger von Babenhausen (born 1979), Leopold Fugger von Babenhausen (born 1980), Alexander Fugger von Babenhausen (born 1981), Anastasia Fugger von Babenhausen (born 1986), and Nikolaus Fugger von Babenhausen (born 1993).

Through his son Johannes, he was a grandfather of Constantin Fugger von Babenhausen (who married Sophie von Löwenstein-Wertheim-Freudenberg).
