= Georg, 6th Prince Fugger von Babenhausen =

German soldier and aristocrat

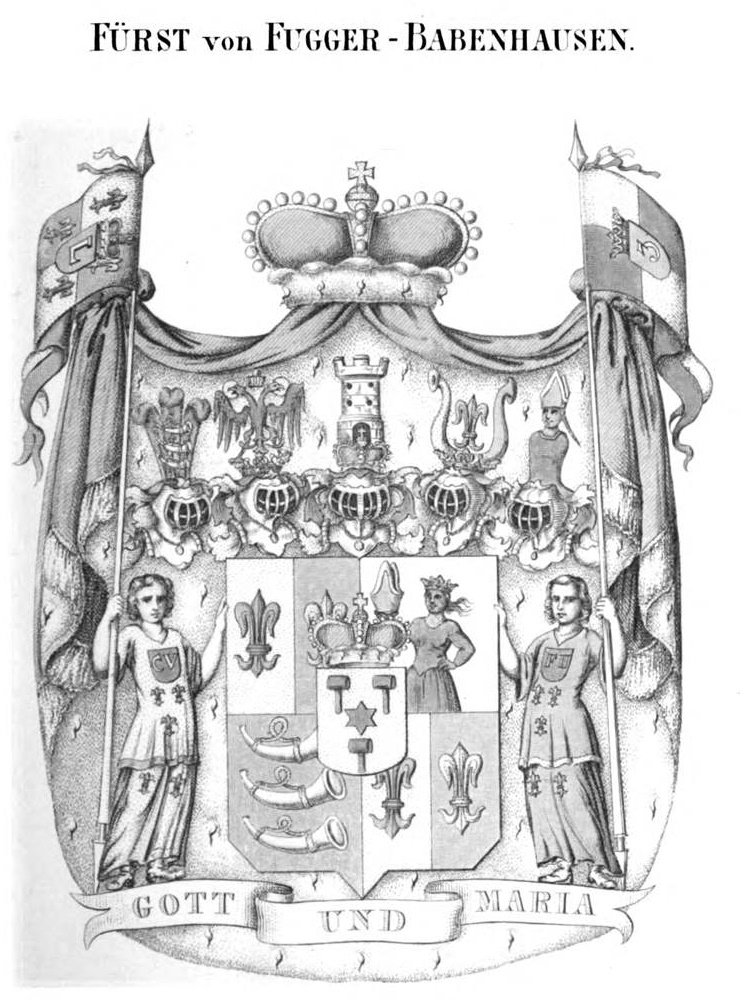
Coat of arms of the Princes of Fugger-Babenhausen

Georg Constantin Heinrich Carl Friedrich Maria Fugger von Babenhausen (24 July 1889 – 1 August 1934) was the head of the House of Fugger-Babenhausen from 1925 to 1934.

== Early life ==
Georg was born on 24 July 1889 in Sopron in the Kingdom of Hungary into the ancient House of Fugger. He was the eldest son of Karl, 5th Prince Fugger von Babenhausen (1861–1925), and Princess Eleonora of Hohenlohe-Bartenstein (1864–1945). Among his siblings were Countess Friederike Fugger von Babenhausen (wife of Sir Adrian Carton de Wiart), Countess Sylvia Fugger von Babenhausen (wife of Count Friedrich zu Münster, son of Prince Alexander Münster), Count Leopold Fugger von Babenhausen (who married Countess Vera Czernin von und zu Chudenitz) (Note: Count Leopold Fugger von Babenhausen and Countess Vera Czernin von und zu Chudenitz divorced in 1936, and in 1938 she married the former Chancellor of Austria Kurt Schuschnigg.), and Countess Maria Theresia Fugger von Babenhausen (who married Prince Heinrich von Hanau und Horowitz, a grandson of Frederick William, Elector of Hesse).

His paternal grandparents were Countess Friederike von Christalnigg-Gillitzstein and Karl Ludwig, 4th Prince Fugger von Babenhausen, who served as First President of the Chamber of Imperial Councillors. His mother was the third child of Prince Carl of Hohenlohe-Bartenstein and Princess Rosa Karoline (née Countess von Sternberg). His maternal uncle, Prince Johannes of Hohenlohe-Bartenstein married Archduchess Anna Maria Theresia of Austria (a daughter of Ferdinand IV, Grand Duke of Tuscany and sister of Luise, Crown Princess of Saxony).

He grew up in Ödenburg, where his father served as an officer, and from 1895 in Vienna. In 1903, he asked the Emperor to be his confirmation sponsor, to which the Emperor agreed; at the ceremony he was represented by his First Lord Chamberlain, Prince Rudolf of Liechtenstein. After the death of his grandfather in 1906, Prince Karl Ludwig, in 1906, his family moved from Vienna to the Fugger Castle in Babenhausen.

== Career ==
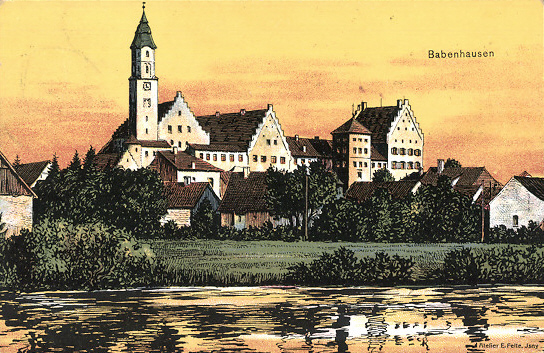
Fugger Castle, 1910

During the First World War, Hereditary Count Georg served in the Life Guards of the Prussian Army (the personal bodyguard of the German Emperor). The Regiment wore a white cuirassier uniform with certain special distinctions in full dress.

Upon his father's death in 1925, he inherited the Fugger-Babenhausen fideicommissum and succeeded to the primogeniture title, 6th Prince Fugger von Babenhausen.

== Personal life ==
In March 1912, The New York Times reported that Hereditary Count Georg and Princess Victoria Louise of Prussia, the only daughter of Kaiser Wilhelm II, had fallen in love. Due to the Fuggers being Roman Catholic and their difference in rank, the Kaiser had forbidden the marriage and sent his daughter to St. Moritz on a "rest cure". She later married Ernest Augustus, Duke of Brunswick in May 1913, which ended the decades-long feud between the Prussians and the Hanoverians.

=== Marriage ===
On 10 February 1914 in Berlin, then Hereditary Count George married Danish Countess Elisabeth von Plessen (1891–1976), a daughter of Carl Gabriel Joachim Wilhelm Scheel-Plessen of Selsø. Together, they were the parents of two children:

- Friedrich Karl Fugger von Babenhausen (1914–1979), who founded Fürst Fugger Privatbank in 1954; he married Countess Gunilla Bielke, daughter of Count Thure Gabriel Bielke and Brigitta Marianne Sparre of Söfdeborg, (Note: Countess Gunilla Bielke (1919–2015), was a member of the Swedish noble family Bielke and her namesake, Gunilla Bielke, was Queen of Sweden as the consort to King John III of Sweden.) in 1942.
- Marie-Louise Fugger von Babenhausen (1916–1993), who married Wilhelm von Hagen in 1940.

Prince Fugger von Babenhausen died at Wellenburg Castle in Augsburg, a city in the Bavarian part of Swabia, on 1 August 1934.

=== Descendants ===
Through his only son Friedrich, he was a grandfather of Herbertus Victor, 8th Prince Fugger von Babenhausen (b. 1946), who married Princess Alexandra of Oettingen-Oettingen und Oettingen-Spielberg, sister to Princess Gabriele Oettingen, both daughters of Alois, 9th Prince of Oettingen-Oettingen und Oettingen-Spielberg and Countess Elisabeth Gabriele of Lynar, in 1977.
