= Karl, 4th Prince Fugger von Babenhausen =

Karl Ludwig
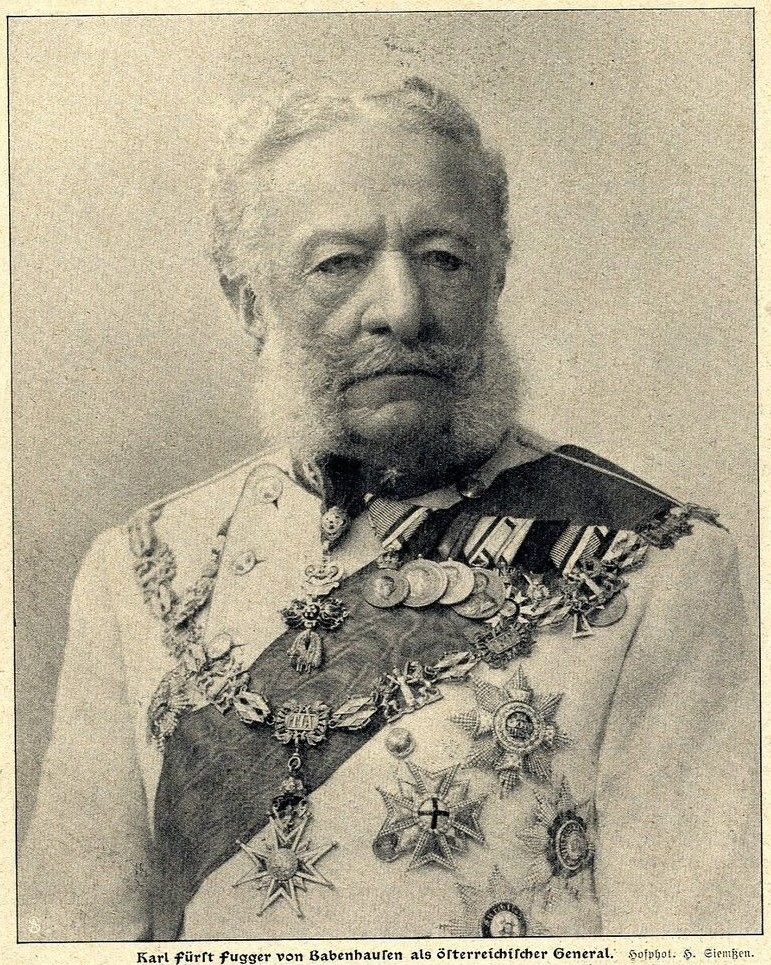

Prince Fugger von Babenhausen
- Reign: 1885–1906
- Predecessor: Leopold
- Successor: Karl
- Born: 4 February 1829; Babenhausen, Kingdom of Bavaria
- Died: 26 May 1906 (aged 77); Babenhausen, Kingdom of Bavaria
- Spouse: Countess Friederike von Christallnigg (m. 1855; died 1888)
- Issue: Countess Pauline; Countess Marie; Karl, 5th Prince Fugger von Babenhausen
Names
- Karl Ludwig Maria Joseph Anselm Andreas Fugger von Babenhausen
- House: Fugger
- Father: Anton, 2nd Prince Fugger von Babenhausen
- Mother: Princess Franziska of Hohenlohe-Bartenstein-Jagtsberg

Karl Ludwig Maria Joseph Anselm Andreas Fürst Fugger von Babenhausen (4 February 1829 – 12 May 1906) was a German nobleman of the Fugger family. He was styled Count until the death of his brother in 1885, when he became the titular Prince of the Principality of Babenhausen, which had been mediatized to the Kingdom of Bavaria in 1806, (Note: Karl was also Hereditary Count Fugger of Babenhausen, Lord of Boas, Heimertingen, Wald, Wellenberg, Count of Kirchberg, etc.) in what is now the Landkreis Unterallgäu.

== Early life ==
Karl was born on 4 February 1829 in Babenhausen. He was the second son of Anton, 2nd Prince Fugger von Babenhausen (1800–1836) and Princess Franziska of Hohenlohe-Bartenstein-Jagtsberg (1807–1873). Among his siblings were Leopold Fugger von Babenhausen (who married Countess Anna von Gatterburg), and Count Friedrich Fugger von Babenhausen (who married Baroness Maria von Gudenus).

His paternal grandparents were Anselm, 1st Prince Fugger von Babenhausen and Countess Maria Antonia Elisabetha von Waldburg zu Zeil-Wurzach. His maternal grandparents were Charles Joseph, 1st Prince of Hohenlohe-Jagstberg and Duchess Henriette of Württemberg (the youngest daughter of Louis Eugene, Duke of Württemberg, reigning Duke of Württemberg).

After being educated by private tutors, he attended the Engineering Academy in Vienna from 1842 to 1847.

== Career ==
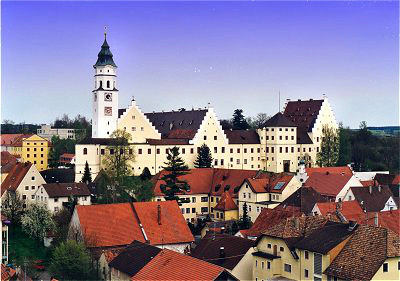
Babenhausen Castle

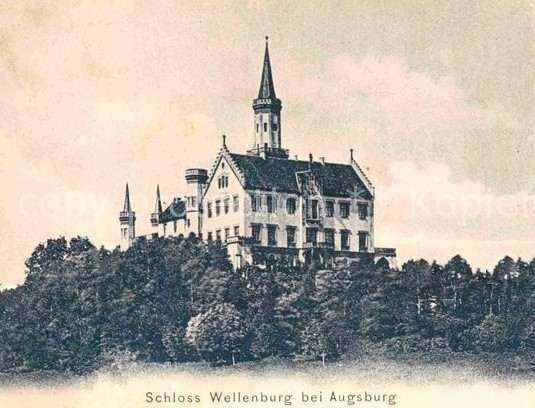
Wellenburg Castle

Fugger-Babenhausen was an officer in the Austrian army and began his military career in 1847 as a Second lieutenant. In 1848 he was promoted to First lieutenant; Captain in 1851; and Major in 1862. As a Major, he was senior Chamberlain to Archduke Heinrich Anton of Austria from 1865 to 1868. In 1867 he was promoted to Lieutenant colonel and, in July 1868, while still out of service, to Colonel. His was promoted to Major general in 1897.

After his 1855 marriage, he spent most of his free time at Meiselberg Castle, his wife's family estate in Carinthia. From 1868 to 1885, he owned the Tanzenberg estate near Hörzendorf. On 9 January 1884, he was appointed a life member of the Chamber of Imperial Councillors and an Imperial and Royal Privy Councillor.

Upon the death of his elder brother in 1885 without male issue, he succeeded as 4th Prince Fugger von Babenhausen, with the noble title of His Serene Highness, and Head of the Babenhausen estate and the entire princely entail, including Wellenburg and Babenhausen Castles, as well as the Fugger houses in Augsburg. He moved from Meiselberg Castle to Babenhausen and became a Bavarian nobleman. From 1885 to 1906 he was thus also a hereditary member of the Bavarian Chamber of Imperial Councillors. From 1891 to 1893, he was a member of the Presidium and, during this time, served as First President of the Chamber of Imperial Councillors.

In 1900, he was admitted as a Knight into the Order of the Golden Fleece. He was also Honorary Grand Commander of the Bavarian Order of St. George and Capitular of the Order of St. Hubertus.

== Personal life ==
On 8 October 1855 in Klagenfurt, Fugger-Babenhausen married Countess Friederike von Christallnigg (1832–1888). Together, they were the parents of the following children:

- Countess Pauline Fugger von Babenhausen (1857–1886), who married Count Janko Vojkffy von Vojkovic in 1879.
- Countess Marie Fugger von Babenhausen (1858–1927), who married Count Christoph von Wydenbruck, who became the Ambassador of Austria-Hungary to Madrid, in 1880.
- Karl, 5th Prince Fugger von Babenhausen (1861–1925), who married Princess Eleonore of Hohenlohe-Bartenstein, third child of Prince Carl of Hohenlohe-Bartenstein, in 1887.

Prince Karl died at Babenhausen on 12 May 1906. His successor as Prince and Head of the Babenhausen estate and the entire princely entail was his only son Karl.

=== Descendants ===
Through his son Karl, he was a grandfather of Countess Friederike (1887–1949), who married Sir Adrian Carton de Wiart; Georg, 6th Prince Fugger von Babenhausen (1889–1934), who married Countess Elisabeth von Plessen; Countess Sylvia (1892–1949), who married, and divorced, Count Friedrich zu Münster (son of Prince Alexander Münster and Lady Muriel Hay, daughter of the 12th Earl of Kinnoull); Count Leopold (1893–1966), who married, and divorced, Countess Vera Czernin von und zu Chudenitz (she later married Chancellor Kurt Schuschnigg); and Countess Maria Theresia (1899–1994), who married Prince Heinrich von Hanau und Horowitz, a grandson of Frederick William, Elector of Hesse.
