= Maximilianstraße =

Maximilianstraße may refer to one of the following places in Germany:

- Maximilianstraße (Augsburg), a street
- Maximilianstraße (Munich), a street
- Maximilianstraße station, a U-Bahn station in Nuremberg
