= Karl, 5th Prince Fugger von Babenhausen =

German soldier and aristocrat

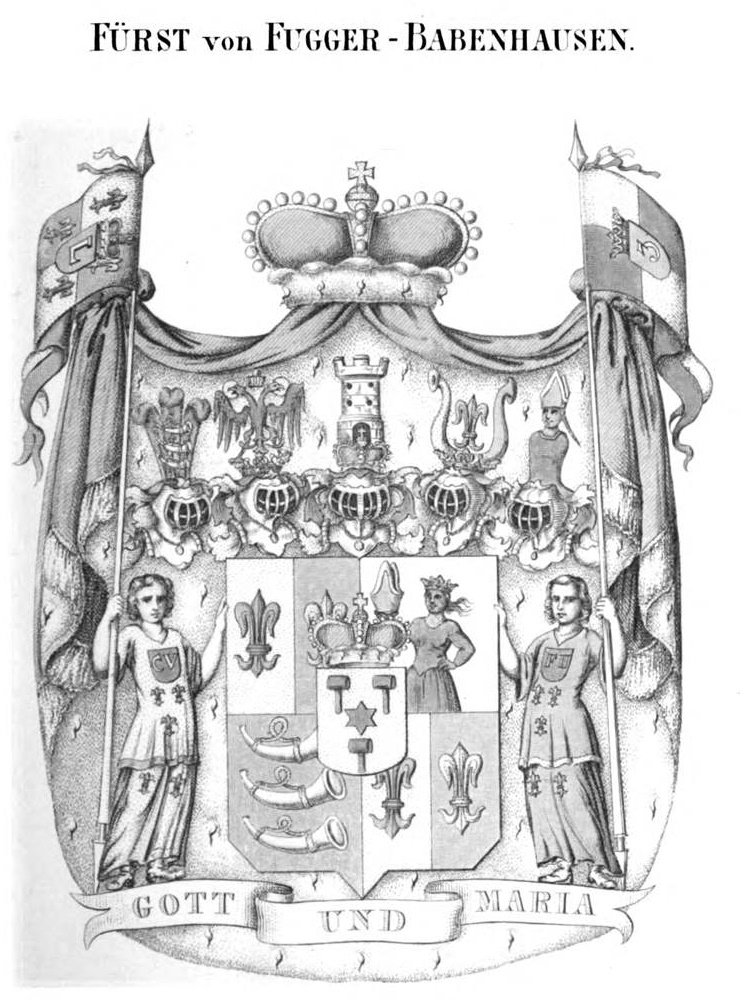
Coat of arms of the Princes of Fugger-Babenhausen

Karl Georg Ferdinand Jakob Maria, 5th Prince Fugger of Babenhausen (15 January 1861 – 5 July 1925) was an Austrian landowner and officer. After serving in various Hussar regiments, he commanded the 3rd Hussar Regiment as Colonel during World War I. A member of the high nobility in the Kingdom of Bavaria as a Mediatized Sovereign Prince of the Empire, he was made chamberlain at the Viennese imperial court and from 1906 until his death, was the head of the House of Fugger-Babenhausen, Lord of Boos, Heimertingen, Wald, Wellenburg, Burgwalden, and Markt.

== Early life ==
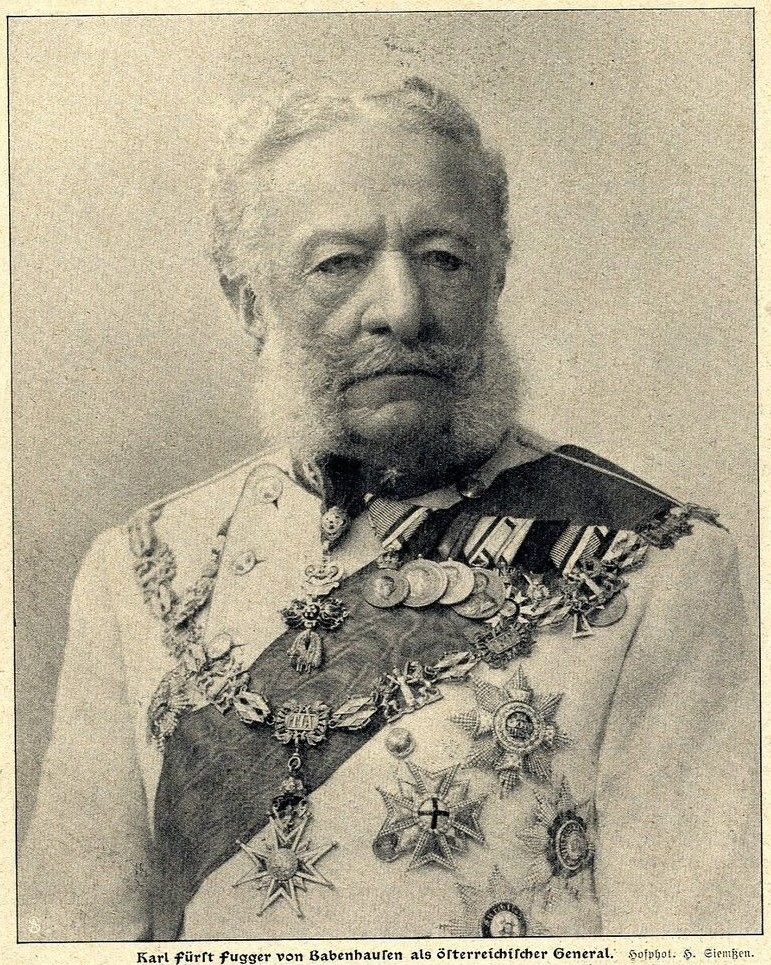
Photograph of his father as Austrian Major General, 1906

Fugger von Babenhausen, who was known as "Cary", was born on 15 January 1861 in Klagenfurt. He was the son of Countess Friederike von Christalnigg von und zu Gillitzstein (1832–1888) and Karl Ludwig, 4th Prince Fugger von Babenhausen (1829–1906), First President of the Chamber of Imperial Councillors. In 1885, his father succeeded his childless older brother, Leopold, 3rd Prince Fugger von Babenhausen, as the sovereign 4th Prince. His sister, Countess Marie, was the wife of Count Christoph von Wydenbruck, Ambassador of Austria-Hungary to Madrid.

His paternal grandparents were Anton, 2nd Prince Fugger von Babenhausen (son of Anselm, 1st Prince Fugger von Babenhausen who was made an Imperial Prince in 1803) and Princess Franziska of Hohenlohe-Bartenstein und Jagstberg (a daughter of Charles Joseph, 1st Prince of Hohenlohe-Jagstberg).

== Career ==
Like his father, he was an Austrian officer and as chamberlain of Emperor Franz Joseph I at the court in Vienna. At the time of the death of his uncle, Prince Leopold in 1885, he was serving as a Lieutenant in the 12th Uhlan Regiment. From 1887 to 1894, he served with the 9th Hussar Regiment in Ödenburg. In 1894, he was transferred to the 11th Hussar Regiment in Steinamanger.

In summer 1908, Prince Fugger von Babenhausen transferred from the 8th Hussar Regiment to the 6th Hussar Regiment with the rank of captain. On 1 June 1909, he took over command of the 1st Seebach Division with the rank of major. In November 1914 after the outbreak of World War I, he was promoted to Colonel. In 1915 he was transferred from the 6th Hussar Regiment to the 3rd Hussar Regiment, whose command he took over. After the end of the war, he retired from active military service in Carinthia.

=== Gambling addiction ===
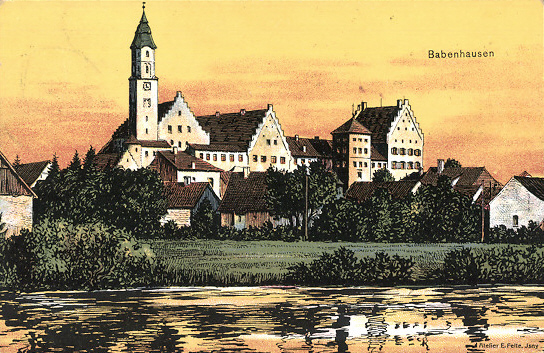
Fugger Castle, 1910

As hereditary count, Karl Georg was entitled to succeed his father in the Bavarian Chamber of Imperial Councillors, but he developed a gambling addiction at a young age. Between 1885 and 1905, he squandered over a million marks that he had received in the form of allowances and gifts, and also gambled away loans totaling around 1.5 million marks at the Vienna Jockey Club. As a result, in 1905, at the instigation of the Fugger family senior council, the Augsburg district court declared him incapacitated "for extravagance" and personally stripped him of his title as hereditary Imperial Councillor. Count Carl Ernst Fugger von Glött was appointed his guardian. (Note: In 1914, Count Carl Ernst Fugger von Kirchheim-Glött-Oberndorf (1859–1940) became Prince Fugger von Glött.) After the death of his father in 1906, he was not introduced as his successor to the Bavarian Imperial Council with the hereditary Imperial Councillorship of the House of Fugger-Babenhausen suspended during his lifetime.

Although he formally became his father's successor as prince, head of the Babenhausen nobles and the princely entail, he could neither carry out the related legal transactions nor take up the hereditary seat in the Bavarian Imperial Council. Therefore, his social life remained in Austria, where the ancestral seat of his mother's family, Meiselberg Castle, was also located in Carinthia. In 1905, he had the Bannacker estate in Augsburg renovated, where his wife tried her hand at breeding polo horses. In 1906, however, his wife and children moved from Vienna to Fugger Castle in Babenhausen because, according to the testamentary provisions, the assets of the second-generation could not otherwise have been passed on to their son Leopold.

== Personal life ==
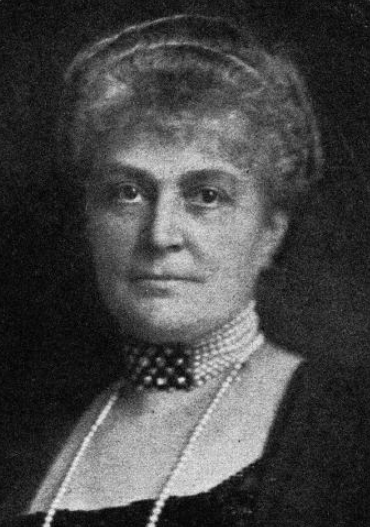
Photograph of his wife, Princess Eleonora Fugger von Babenhausen, 1918

On 8 January 1887 in Vienna, he married Austrian noblewoman and salonnière, Princess Eleonore of Hohenlohe-Bartenstein (1864–1945), the third child of Prince Carl zu Hohenlohe-Bartenstein and Princess Rosa Karoline née Countess von Sternberg. Her two elder siblings were Princess Marie and Prince Johannes (who married Archduchess Anna Maria Theresia of Austria, a daughter of Ferdinand IV, Grand Duke of Tuscany and sister of Luise, Crown Princess of Saxony). Together, they were the parents of:

- Friederike Maria Carolina Henriette Rosa Sabina Franziska Pauline Fugger von Babenhausen (1887–1949), who married Sir Adrian Carton de Wiart in 1908.
- Georg Constantin Heinrich Carl Friedrich Maria Fugger von Babenhausen (1889–1934), who married Countess Elisabeth von Plessen in 1914.
- Sylvia Rosa Eleonore Leopoldine Karolina Maria Fugger von Babenhausen (1892–1949), who married Count Friedrich zu Münster, son of Prince Alexander Münster and Lady Muriel Hay (a daughter of the 12th Earl of Kinnoull), in 1925. They divorced in 1928.
- Leopold Heinrich Karl Friedrich Maria Fugger von Babenhausen (1893–1966), who married Countess Vera Czernin von und zu Chudenitz in 1924. The divorced in 1936 and she married Chancellor Kurt Schuschnigg.
- Maria Theresia Karoline Gigina Fugger von Babenhausen (1899–1994), who married Prince Heinrich von Hanau und Horowitz, a grandson of Frederick William, Elector of Hesse.
- Helene Aloysia Eleonore Maria Fugger von Babenhausen (1908–1915), who died young.

After a long illness, Prince Fugger von Babenhausen died in the sanatorium of the Sisters of the Cross in Klagenfurt on 5 July 1925. He was buried in family plot at St. Michael am Zollfeld in Austria.

=== Incident at Hotel Bristol ===
On 1 January 1908, Prince Karl Georg was at a New Year's party with his wife at the Hotel Bristol in Vienna when Frida Strindberg, the divorced wife of the writer August Strindberg, pointed a pistol at Prince Karl Georg and fired it during a scandalous scene after loud accusations were directed at him. Although the confiscated weapon was loaded, he was unharmed. As was recorded in the course of a court hearing, Prince Karl Georg became acquainted with Frida at a party hosted by Katharina Schratt while he was still hereditary count. His engagement to Princess Eleonora in the spring of 1886 had already been delayed by a brief romance with Mary Vetsera; his wife commented on this succinctly in her memoirs: "It was a close call and my dear cousin would have fallen into the trap of the seductive little mermaid, but it never came to that. He returned to me repentant, and the reconciliation ended beautifully when I became engaged to him... Only one thing was going through my head at that time: I should marry an exceptionally handsome and cheerful man; I would probably have to share him with others. But I accepted the idea and preferred him to someone less handsome, whom I would probably have kept for myself."
