= Fuggerhäuser =

Housing complex in Augsburg, Germany

Coordinates: 48°21′57″N 10°53′56″E

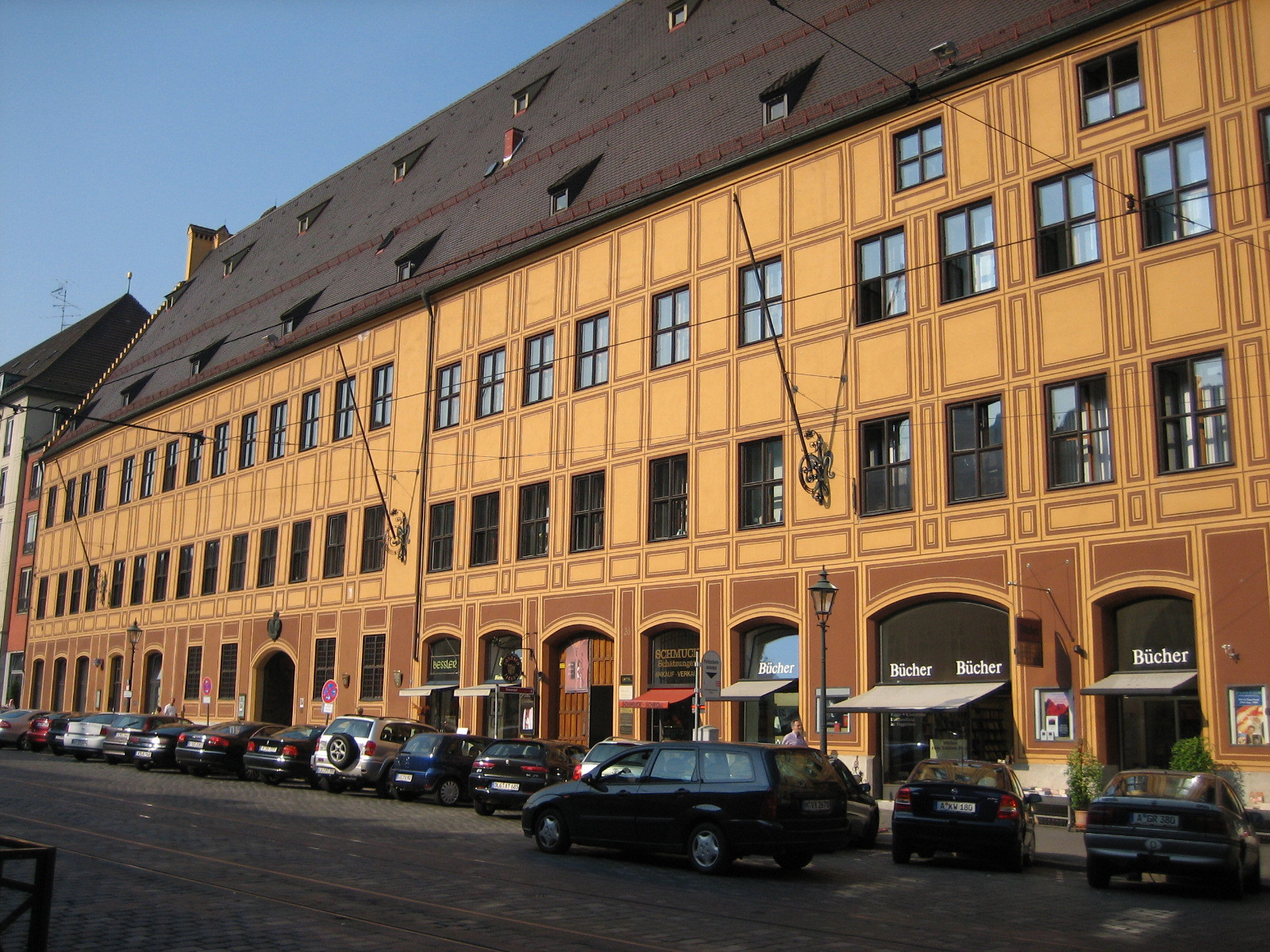
Fugger houses

The Fuggerhäuser (Fugger houses) is a complex of houses on the Maximilianstraße in Augsburg, Germany, built for the Fugger family of businessmen. It is now owned by the Fugger-Babenhausen branch of the Fugger family who resides at Wellenburg castle in Augsburg and in Babenhausen, Bavaria.

== Buildings ==
From 1512 to 1515 Jakob Fugger the Younger (or the Rich) built two linked houses on the Via Claudia (now Maximilianstraße) near the wine market, one as a town-house and the other as a warehouse. He designed them himself, based on notes he had taken on his travels in Italy. The secular building was the first Renaissance style building constructed north of the Alps. He bought other neighbouring houses from 1517 onwards and integrated them into the complex.

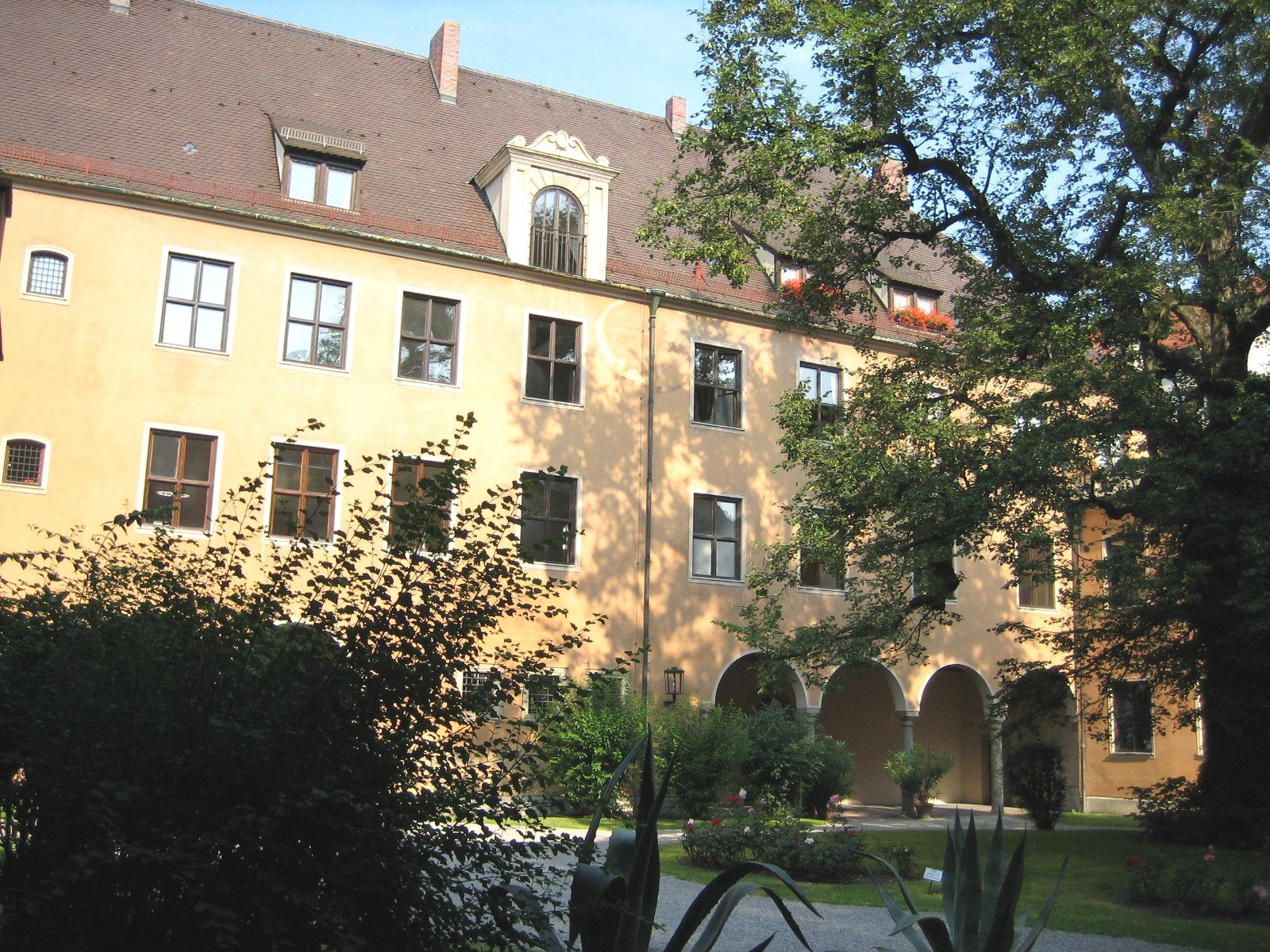
Reiterhof

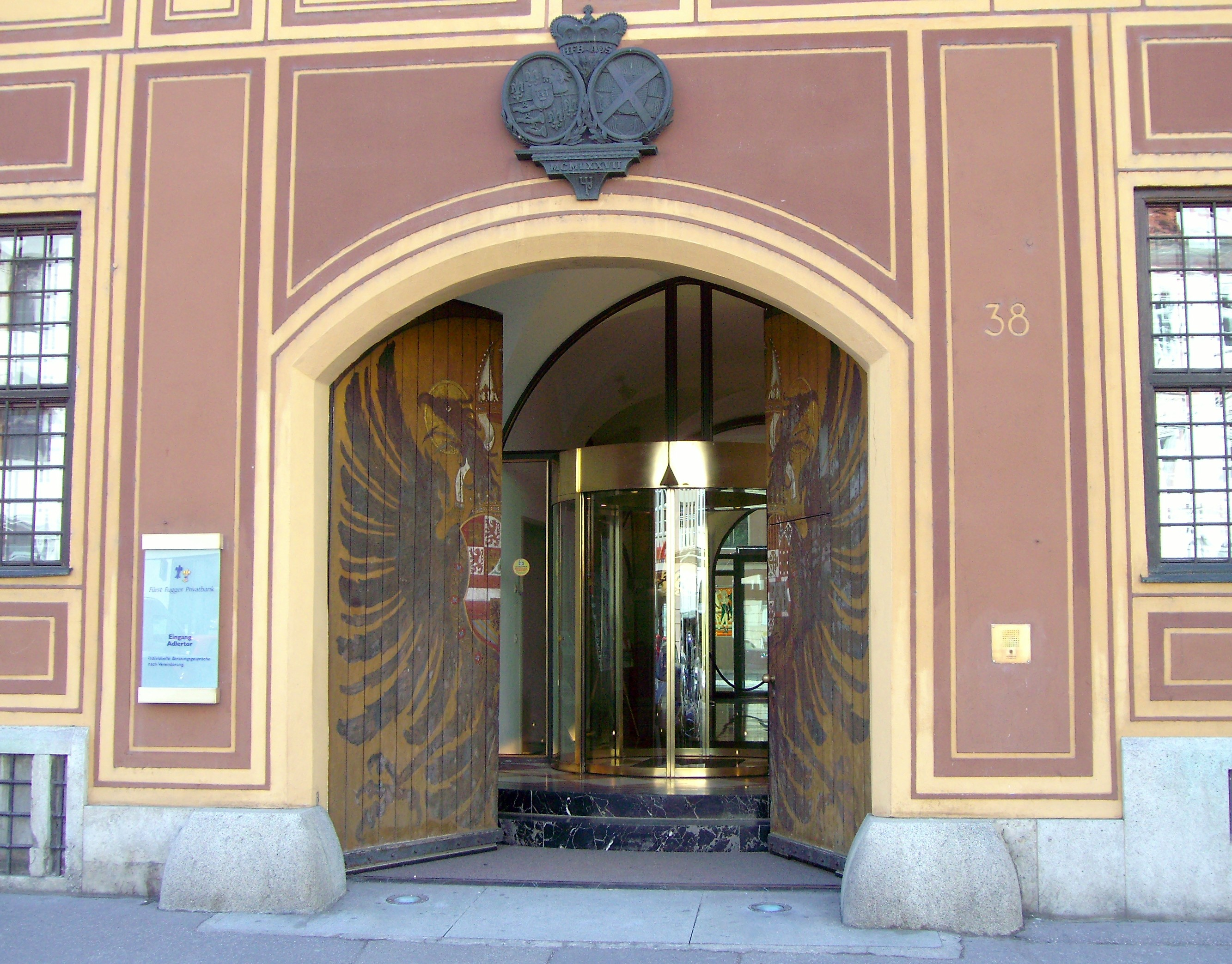
Adlertor, now the entrance to the Fürst Fugger Privatbank

The outer facade, one of the longest on Maximilianstraße, showed the Fugger family riches, since there was a tax paid according to the length of a house's facade. Inside the complex Jakob created four courtyards with arcades, mosaics, tuscan marble and water basins. The Damenhof, with its Tuscan columns supporting arcades and painted arches, was designed as a family garden for female members of the family. The Zofenhof opens off the Damenhof, whilst the third and fourth courtyard (the Serenadenhof and Reiterhof) abut each other at the back of the building. Larger teams of horses could enter the complex through a high and wide gate - the Adlertor (Eagle Gate) - and leave through another on the Reiterhof.

== Today ==
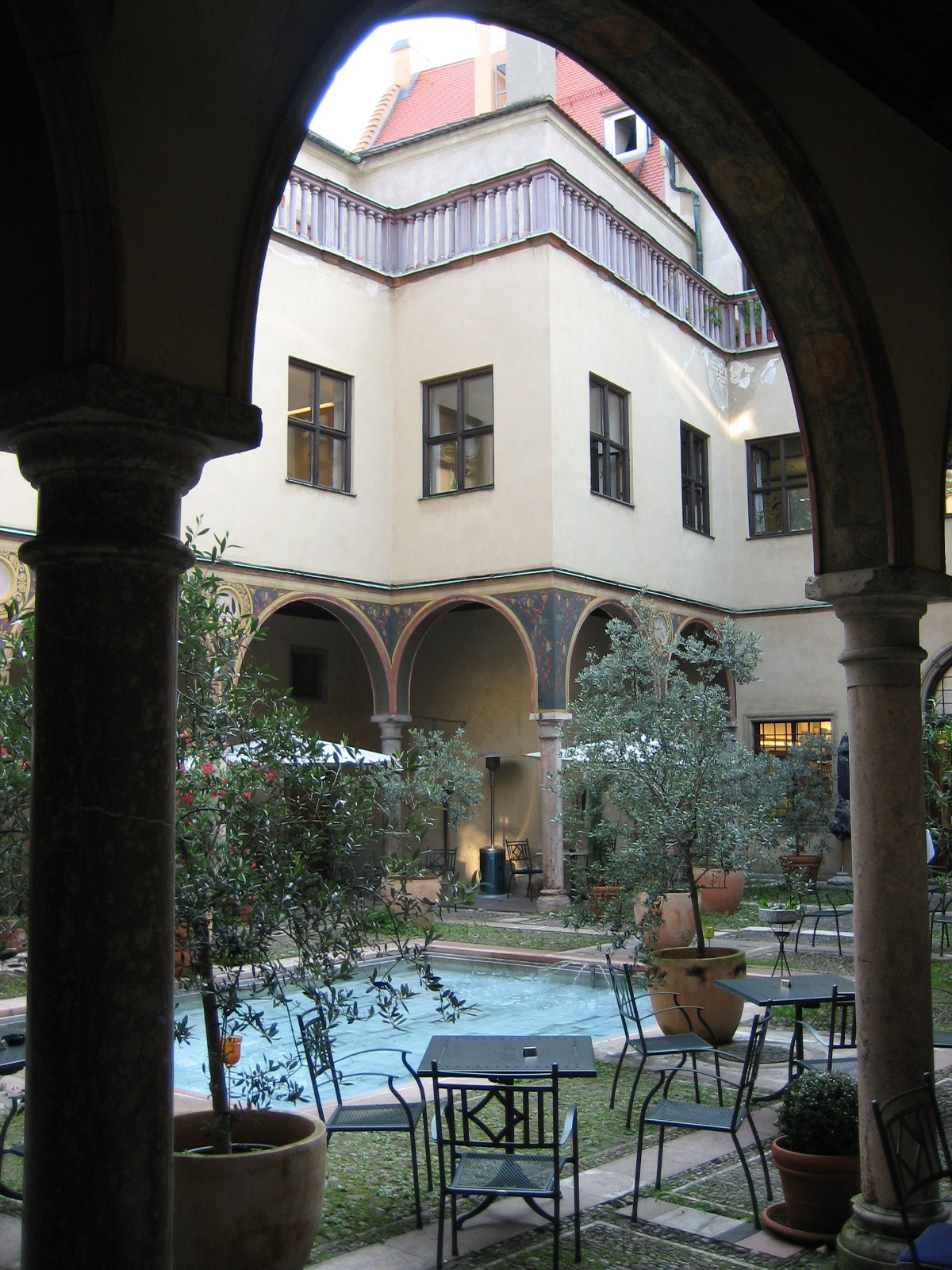
View of the Damenhof

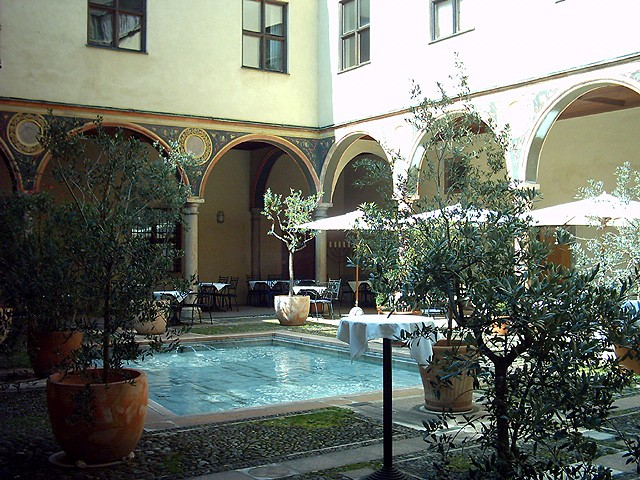
Damenhof

After being destroyed in the Second World War, the complex was rebuilt in 1951 by Carl Fürst Fugger-Babenhausen. The front facade used to feature a fresco by Hans Burgkmair, which was destroyed in the Second World War and replaced by a new livery. Plaques there recall the Fugger business empire and the events of 1518, when Martin Luther was interrogated by Thomas Cajetan in the Fuggerhäuser. In the middle of the facade is the Adlertor, which indicates that the Fuggerhäuser was an imperial residence - this gate now leads to the headquarters of the Fürst Fugger Privatbank.

The building is closed to the public, other than three of the inner courtyards and a three-naved hall on the ground floor of the Adlertor, which houses a bookshop at #37 Maximillianstrasse, where visitors to the shop can look onto the Damenhof. On the north side of the Damenhof and Serenadenhof is the white bay window into the quarters occupied by Charles V, Holy Roman Emperor. A Fugger coat of arms features on the back facade of the Fuggerhäuser on Zeugplatz. The Fugger concert hall was probably in this area - Wolfgang Amadeus Mozart played a concert in that hall in 1777.
