= Maximilianstraße (Augsburg) =

Coordinates: 48°21′55″N 10°53′58″E

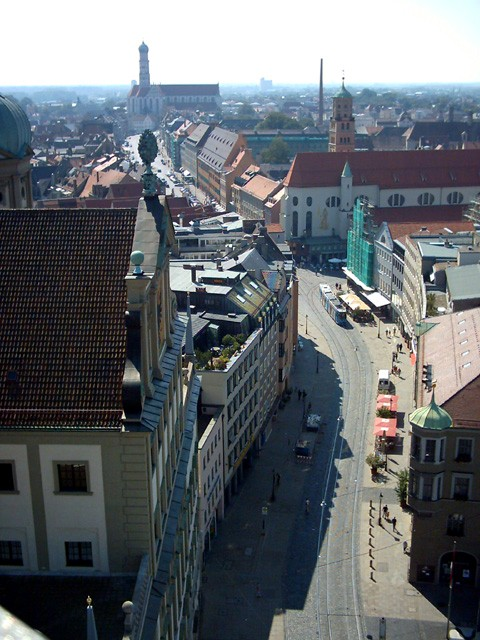

The Maximilianstraße is a street in the old-town area of Augsburg in Germany. It is one of the city's most historic streets and is the site of the Fuggerhäuser.
