= Princess Eleonora Fugger von Babenhausen =

Austrian princess (1864–1945)

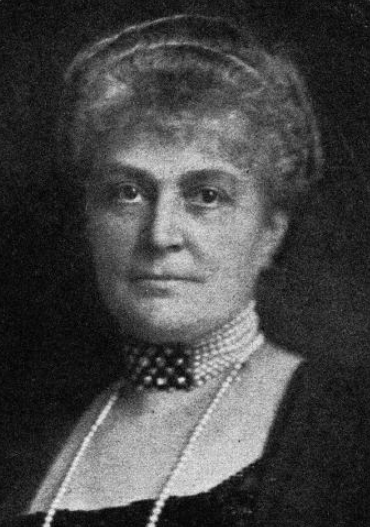
- Princess Eleonora in 1918
- Born: 4 October 1864; Bartenstein, Austria-Hungary
- Died: 1 March 1945 (aged 80); Vienna, Austria
- Occupations: Noblewoman, socialite, chronicler/memoirist
- Spouse(s): Karl, 5th Prince Fugger von Babenhausen

Princess Eleonora Fugger von Babenhausen (October 4, 1864 in Bartenstein — March 1, 1945 in Vienna) was an Austrian noblewoman, socialite and chronicler of the House of Fugger. She is also known as Nora Fugger in her autobiography.

== Early life ==
Eleonore Aloysia Maria was born Princess zu Hohenlohe-Bartenstein, as the third child of Prince Carl zu Hohenlohe-Bartenstein and his wife Princess Rosa Karoline née Countess von Sternberg. She had two elder siblings: Princess Marie and Prince Johannes, who was married to Archduchess Anna Maria Theresia of Austria, a daughter of Ferdinand IV, Grand Duke of Tuscany and sister of Luise, Crown Princess of Saxony, in 1901.

== Marriage and issue ==
Eleonora married Karl, 5th Prince Fugger von Babenhausen on January 8, 1887, in Vienna. Her husband was chamberlain to the Emperor Franz Joseph I of Austria. Together, they were the parents of two sons and four daughters:

- Friederike Maria Carolina Henriette Rosa Sabina Franziska Pauline Fugger von Babenhausen (1887–1949), who married Sir Adrian Carton de Wiart in 1908.
- Georg Constantin Heinrich Carl Friedrich Maria Fugger von Babenhausen (1889–1934), who married Countess Elisabeth von Plessen in 1914.
- Sylvia Rosa Eleonore Leopoldine Karolina Maria Fugger von Babenhausen (1892–1949), who married Count Friedrich zu Münster, son of Prince Alexander Münster and Lady Muriel Hay (a daughter of the 12th Earl of Kinnoull), in 1925. They divorced in 1928.
- Leopold Heinrich Karl Friedrich Maria Fugger von Babenhausen (1893–1966), who married Countess Vera Czernin von und zu Chudenitz in 1924. They divorced in 1936 and she married Chancellor Kurt Schuschnigg.
- Maria Theresia Karoline Gigina Fugger von Babenhausen (1899–1994), who married Prince Heinrich von Hanau und Horowitz, a grandson of Frederick William, Elector of Hesse.
- Helene Aloysia Eleonore Maria Fugger von Babenhausen (1908–1915), who died young.

Her memoirs are filled with stories about the upper classes of the Austro-Hungarian empire.

== Literature ==
- Nora Fugger. The Glory of the Habsburgs: The memoirs of Princess Fugger. G.C. Harrap (1932) ASIN B00085SJMS
