= Fürst Fugger Privatbank =

German regional bank in Augsburg

- Formerly: Friedl & Dumler GmbH
- Company type: AG
- Industry: Financial services
- Founded: 1954
- Headquarters: Augsburg, Germany
- Products: Retail banking and commercial banking serving the Swabia region
- Number of employees: 141
- Website: fuggerbank.de

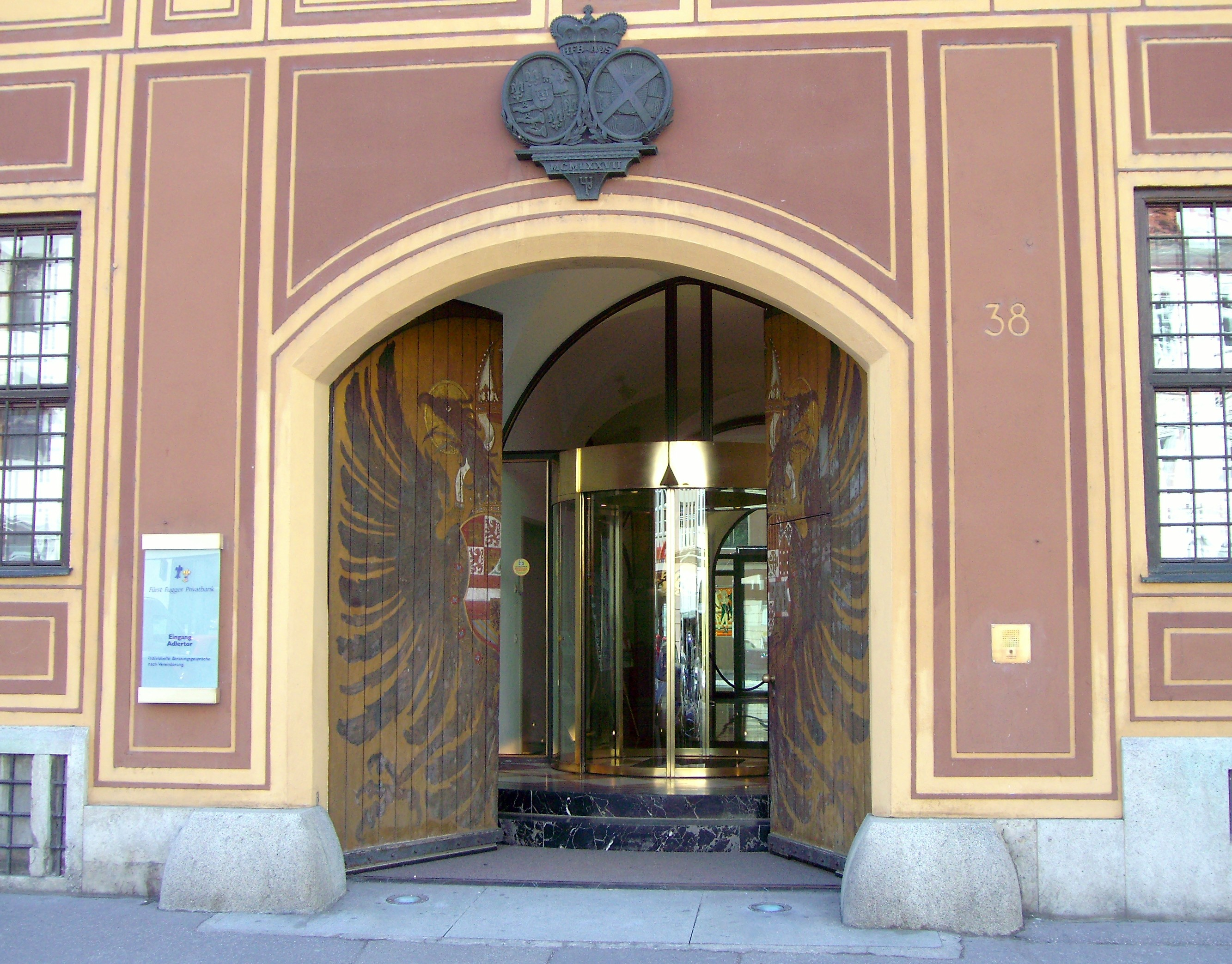
The Eagle's Gate, now the entrance to the Fürst Fugger Privatbank at the Fugger houses in Augsburg

Fürst Fugger Privatbank is a small German regional bank in Augsburg, founded in 1954 and mainly serving the Swabian region of Bavaria, with 141 employees. Its name refers to the historical Fugger banking house that ceased to exist in the 17th century, but the companies have no relation.

== History ==
Fürst Fugger Privatbank was founded when Friedrich Carl Fürst Fugger-Babenhausen acquired the small bank Friedl & Dumler GmbH in 1954. However, the bank only received its current name in 1994. Since 1999, Fürst Fugger Privatbank has been majority owned by the Nürnberger Versicherungsgruppe insurance company, although prince Hubertus Fugger-Babenhausen still holds a stake. He also owns the Fuggerhäuser in Augsburg, where the bank has its main seat.

== See also ==
- List of banks in Germany
