= Johan Sparre af Söfdeborg =

Swedish count and general (1715–1791)

Johan Sparre af Söfdeborg (10 January 1715, Karlskrona – 3 March 1791, Tosterup) was a Swedish count and general.

Sparre was the son of Admiral Claes Sparre and was born in 1715. After service in French and Austrian armies he was appointed a colonel in the Swedish Army in 1759 and given command of a regiment. During the 1757-1763 Pomeranian War he was commended for his defence of Anklam and actions at Friedland and Dresden. After the Revolution of 1772 he became adjutant-general to Gustav III; that same year he was promoted to the rank of major-general in 1772 and made commandant of Suomenlinna. In 1778 he was promoted to lieutenant-general. In 1788 he was recalled from retirement by Gustav III to take command of the defences of Gothenburg during the Theatre War with Denmark. He died in March 1791.
