= Adrian Carton de Wiart =

British Army officer (1880–1963)

Lieutenant-General Sir Adrian Carton de Wiart VC KBE CB CMG DSO
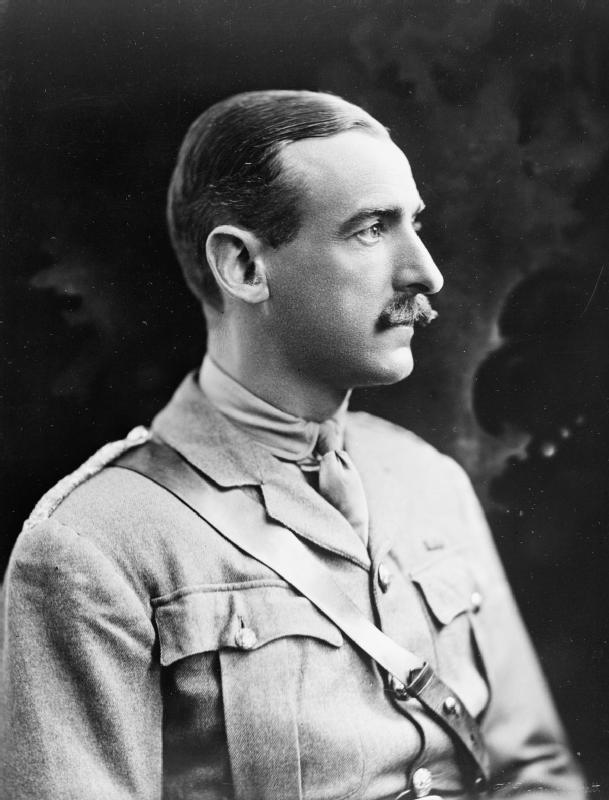
- Carton de Wiart as a lieutenant-colonel during the First World War
- Born: Adrian Paul Ghislain Carton de Wiart; 5 May 1880; Brussels, Belgium
- Died: 5 June 1963 (aged 83); Aghinagh House, Killinardrish, County Cork, Ireland
- Burial place: Killinardish Churchyard, County Cork, Ireland
- Military career
- Allegiance: United Kingdom
- Branch: British Army
- Service years: 1899–1923; 1939–1947
- Rank: Lieutenant-General
- Service number: 836
- Commands: 61st Infantry Division; 134th Brigade; 12th Brigade; 8th (Service) Battalion, Gloucestershire Regiment
- Conflicts: Second Boer War; Dervish War; First World War; Battle of the Somme; Battle of Arras; Battle of Passchendaele; Battle of Cambrai; Polish–Ukrainian War; Polish–Soviet War; Polish–Lithuanian War; Second World War; Invasion of Poland; Second Sino-Japanese War; Norwegian campaign
- Awards: Victoria Cross; Knight Commander of the Order of the British Empire; Companion of the Order of the Bath; Companion of the Order of St Michael and St George; Distinguished Service Order; Mentioned in Despatches; Virtuti Militari (Poland); Croix de guerre (Belgium); Legion of Honour (France); Croix de Guerre (France)

Lieutenant-General Sir Adrian Paul Ghislain Carton de Wiart, VC, KBE, CB, CMG, DSO (/də ˈwaɪ.ərt/; 5 May 1880 – 5 June 1963) was a British Army officer of Belgian and Irish descent. He was awarded the Victoria Cross, the highest military decoration awarded for valour "in the face of the enemy" in various Commonwealth countries. He served in the Boer War, First World War, and Second World War. He was shot in the face, head, stomach, groin, ankle, leg, hip, and ear. A bullet took out his left eye, he survived two plane crashes, tunnelled out of a prisoner-of-war camp, and ripped off his own severely injured fingers when a doctor declined to amputate them. Describing his experiences in the First World War, he wrote, "Frankly, I had enjoyed the war."

After returning home from service (including a period as a prisoner-of-war) in the Second World War, he was sent to China as Winston Churchill's personal representative. While en route he attended the Cairo Conference.

In his memoirs, Carton de Wiart wrote, "Governments may think and say as they like, but force cannot be eliminated, and it is the only real and unanswerable power. We are told that the pen is mightier than the sword, but I know which of these weapons I would choose." Carton de Wiart was thought to be a model for the character of Brigadier Ben Ritchie-Hook in Evelyn Waugh's trilogy Sword of Honour. The Oxford Dictionary of National Biography described him thus: "With his black eyepatch and empty sleeve, Carton de Wiart looked like an elegant pirate, and became a figure of legend."

== Early life ==
=== Background ===
Carton de Wiart was born into an aristocratic family in Brussels, on 5 May 1880, as the eldest son of Léon Constant Ghislain Carton de Wiart (1854–1915), a lawyer and magistrate, and Ernestine Wenzig (1860–1943), although at the time he was widely believed to be an illegitimate son of King Leopold II of the Belgians. He spent his early days in Belgium and in England; the 'loss of his mother' when he was six prompted his father to move the family to Cairo so his father could practice at Egypt's mixed courts. This led early biographers to assume that his mother had died in 1886; however, in later research it was established that his parents had divorced in that year and that his mother remarried Demosthenes Gregory Cuppa later in 1886. In his position as a lawyer, magistrate and a director of the Cairo Electric Railways and Heliopolis Oases Company, his father was well connected in Egyptian governmental circles. Adrian Carton de Wiart learned to speak Arabic.

Carton de Wiart was a Roman Catholic. In 1891, his English stepmother sent him to a boarding school in England, the Roman Catholic Oratory School, founded by John Henry Newman. From there, he went to Balliol College, Oxford, but left around 1899, just before or during the Second Boer War, to join the British Army. He falsified his name and age, signing up as "Trooper Carton" in Paget's Horse and claiming to be 25 years old where his actual age was no more than 20.

=== Second Boer War ===
Carton de Wiart was wounded in the stomach and groin in South Africa early in the Second Boer War and was invalided home. His father was furious when he learned his son had abandoned his studies, but allowed him to remain in the army. After another brief period at Oxford, where Aubrey Herbert was among his friends, he was given a commission in the Second Imperial Light Horse. He saw action in South Africa again, and on 14 September 1901 was given a regular commission as a second lieutenant in the 4th Dragoon Guards. Carton de Wiart was transferred to India in 1902. He enjoyed sports, especially shooting and pig sticking.

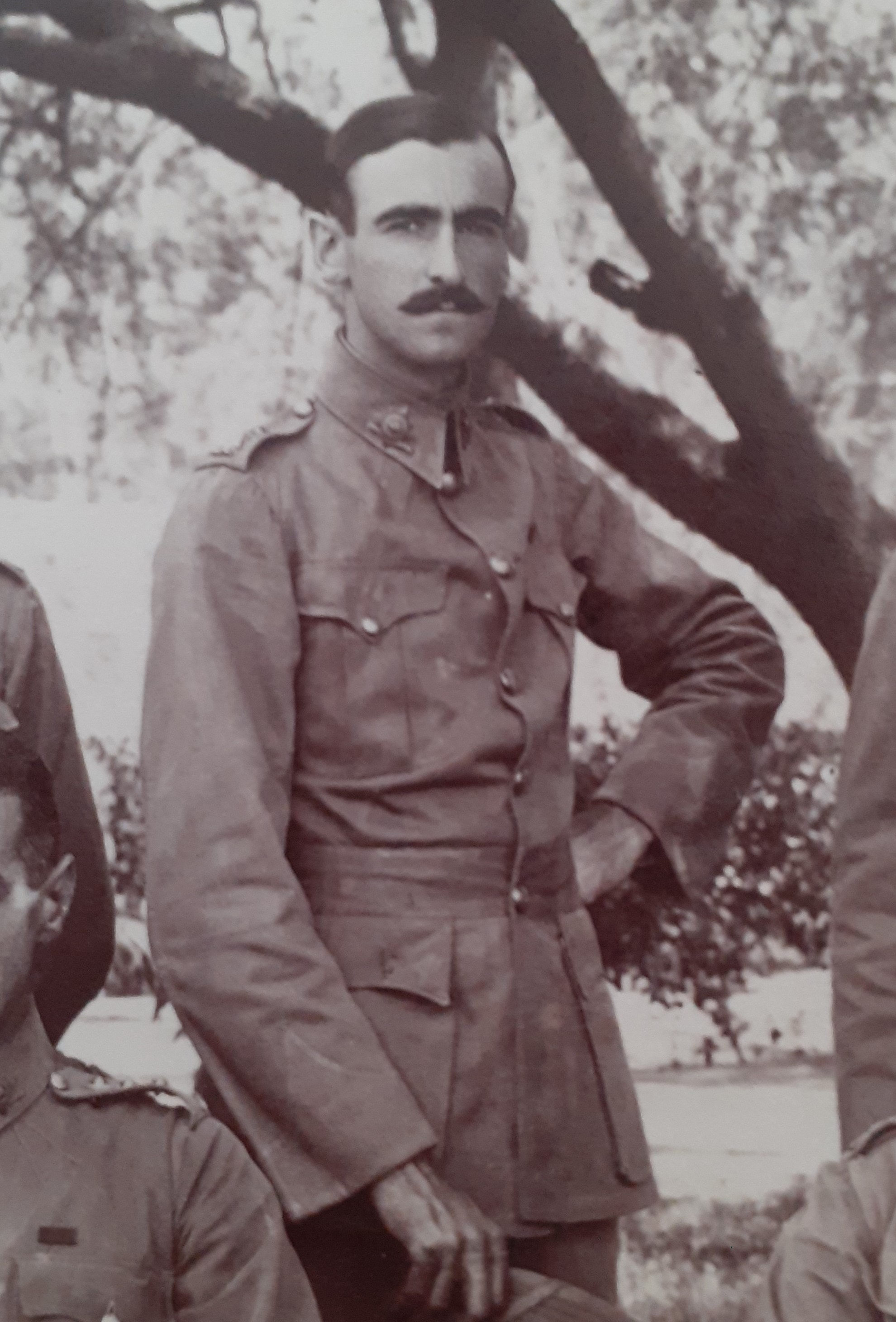
Carton de Wiart as a lieutenant with the 4th Dragoon Guards at Muttra in September 1904

== Character, interests and life in the Edwardian army ==
Carton de Wiart's serious wound in the Boer War instilled in him a strong desire for physical fitness and he ran, jogged, walked and played sports on a regular basis. In male company he was "a delightful character and must hold the world record for bad language".

After his regiment was transferred to South Africa he was promoted to lieutenant on 16 July 1904 and appointed an aide-de-camp to the commander-in-chief, Lieutenant General Sir Henry Hildyard, the following July. He describes this period lasting up to 1914 as his "Heyday", the title of Chapter 3 of his autobiography. His light duties as aide-de-camp gave him time for polo, another of his interests. By 1907, although by then having served in the British Army for eight years, he had remained a Belgian subject. On 13 September of that year, he took the oath of allegiance to Edward VII and was formally naturalised as a British subject.

In 1908, he married Countess Friederike Maria Karoline Henriette Rosa Sabina Franziska Fugger von Babenhausen (1887 Klagenfurt – 1949 Vienna), the eldest daughter of Karl, 5th Prince Fugger von Babenhausen and Princess Eleonora zu Hohenlohe-Bartenstein und Jagstberg of Klagenfurt, Austria. They had two daughters; the eldest, Anita (born 1909), was to be the maternal grandmother of the war correspondent Anthony Loyd (born 1966).

Carton de Wiart was already well-connected in European circles, his two closest cousins being Count Henri Carton de Wiart, Prime Minister of Belgium from 1920 to 1921, and Baron Edmond Carton de Wiart, political secretary to the King of Belgium and director of La Société Générale de Belgique. While on leave, he travelled extensively throughout central Europe, using his Catholic aristocratic connections to shoot at country estates in Bohemia, Austria, Hungary and Bavaria. Following his return to England, he rode with the famous Duke of Beaufort's Hunt where he met, among others, the future field marshal Sir Henry Maitland Wilson and the future air marshal Sir Edward Ellington. He was promoted to the rank of captain on 26 February 1910. The Duke of Beaufort was the honorary colonel of the Royal Gloucestershire Hussars, and from 1 January 1912 until his departure for Somaliland in 1914 Carton de Wiart served as the regiment's adjutant.

== First World War ==
=== Dervish war ===
When the First World War broke out, Carton de Wiart was en route to British Somaliland where a low-level war was underway against the followers of the Dervish haroun, including leader Mohammed bin Abdullah, called the "Mad Mullah" by the British. Carton de Wiart had been seconded to the Somaliland Camel Corps. In an attack upon an enemy fort at Shimber Berris, Carton de Wiart was shot twice in the face, losing his eye and a portion of his ear. He was awarded the Distinguished Service Order (DSO) on 15 May 1915. Upon hearing of the death of the "Mad Mullah", Carton de Wiart stated that he "felt a sense of real personal loss", for the "Mad Mullah" was "a godsend to officers with an urge to fight and a shaky or non-existent bank balance".

=== Western Front ===
In February 1915, he embarked on a steamer heading for France. Carton de Wiart took part in the fighting on the Western Front, commanding successively three infantry battalions and a brigade. He was wounded seven more times in the war, losing his left hand in 1915 and pulling off his fingers when a doctor declined to remove them. He was shot through the skull and ankle at the Battle of the Somme, through the hip at the Battle of Passchendaele, through the leg at Cambrai and through the ear at Arras. He went to the Sir Douglas Shield's Nursing Home to recover from his injuries.

=== Victoria Cross ===
Carton de Wiart received the Victoria Cross (VC), the highest award for gallantry in combat against the enemy that can be awarded to British Empire forces, in 1916. He was 36 years old and a temporary lieutenant-colonel in the 4th Dragoon Guards (Royal Irish), British Army, attached to the Gloucestershire Regiment, commanding the 8th Battalion, when the following events took place on 2/3 July 1916, in the opening days of the Battle of the Somme, at La Boiselle, France, as recorded in the official citation:

Capt. (temp. Lt.-Col.) Adrian Carton de Wiart, D.S.O., Dn. Gds. For most conspicuous bravery, coolness and determination during severe operations of a prolonged nature. It was owing in a great measure to his dauntless courage and inspiring example that a serious reverse was averted. He displayed the utmost energy and courage in forcing our attack home. After three other battalion Commanders had become casualties, he controlled their commands, and ensured that the ground won was maintained at all costs. He frequently exposed himself in the organisation of positions and of supplies, passing unflinchingly through fire barrage of the most intense nature. His gallantry was inspiring to all.

— London Gazette, 9 September 1916.

His Victoria Cross is displayed at the National Army Museum in Chelsea.

=== 1916–1918 ===
Carton de Wiart was promoted to temporary major in March 1916, and to the rank of temporary lieutenant colonel on 18 July, was brevetted to major on 1 January 1917 and was promoted to temporary brigadier general on 12 January 1917. He was appointed an Officer of the Order of the Crown of Belgium in April 1917. On 3 June 1917, Carton de Wiart was brevetted to lieutenant-colonel. On 18 July, he was promoted to the substantive rank of major in the Dragoon Guards. He was awarded the Belgian Croix de Guerre in March 1918, and was appointed a Companion of the Order of St Michael and St George in the King's Birthday Honours List in June.

On 8 November, just three days before the end of the war, Carton de Wiart was given command of a brigade with the rank of temporary brigadier general. A.S. Bullock gives a vivid first-hand description of his arrival: 'Cold shivers went down the back of everyone in the brigade, for he had an unsurpassed record as a fire eater, missing no chance of throwing the men under his command into whatever fighting happened to be going.' Bullock recalls how the battalion looked 'very much the worse for wear' when they paraded for the brigadier general's inspection. He arrived 'on a lively cob with his cap tilted at a rakish angle, and a shade over the place where one of his eyes had been'. He was also missing two limbs and had eleven wound stripes. Bullock, the first man in line for the inspection, notes that Carton de Wiart, despite having only one eye, ordered him to get his bootlace changed.

== Post-First World War era and the Polish mission ==
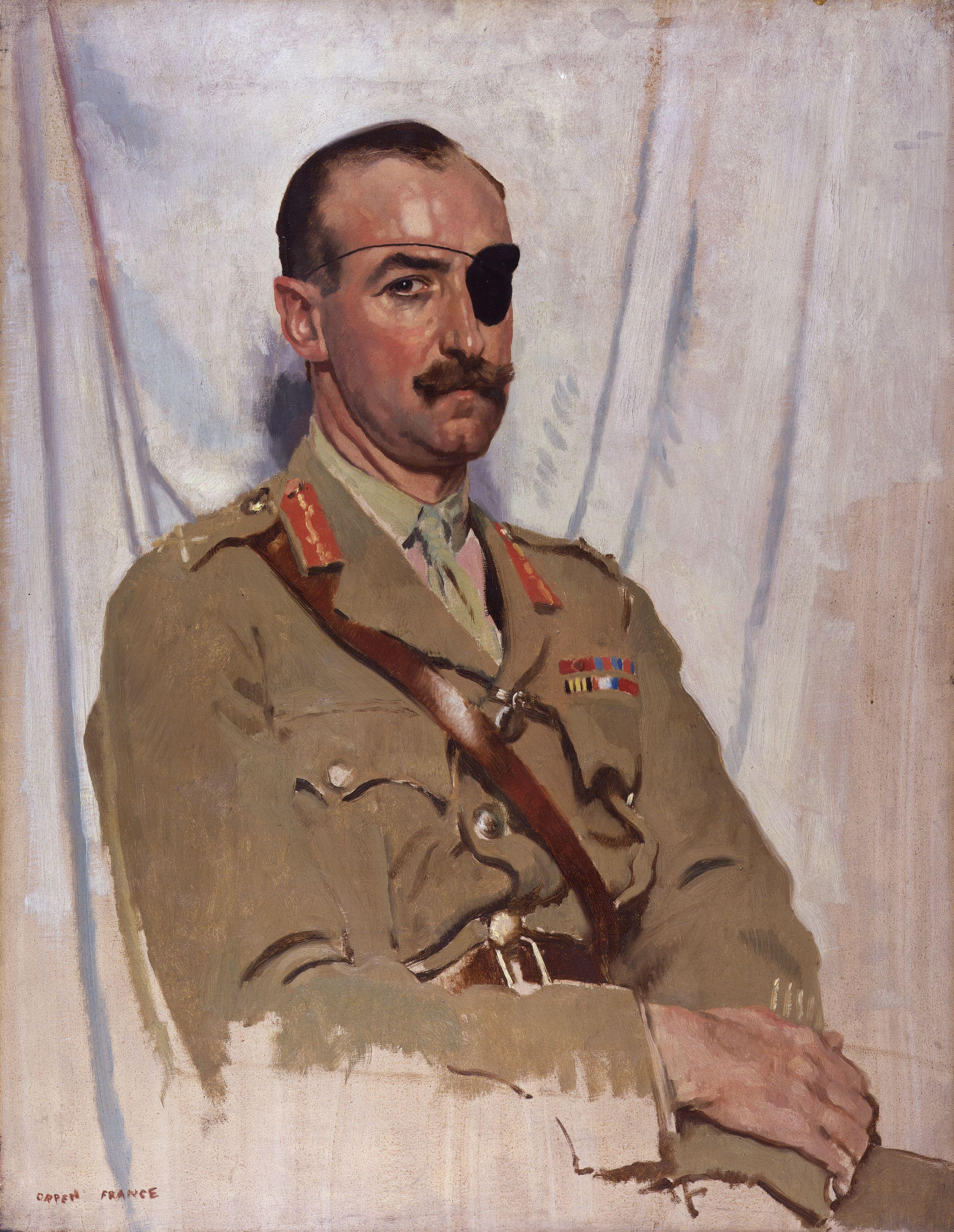
Painting by Sir William Orpen, 1919 (National Portrait Gallery, London)

At the end of the war Carton de Wiart was sent to Poland as second in command of the British-Poland Military Mission under General Louis Botha. Carton de Wiart was appointed a Companion of the Order of the Bath in the 1919 King's Birthday Honours List. After a brief period, he replaced General Botha in the mission to Poland.

Poland desperately needed support, as it was engaged with Bolshevik Russia in the Polish-Soviet War, the Ukrainians in the Polish-Ukrainian War, the Lithuanians in the Polish-Lithuanian War and the Czechs in the Czech-Polish border conflicts. There he met pianist Ignacy Jan Paderewski, Marshal Józef Piłsudski, the Chief of State and military commander and General Maxime Weygand, head of the French military mission in mid-1920. The Ukrainian nationalists under Simon Petlyura were besieging the city of Lwów (Lvov; Lemberg). One of his tasks soon after Carton de Wiart's arrival was to attempt to make peace between the Poles and the Ukrainians; the peace talks were unsuccessful.

From there, he went on to Paris to report to the British Prime Minister, David Lloyd George and to General Sir Henry Wilson, regarding the Polish situation. Lloyd George was not sympathetic to Poland and, much to Carton de Wiart's annoyance, Britain sent next to no military supplies. Then he went back to Poland and many more front line adventures, this time in the Bolshevik zone, where the situation was grave and Warsaw threatened. During this time he had significant interaction with the nuntius (dean of the Vatican diplomatic corps) Cardinal Achille Ratti, later Pius XI, who wanted Carton de Wiart's advice as to whether to evacuate the diplomatic corps from Warsaw. The diplomats moved to Poznań, but the Italians remained in Warsaw along with Ratti.

From all these affairs, Carton de Wiart developed a sympathy with the Poles and supported their claims to eastern Galicia. This caused disagreement with Lloyd George at their next meeting, but was appreciated by the Poles. Norman Davies reports that he (Carton de Wiart) was "compromised in a gun-running operation from Budapest using stolen wagon-lits".

He became close to the Polish leader, Marshal Piłsudski. After an aircraft crash occasioning a brief period in Lithuanian captivity, he went back to England to report, this time to the Secretary of State for War, Winston Churchill. He passed on to Churchill Piłsudski's prediction that the White Russian offensive under General Anton Denikin directed at Moscow would fail, and it did shortly thereafter. Churchill was more sympathetic to Polish needs than Lloyd George and succeeded, over Lloyd George's objections, in sending some materiel to Poland.

On 27 July 1920, Carton de Wiart was appointed an aide-de-camp to the king, and brevetted to colonel. He was active in August 1920, when the Red Army was at the gates of Warsaw. While out on his observation train, he was attacked by a group of Red cavalry, and fought them off with his revolver from the footplate of his train, at one point falling on the track and re-boarding quickly.

When the Poles won the war, the British Military Mission was wound up. Carton de Wiart was promoted to temporary brigadier general and also appointed to the local rank of major general on 1 January. He was promoted to the substantive rank of colonel on 21 June 1922, with seniority from 27 July 1920 and relinquished his local rank of major general on 1 April 1923, going on half-pay as a colonel at the same time. Carton de Wiart officially retired from the army on 19 December, with the honorary rank of major general.

== Interwar years in Poland (1924–1939) ==
After his retirement, his friend Karol Mikołaj Radziwiłł, a member of the princely Radziwiłł family offered him use of a vast estate called Prostyń, in the Pripet Marshes. Carton de Wiart spent the rest of the interwar period there. In his memoirs he wrote: "in my fifteen years in the marshes I did not waste one day without hunting".

As war in Europe approached once more, the UK and Poland entered an alliance and Carton de Wiart was again made head of the British Military Mission.

Later, after the Soviet invasion and occupation of eastern Poland, including the Prostyń estate, Carton de Wiart wrote that "the Bolsheviks...[took] everything I had: shotguns, fishing rods, clothing and furniture. However, they did not manage to take my memories."

== Second World War ==
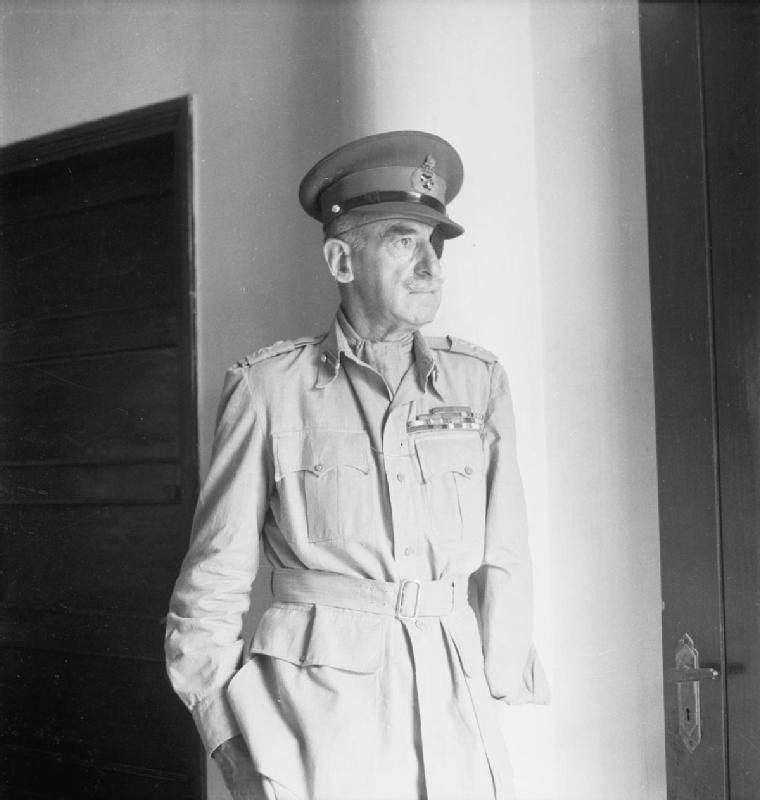
Adrian Carton de Wiart during World War II, photographed by Cecil Beaton

=== Polish campaign (1939) ===
Carton de Wiart met with the Polish commander-in-chief, Marshal of Poland Edward Rydz-Śmigły, in late August 1939; he would later say he was unimpressed by the Marshal's capabilities. He attempted to convince Rydz-Śmigły to pull Polish forces back beyond the Vistula River, but was unsuccessful. He also pushed for destroyers of the Polish Navy to be evacuated from the Baltic Sea. This idea was, after much argument, adopted as the Peking Plan. These ships would form the nucleus of the Polish fleet which fought alongside the allies for the rest of the war.

Germany invaded Poland on 1 September, joined two weeks later by the USSR. As Polish lines collapsed, Carton de Wiart evacuated the British Mission from Warsaw alongside the Polish government and military high command. At the Romanian border, where the Polish Army had retreated, Carton de Wiart again met Rydz-Śmigły. He told the Marshal that if he were willing to stay in Poland and fight, Carton de Wiart would stay with him. He later called Rydz-Śmigły's decision to leave the country "a contradiction of everything I knew about Poles".

Carton de Wiart then crossed into Romania, where he was almost arrested. He escaped by a plane on 21 September using a false passport, the same day pro-Allied Romanian prime minister, Armand Calinescu, was assassinated by members of the fascist Iron Guard with German backing.

=== Norwegian campaign (1940) ===
Recalled to a special appointment in the army in the autumn of 1939, Carton de Wiart reverted to his former rank of colonel and was granted the rank of acting major general on 28 November. After a brief stint in command of the 61st Division in the English Midlands, Carton de Wiart was summoned in April 1940 to take charge of a hastily drawn together Anglo-French force to occupy Namsos, a small town in middle Norway. His orders were to take the city of Trondheim, 125 miles (200 km) to the south, in conjunction with a naval attack and an advance from the south by troops landed at Åndalsnes. He flew to Namsos to reconnoitre the location before the troops arrived. When his Short Sunderland flying boat landed, it was attacked by a German fighter and his aide was wounded and had to be evacuated. After the French Alpine troops landed (without their transport mules and missing straps for their skis), the Luftwaffe bombed and destroyed the town of Namsos.

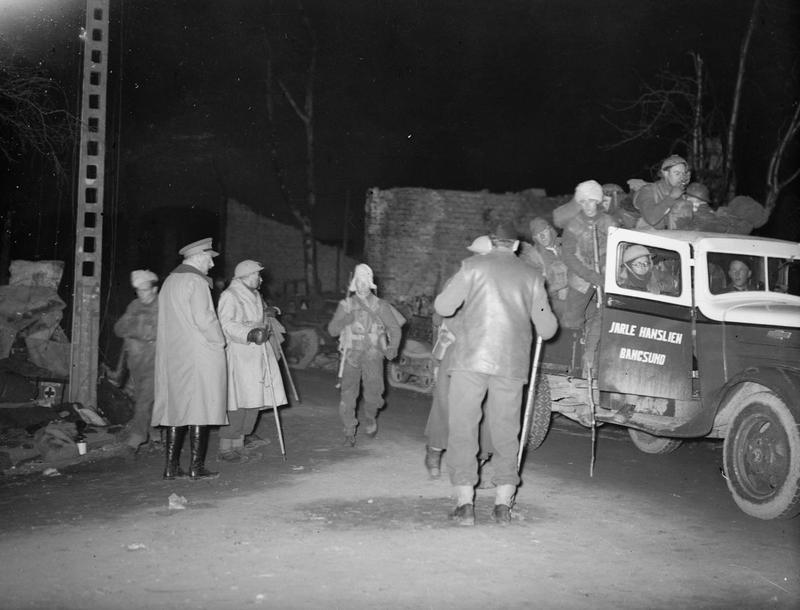
British soldiers on the quay at Namsos awaiting evacuation from Norway. On the left is Major General Carton de Wiart.

Despite these handicaps, Carton de Wiart managed to move his forces over the mountains and down to Trondheimsfjord, where they were shelled by German destroyers. They had no artillery to challenge the German ships. It soon became apparent that the whole Norwegian campaign was fast becoming a failure. The naval attack on Trondheim, the reason for the Namsos landing, did not happen and his troops were exposed without guns, transport, air cover, or skis in a foot and a half of snow. They were being attacked by German ski troops, machine gunned and bombed from the air and the German Navy was landing troops to his rear. He recommended withdrawal but was asked to hold his position for political reasons, which he did.

After orders and counterorders from London, the decision to evacuate was made. However, on the date set to evacuate the troops, the ships did not appear. The next night a naval force finally arrived, led through the fog by Lord Louis Mountbatten. The transports successfully evacuated the entire force amid heavy bombardment by the Germans, resulting in the sinking of two destroyers: the French Bison and British HMS Afridi. Carton de Wiart arrived back at the British naval base of Scapa Flow in the Orkney Islands on 5 May 1940, his 60th birthday.

=== Northern Ireland ===
Carton de Wiart was posted back to the command of the 61st Division, which was soon transferred to Northern Ireland as a defence against invasion. However, following the arrival of Lieutenant-General Sir Henry Pownall as Commander-in-Chief in Northern Ireland, Carton de Wiart was told that he was too old to command a division on active duty.

=== British military mission to Yugoslavia (1941) ===
Carton de Wiart was made a temporary major-general on 28 November 1940. On 5 April 1941 he was ordered to form a British Military Mission to Yugoslavia. The country's pro-Axis government had been overthrown a few days before, and Germany and its allies were preparing an invasion which would begin on 6 April.

Carton de Wiart travelled in a Vickers Wellington bomber, first heading for Cairo to receive orders from General Archibald Wavell. However after a refuelling stop in Malta, both engines failed off the coast of Italian-controlled Libya, and the plane went down about a mile from land. Carton de Wiart was knocked unconscious, but came to in the cold water. When the plane broke up and sank, the crew and passengers were forced to swim to shore, where they were captured by Italian authorities.

=== Prisoner of war in Italy (1941–1943) ===
Carton de Wiart was a high-profile prisoner. After four months at the Villa Orsini at Sulmona, he was transferred to a special prison for senior officers at Castello di Vincigliata. There were a number of senior officer prisoners here due to the successes achieved by Rommel in North Africa early in 1941. Carton de Wiart made friends, especially with General Sir Richard O'Connor, The 6th Earl of Ranfurly, and Lieutenant-General Philip Neame, VC. In letters to his wife, Lord Ranfurly described Carton de Wiart in captivity as "a delightful character" and said he "must hold the record for bad language." Ranfurly was "endlessly amused by him. He really is a nice person – superbly outspoken." The four were committed to escaping. He made five attempts, including seven months tunnelling. Carton de Wiart once evaded capture for eight days disguised as an Italian peasant (he was in northern Italy, could not speak Italian, and was 62 years old, with an eye patch, one empty sleeve and multiple injuries and scars).

Then, in a surprising development, Carton de Wiart was taken from prison in August 1943 and driven to Rome. The Italian government was secretly planning to leave the war and wanted Carton de Wiart to send the message to the British Army about a peace treaty with the UK. Carton de Wiart was to accompany an Italian negotiator, General Giacomo Zanussi, to Lisbon to meet Allied contacts to negotiate the surrender. To keep the mission secret, Carton de Wiart was told he needed civilian clothes. Distrusting Italian tailors, he stated that "[he] had no objection, provided [he] did not resemble a gigolo." In Happy Odyssey, he described the resultant suit as being "as good as anything that ever came out of Savile Row." When they reached Lisbon, Carton de Wiart was released and made his way to England, reaching there on 28 August 1943.

=== China mission (1943–1947) ===
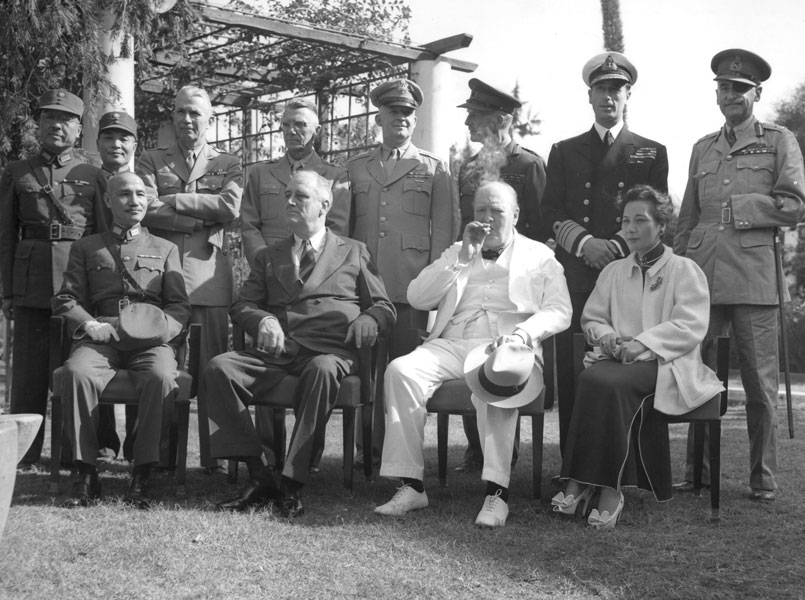
Carton de Wiart in the Cairo Conference, behind Soong Mei-ling on the right. From left to right: Generalissimo Chiang Kai-shek, US President Franklin Delano Roosevelt, British Prime Minister Winston Churchill and Soong Mei-ling. Back row, Chinese Generals Chang Chen and Ling Wei; American Generals Somervell, Stilwell and Arnold; and senior British officers, Field Marshal Sir John Dill, Admiral Lord Louis Mountbatten.

Within a month of his arrival back in England, Carton de Wiart was summoned to spend a night at the prime minister's country home at Chequers. Churchill informed him that he was to be sent to China as his personal representative. He was granted the rank of acting lieutenant-general on 9 October, and left by air for India on 18 October 1943. Anglo-Chinese relations were difficult in World War II as the Kuomintang had long called for the end of British extraterritorial rights in China together with the return of Hong Kong, neither proposal being welcome to Churchill. In early 1942, Churchill had to ask Chiang Kai-shek to send Chinese troops to help the British hold Burma from the Japanese, and following the Japanese conquest of Burma the X Force of five Chinese divisions had ended up in eastern India. Churchill was unhappy with having the X Force defend India as it weakened the prestige of the Raj, and in an attempt to improve relations with China, the prime minister felt a soldier experienced in diplomacy such as Carton de Wiart would be the best man to be his personal representative in China.

As his accommodation in China was not ready, Carton de Wiart spent time in India gaining an understanding of the situation in China, especially being briefed by a genuine tai-pan, John Keswick, head of the great China trading empire Jardine Matheson. He met the Viceroy, Field Marshal Viscount Wavell and General Sir Claude Auchinleck, the Commander-in-Chief in India. He also met Orde Wingate. Before arriving in China, Carton de Wiart attended the 1943 Cairo Conference organised by Churchill, US President Roosevelt and Chinese Generalissimo Chiang Kai-shek.

When in Cairo, he took the opportunity to renew his acquaintance with Hermione, Countess of Ranfurly, the wife of his friend from prisoner-of-war days, Dan Ranfurly. Carton de Wiart was one of the few to be able to work with the notoriously difficult commander of US forces in the China-Burma-India Theatre, US Army General Joseph Stilwell. He arrived in the headquarters of the Nationalist Chinese Government, Chongqing, in early December 1943. For the next three years, he was to be involved in a host of reporting, diplomatic and administrative duties in the remote wartime capital. Carton de Wiart became a great admirer of the Chinese people. He wrote that, when he was appointed as Churchill's personal representative to Chiang Kai-shek in China, he imagined a country "full of whimsical little people with quaint customs who carved lovely jade ornaments and worshiped their grandmothers." Once stationed in China, however, he wrote: "Two things struck me forcibly: the first was the amount of sheer hard work the people were doing, and the second their cheerfulness in doing it."

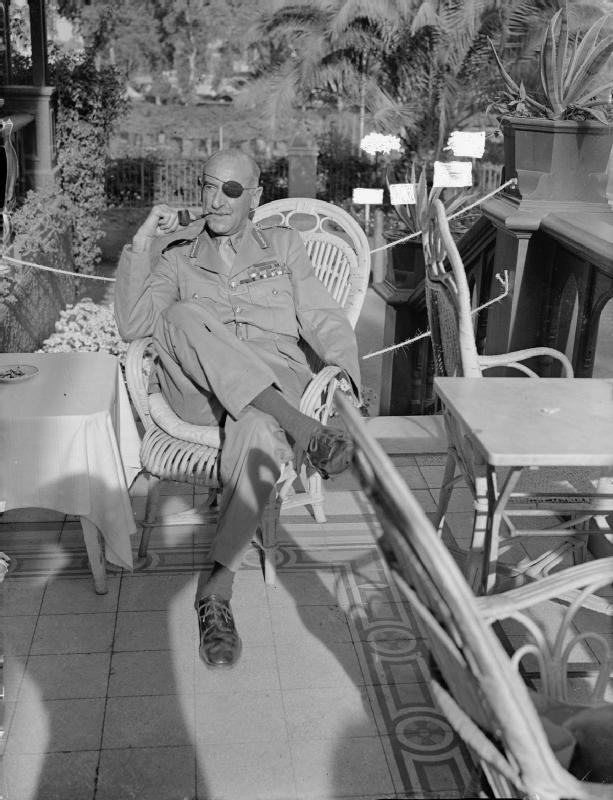
Carton de Wiart in Cairo, 1943.

He regularly flew out to India to liaise with British officials. His old friend, Richard O'Connor, had escaped from the Italian prisoner-of-war camp and was now in command of British troops in eastern India. The Governor of Bengal, the Australian Richard Casey, became a good friend.

On 9 October 1944, Carton de Wiart was promoted to temporary lieutenant-general and to the war substantive rank of major-general. Carton de Wiart returned home in December 1944 to report to the War Cabinet on the Chinese situation. He was appointed Knight Commander of the Order of the British Empire (KBE) in the 1945 New Year Honours. Clement Attlee, when he became head of the Labour government in June 1945, asked Carton de Wiart to stay on in China.

==== South East Asia ====
Carton de Wiart was assigned to a tour of the Burma front, and after meeting Admiral Sir James Somerville, commander-in-chief of the British Eastern Fleet, he was given a front seat on the bridge of the battleship HMS Queen Elizabeth for the bombardment of Sabang in the Netherlands East Indies in 1945, including air battles between Japanese fighters and British carrier aircraft.

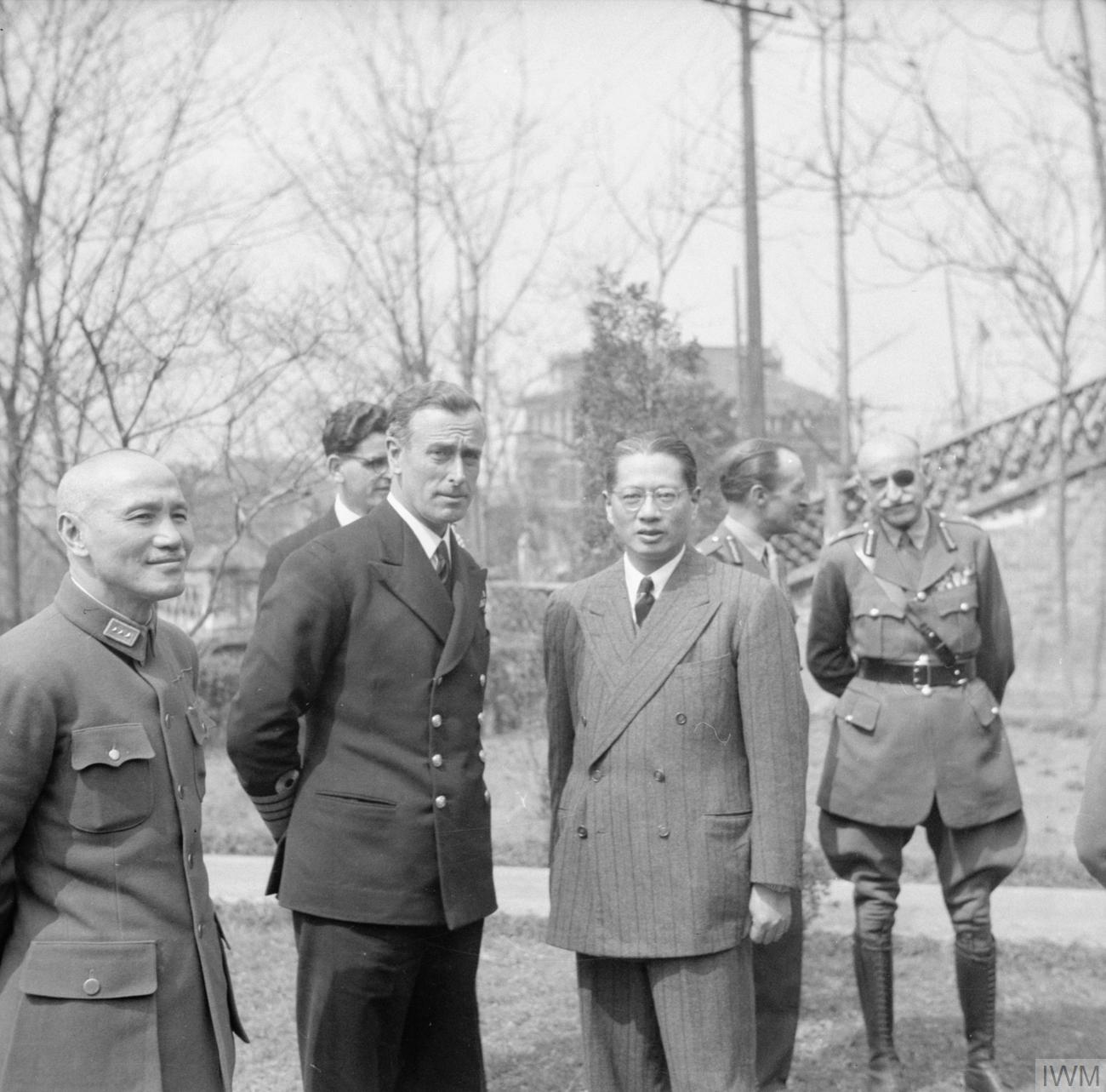
Supreme Allied Commander South East Asia Mountbatten with General Chiang Kai-Shek (left) and Dr T V Soong (right). In the background are Captain R V Brockman, Lt Gen F A M Browning and General Carton de Wiart VC at Chongqing.

A good part of Carton de Wiart's reporting had to do with the increasing power of the Chinese Communists. The journalist and historian Max Hastings writes "De Wiart despised all Communists on principle, denounced Mao Zedong as 'a fanatic', and added: 'I cannot believe he means business'. He told the British cabinet that there was no conceivable alternative to Chiang as ruler of China." He met Mao Zedong at dinner and had a memorable exchange with him, interrupting his propaganda speech to criticise him for holding back from fighting the Japanese for domestic political reasons. Mao was briefly stunned, and then laughed.

After the Japanese surrender in August 1945, Carton de Wiart flew to Singapore to participate in the formal surrender. After a visit to Peking, he moved to Nanking, the now-liberated Nationalist capital, accompanied by Julian Amery, the British Prime Minister's Personal Representative to Chiang. A visit to Tokyo to meet General Douglas MacArthur came at the end of his tenure. He was now 66 and ready to retire, despite the offer of a job by Chiang. Carton de Wiart retired in October 1947, with the honorary rank of lieutenant-general.

== Retirement and death ==
En route home via French Indochina, Carton de Wiart stopped in Rangoon as a guest of the army commander. Coming downstairs, he slipped on coconut matting, fell, broke several vertebrae, and knocked himself unconscious. He was admitted to Rangoon Hospital where he was treated.

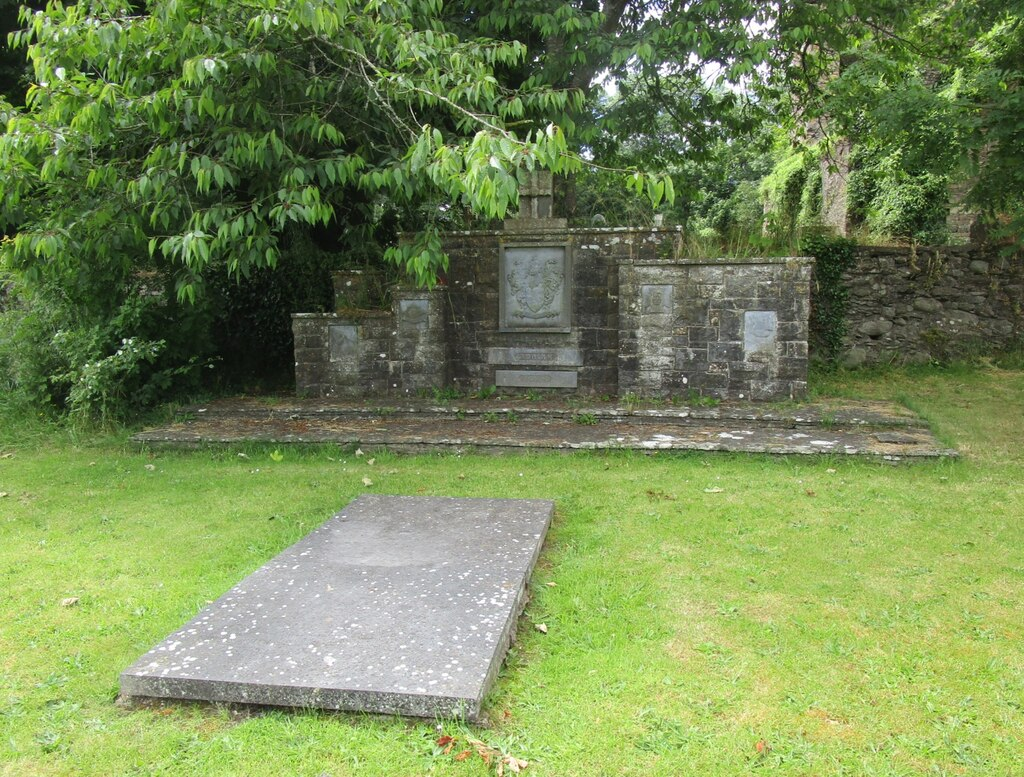
Memorial to Adrian and Joan Carton de Wiart in Caum churchyard, near Macroom, County Cork, Ireland

His first wife died in 1949. In 1951, at the age of 71, he married Ruth Myrtle Muriel Joan McKechnie, a divorcee known as Joan Sutherland, 23 years his junior (born in late 1903, she died 13 January 2006 at the age of 102). They settled at Aghinagh House, Killinardrish, County Cork, Ireland.

Carton de Wiart died at the age of 83 on 5 June 1963. He left no papers. He and his wife Joan are buried in Caum churchyard just off the main Macroom road. The grave site is just outside the graveyard wall in the grounds of his home, Aghinagh House. Carton de Wiart's will was valued at probate in Ireland at £4,158 and England at £3,496.

== Publications ==
- Happy Odyssey: The Memoirs of Lieutenant-General Sir Adrian Carton de Wiart, Jonathan Cape, 1950.

== Awards and decorations ==
Carton de Wiart was the recipient of several awards:

Victoria Cross (VC)	1916
Knight Commander of the Order of the British Empire (KBE) (Military Division)	New Year Honours 1945
Companion of the Order of the Bath (CB) (Military Division)	Birthday Honours 1919
Companion of the Order of St Michael and St George (CMG)	Birthday Honours 1918
Companion of the Distinguished Service Order (DSO)	1915
Queen's South Africa Medal	with clasps for "South Africa 1901," "Transvaal," "Orange Free State" and "Cape Colony"
Africa General Service Medal	with clasp for "Shimber Berris 1914–15"
1914 Star	
British War Medal	
Victory Medal (United Kingdom)	with bronze oak leaf for MID
1939–45 Star	
Africa Star	
Burma Star	
Italy Star	
War Medal 1939-1945	with bronze oak leaf for MID
King George VI Coronation Medal	1937
Queen Elizabeth II Coronation Medal	1953
Officer of the Order of the Crown (Belgium)	1917
Croix de guerre 1914–1918 (Belgium)	1918
Silver Cross (Knight) of the Order of Military Virtue of Poland	1920
Cross of Valour (Poland)	Two awards (1920, 1941)
Commander of the Legion of Honour of France	
Croix de guerre 1939–1945 (France)	With bronze palm for army-level MID

== In popular culture ==
Carton de Wiart is the subject of the 2022 song "The Unkillable Soldier" by Swedish power metal band Sabaton on their album The War to End all Wars. He is portrayed by Indy Neidell in the music video for the song.

== See also ==
- Jack Churchill, another notably eccentric British officer

== Sources ==
- Carton de Wiart, Sir Adrian (1950). Happy Odyssey: The Memoirs of Lieutenant-General Sir Adrian Carton de Wiart V.C., K.B.E., C.B., C.M.G., D.S.O.; with a Foreword by the Rt. Hon. Winston S. Churchill O.M. Jonathan Cape.
- Fox, Frank (1923). The History of the Royal Gloucestershire Hussars Yeomanry, 1898–1922. London: Philip Allan & Co.
- Ranfurly, Hermione (1995). To War With Whitaker, The Wartime Diaries of the Countess of Ranfurly 1939–1945. London: Mandarin Paperbacks.

Military offices
Preceded by Robert Collins	GOC 61st Infantry Division; 1939–1941	Succeeded by Charles Fullbrook-Leggatt
Honorary titles
Preceded by Arthur Solly-Flood	Colonel of the 4th/7th Royal Dragoon Guards; 1940–1948	Succeeded by John Aizlewood
