= Fuggerschloss Babenhausen =

Castle in Bavaria, Germany

Coordinates: 48.1432°N 10.2552°E

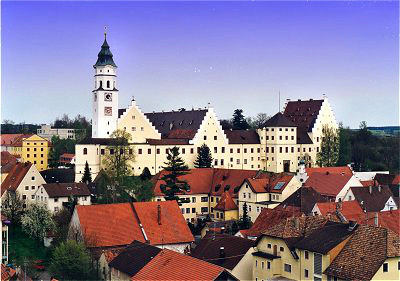
Fuggerschloss Babenhausen

The Fuggerschloss Babenhausen is a castle in Babenhausen, Bavaria. It is the home of the Fugger-Babenhausen family, which was promoted to the status of Imperial Princes in 1803.
