= Waldburg =

- Municipality
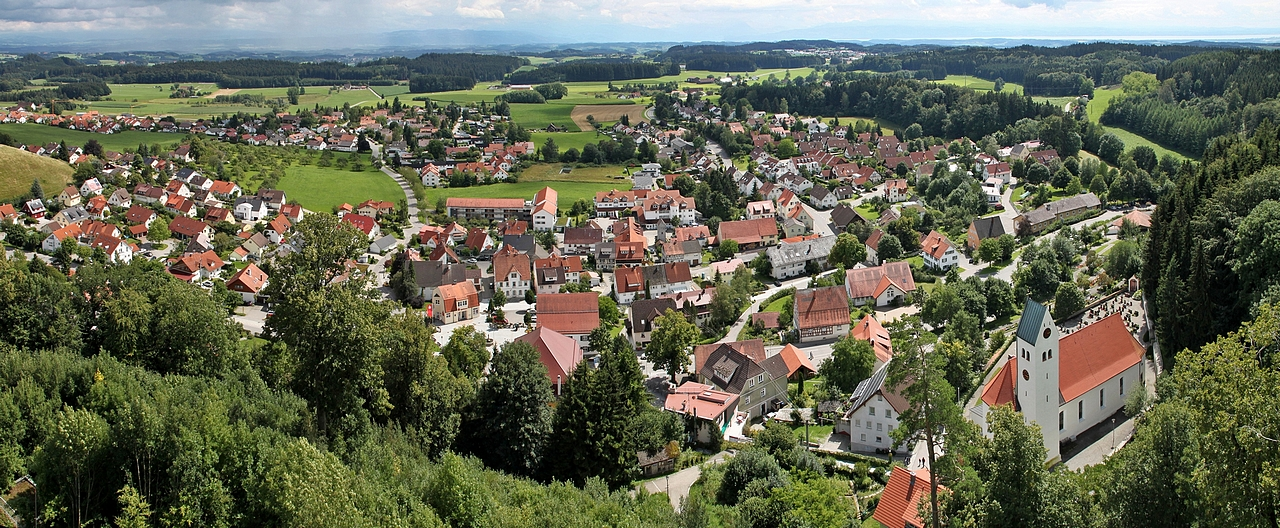
- Panorama of Waldburg

- Coat of arms

- Location of Waldburg within Ravensburg district
- Interactive map of Waldburg
- Location within Germany Location within Baden-Württemberg
- Coordinates: 47°45′25″N 09°42′46″E
- Country: Germany
- State: Baden-Württemberg
- Admin. region: Tübingen
- District: Ravensburg
- Municipal assoc.: Gullen

Government
  - Mayor (2018–26): Michael Röger

Area
  - Total: 22.70 km^{2} (8.76 sq mi)
- Elevation: 723 m (2,372 ft)

Population (2025-12-31)
  - Total: 3,296
  - Density: 145.2/km^{2} (376.1/sq mi)
- Time zone: UTC+01:00 (CET)
  - Summer (DST): UTC+02:00 (CEST)
- Postal codes: 88289
- Dialling codes: 07529
- Vehicle registration: RV
- Website: www.gemeinde-waldburg.de

Waldburg is a town in the district of Ravensburg in Baden-Württemberg in Germany. It is the home of Waldburg Castle, a medieval castle that sits atop the large hill in the town. The castle dates from the twelfth century, when Waldburg was a County of the Holy Roman Empire.

== House of Waldburg ==
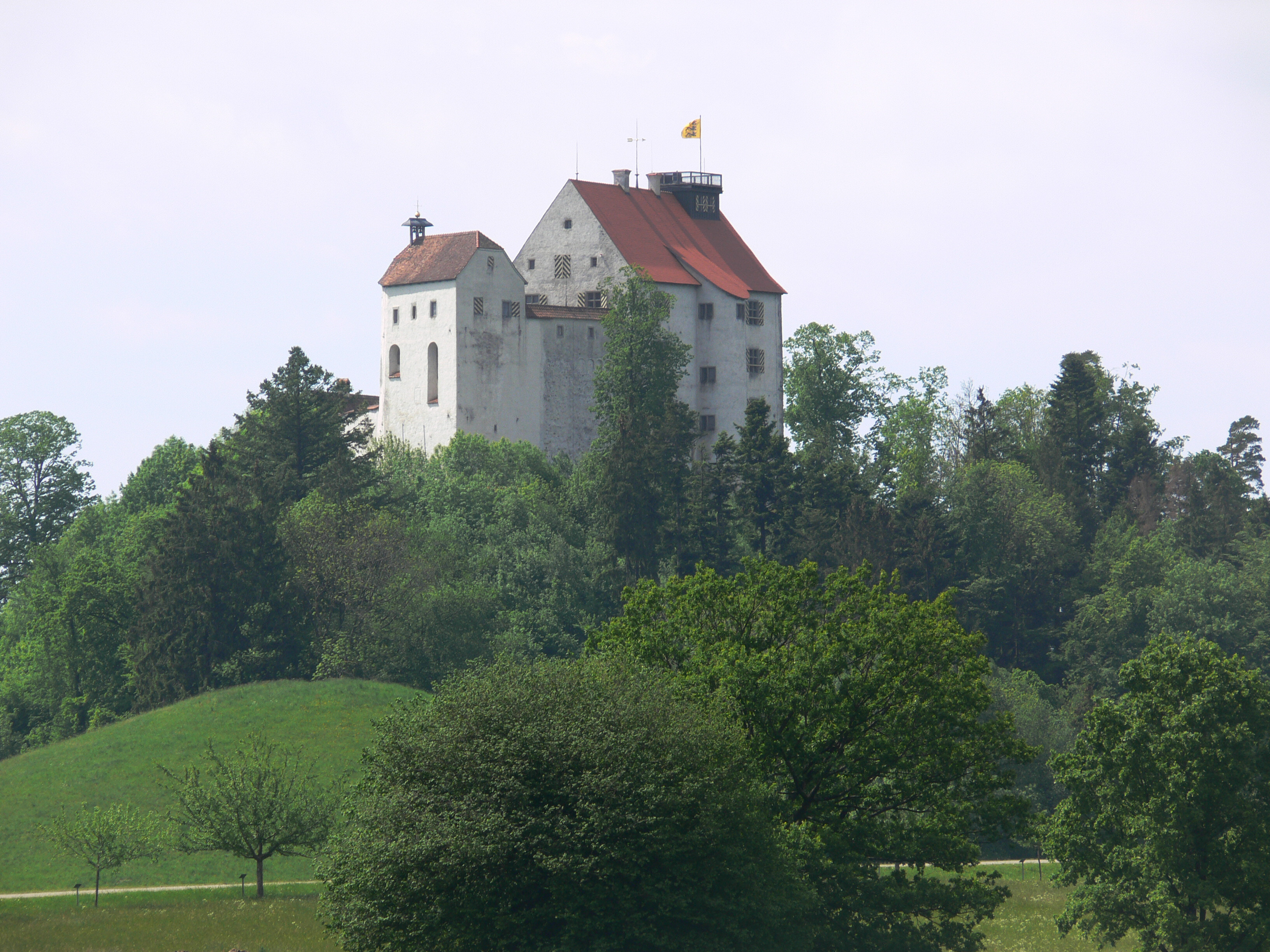
Waldburg castle, in May 2007

In 1424, the county was partitioned:

- Waldburg-Sonnenburg, annexed by Austria, 1511
- Waldburg-Trauchburg, partitioned in 1504:
  - Waldburg-Capustigall, annexed by Prussia, 1745
  - Waldburg-Trauchburg, partitioned in 1612:
    - Waldburg-Friedburg-Scheer, restored in 1717
    - Waldburg-Trauchburg, partitioned in 1717:
      - Waldburg-Scheer, restored in 1764
      - Waldburg-Trauchburg, annexed by Waldburg-Zeil, 1772
- Waldburg-Wolfegg-Zeil, partitioned in 1589:
  - Waldburg-Waldburg, divided between Waldburg-Wolfegg and Waldburg-Zeil in 1660
  - Waldburg-Wolfegg, partitioned in 1667:
    - Waldburg-Waldsee, raised to principality in 1803, mediatised to Württemberg in 1806
    - Waldburg-Wolfegg, annexed by Waldburg-Waldsee in 1798
  - Waldburg-Zeil, partitioned in 1674:
    - Waldburg-Wurzach, raised to principality in 1803, mediatised to Württemberg in 1806
    - Waldburg-Zeil, raised to principality in 1803, mediatised to Württemberg in 1806
