= List of states in the Holy Roman Empire (F) =

This is a list of states in the Holy Roman Empire beginning with the letter F. Some historians mark the beginning of the Empire as 800, with the coronation of Frankish king Charlemagne ("Charles the Great").

Name	Type	Imperial circle	Imperial diet	History
Fagnolle	Lordship; 1571: Barony; 1770: County	Low Rhen	WE	Originally to Lords of Fagnolle; 1218: To Rumigny; 1333: To Enghien; 1470: To Barbançon; 1571: To Hénin-Liétard; HRE Baron; 1598: To Melun; 1634: To Ligne; 1770: HRE Count; 1787: Joined Lower Rhenish-Westphalian Circle; 1789: Joined Bench of Counts of Westphalia; 1792: To France; 1803: Ligne compensated with Edelstetten; 1815: To the Netherlands; 1830: To Belgium
Falkenstein	Lordship	n/a	n/a	1220: Partitioned from Bolanden; 1255: Inherited territories of Hagen-Münzenberg; 1271: Partitioned into Falkenstein-Münzenberg-Lich and Falkenstein-Münzenberg-Butzbach
Falkenstein	County	Upp Rhen	n/a	1518: Title invested on Daun-Oberstein, renamed Daun-Falkenstein; 1546: To Daun-Falkenstein-Oberstein; 1628: Half to Löwenhaupt-Rasburg; 1652: Daun half to Manderscheid-Kail; 1686: Manderscheid half to Manderscheid-Kail-Blankenheim; 1724: To Lorraine; 1731: To Austria; 1794: To France
Falkenstein-Münzenberg-Butzbach	Lordship; 1393: County	n/a	n/a	1271: Partitioned from Falkenstein; 1393: HRE Count; 1409: Extinct; to Falkenstein-Münzenberg-Lich
Falkenstein-Münzenberg-Lich	Lordship; 1398: County	n/a	n/a	1271: Partitioned from Falkenstein; 1398: HRE Count; 1418: Extinct; divided between Eppstein and Solms
Feldkirch	Lordship; County	n/a	n/a	c. 1218: First mentioned; to Montfort; 1258: To Montfort-Feldkirch; 1375: To Austria
Finstingen	Lordship; County	n/a	n/a	12th Century: First mentioned; to Malberg; 1259: Partitioned into Finstingen-Schwanhals and Finstingen-Brackenkopf lines 1458: To Lorraine
Flanders	County	Burg	n/a	862; 1405: To the Duchy of Burgundy; fief of France (except 'Imperial Flanders', mainly Aalst); 1529: To the Spanish Netherlands; 1714: To the Austrian Netherlands; 1792: To France; 1815: To the Netherlands; 1830: To Belgium
Fleckenstein	Lordship	n/a	n/a	12th Century; Gau Counts in the Haguenau; 1259: Partitioned into Fleckenstein-Hunsingen, Fleckenstein-Sulz and Fleckenstein-Bickenbach
Fleckenstein-Bickenbach	Lordship	n/a	n/a	1259: Partitioned from Fleckenstein; 1408: Partitioned into Fleckenstein-Bickenbach-Rödern and Fleckenstein-Bickenbach-Sulz
Fleckenstein-Bickenbach-Rödern	Lordship; 1467: Barony	n/a	n/a	1408: Partitioned from Fleckenstein-Bickenbach; 1467: HRE Barony; 1637: Extinct; to Fleckenstein-Bickenbach-Sulz
Fleckenstein-Bickenbach-Sulz	Lordship; 1467: Barony	n/a	n/a	1408: Partitioned from Fleckenstein-Bickenbach; 1467: HRE Barony; 1658: Renamed to Fleckenstein-Windeck
Fleckenstein-Dagstuhl	Lordship; 1463: Barony	Upp Rhen	WE	1375: Renamed from Fleckenstein-Hunsingen; 1463: HRE Barony; 1625: Sold Dagstuhl to Sötern; 1644: Extinct
Fleckenstein-Hunsingen	Lordship	n/a	n/a	1259: Partitioned from Fleckenstein; 1375: Inherited 1/4 of Dagstuhl; renamed to Fleckenstein-Dagstuhl
Fleckenstein-Sulz	Lordship	n/a	n/a	1259: Partitioned from Fleckenstein; 1351: Extinct; to Fleckenstein-Bickenbach
Fleckenstein-Windeck	Barony	n/a	n/a	1658: Renamed from Fleckenstein-Bickenbach-Sulz; 1720: Extinct; divided between Göllnitz, Gayling von Altheim and Ebersbach
Franconia (Franken)	Stem Duchy	n/a	n/a	8th Century; 1196: Discontinued
Franconia (Franken)	Duchy	n/a	n/a	1633: Created for Bernard of Saxe-Weimar in lands conquered in the Franconian Circle during the Thirty Years' War; 1639: Abolished
Frankenstein	Lordship; 1670: Barony	Upp Rhen	RH	13th Century: Lords and HRE Barons of Frankenstein; 1402: Imperial Immediacy; 1662: sold to Hesse-Darmstadt
Frankfurt	Imperial City	Upp Rhen	RH	1372: Free Imperial City; 1806: To the Archbishopric of Regensburg; 1810: To the Grand Duchy of Frankfurt; 1815: Free City; 1866: To Prussia
Franzenheim	Lordship	n/a	n/a	12th Century?: Lords of Franzenheim; Fief of the cathedral of Trier; 1794: To France; 1815: To Prussia
Frauenalb	Abbacy	n/a	n/a	12th Century; 1193: Obtained secular territory 1802: Secularised to Baden
Frauenchiemsee; Frauenwörth	Abbacy	n/a	n/a	782: Abbey established with imperial immediacy 1803: To Bavaria
Fraumünster	853: Imperial Abbacy; Imperial Duchess-Abbey	n/a	n/a	853; 1218: Imperial immediacy 1234: HRE Princess; 1406: Secular nunnery 1524: Secularised by Zürich
Fraunberg	HRE Lordship	n/a	n/a	12th Century; 1145: First mentioned 1245: Inherited immediate Barony of Haag; 1276: Partitioned into Fraunberg-Haag and Fraunberg-Fraunberg
Fraunberg-Haag	HRE County	Bav	SC	1276: Partitioned from Fraunberg; 1465: HRE Baron; 1509: HRE Count; 1566: Extinct; to Bavaria
Freiburg im Breisgau	City	n/a	n/a	1120; Originally a territory of Zähringen; 1218: To Urach; 1230: To Freiburg local counts 1368: To Austria
Freiburg	County	n/a	n/a	1250: Partitioned from Urach; 1272: Partitioned into itself and Badenweiler; 1368: City of Freiburg to Austria; 1444: To Baden-Hachberg-Sausenberg; 1458: Extinct
Freising	738: Bishopric; 1220: Prince-Bishopric	Bav	EC	724: Founded as a monastery 738: Bishopric; 1220: HRE Prince; 1803: Secularised to Bavaria
Freudenberg	962: Imperial Abbacy			1801: Annexed to France; 1815: Annexed to Prussia
Freudenberg	1250: HRE Lordship	n/a	n/a	12th Century; Originally a territory of the Bishopric of Würzburg; 1295: To Wertheim as fief of Würzburg; 1407: To Wertheim-Breuberg as fief of Würzburg; 1482: To Wertheim-Freudenberg as fief of Würzburg; 1509: To Wertheim-Breuberg as fief of Würzburg; 1556: Wertheim extinct; to Würzburg; 1581: To Löwenstein-Wertheim as fief of Würzburg; 1611: To Löwenstein-Wertheim-Virneburg as fief of Würzburg; 1803: To Lowenstein-Wertheim-Freudenberg; 1806: To Baden
Fribourg; Freiburg im Üechtland	Imperial Free City			1157: Freiburg town founded 1157: To Zähringen; 1218: To Kyburg; 1277: To Austria; 1452: To Savoy; 1478: Free Imperial City; 1481: Joined the Swiss Confederation; 1648: Left the Empire
Friedberg	County; 1785: Princely County of Friedberg and Scheer	Swab	SC	13th Century; To local Co. of Friedberg; 1282: To Austria; 1452: To Waldburg-Sonnenberg; 1477: To Waldburg-Scheer; 1483: To Waldburg-Sonnenberg; 1511: To Waldburg-Trauchburg; 1566: To Waldburg-Friedburg-Scheer; 1717: To Waldburg-Trauchburg, then Waldburg-Scheer; 1764: To Waldburg-Trauchburg; 1777: To Waldburg-Zeil-Wurzach; 1785: To Thurn and Taxis; 1806: To Württemberg
Friedberg	Imperial City	Upp Rhen	RH	1216; 1252: Free Imperial City; 1802: To Hesse-Darmstadt
Frisia; Friesland	Freedom; Chiefdom; County; Seignory	Burg	n/a	1498: Lordship established in Burgundian Netherlands; 1516: Spanish Netherlands; 1566: Joined the Netherlands
Friuli	Duchy	Aust	n/a	1077: To Patriarchate of Aquileia; 1420: To Venice; 1516: Friuli split, Austrian Friuli under Austrian rule 1805: To Italy; 1815: To Lombardy-Venetia
Fugger von der Lilie	1530: HRE County of Kirchberg and Weissenhorn	Swab	SC	1455; 1507: Acquired Co. of Kirchberg and Lo. of Weißenhorn (non-immediate); 1511: HRE Noble; 1530: HRE Count; 1530: Raymond and Anton lines 1535: Raymond line partitioned into Fugger-Kirchberg-Weißenhorn; 1560: Anton line partitioned into Fugger-Nordendorf, Fugger-Kirchheim and Fugger-Wöllenburg
Fugger-Adelshofen	HRE County	n/a	n/a	1690: Partitioned from Fugger-Zinnenberg-Adelshofen; 1751: Extinct; to Fugger-Zinnenberg; 1751: Partitioned from Fugger-Zinnenberg; 1757: Extinct; to Fugger-Zinnenberg
Fugger-Babenhausen	HRE County; 1803: HRE Prince	Swab	SC	1598: Partitioned from Fugger-Wöllenburg; 1693: Partitioned into itself and Fugger-Boos; 1757: Extinct; to Fugger-Boos; 1759: Partitioned from Fugger-Boos; 1803: HRE Prince; 1806: To Bavaria
Fugger-Boos	HRE County	Swab	SC	1693: Partitioned from Fugger-Babenhausen; 1759: Partitioned into itself and Fugger-Babenhausen; 1777: Extinct; to Fugger-Babenhausen
Fugger-Dudenstein	HRE County	Swab	SC	1677: Partitioned from Fugger-Wörth-Nordendorf; 1739: Extinct; to Fugger-Nordendorf
Fugger-Glött	HRE County	Swab	SC	1598: Partitioned from Fugger-Kirchheim; 1644: Partitioned into itself, Fugger-Wörth-Nordendorf, Fugger-Grunenbach and Fugger-Mickhausen; 1672: Bonaventura to Fugger-Kirchheim; 1711: Partitioned into itself and Fugger-Stettenfels; 1806: To Bavaria
Fugger-Gmünd	HRE County	Swab	SC	1579: Partitioned from Fugger-Kirchberg-Weißenhorn; 1654: Extinct; to Fugger-Kirchberg
Fugger-Göttersdorf	HRE County	n/a	n/a	1575: Partitioned from Fugger-Pfirt; 1627: Partitioned into itself, Fugger-Sulmentingen and Fugger-Zinnenberg-Adelshofen
Fugger-Grunenbach	HRE County	Swab	SC	1644: Partitioned from Fugger-Glött; 1687: Extinct; to Fugger-Mickhausen; 1701: Partitioned from Fugger-Mickhausen; 17??: Extinct; to Fugger-Mickhausen
Fugger-Kirchberg	HRE County	Swab	SC	1626: Partitioned from Fugger-Weißenhorn; 1690: Renamed to Fugger-Kirchberg-Weißenhorn
Fugger-Kirchberg-Weißenhorn	HRE County	Swab	SC	1535: Raymond line Counts in Kirchberg and Weißenhorn; 1579: Partitioned into Fugger-Weißenhorn and Fugger-Gmünd; 1690: Reunited by Fugger-Kirchberg; 1692: Paritioned into itself and Fugger-Moorstetten; 1806: To Bavaria
Fugger-Kirchheim	HRE County	Swab	SC	1560: Partitioned from Anton line 1598: Partitioned into itself and Fugger-Glött; 1672: Extinct; given to Bonaventura of Fugger-Glött; 1780: Appanage line Fugger-Kirchheim-Hoheneck created 1806: To Bavaria
Fugger-Kirchheim-Hoheneck	HRE County	n/a	n/a	1780: Appanage created from Fugger-Kirchheim
Fugger-Mickhausen	HRE County	Swab	SC	1644: Partitioned from Fugger-Glött; 1701: Partitioned into itself and Fugger-Grunenbach; 1804: Extinct; to Fugger-Glött
Fugger-Moorstetten	HRE County	Swab	SC	1692: Partitioned from Fugger-Kirchberg-Weißenhorn; 1727: Extinct; to Fugger-Kirchberg-Weißenhorn
Fugger-Nordendorf	HRE County	Swab	SC	1560: Partitioned from Anton line 1669: Extinct; to Fugger-Kirchheim; 1677: Partitioned from Fugger-Wörth-Nordendorf; 1806: To Bavaria
Fugger-Pfirt	HRE County	n/a	n/a	1535: Raymond line Counts in Alsace and Bavaria; 1575: Partitioned into itself and Fugger-Göttersdorf; 1633: Extinct; to Fugger-Göttersdorf
Fugger-Stettenfels	HRE County	n/a	n/a	1711: Partitioned from Fugger-Glött; 1735: Sold to Thurn and Taxis; 1820: Extinct
Fugger-Sulmentingen	HRE County	n/a	n/a	1627: Partitioned from Fugger-Göttersdorf; 1739: Extinct; to Fugger-Göttersdorf
Fugger-Weißenhorn	HRE County	Swab	SC	1579: Partitioned from Fugger-Kirchberg-Weißenhorn; 1626: Partitioned into Fugger-Kirchberg and itself 1690: Extinct; to Fugger-Kirchberg
Fugger-Wöllenburg	HRE County	Swab	SC	1560: Partitioned from Anton line 1598: Partitioned into itself and Fugger-Babenhausen; 1643: Extinct; to Fugger-Babenhausen
Fugger-Wörth-Nordendorf	HRE County	Swab	SC	1644: Partitioned from Fugger-Glött; 1677: Partitioned into Fugger-Nordendorf and Fugger-Dudenstein
Fugger-Zinnenberg	HRE County	n/a	n/a	1690: Partitioned from Fugger-Zinnenberg-Adelshofen; 1751: Partitioned into itself and Fugger-Adelshofen; 1757: Renamed to Fugger-Zinnenberg-Adelshofen
Fugger-Zinnenberg-Adelshofen	HRE County	n/a	n/a	1627: Partitioned from Fugger-Göttersdorf; 1690: Partitioned into Fugger-Adelshofen and Fugger-Zinnenberg; 1757: Reunited by Fugger-Zinnenberg; 1795: Extinct; to Bavaria
Fulda	1156: HRE Prince-Abbacy; 1752: Prince-Bishopric	Upp Rhen	EC	744; 774: Imperial immediacy 1220: HRE Prince; 1576-1602: Annexed to the Teutonic Order; 1803: Secularised to Nassau-Orange-Fulda; 1806: to France; 1807: to Westphalia; 1815: To Hesse-Cassel; 1867: to Prussia
Fürstenberg; Westphalian	1660: HRE Barons	n/a	n/a	14th Century; NOTE: Different from family of Princes of Furstenberg
Fürstenberg; Swabian	County	Swab	SC	1250: Partitioned from Urach; 1283: Landgrave of Baar; 1284: Partitioned into Fürstenberg-Fürstenberg and Fürstenberg-Haslach; 1386: Reunited by Fürstenberg-Fürstenberg; 1408: Partitioned into Fürstenberg-Fürstenberg and Fürstenberg-Wolfach; 1490: Reunited by Fürstenberg-Baar; 1559: Partitioned into Fürstenberg-Blumberg and Fürstenberg-Heiligenberg; 1744: Reunited by Fürstenberg-Fürstenberg; 1806: To Baden, Hohenzollern-Sigmaringen and Württemberg
Fürstenberg-Baar	County	Swab	SC	1441: Partitioned from Fürstenberg-Fürstenberg; 1490: Renamed to Fürstenberg
Fürstenberg-Blumberg	County	Swab	SC	1559: Partitioned from Fürstenberg; 1599: Partitioned into itself and Fürstenberg-Möhringen; 1614: Partitioned into Fürstenberg-Messkirch and Fürstenberg-Stühlingen
Fürstenberg-Donaueschingen	County	Swab	SC	1617: Partitioned from Fürstenberg-Heiligenberg; 1698: Extinct; to Fürstenberg-Heiligenberg
Fürstenberg-Fürstenberg	County; 1716: HRE Prince	Swab	SC	1284: Partitioned from Fürstenberg; 1386: Renamed to Fürstenberg; 1408: Partitioned from Fürstenberg; 1441: Partitioned into Fürstenberg-Baar and Fürstenberg-Geislingen; 1704: Partitioned from Fürstenberg-Stühlingen; 1744: Renamed to Fürstenberg
Fürstenberg-Geislingen	County	n/a	n/a	1441: Partitioned from Fürstenberg-Fürstenberg; 1483: Extinct; to Fürstenberg-Baar
Fürstenberg-Haslach	County	n/a	n/a	1284: Partitioned from Fürstenberg; 1386: Extinct; to Fürstenberg-Fürstenberg
Fürstenberg-Heiligenberg	County; 1664: HRE Prince	Swab	SC	1559: Partitioned from Fürstenberg-Fürstenberg; 1617: Partitioned into itself and Fürstenberg-Donaueschingen; 1664: HRE Prince; 1716: Extinct; to Fürstenberg-Fürstenberg
Fürstenberg-Messkirch	County; 1716: HRE Prince	Swab	SC	1614: Partitioned from Fürstenberg-Blumberg; 1716: HRE Prince; 1744: Extinct; to Fürstenberg-Fürstenberg
Fürstenberg-Möhringen	County	Swab	SC	1599: Partitioned from Fürstenberg-Blumberg; 1641: Extinct; to Fürstenberg-Blumberg
Fürstenberg-Stühlingen	County	Swab	SC	1614: Partitioned from Fürstenberg-Blumberg; 1704: Partitioned into Fürstenberg-Fürstenberg and Fürstenberg-Weitra
Fürstenberg-Taikowitz	County	n/a	n/a	1759: Partitioned from Fürstenberg-Weitra
Fürstenberg-Weitra	County	n/a	n/a	1704: Partitioned from Fürstenberg-Stühlingen, containing lands within Austria centred around Tavíkovice and Weitra; 1759: Partitioned between itself and Fürstenberg-Taikowitz
Fürstenberg-Wolfach	County	n/a	n/a	1408: Partitioned from Fürstenberg; 1490: Extinct; to Fürstenberg-Baar
Further Austria	Not a single polity	Aust	PR	1278; Included numerous counties, lordships, cities, etc., in south-western Germany obtained by the House of Habsburg and administered as a single entity, usually from the Tyrol; 1805: Dispersed between Baden, Bavaria, Hohenzollern-Hechingen, Hohenzollern-Sigmaringen and Württemberg
Füssen	Abbacy	n/a	n/a	1662; Part of the Bishopric of Augsburg; 1803: To the Teutonic Order; 1805: To Bavaria
