= Friedrich Sebastian Wunibald Truchsess zu Waldburg =

Frederick Sebastian Wunibald Truchsess von Waldburg
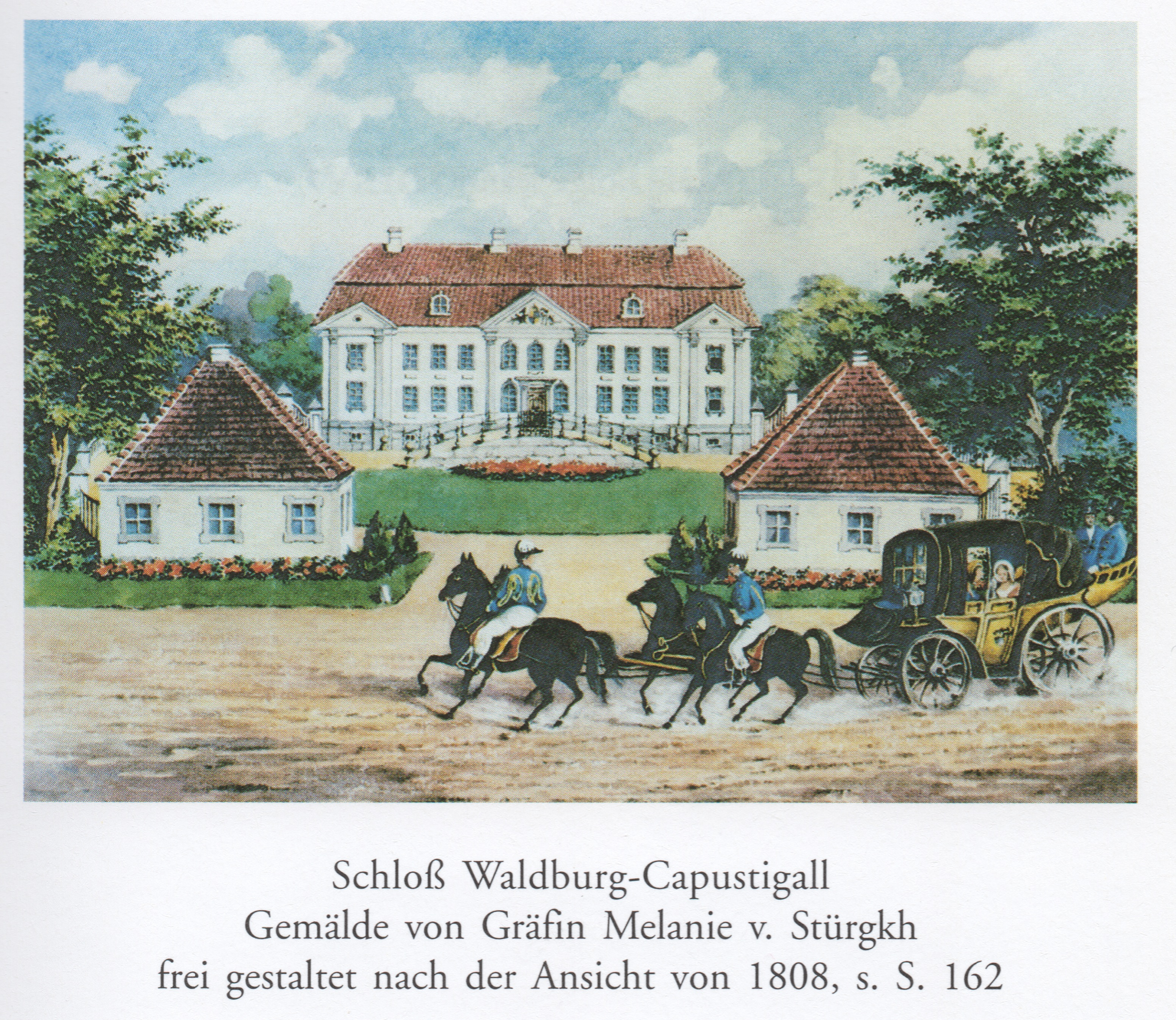
- Family seat of the Waldburg Capustigal
- Born: 1677 or 31 May 1691; Prussia
- Died: 4 July 1745; Hohenfriedberg
- Military career
- Allegiance: (Kingdom of Prussia) Prussia
- Branch: Prussian Army
- Service years: 1702–1745
- Rank: Lieutenant General
- Conflicts: War of the Austrian Succession: First Silesian War; Battle of Mollwitz; Second Silesian War; Siege of Prague; Battle of Hohenfriedberg †
- Awards: Order of the Black Eagle; Equestrian statue of Frederick the Great

Frederick Sebastian Wunibald Truchsess von Waldburg (born 1677 or 31 May 1691 – 4 July 1745) was a Prussian lieutenant general and diplomat for Frederick II of Prussia. He secured English backing for Prussia's interests in the War of Austrian Succession, and served Frederick in other capacities throughout his various wars. He was known variously as Count of Waldburg and Trux. (Note: Truchsess is not a name but a title, and dates to the medieval times of the Holy Roman Empire. The Truchsess of Waldburg, or Seneschal of Waldburg, were steward to the Holy Roman Emperors.) He died at the Battle of Hohenfriedberg in 1745. He received the Black Eagle Order and his name was inscribed on the Equestrian statue of Frederick the Great in 1851.

== Family ==
His family originated in the branches of the old Swabian House of Waldburg (Waldpurg), which had settled in the 16th century in what was then the Duchy of Prussia. The family branch was called Waldburg-Capustigall. The date of his birth is disputed in sources: either 1677 or 31 May 1691, possibly in Pillau, where his father was stationed at the fort; his father was lieutenant general Joachim Heinrich Count Truchsess von Waldburg (died 1718) and his mother, Freiin Maria Eleonore von Heydeck (1649–1692). (Note: It would be correct to list him as a "Waldburg," since this is the real name of the family. In all the contemporary writings and prints, the latter, however, appears exclusively, and King Frederick II himself writes "Trux," so it seemed more appropriate to do the same. The man himself signed his letters as "Friedrich Sebastian Erbtruchess, Count zu Waldburg", or Friedrich Sebastian, Hereditary Truchsess, Count of Waldburg.) His uncle, Wolfgang Christoph Truchsess von Waldburg (1643–1688), was also a Prussian general. One of his cousins, Karl Ludwig Truchseß von Waldburg (1685–1738) was a Prussian general and statesman. In 1742, he married Dorothea von Trzebitzky).

== Military service ==
Trux entered the Prussian military service in 1702, became a major in 1715, and in 1718 became a lieutenant-in-chief. On 26 June 1725, he was in England to give "congratulations and assurances" (See Treaty of Hanover (1725). In the collapse of Peters Tower in Berlin, on 21 August 1734, Trux was buried under the rubble for three days.

In 1736 Trux was assigned to escort the recently deposed Polish king Stanisław Leszczyński to France on behalf of the Prussian state at the expense of King Frederick William I; Stanisław diverted the journey to Königsberg, in Prussia, where he proceeded to direct guerilla operations against the Russian forces in Poland. Unable to prevent Stanisław behavior, Trux withdrew in "some disgrace" of his monarch but Frederick William admired Waldburg's 6-foot-long frame, and although moderately disgraced, he avoided a prison sentence. In 1739, Frederick William sent Trux to the Danish court in Copenhagen. In 1740, the newly crowned Frederick II, with whom he was personally acquainted, appointed him as head of the Infantry Regiment Dönhoff (No. 13), and promoted him to major general in August 1740, gave him the administrative office of Plettenberg. In the summer, Frederick sent Trux with George II from England to Hanover, where the English king was at the time. When Frederick engaged in war against Austria, he assigned to Waldburg and Jakob Friedrich von Bielfeld the task of securing Prussian interests with the House of Hanover. At the Court of Saint James, Waldburg acquired approval the English Cabinet for the Prussian plans.

At the time, George II had to accompanied Trux to Hanover. Frederick then summoned him to Silesia. Here, soon afterwards, he drew the king's anger, for which there seemed to be more reason, when, in confidence, Trux sent an officer to Olomouc, to take charge of deserters. The king then wrote to him. "I believe that you are only fifteen [troops] in number, in view of the extraordinary conduct which you have taken from the officers at Olomouc to demand deserters, be wary, or after so many such cases of discontent, you and I will quarrel." A few months later, however, Trux convinced the king of his own good intentions, at the Battle of Lösch, and was with the Prussian army sent to Brno, where, on 14 March 1742, Trux received the order to take the Veveří Castle. He was attacked by an Austrian force three times the size of his; he withdrew into a castle, but the Austrians set it on fire, forcing him to withdraw.

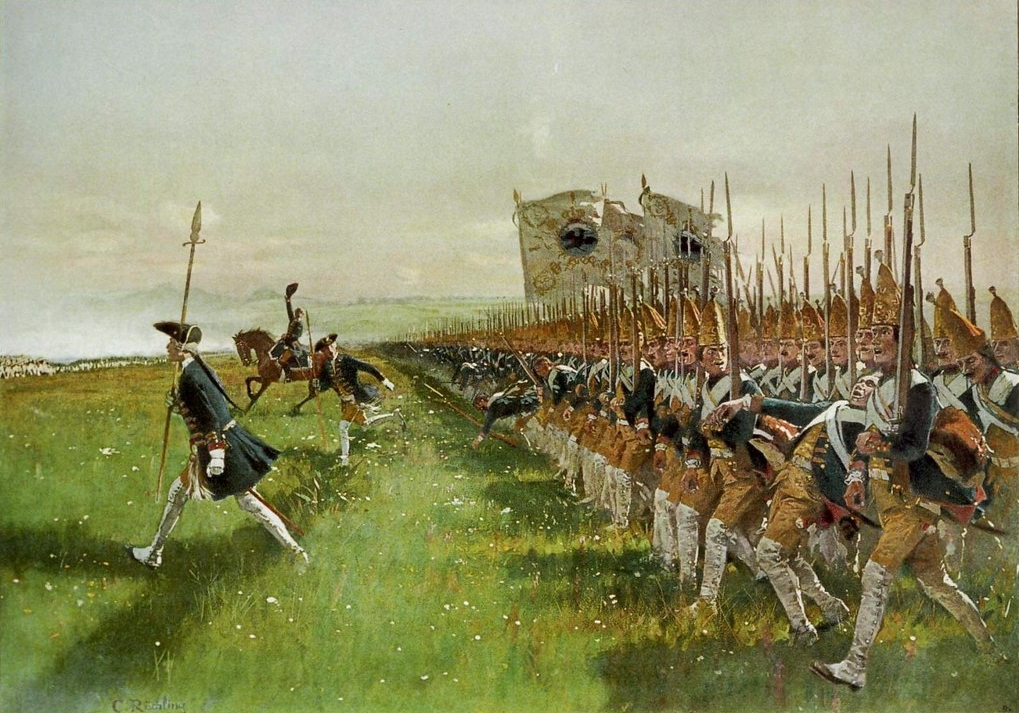
The Count was hit by a cannonball at the Battle of Hohenfriedberg, and died immediately.

After his return from London, Count von Waldburg took part in the Battle of Mollwitz, where he was wounded. In October 1741 he and his corps drove General Neipperg from the Neisse region to Troppau: modern historians suggest that this was more of a show, that Frederick, possibly through Trux, had negotiated with Neipperg to leave the Neisse region. Trux joined the campaign in Bohemia in 1744 and was present at the Siege of Prague. On May 14 he was in action at Lesch in Moravia; he was able to repel the attack, but was again wounded in the fighting. For this he received an additional pension from King and in August of that year the King gave Trux the Black Eagle Order, and in January 1745 he was promoted to the rank of lieutenant general. Later that year, he fell in the Battle of Hohenfriedberg (4 July 1745). He was struck by a cannonball, which killed him immediately. Trux died childless. His name is recorded on the Frederick's monument in Berlin.
