= Alt-Trauchburg Castle =

Alt-Trauchburg
- Alttrauchburg, Trauchburg
- Weitnau-Alttrauchburg
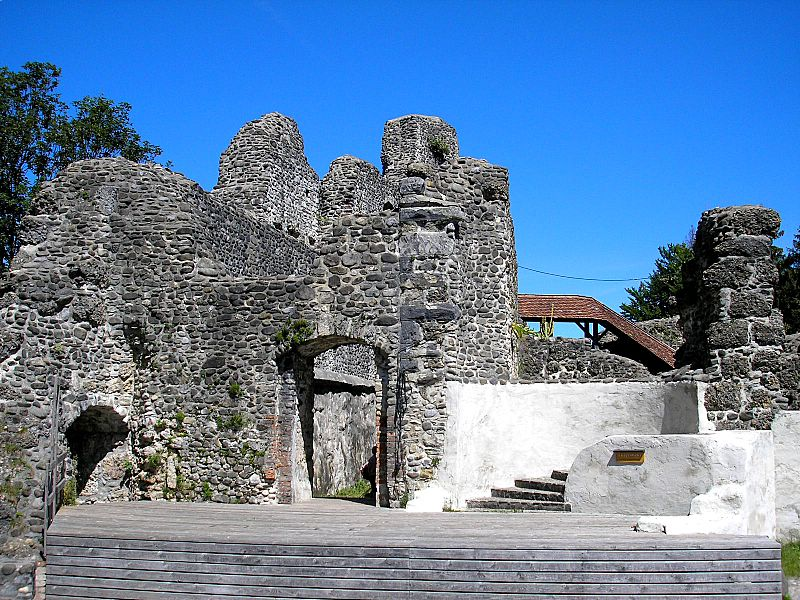
- The southwest side of the inner bailey

Site information
- Type: hill castle, spur castle
- Code: DE-BY
- Condition: considerable wall remains

Location
- Coordinates: 47°39′18″N 10°06′33″E
- Height: 903 m above sea level (NN)

Site history
- Built: 1100 to 1200
- Materials: conglomerate ashlar

Garrison information
- Occupants: nobility

The ruins of Alt-Trauchburg Castle (German: Burg Alt-Trauchburg), also called the Alttrauchburg or Trauchburg, lie above the Weitnau hamlet of Kleinweiler in the county of Oberallgäu in Swabia. Large parts of the original stone walls of the high- to post-medieval castle remain. The ruins are some of the best preserved in the Allgäu region of Germany.

== History ==
The Nellenburg coat of arms

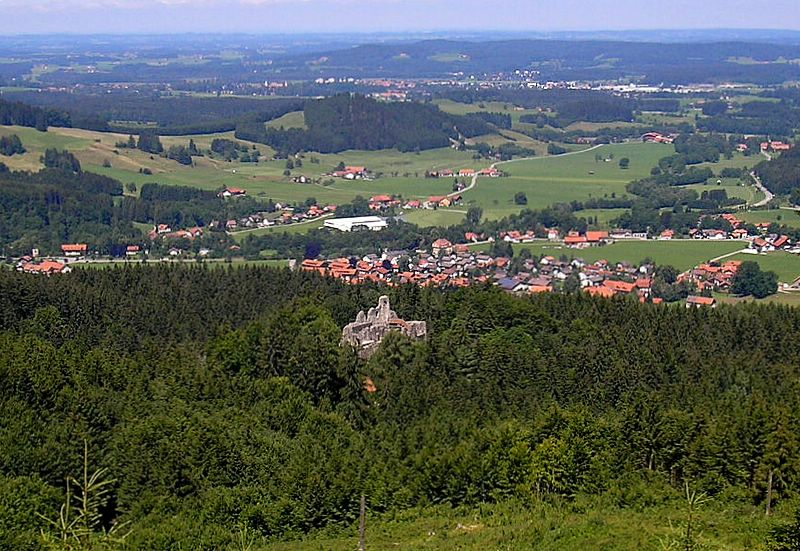
The castle seen from the Sonneck. Behind: the state border and Isny

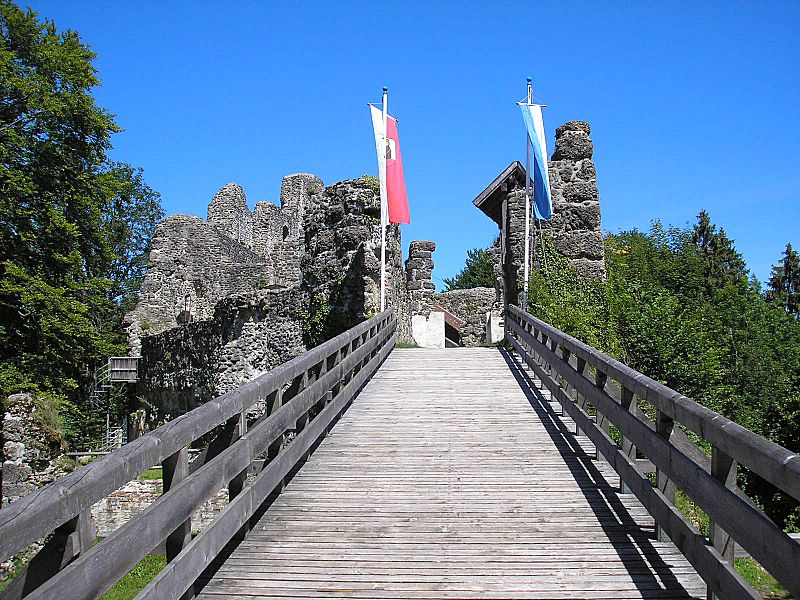
The modern wooden bridge and the inner bailey

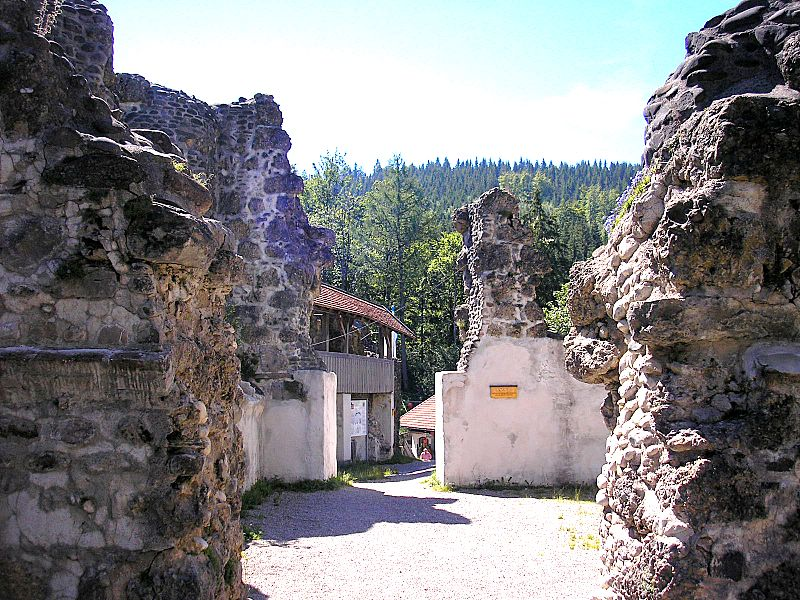
View looking back (south) at the outer bailey

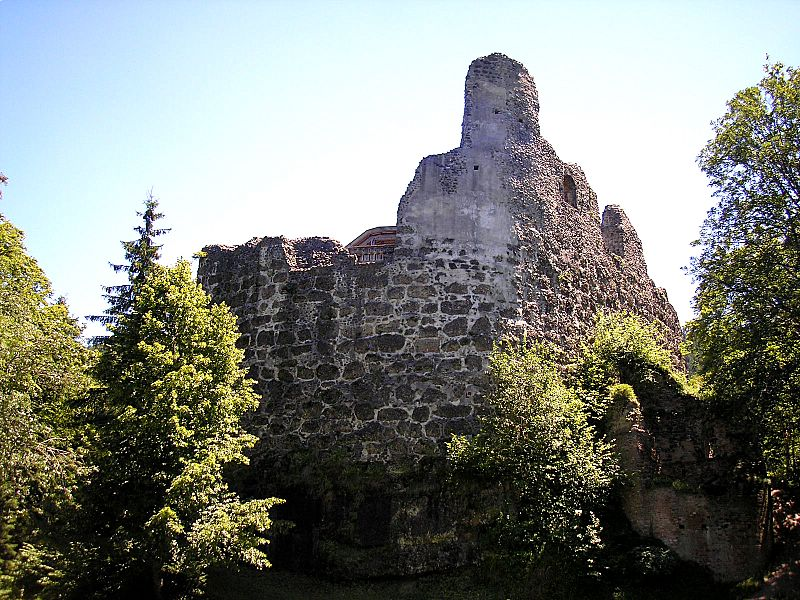
The shield wall-like reinforced northwest wall of the inner bailey

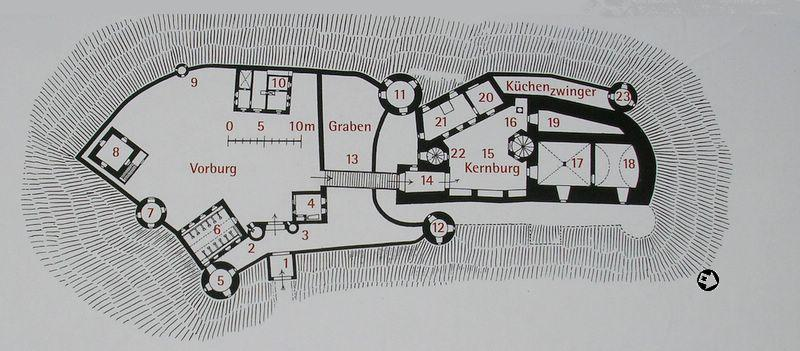
Plan on the information board in front of the neck ditch

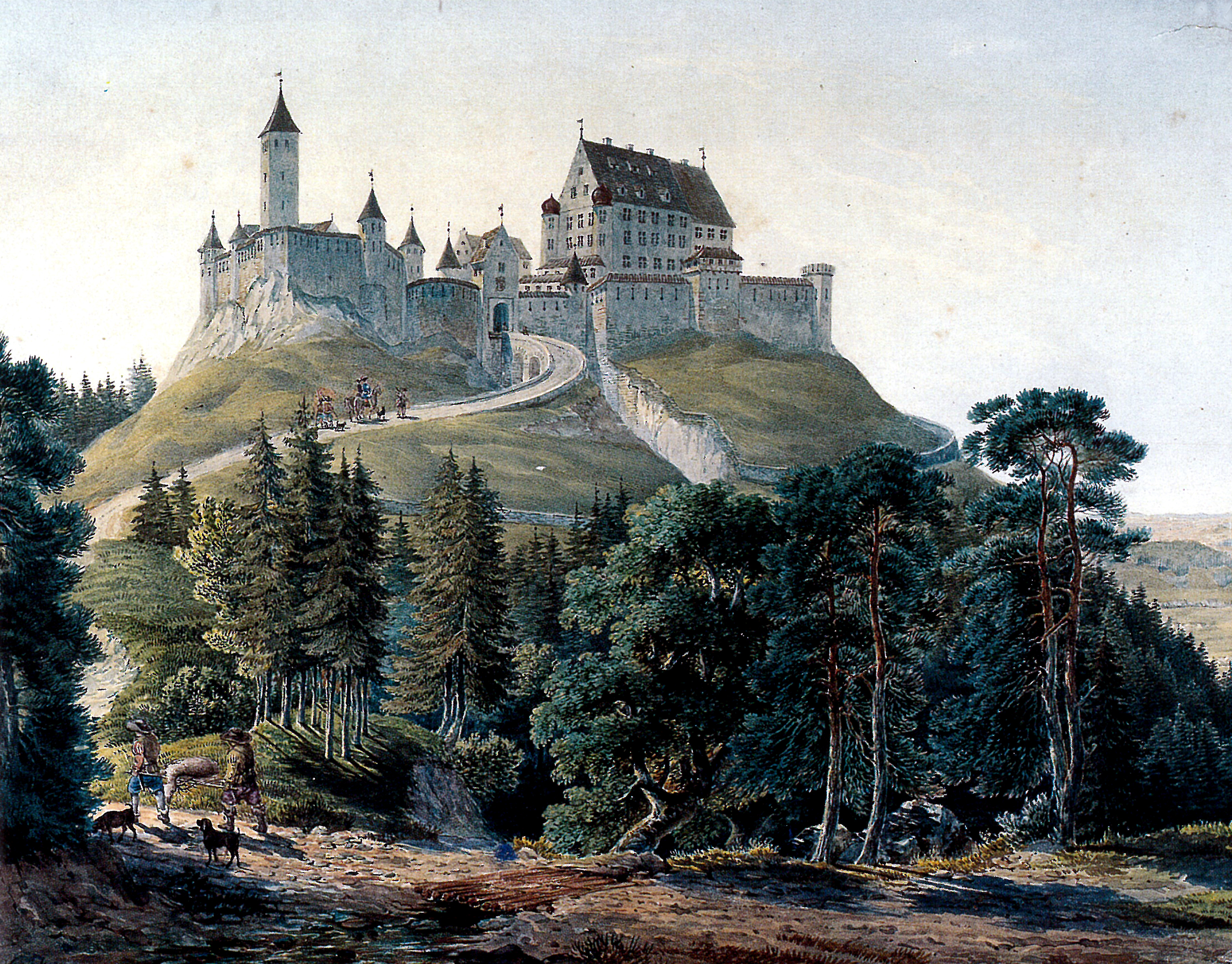
Alttrauchburg Castle in the 17th century

The hilltop castle probably goes back to the time of an earlier fortification of counts of Veringen and Nellenburg. This fortress first appears in written sources in 1041. It was probably located elsewhere nearby; the later castle only appears to have been occupied in the 13th century.

Around 1150 a branch of the lords of Rettenberg was enfeoffed with the lordship and they called themselves thereafter the "von Trauchburgs". In the early 13th century Berthold of Trauchburg moved the castle to its present location and built a fortified house or tower house here. In 1224, Berthold was the Procurator of Swabia under Emperor Frederick II.

By 1258 the fief had been given to the stewards of Waldburg, who were able to purchase it in 1306 from the count, who had run into debt. The tower-like core structure was now extended and built on. To the south, the large outer bailey was laid out together with its strong, rectangular, advanced tower.

As a result, the Waldburgs mostly lived in the castle by themselves or let had it managed by vogts (1418 Hans von Mühlegg). In 1429, the Trauchburg went to the Jacobian line of the House of Waldburg. Some lords are referred to in the sources as "bad stewards", i.e. were in constant financial difficulties.

In 1525, during the Peasants' War, the Trauchburg was looted and damaged. In 1546, troops of the Schmalkaldic League occupied the castle. For these reasons, in the 16th century, a zwinger was added to the main castle, reinforced by artillery roundels. The fortifications of the outer bailey were also enhanced at this time.

In the main castle, two staircase towers were added as well as numerous complicated alterations to make the Trauchburg into representative seat of territorial lordship and government. In 1628, the Waldburgs purchased the title of imperial count and moved in 1690 to their schloss at Kißlegg.

In 1729, the now empty Trauchburg was used as a quarry for the new schloss at Kißlegg. Other parts were demolished from 1784 to 1788 for the construction of the castle of Neu-Trauchburg at Isny.

In 1772 the Jacobian line of the Waldburgs died out with Count Francis Charles Eusebius. The estate went to the line of the counts of Waldburg-Zeil and the castle is still owned by this family today.

In 1985, the market town of Weitnau began the renovation and development of the Trauchburg. From 1991, these measures were coordinated with the Bavarian State Department for Heritage Conservation, the Building Archives of Thierhaupten and the Dr. Zeune Office for Castle Research (Eisenberg).

== Description ==
The spur castle is situated on a mountain spur at an elevation of 903 metres above sea level below the Sonneck, one of the low mountain ranges north of the Nagelfluh range in the Allgäu Alps. The castle site is well protected by its natural setting. The mountainsides drop steeply away to the north, east and west. In the north is a large plateau in front of the main castle, in the south the large outer bailey protects the fortress.

The terrain of the outer bailey has been largely changed in modern times. On the rocks in the south the remains of a strong, almost square tower are still visible. This bergfried-like tower was used in post-medieval times as a jail and therefore referred to as the "Diebsturm" ("Thieves' Tower"). Below it there used to be a small round tower in the enceinte. East of the track lie the foundations of a round tower on the steep mountainside; joined to the north by walls. The former castle entrance was also here, behind the gate of the outer bailey and flanked by two small turrets. The castle restaurant and a barn use the foundations of older predecessor fortifications. The western part of the outer bailey is used as beer garden.

The modern wooden bridge over the neck ditch in front of the main castle was built as part of the remodelling in the 16th century. You enter the courtyard of the inner ward by the remains of the gateway. In the north are the ruins of the main building with three cellar rooms on the ground floor. The wooden fixtures and galleries are modern additions.

The high medieval masonry consists of powerful conglomerate ashlars. Particularly striking is the shield wall-like reinforcement of the crescent-shaped northwest side. The post-medieval components are easy to recognize in places from their brickwork. Off the west side is a Zwinger flanked by two massive round towers. The east zwinger has been demolished apart from the stump of another round tower.

Despite the involvement of medieval archaeologist, Joachim Zeune, and the State Department for Heritage Conservation, the renovation of the castle ruin is often criticized as being too rustic. Many modern fixtures allow the walls to be climbed. Zeune obviously could not enforce his concept of a gentle, preservation-only approach to castle restoration here as at Hohenfreyberg Castle.

== Literature ==
- Toni Nessler: Burgen im Allgäu, Band 1: Burgruinen im Altlandkreis Kempten und Altlandkreis Sonthofen. 1st edn. Allgäuer Zeitungsverlag, Kempten, 1985, ISBN 3-88006-102-5, pp. 20–45.
- Georg Dehio: Handbuch der deutschen Kunstdenkmäler. Bayern. Band 3: Schwaben. Bruno Bushart, Georg Paula: Schwaben. Deutscher Kunstverlag, Munich, etc., 1989, ISBN 3-422-03008-5.
