= Inner bailey =

Strongly fortified enclosure at the heart of a medieval castle

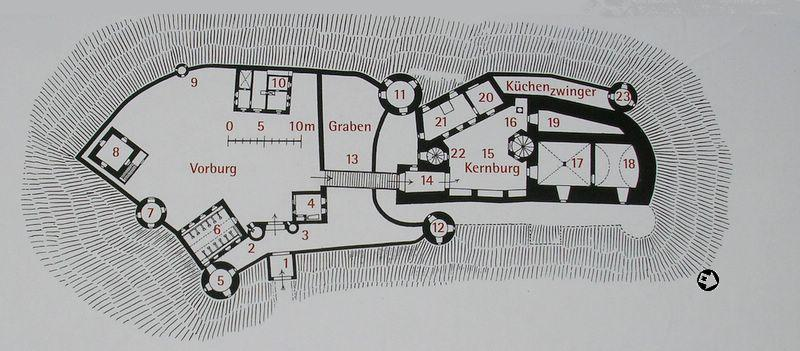
Plan of the outer and inner baileys of Alt-Trauchburg Castle (Germany). The Graben is the neck ditch, and to its right is the inner bailey, accessible over a wooden bridge.

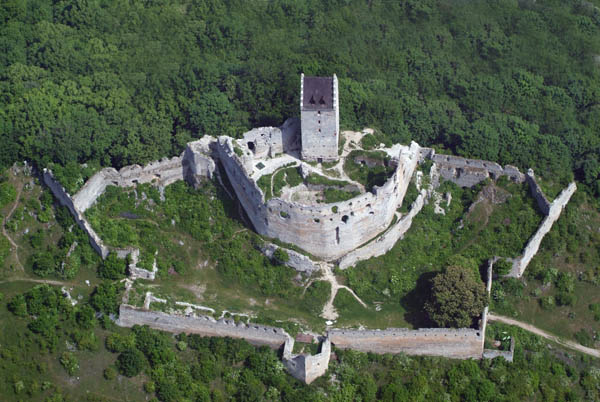
Topoľčany Castle (Slovakia) with an inner and an outer bailey.

The inner bailey or inner ward of a castle is the strongly fortified enclosure at the heart of a medieval castle. It is protected by the outer ward and, sometimes also a Zwinger, moats, a curtain wall and other outworks. Depending on topography it may also be called an upper bailey or upper ward.

The inner bailey enclosed the most important living quarters and defensive elements for the lord and his family, e.g. the great hall, the palas, the tower house and the keep or bergfried. The castle well or cistern was usually found in the inner bailey, because water supplies were particularly important in the past in order to be able to withstand a siege for any length of time.

The inner bailey is usually the oldest part of a castle, because it contains those buildings that were the first to be built during its construction. It often has flanking towers that enabled grazing fire to be brought to bear in front of the curtain wall and gave additional protection to the castle gate.

In complex castles the buildings of the inner ward were frequently grouped in a ring around a courtyard which acted as a central storage area and – if it were large enough – as a tournament arena.

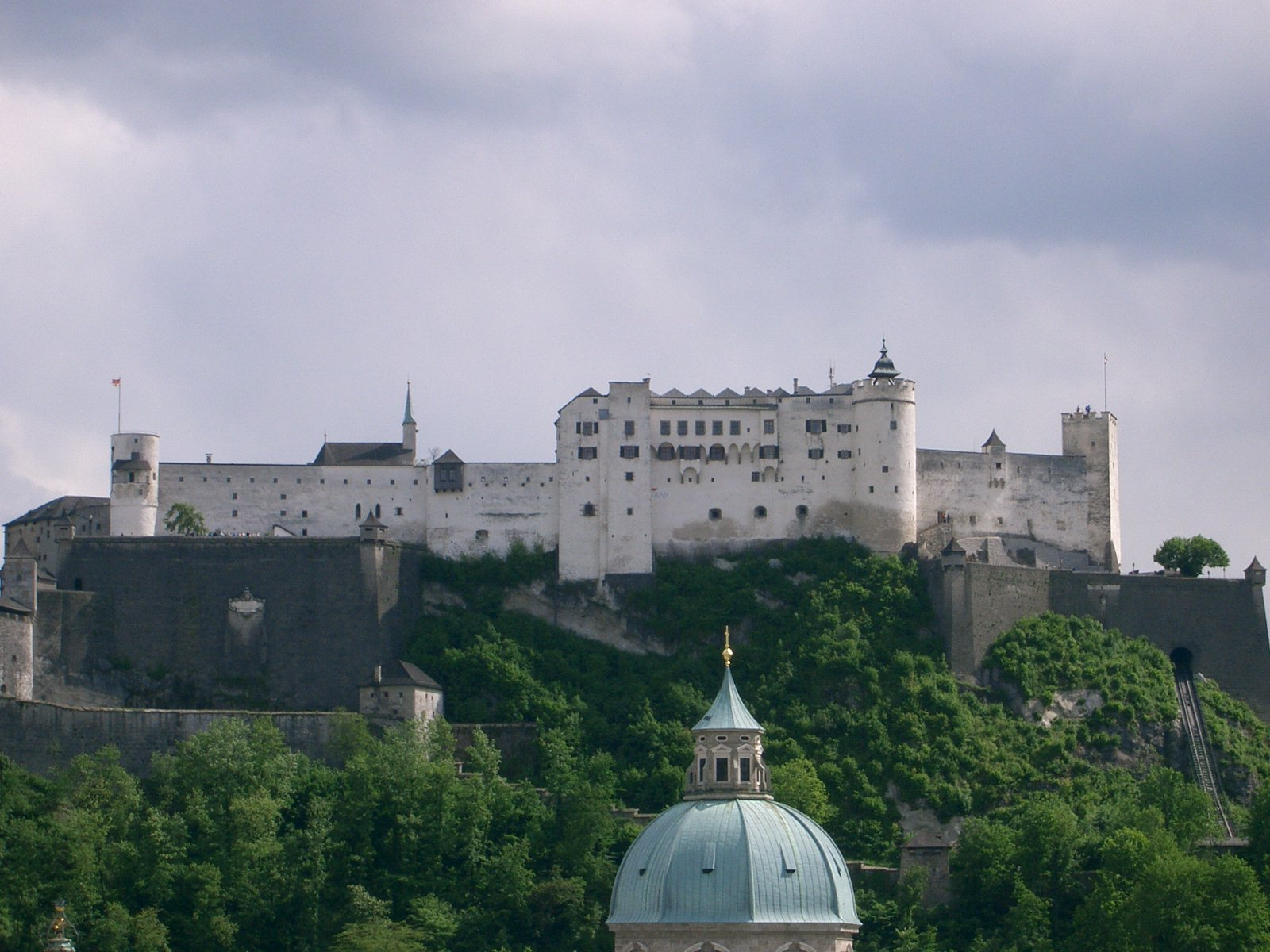
The early modern fortress of Hohensalzburg (Austria) with the old inner bailey in the centre

The terms "upper bailey" or "upper ward" are sometimes used to describe the inner bailey of a hill castle or water castle where the main ward was usually higher than the outer or "lower" bailey. Similarly the Romanesque inner ward of Hohensalzburg Fortress is still called the Hoher Stock ("Upper Storey").

== See also ==
- Bailey (castle)
- Outer bailey
- Motte and bailey

== Literature ==
- Horst Wolfgang Böhme, Reinhard Friedrich, Barbara Schock-Werner (ed.): Wörterbuch der Burgen, Schlösser und Festungen. Philipp Reclam, Stuttgart, 2004, ISBN 3-15-010547-1, p. 169.
