= Gullen (Gemeindeverwaltungsverband) =

- Gemeindeverwaltungsverband
- Location of Gullen within Ravensburg district
- Interactive map of Gullen
- Location within Germany Location within Baden-Württemberg
- Coordinates: 47°45′N 9°39′E
- Country: Germany
- State: Baden-Württemberg
- Admin. region: Tübingen
- District: Ravensburg
- Seat: Grünkraut
- Subdivisions: 4 municipalities

Area
  - Total: 97.03 km^{2} (37.46 sq mi)

Population (2025-12-31)
  - Total: 13,665
  - Density: 140.8/km^{2} (364.8/sq mi)
- Time zone: UTC+01:00 (CET)
  - Summer (DST): UTC+02:00 (CEST)
- Website: www.gvv-gullen.de

Gullen is a Gemeindeverwaltungsverband in the district of Ravensburg in Baden-Württemberg, Germany. The seat of the Gemeindeverwaltungsverband is in Grünkraut.

The Gemeindeverwaltungsverband Gullen consists of the following municipalities:

1. Bodnegg
2. Grünkraut
3. Schlier
4. Waldburg
