= Fürstenberg-Taikowitz =

Fürstenberg coat of arms

Fürstenberg-Taikowitz was a cadet branch of the princely House of Fürstenberg, originally from Swabia in present-day Baden-Württemberg, Germany. It emerged in 1759 as a partition of the Austrian Fürstenberg-Weitra line.

The landgraves resided at Taikowitz Castle in southern Moravia, in the present-day Czech Republic.

== Landgraves of Fürstenberg-Taikowitz in Moravia ==
- Friedrich Joseph Maximilian Augustus (1759-1814)
  - Joseph Friedrich Franz de Paula Vincenz (1777-1840)
  - Friedrich Michael Johann Joseph (1793-1866), the last landgrave of this line and official guardian of Bertha von Suttner

== Properties ==
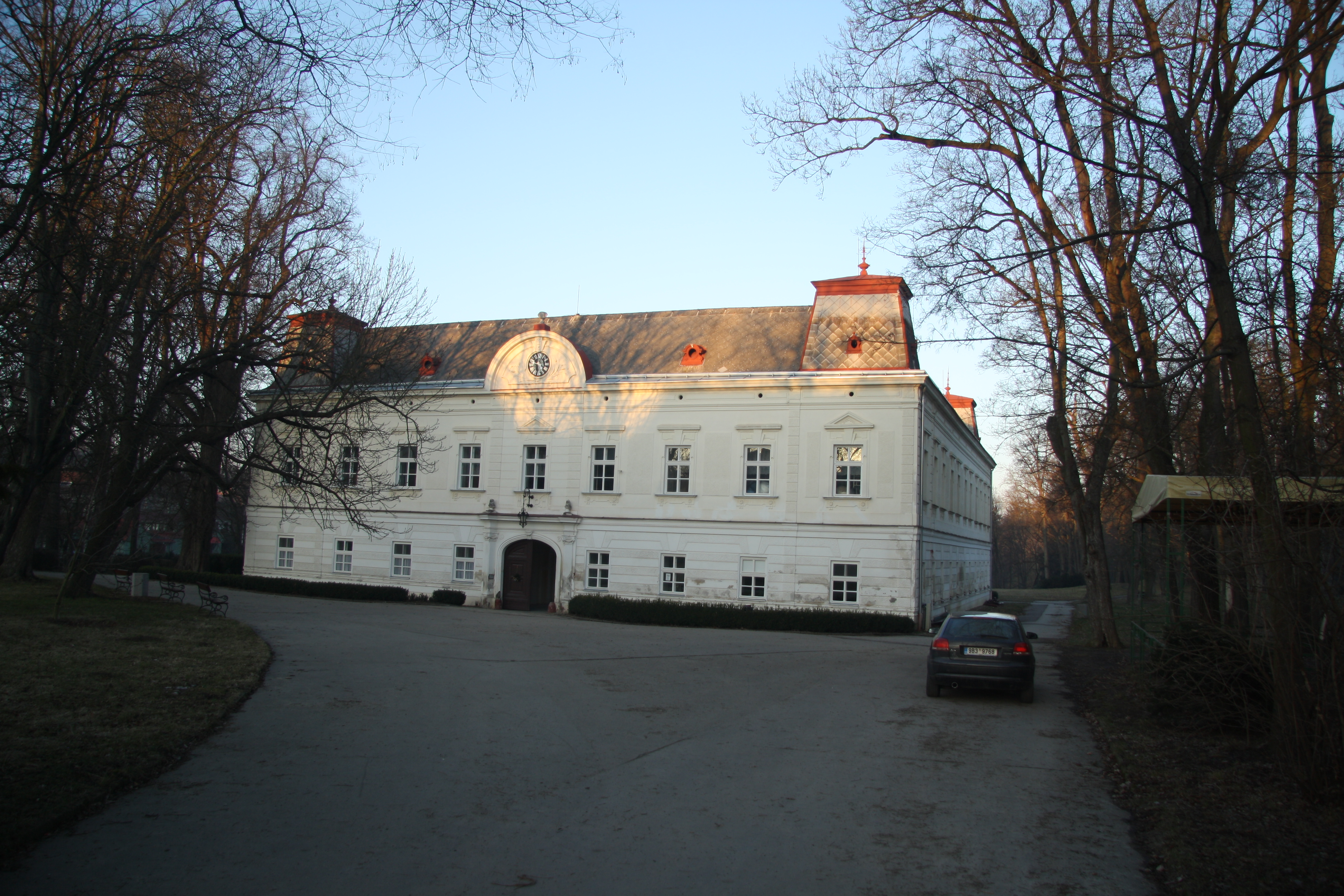
Castle Taikowitz
