= Waldburg Castle =

Waldburg
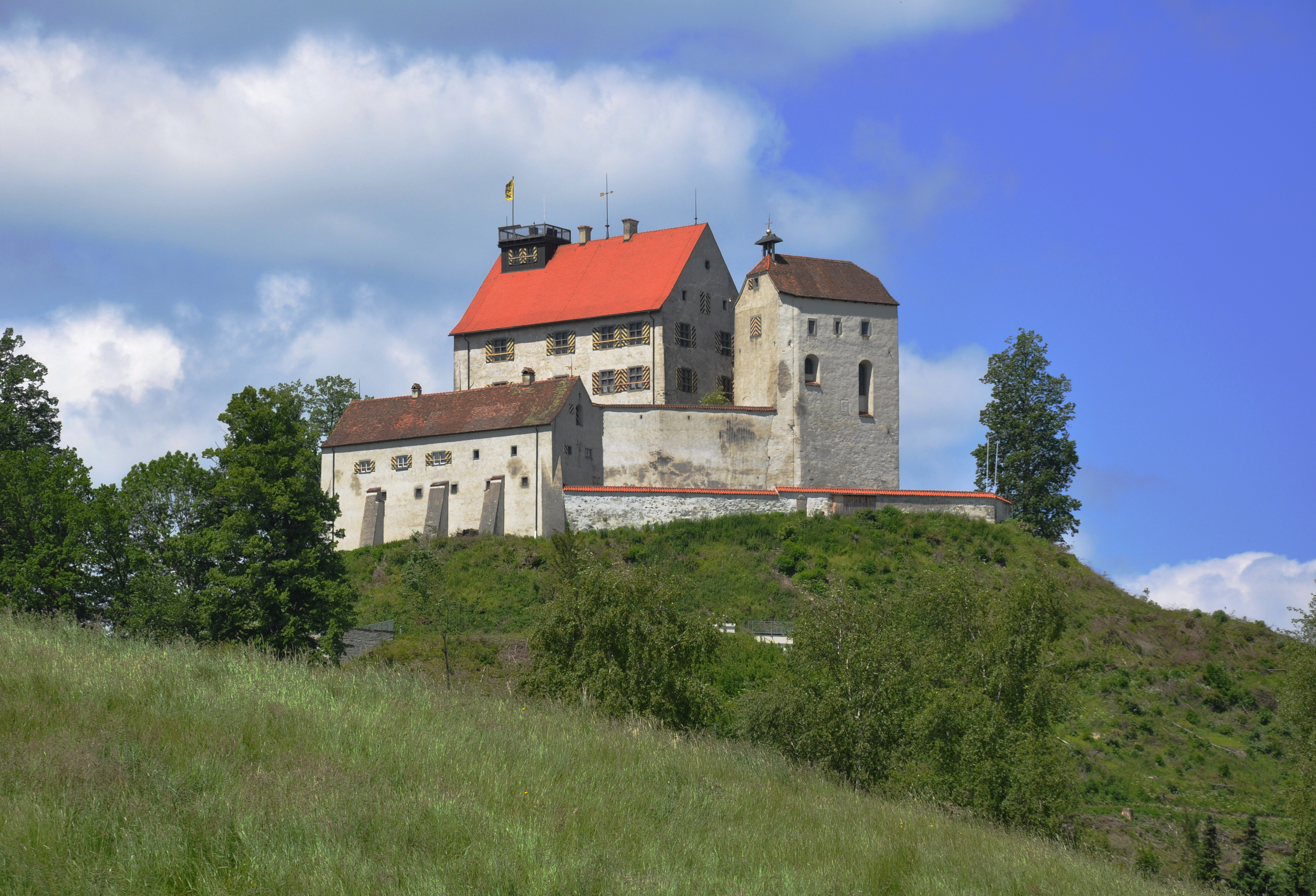
- Waldburg Castle

- Location within Baden-Württemberg Location within Germany

General information
- Architectural style: Fortress
- Classification: Kulturdenkmal (Cultural property)
- Location: Waldburg, Baden-Württemberg, Germany
- Coordinates: 47°45′32″N 09°42′43″E
- Construction started: C. 1100
- Completed: Mid-16th-century
- Owner: Prince Johannes zu Waldburg-Wolfegg und Waldsee

Height
- Height: 772 metres (2,533 ft)

Website
- www.gemeinde-waldburg.de (in German)

The Waldburg (English: Forest castle) is the ancestral castle of the stewards, Imperial Counts and later Imperial Princes from the House of Waldburg. It dates from the 12th century and stands on the march of the municipality Waldburg in the district of Ravensburg, applies as one of the best preserved medieval buildings, and is one of the landmarks and the highest point in Upper Swabia.

== Geographical situation ==
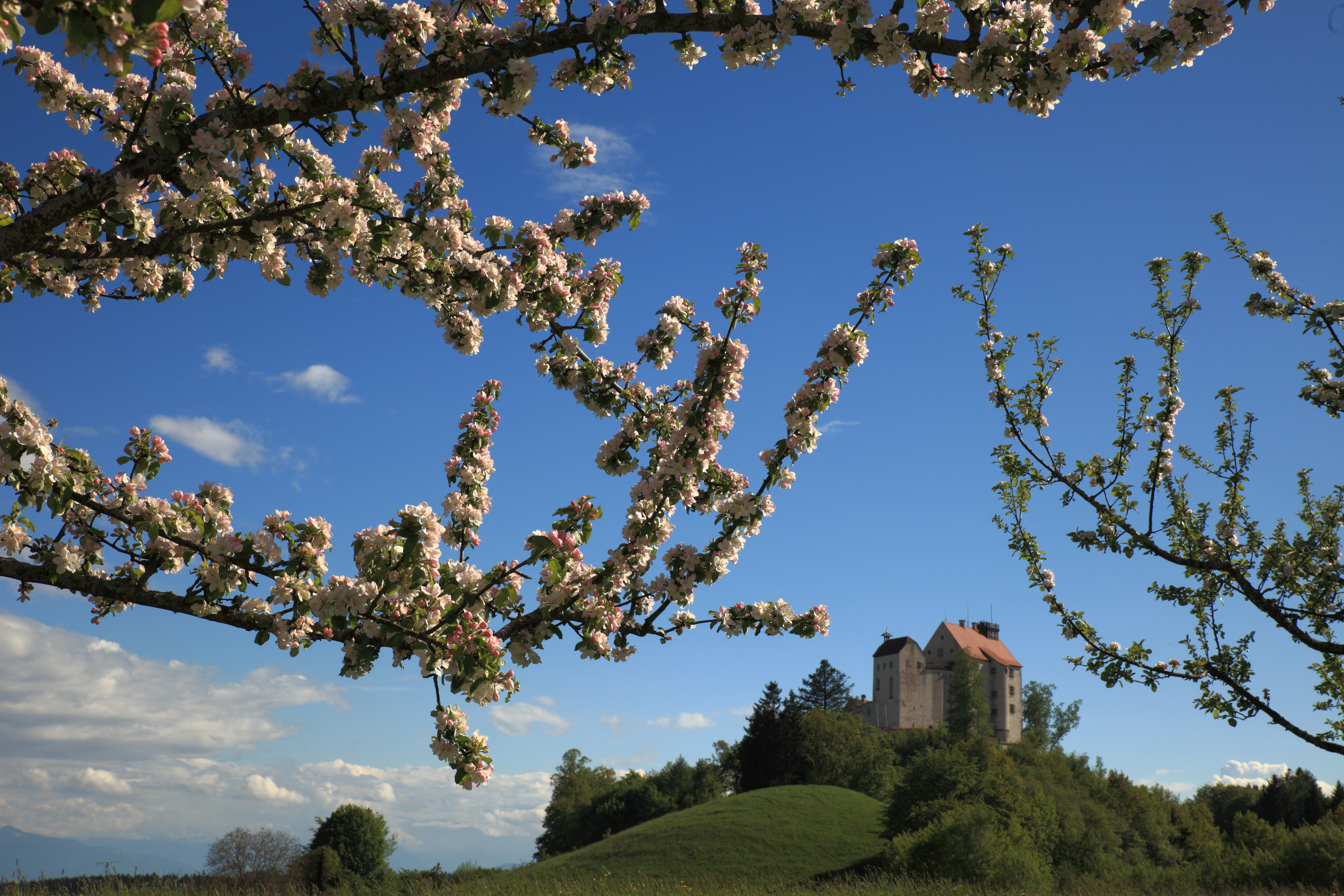
The hill castle on the top of the drumlin from northwest

The Waldburg is a Hilltop castle located on a natural elevation, a drumlin from the last glacial period, at 772 metres (2,533 ft) height above sea level. The raised situation with view (when suitable weather conditions) to the west up to the Hohentwiel near Singen, to the north up to the Ulm Minster, to the east far back in the Alpine foothills and southwards far into the Swiss Alps and the Lake Constance made the Waldburg to an important trigonometric point also for land surveying in the early 19th century of the ordnance survey. The steepen drumlin already offers by his very big slope angle an almost ideal military protection for a castle construction, however, complicated also the building and expansion more than seven centuries considerably.

The hill castle was very woody till the 1980s. The view at the castle was moved again in the old condition for the public reopening in 1996 by specific deforestation in the beginning of the nineties. During the day, as well as at night with lighting, the castle is a very striking and important landmark in Upper Swabian.

== History ==
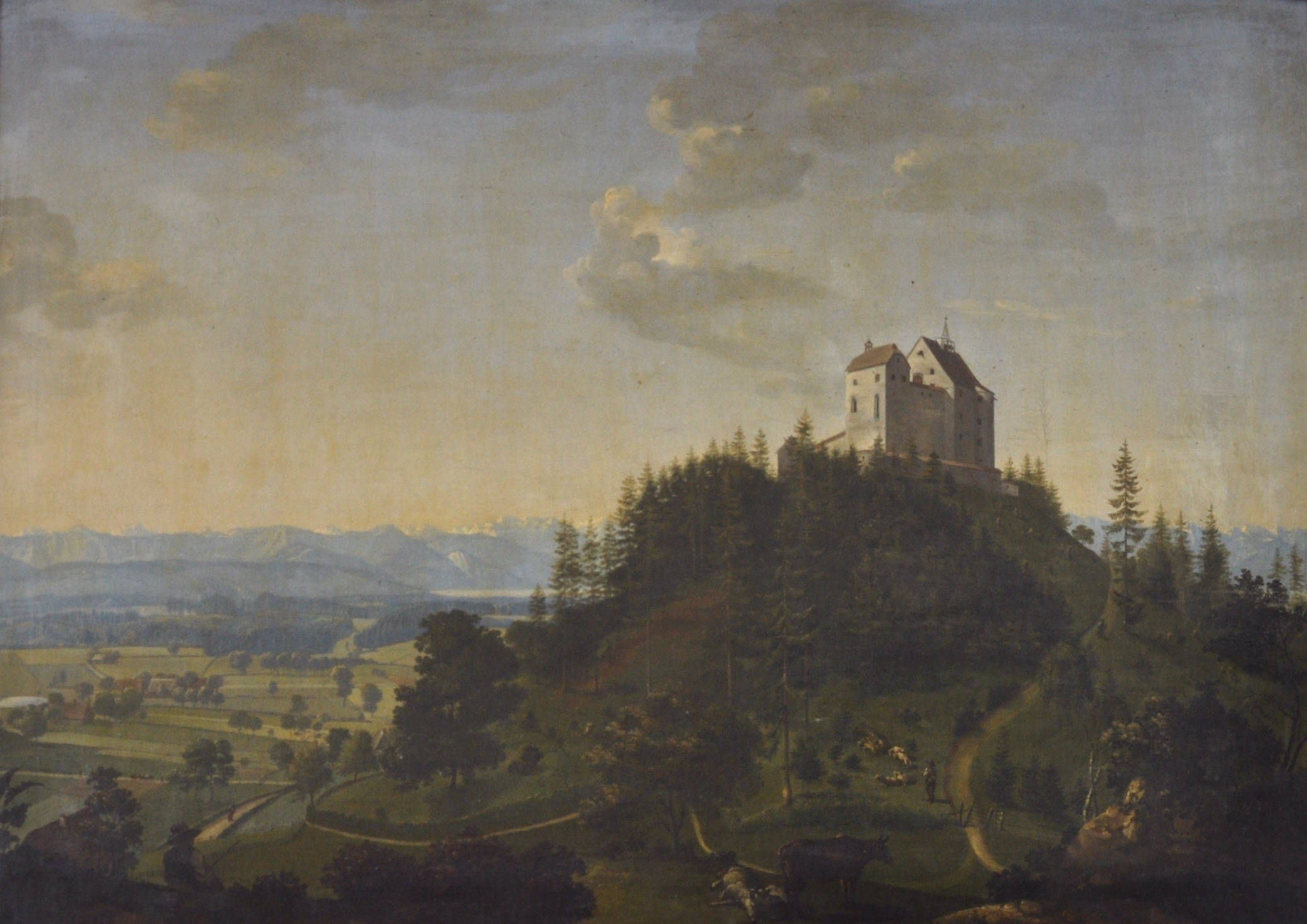
Historical view from north-east, painting by Johann Georg Sauter, 1845.

The first foundation of the castle goes back to the 11th century. In this time the family of Waldburg received an official fief from the Guelphs. In the first half of the 13th century the castle was radically rebuilt, the palas was anew established up to the second upper floor.

Under Emperor Frederick II the Imperial Regalia were kept in the castle from 1220 to at least 1240. In 1327 the church Saint Magnus was built at feet of the castle.

At the middle of the 16th century under steward Georg IV of Waldburg the castle was developed to a residence similar to a palace. From the 17th century the castle was inhabited only sporadically by the family of Waldburg and the building activity decreased.

== Coat of Arms ==
Waldburg, Coat of Arms

The Waldburg coat of arms depicts three black lions or alternatively leopards on a golden background. These three lions were already used by the House of Waldburg as their family crest in 1222 under the Hohenstaufen Emperor Frederick II. After the beheading of the last Hohenstaufen Conradin, the Waldburg family adopted and continued the Hohenstaufen lions. The red bar represents the Waldburg's blood jurisdiction. The imperial orb represents the office of Steward at the Waldburg. Since 1526, the title of Reichserbtruchsess, 'Imperial Hereditary Steward', has been an inheritable office of the Waldburgs.

== Present utilization ==
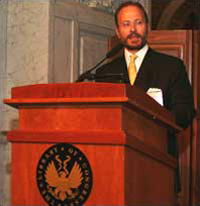
Prince Johannes zu Waldburg-Wolfegg speaks about his family's ownership of the Waldseemüller map in the Great Hall at the reception of the Thomas Jefferson Building for the opening of the Lewis and Clark exhibition.

Today the Schloss accommodates a museum and is opened for sightseeing during the warm seasons from early April until late October. Guided tours are held on weekends and holidays at 1:30 pm and 3:00 pm. At the top of the roof there is a vista platform with a look around as far as eye can see.

The museum shows exhibits to the history of the castle from the Middle Ages on the basis of documents, paintings as well as fitments and basic commodities and to the development of the ordnance survey. The walking tour begins in the ground floor with the late Middle Ages and ends in the third upper floor with the collections of the 19th and 20th century. The Holy Lance, the Imperial Sceptre and the Imperial Orb are exhibited as replicas, since 2013 there is also presented a copy of the Imperial Crown.

A special feature of the exhibition is a Facsimile of the printed wall map of the world by German cartographer Martin Waldseemüller where the continent and the name America appeared for the first time, originally published in April 1507. The Federal Republic of Germany consigned the original in 2007 to the Library of Congress in Washington, DC.

The castle chapel is used for church weddings. Parts of the museum and the vaults are also available for wedding celebrations. The Burgschenke, the castle inn, is the former kitchen in the imperial castle; there are offered dishes after original recipes of the Medieval cuisine.

== See also ==
- Schloss Wolfegg
