= House of Waldburg =

German aristocratic family

Coat of Arms of Waldburg

The House of Waldburg is a princely family of Upper Swabia, founded some time previous to the 12th century; some cadet lineages are comital families. As one of a small number of mediatized houses, the family belongs to the High nobility (ancient nobility).

Eberhard von Tanne-Waldburg (? – 1234) was the steward, or seneschal, and adviser of the Staufen dukes of Swabia, and later the adviser of the Emperor Friedrich II. During the anti-Staufen uprising, he and his brother Friedrich von Tanne took opposing sides. Friedrich was killed in 1197 in Montefiascone and Eberhard became the guardian of his nephew, Heinrich, until 1220. Subsequently, he and his nephew administered Swabia during the absence of the emperors. He was entrusted with the imperial regalia that was kept at Waldburg from 1220–1225, hence the name "seneshal," or steward. Eberhard was the founding "father" of the Waldburg lines, and from him the medieval, early modern, and modern lines descend.

== History ==
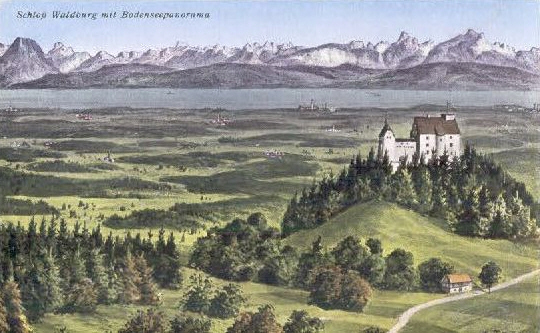
Waldburg Castle in the eastern Bodensee region

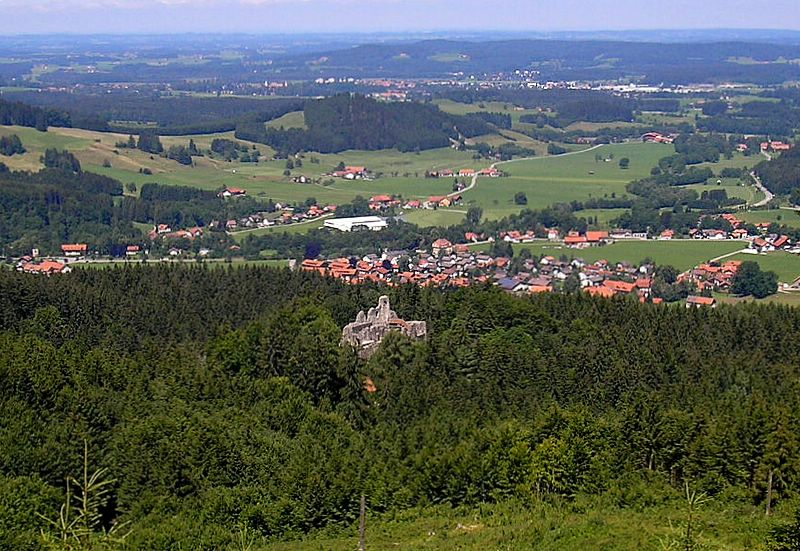
Ruins of Alttrauchburg castle

=== Alttrauchburg ===
In 1258 the fief of Alttrauchburg had been given to the stewards of Waldburg, who purchased it outright in 1306 from the count, who had run into debt. The tower-like core structure was now extended and built on. To the south, the large outer bailey was laid out together with its strong, rectangular, advanced tower.

As a result, the Waldburgs mostly lived in the castle by themselves or let had it managed by vogts (1418 Hans von Mühlegg). In 1429, the Trauchburg went to the Jacobian line of the family. Some lords are referred to in the sources as "bad stewards", i.e. were in constant financial difficulties.

As a result of suffering capture and damage in various conflicts, the castle of Alttrauchburg was expanded and strengthened in the 16th century and upgraded into a representative seat of territorial lordship and government. In 1628, the Waldburgs became imperial counts and moved in 1690 to their schloss at Kißlegg, abandoning their seat at Trauchburg and using it as a quarry for the new schloss at Kißlegg.

In 1772 the Jacobian line of the Waldburgs died out with Count Francis Charles Eusebius. The estate went to the line of the counts of Waldburg-Zeil and the castle is still owned by this family today.

== Notable members ==
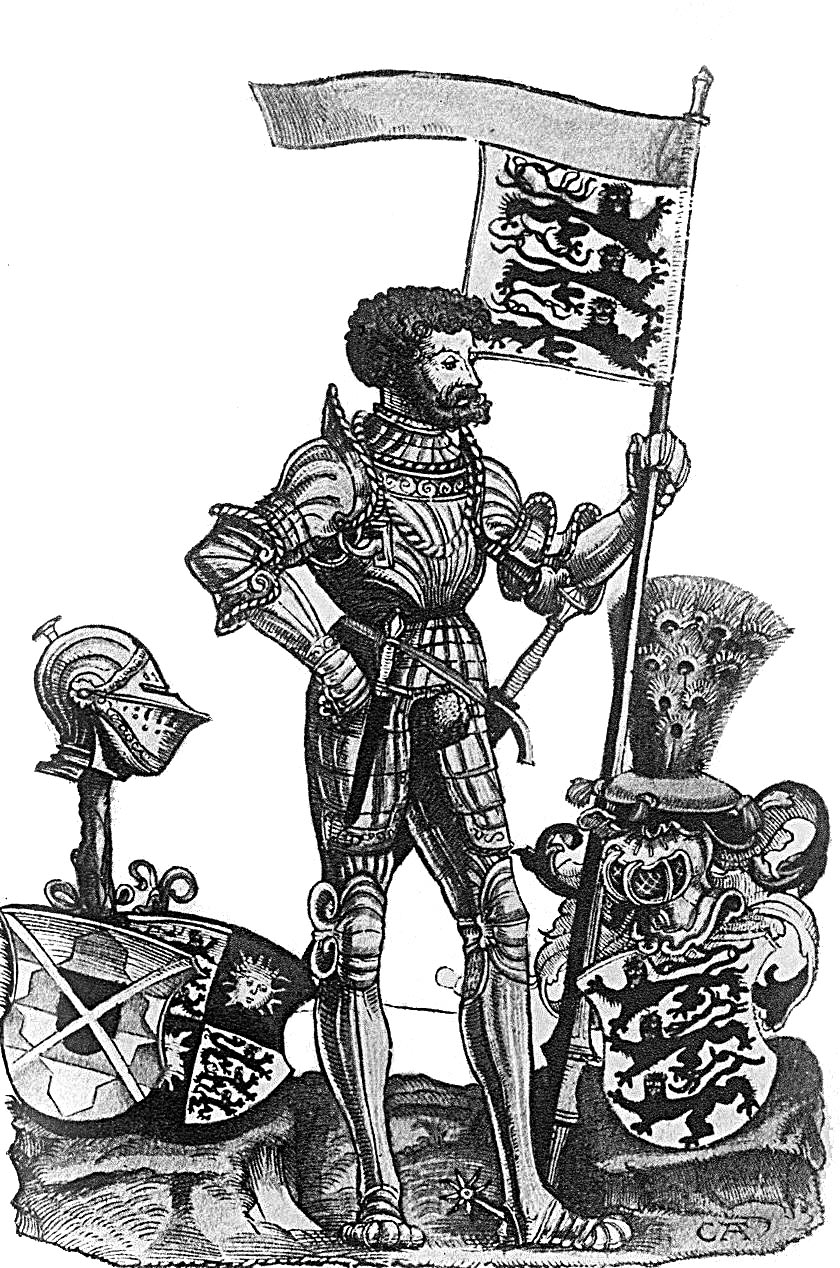
Georg Truchsess von Waldburg defeated the Peasant Army in 1525

- Conrad of Winterstetten (d. 1243), imperial butler, procurator of Swabia, guardian of Henry (VII) and Conrad IV
- Georg Truchsess von Waldburg, (25 January 1488 – 29 May 1531), also known as Bauernjörg. He was born in Waldsee, the son of Johannes d. j. v. Waldburg and Helene Countess von Zollern. At Böblingen 12 May 1525 in one of the bloodiest battles of the German Peasants' War, Jörg Truchsess von Waldburg attacked a force of 15,000 armed peasants, of whom 3,000 were killed. Married Appolonia von Waldburg-Sonnenberg in 1509; and, second, to Maria von Oettingen (11 April 1498 – 18 August 1555). Georg III ("Bauernjörg"), des H.R.R. Erbtruchseß (1519–1531), Field Captain of the Swabian League.
- Otto Truchsess von Waldburg
- Christoph Truchsess von Waldburg (d. 1612)
- Gebhard Truchsess von Waldburg (1546–1601). Archbishop and Prince-Elector of Cologne, 1577–1588. See also Cologne War
- Karl, Truchsess von Waldburg (1547–1593)
- Sigmund Christoph von Waldburg (1754–1814), the last bishop of Chiemsee.
- Alois Graf von Waldburg-Zeil (1933-2014), German politician, manager and landowner
- Clemens Graf von Waldburg-Zeil (born 1960), German entrepreneur, manager and landowner

== Comital families ==
- Waldburg-Waldburg
- Waldburg-Capustigall
- Waldburg-Wurzach
- Waldburg-Sonnenburg
- Waldburg-Friedburg-Scheer
- Waldburg-Wolfegg-Zeil
- Waldburg-Waldsee
- Waldburg-Scheer
- Waldburg-Trauchburg
- Waldburg-Wolfegg
- Waldburg-Zeil

== Notable castles ==
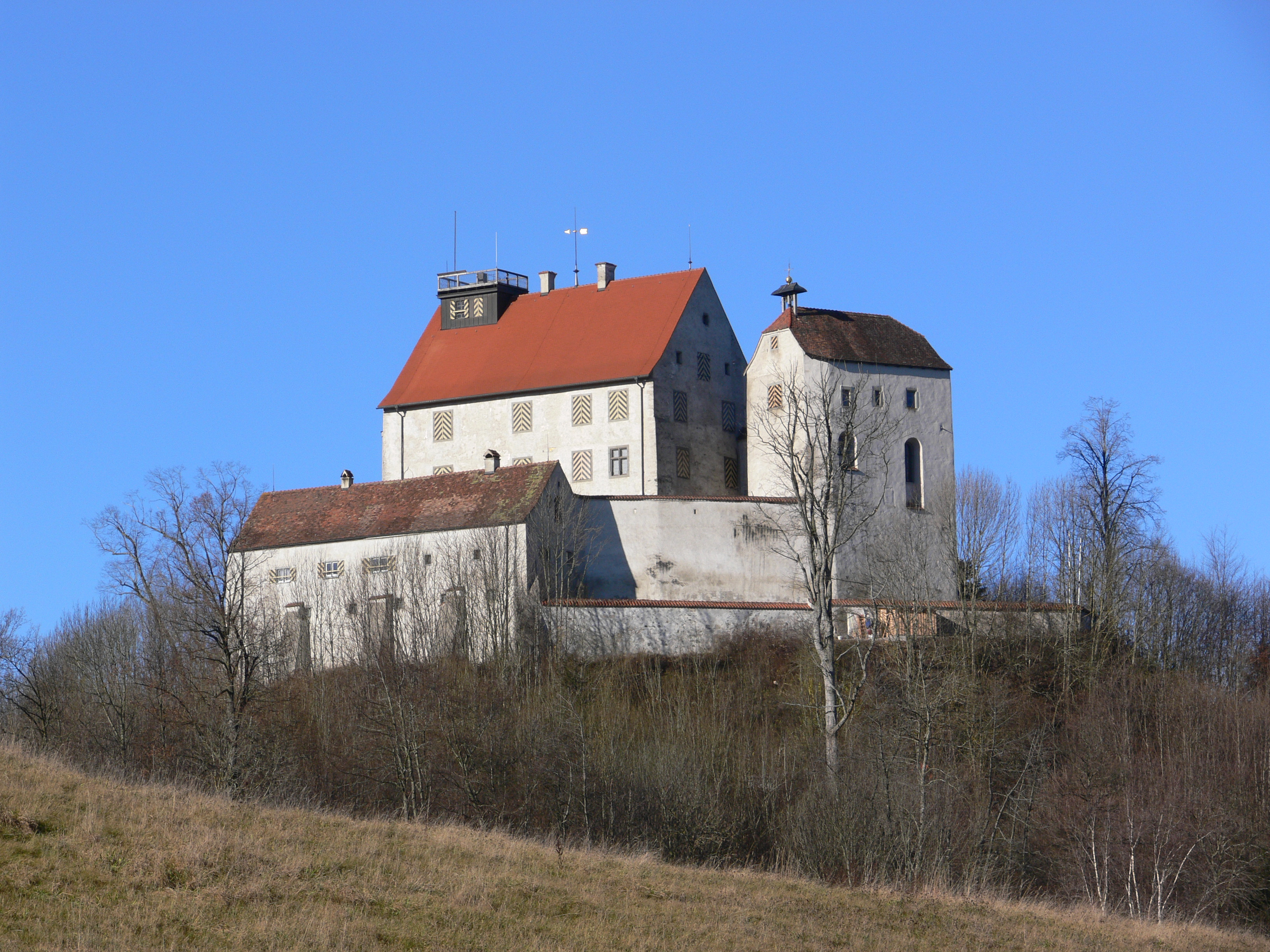
Waldburg Castle

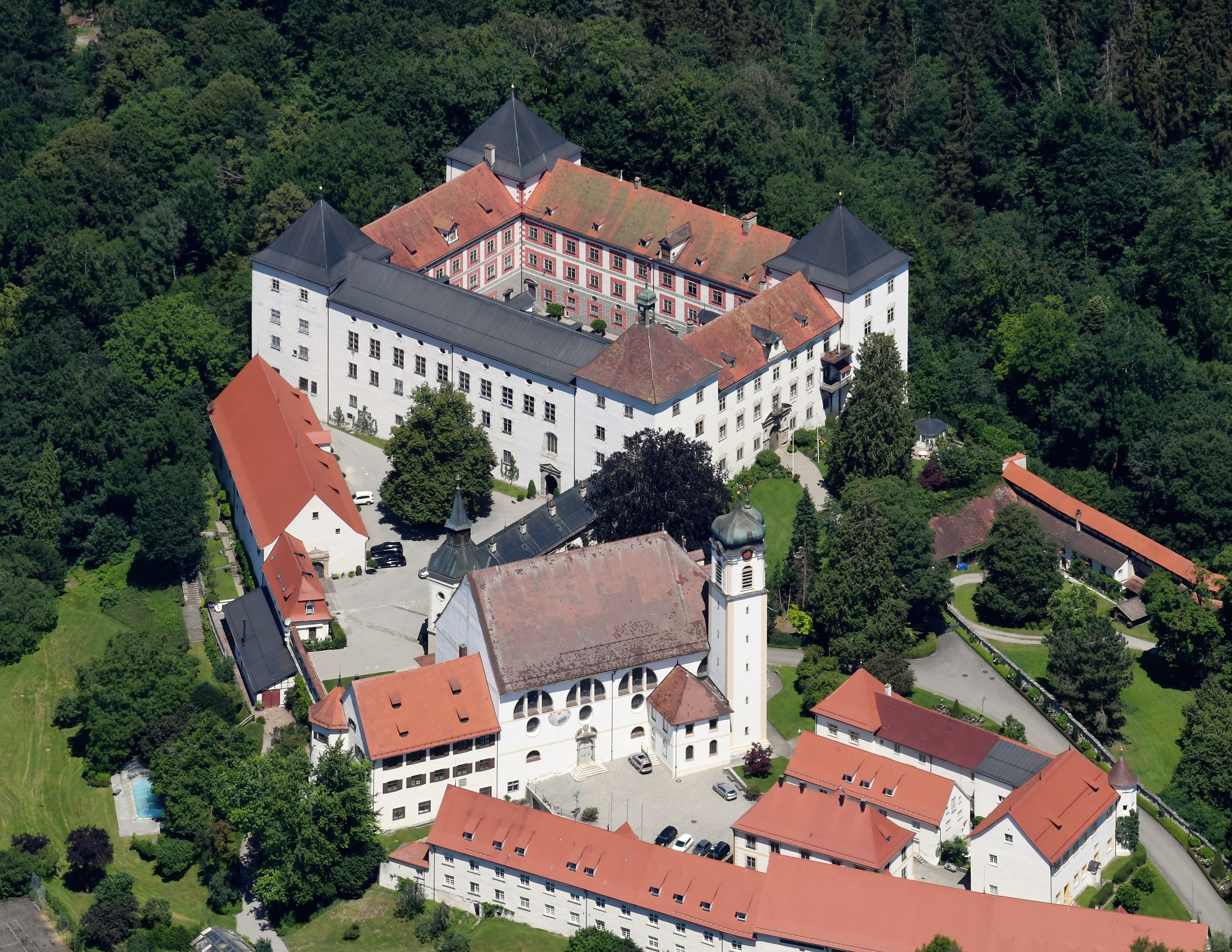
Wolfegg Castle

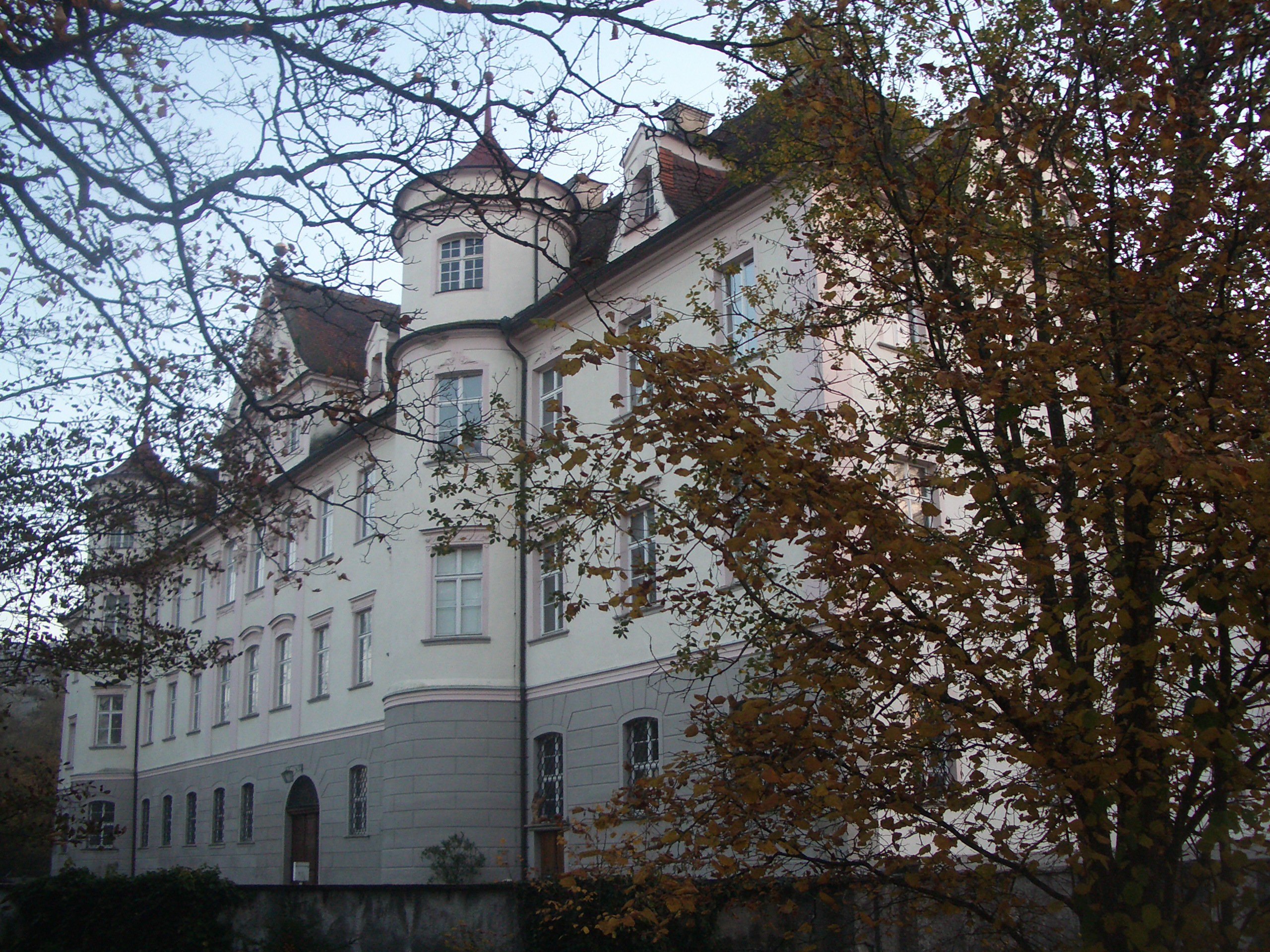
Waldsee Castle

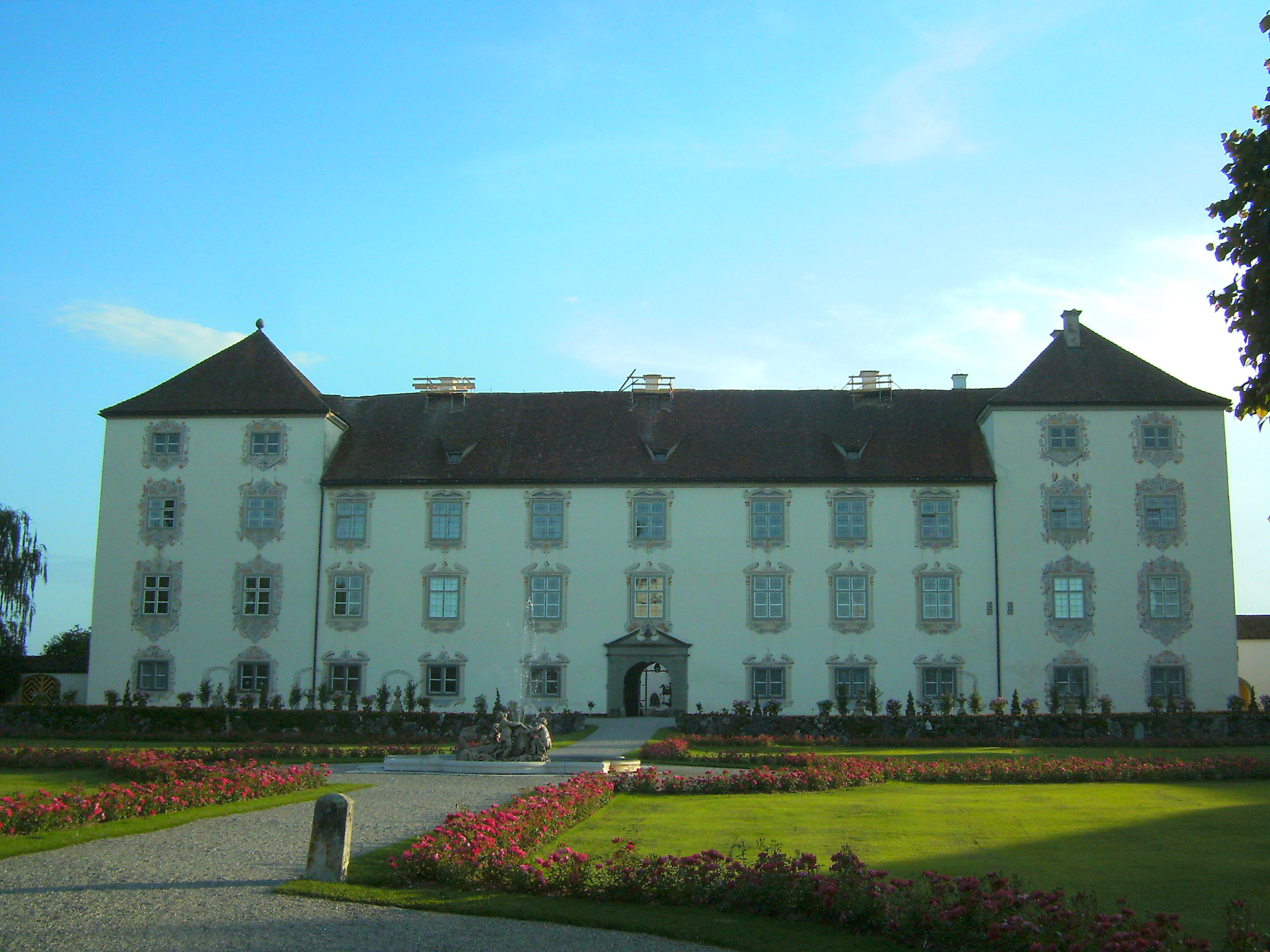
Zeil Castle near Leutkirch

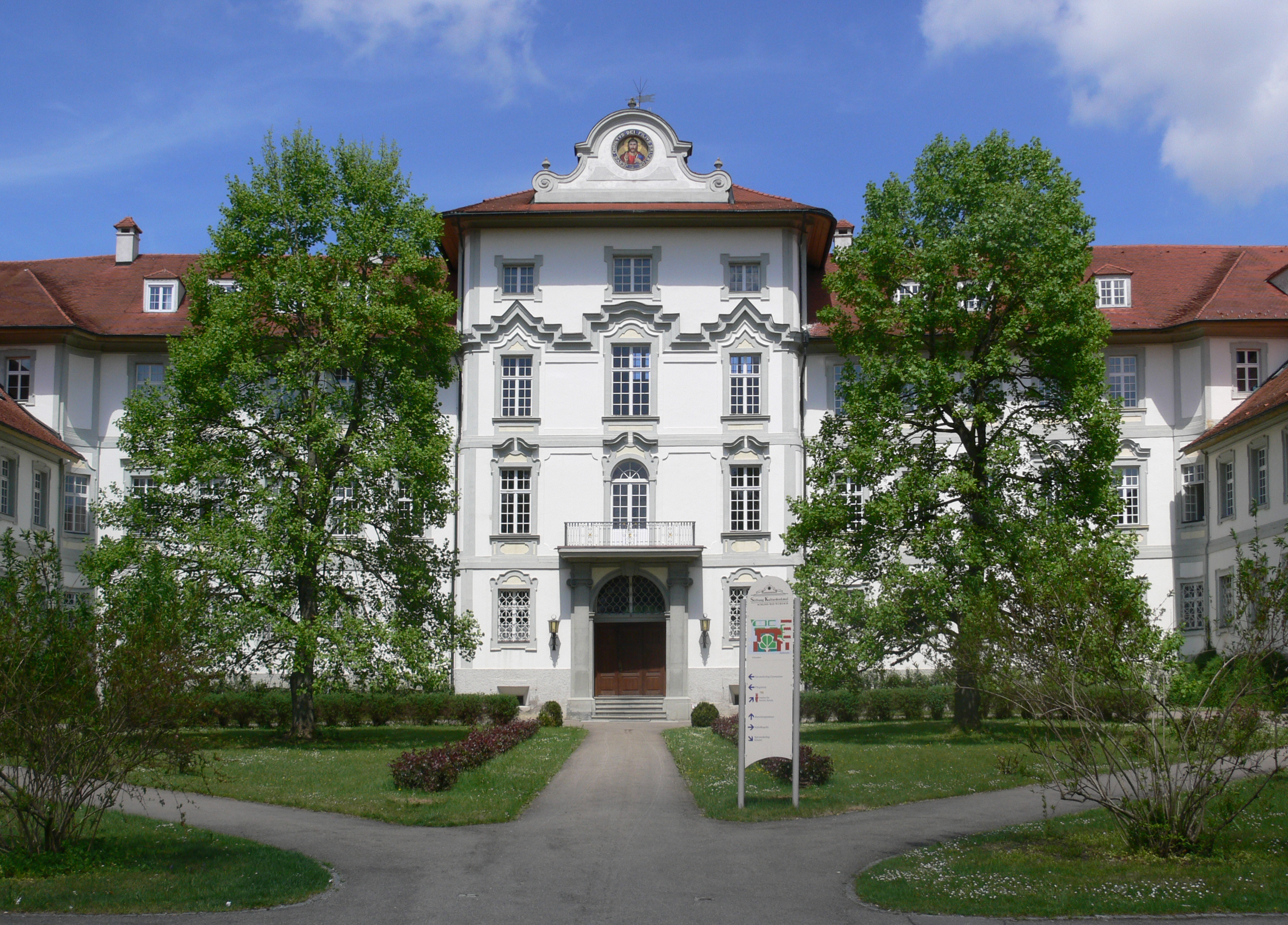
Wurzach Castle

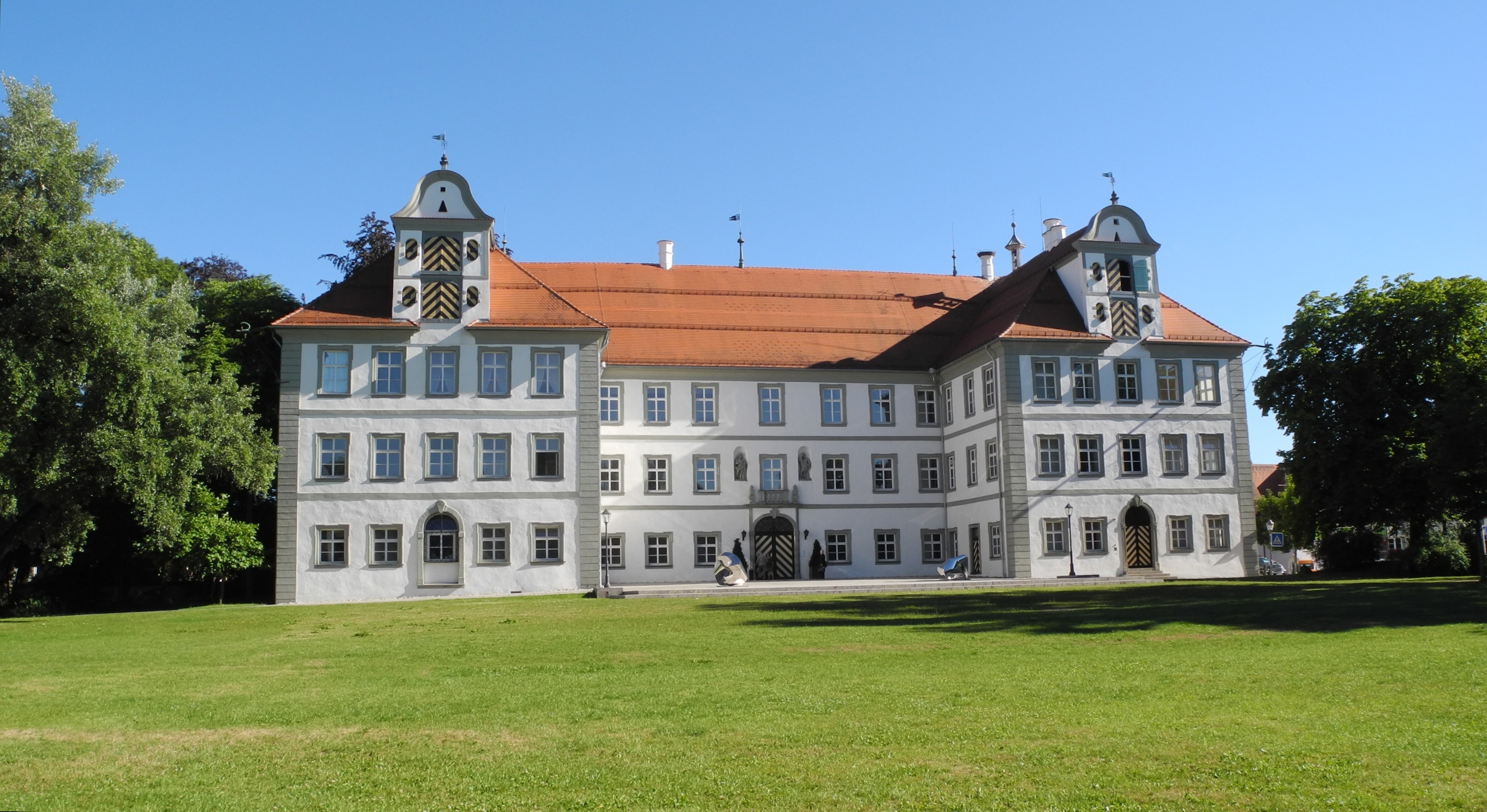
New Castle at Kißlegg

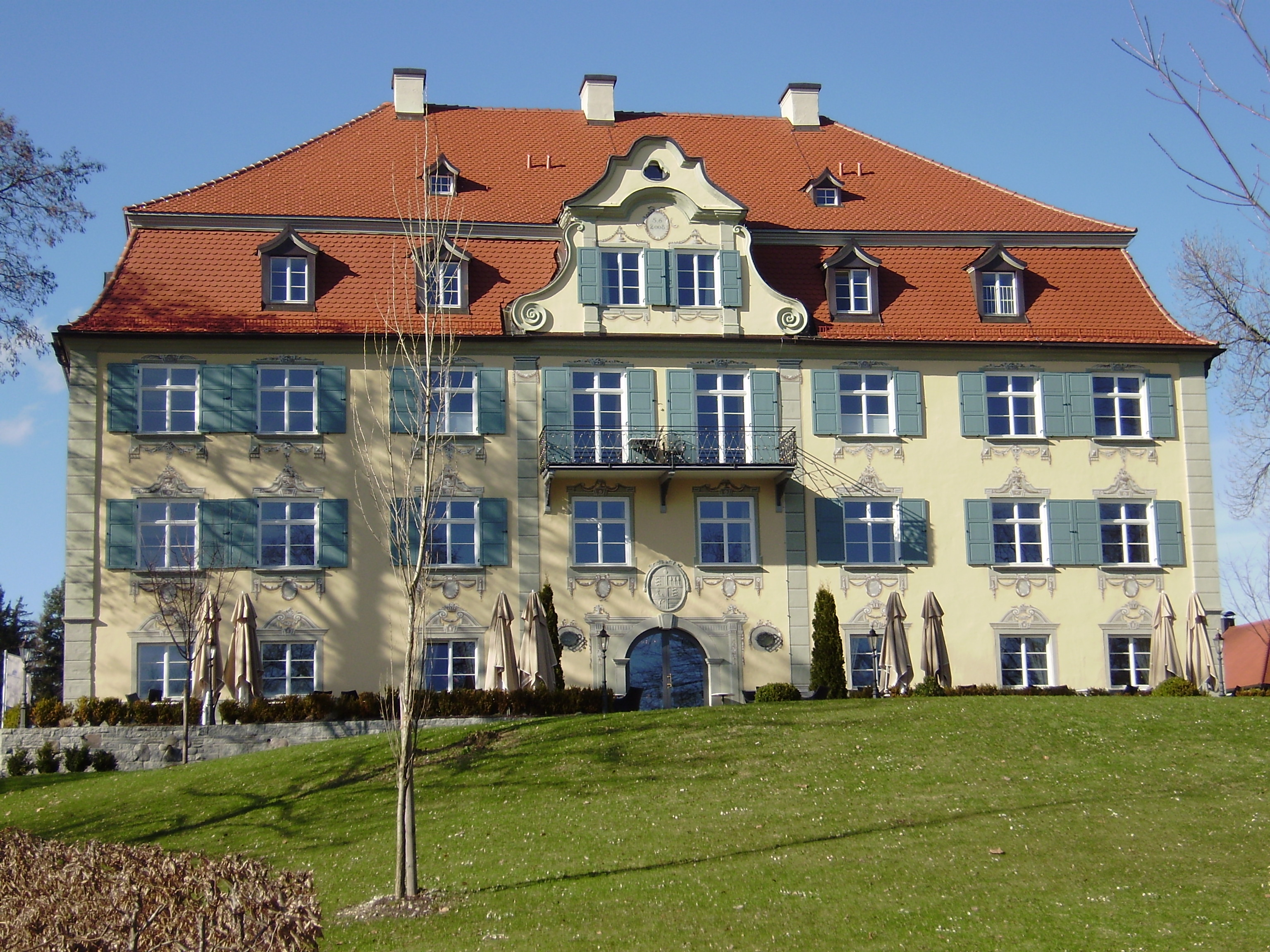
Neutrauchburg Castle

Hohenems Palace, Austria

== Sources ==
Citations and notes

Bibliography

- (in German) Gollwitzer, Heinz, Die Standesherren. Die politische und gesellschaftliche Stellung der Mediatisierten 1815-1918, Stuttgart 1957, Göttingen 1964.
