= Waldburg-Capustigall =

European polity

Stewardship (County) of Waldburg-Capustigall Truchsessamt (Grafschaft) Waldburg-Capustigall
- 1504–1745
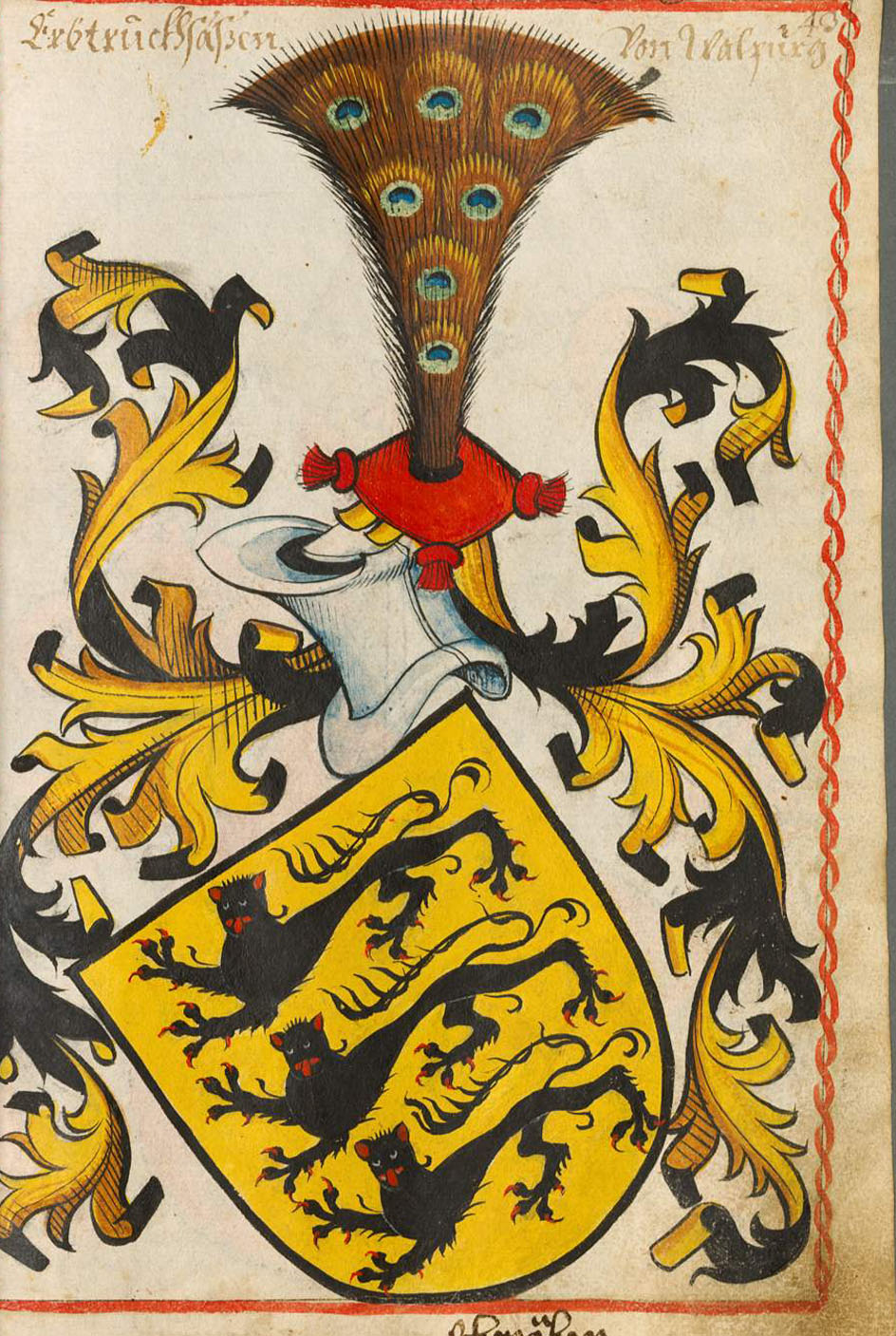
- Coat of arms
- Status: State of the Holy Roman Empire
- Common languages: German
- Government: Principality
- Historical era: Middle Ages
  - Partitioned from Waldburg-Trauchburg: 1504 1504
  - Raised to County: 1686
  - Annexed by Prussia: 1745
Preceded by	Succeeded by
Waldburg-Trauchburg	Kingdom of Prussia

Waldburg-Capustigall was a Stewardship of the House of Waldburg – later a County – located in East Prussia. Waldburg-Capustigall was a partition of Waldburg-Trauchburg and was raised to a County in 1686, before being annexed by the Kingdom of Prussia in 1745.

== Rulers of Waldburg-Capustigall ==
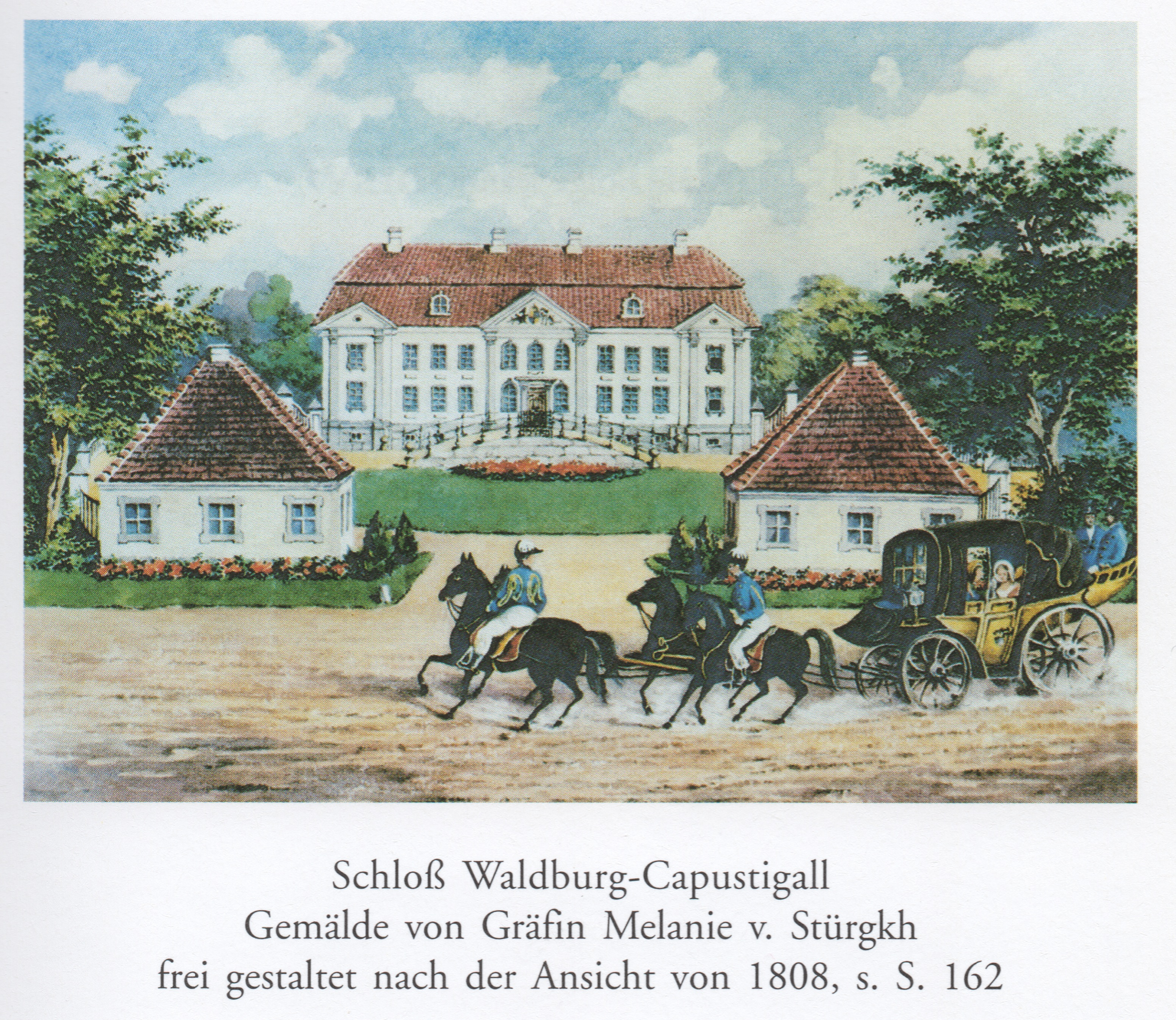
The Schloss of Waldburg-Capustigall

=== Stewards of Waldburg-Capustigall ===
- Johannes Jakob, 1554–1585
- Wolfgang Heinrich, 1585–1637
- Johannes Albert, 1637–1655
- Abraham, 1637–1638

- Wolfgang Christoph (Reichsgraf 1686), 1643–1688

- Karl Ludwig, 1685–1738

- Joachim Heinrich, 1655–1703

- Friedrich Sebastian Wunibald, 1677–1745

- Wolfgang Christoph, 1643–1686 (raised to Reichsgraf)

=== Counts of Waldburg-Capustigall ===
- Wolfgang Christoph, 1686–1688
- Joachim Heinrich, 1655–1703
- Otto Wilhelm I, 1703–1725
- Karl Friedrich, 1703–1722
- Otto Wilhelm II, 1725–1745
