= County of Sonnenberg =

European polity

County of Sonnenberg Grafschaft Sonnenberg
- 1424–1511
- Coat of arms
- Status: County
- Capital: Nüziders-Sonnenberg
- Common languages: Alemannic German
- Historical era: Middle Ages
  - Partitioned from Waldburg: 1424
  - Annexed by Austria: 1511
Preceded by	Succeeded by
Waldburg	Archduchy of Austria

Sonnenberg was a county ruled by the Eberhard branch of the comital Waldburg family of Upper Swabia, located around Nüziders-Sonnenberg in Vorarlberg, then part of Tyrol (Austria).

Sonnenberg was a partition of Waldburg and was annexed by the Archduchy of Austria in 1511.

The Habsburg monarchs continued carrying the title of "Count of Sonnenberg" in the grand title of the Emperor of Austria.
