= Waldburg-Friedburg-Scheer =

County of Waldburg-Friedburg-Scheer Grafschaft Waldburg-Friedburg-Scheer
- 1612–1717
- Status: State of the Holy Roman Empire
- Common languages: Alemannic German
- Government: Principality
- Historical era: Middle Ages
  - Partitioned from Waldburg-Trauchburg: 1612
  - Restored to Waldburg-Trauchburg: 1717
Preceded by	Succeeded by
Waldburg-Trauchburg	Waldburg-Trauchburg

Waldburg-Friedburg-Scheer was a County ruled by the House of Waldburg, located in southeastern Baden-Württemberg, Germany. Waldburg-Friedburg-Scheer was a partition of Waldburg-Trauchburg, to which it was restored in 1717.
