= Waldburg-Scheer =

County of Waldburg-Scheer Grafschaft Waldburg-Scheer
- 1717–1764
- Status: State of the Holy Roman Empire
- Common languages: Alemannic German
- Government: Principality
- Reichsgraf
  - 1717–56: Joseph William Eusebius
  - 1756–64: Leopold Augustus
- Historical era: Middle Ages
  - Partitioned from Waldburg-Trauchburg: 1717
  - Restored to Waldburg-Trauchburg: 1764
Preceded by	Succeeded by
Waldburg-Trauchburg	Waldburg-Trauchburg

Waldburg-Scheer was a County ruled by the House of Waldburg, located in southeastern Baden-Württemberg, Germany. Waldburg-Scheer was a partition of Waldburg-Trauchburg, to which it was restored in 1764.

== Counts of Waldburg-Scheer ==
- Joseph William Eusebius, 1717–56
- Leopold Augustus, 1756–64

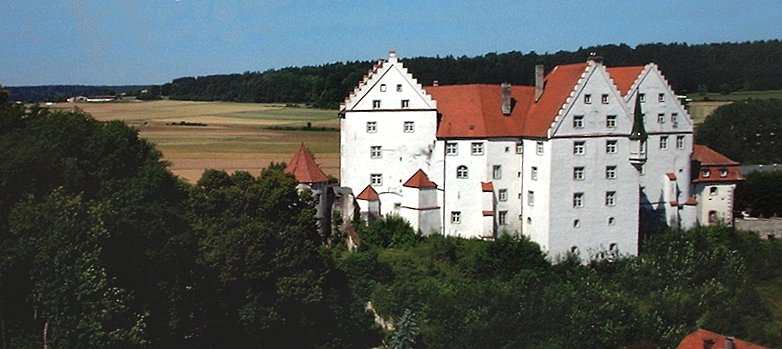
Scheer Castel
