= Waldburg-Trauchburg =

German polity

County of Waldburg-Trauchburg Grafschaft Waldburg-Trauchburg
- 1424–1772
- Status: State of the Holy Roman Empire
- Common languages: Alemannic German
- Government: Principality
- Historical era: Middle Ages
  - Partitioned from Waldburg: 1424
  - Partitioned, part to Waldburg-Capustigall: 1504
  - Partitioned, part to Waldburg-Friedburg-Scheer: 1612–1717
  - Partitioned, part to Waldburg-Scheer: 1717–64
  - Annexed by Waldburg-Zeil: 1772
| Preceded by | Succeeded by |
| Waldburg | Waldburg-Zeil |

Waldburg-Trauchburg was a County within Holy Roman Empire, ruled by the House of Waldburg, located in southeastern Baden-Württemberg, Germany. Waldburg-Trauchburg was a partition of Waldburg and was partitioned several times, before being annexed by the County of Waldburg-Zeil (another partition of Waldburg) in 1772.
