= Rudolf-Harbig-Stadion =

Football stadium in Dresden, Germany

Coordinates: 51°02′25″N 13°44′52″E

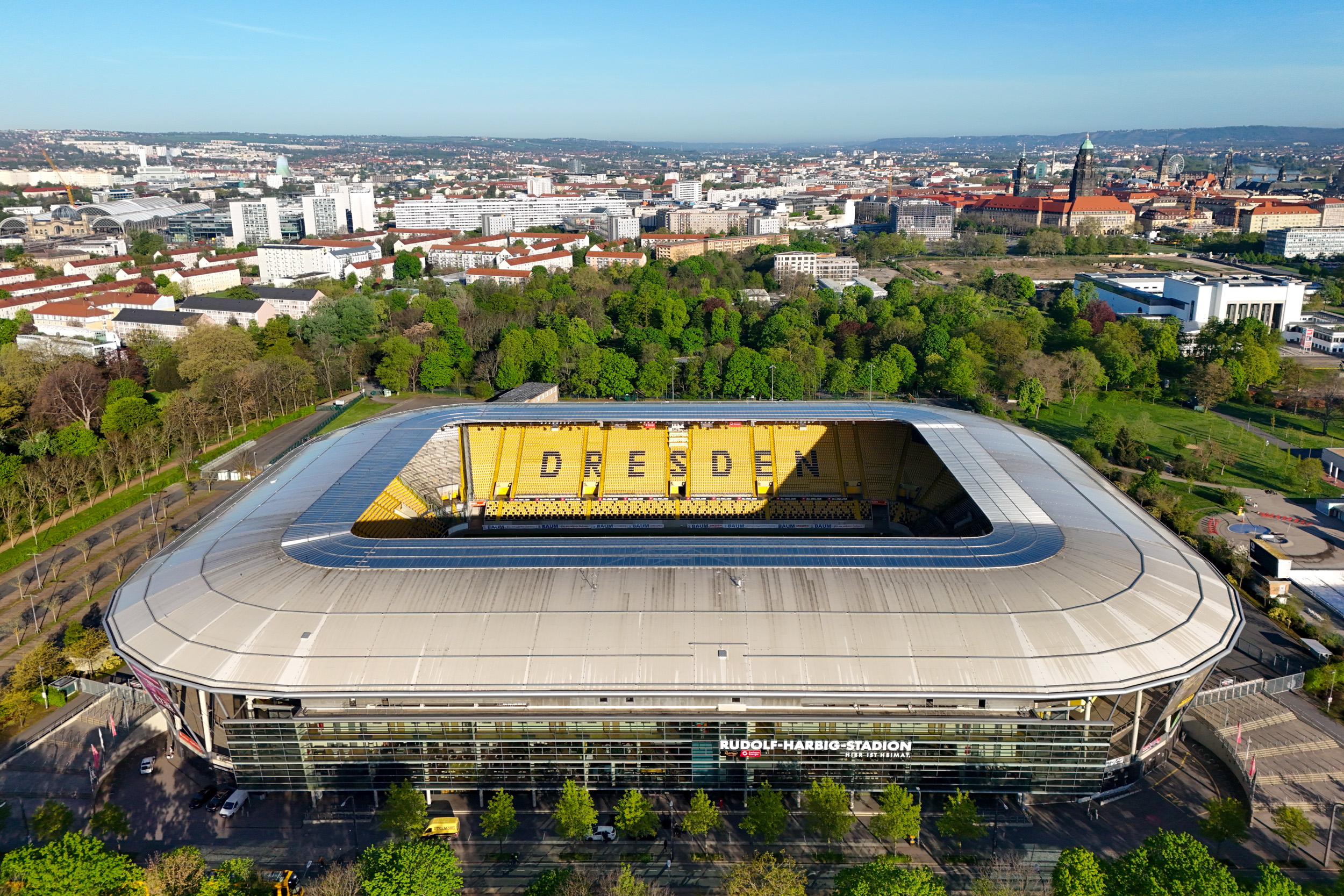
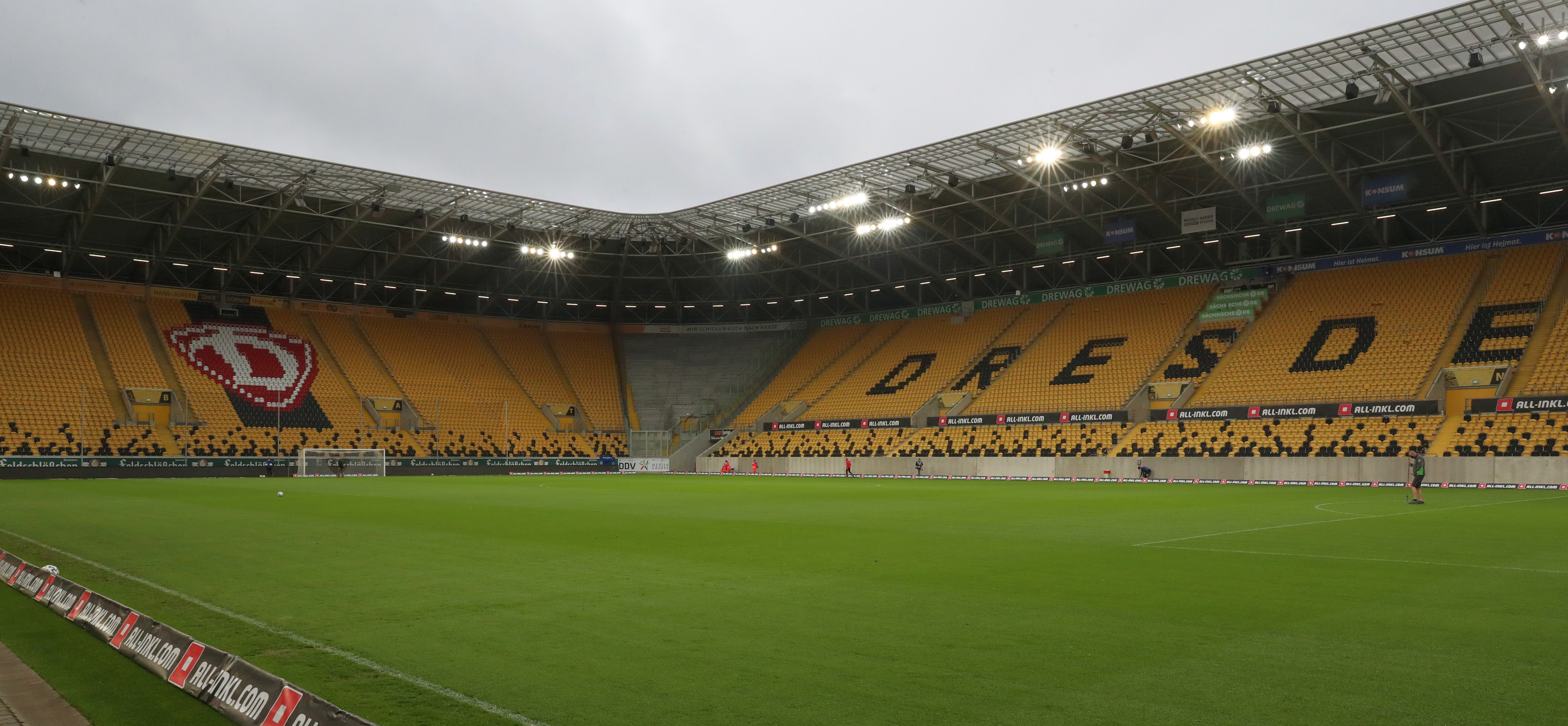
- Interactive map of Rudolf-Harbig-Stadion
- Former names: Sportplatz an der Hygieneausstellung (1911); Dresdner Kampfbahn (1923–1937); Ilgen-Kampfbahn (1937–1945); Rudolf-Harbig-Stadion (1951–1971); Dynamo-Stadion (1971–1990); Rudolf-Harbig-Stadion (1990–2010); Glücksgas-Stadion (2010–2014); Stadion Dresden (2014–2016); DDV-Stadion (2016–2018); Rudolf-Harbig-Stadion Dresden (since 2018)
- Location: Dresden, Germany
- Owner: City of Dresden
- Operator: Stadion Dresden Projektgesellschaft mbH & Co KG
- Capacity: 32,249 (27,000 International Matches)
- Executive suites: Boxes 18; VIP 1366; Business Club 1 Promenade 1
- Surface: Grass
- Record attendance: 38,000 (Dynamo Dresden – BFC Dynamo, 19 March 1983)
- Field size: 105m x 68m (7140m^{2})

Construction
- Built: 1922 to 1923
- Opened: 16 May 1923; 103 years ago
- Renovated: 1951, 1990 and 2009
- Closed: 1944–1951
- Cost: 1923: RM 500,000; 2009: € 45,000,000
- Architects: Hermann Ilgen (1922–1923); Günter Schöneberg & Manfred Mortensen (1969) b+p Projekt (2007–2009)

Tenants
- Dynamo Dresden (1953–present); Germany national football team (selected matches)

Rudolf-Harbig-Stadion is a stadium in Dresden, Saxony, Germany. It is named after athlete Rudolf Harbig and is the current home of Dynamo Dresden. It also hosts fixtures of the German national team on an irregular basis since 1911. Sports facilities have existed on the site of the stadium, the Güntzwiesen, since 1874.

== History ==
=== Beginnings ===
Hermann Ilgen (1856–1940)

The postal card of Ilgenkampfbahn, 1923

The land on which the stadium sits today formed part of what was then called the English district of Dresden, an affluent area home to the city's bourgeoisie and nobility. For more than 110 years, the venue included a flat velodrome, tennis, cricket and finally a footbalal pitch. In the 1870s, during the administration of the park by the "Verein für Volkssport Dresden", the newly established Dresden English Football Club (D.E.F.C.) began playing its first matches in the area. D.E.F.C. were Germany's first football club, arguably the first football club established outside of Great Britain, and thus likely making the area the first in which Cambridge rules football was played in Germany, meaning the park is of great significance to German football. here starts on the same known ground for competitors which flung the leather ball into the net, "With naked legs!". Until 10 March 1894, a game was never lost (during 20 years record period), without somebody not conceding a goal. Some of the first soccer players were: Beb (Captain), Burchard, Graham, Crossley, Spencer, Atkins, Ravenscraft, Johnson, Le Maistre, Luxmoore and Young. The president of the club and venue was the Anglican Rev. Bowden. He came from the neighborhood and later by Socialist Unity Party of Germany's blasted All Saints Church. In addition here was the fathoming of the youth football, what it takes to turn into – invincible versus other clubs. In 1883, the venue at "Güntzwiesen" was in first time recorded in public interests of organized gymnastics federations. In 1885 the VI. German Gymnastics Festival (transl.: Deutsches Turnfest) took place, with 20,000 participants and 270,000 marching athletes from the today known Deutscher Turnerbund. Later in 1896, the city of Dresden has been purchased additional surrounded land to setting it up into a proportional manner of living standards. The ground of this constructed stadium was a part of about 8 courts, which every citizen of Dresden could use for free. The surface spread over 70,000 m^{2}. So far the complete area has been well-kept by gardeners. Every few years the area has been advanced in small ways. For a long time the Georg-Arnold-Bath has been an unknown part of the stadium. A 5m diving platform with extra 60m stands for swimming competitions existed. It was to be demolished in World War II again. Costs conducting oneself for all about 36,000 RM, to the extent of stronger money value. The new successor was the Dresdensia FC.

Before creation of tribunes, would it come nearly for a time of big fountains, but still when the German Empire was defeated in World War I and the town hall had only liabilities, because of paying reparations. So it came the time of the noble donator, by an agent. He would be a patron of the new stadium. On 21 December 1922, workers laid the foundation stone. A quarter year later, the modern, up-to-date stadium had more than 24,000 admissions, including 300 seats and sheltered places. In opposite of the VIP today. The suites have been located towards the south side, before including a field for parades of the inside through the north side. Completed on 16 June 1923, a stadium in total amount of 500,000 German reichsmarks allocated for the expansion to Ilgen-Kampfbahn centrally located at inner city. As recently as 1937, it had been named after the Freemason, Saxon royalist and inventor of the rat poison: Friedrich Hermann Ilgen (1856–1940), before the English and Americans went to other ways. After everything else exists a spoken opening poem by himself for the youth: The following provides the lyrics of the "Ilgen address" as written by himself. Only one verse is currently known at the archive of the city of Dresden rather entry of the former main entry nearly Hygienemuseum:

German	English
Poem of the Ilgen Kampfbahn
Durch opferwill'gen Bürgers Sinn geschaffen Als deutsches Volk in tiefer Not rang um sein Dasein. Sei eine Stätte freud'gen Kampfs der Jugend, Auf der ein neu und frei Geschlecht erstarke, Das Vorwärts drängt zu neuem Leben.	By sacrificing bourgeois sense created As The German nation in deep trouble for its presence, Be a site of joyful competition by our youth, That will be strengthened a new and free generation, Which is urging forward to new vitality.

Three years later (1926), the Georg-Arnhold-Bad was opened, named after Londoner, New Yorker stockbroker and Jewish industry banker Georg Arnhold, who gave 250,000 Reichsmark.

=== Third Reich ===
Since the Nazis took power over Germany, a competition of Nazi architecture builders such as Wilhelm Kreis (architect of the Monument to the Battle of the Nations) and Paul Wolf was breaking out. Both want to create a new world imperial "Saxon Gauforum" of Dresden. So completed buildings are only the Imperial Ministry for Food and Agrarian Economics of Gau Saxony, German Air Force Academy Dresden-Klotzsche, Carusufer and Königsufer, Knabenberufschule, Autobahn Bridge, Dresden German Air Force Command (Dresden) and the Hygiene Museum, handily in the city center. The main part should turn into a with 40,000 seats equipped Saxon Hall, in ensemble for the Adolf Hitler square in front, due to the fact that the stadium has been also created for troops parades of the Saxon Reichswehr until World War I, before. If the complex would have ever finished, main segments of the forum had get chiefly the management houses of the NSDAP, the German Hygiene Museum, Hall and the Bell Tower. It would outclass the baroque part of Dresden, if ever finished, but this was underlined as mad. Also the sense was to give propaganda for make war for citizens of Dresden, they had to imagine the triumphatic symbol for a heroic future. Models in instance were the Gauforum in Weimar, Frankfurt Oder, Augsburg, Hanover and Bochum and in future it should stand in every Gau of the Third Reich. The style corresponded to Bauhaus – neoclassicism with monumental dimensions in order. The first three positions of 277 of elaborated designs were won Western Germans, but they lose the architecture competition because of none presently membership of the Ministry of Public Enlightenment and Propaganda. Prof. Wilhelm Kreis was following and advised personal of Adolf Hitler. The canceled winners were:

- 1. Pos.: A. M. Schmidt (Stuttgart)
- 2. Pos.: H. A. Schaefer (Berlin)
- Purchase:(1) Hans Heuser and Helmut Hentrich (Düsseldorf)
- (2) Leiterer & Wünsche
- (3) Richard Steidle (München)
- (4) Hans Richter (Dresden)
- G. Zielger (Kaiserslautern)
- H. Freese (Dresden)
- Hans Hopp (East Prussia)

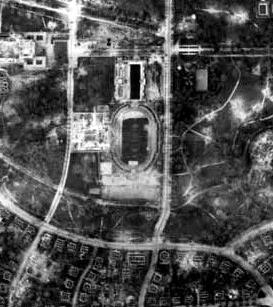
The bombed stadium in 1945.

Centre should be a parade square in measures of 75,000m², in favor of 120,000 peoples stage-managing.

The Gauhaus (210 x 190 m) as well as Sachsenhalle (140 x 220 m) should both on the whole surround 80,000 seats, of militarised fellowship for celebration enslavemented poor peoples. In normal, contemporary ideas of those German guide: "... in der klaren, geraden und wuchtigen Architektur, die der Ausdruck unserer Zeit und unseres Lebensgefühls ist.". (transl.: ... in clearly straight line and shattering architecture, which is the expression of our time and our livestyle.) The suggestion of the area made Prof. Paul Wolf (Building mayor of Dresden). The area had stabile ground and was undeveloped. City mayor Ernst Zörner and Paul Wolf proposed for the institute for eugenics and German Society for Racial Hygiene. Before the roadworks closed down, has been started the Invasion of Poland and thereby joined arms production. The occasion in another contemplation is the fulfillment of the dictators promise to create jobs and decrease a high number of unemployed human resources. After the law of new conception of German towns ("Gesetz zur Neugestaltung deutscher Städte"). Martin Hammitzsch has overtaken the new department for implementations in construction relations named "Durchführungsstelle". Hitler's Brother-in-law, secretary of the Interior of Reichsgau Saxony with master of Construction Worker School Dresden, 1940. He builds the tobacco mosque Yenidze of Dresden, in 1907–09. Born in 1878 – suicide: 1945, the project Gauforum was failed. In 1939, however the groundbreaking completed for the hall. From 1933 to 1945 the stadium was in use of Nazi organisations mainly National Socialist League of the Reich for Physical Exercise, Hitler Youth, League of German Maidens, military organisations like Wehrmacht, SA and SS, which is taboo and also not reclaimed until today. On Dresden Bombing, the meeting hall and traverses with the pool at the oval were dropped full of bombs by Royal Air Force and US Air Force. On renovation, the workers found an explosive bomb directly located under bench and players entry. A bomb defuser worked successfully one an hour before. Before the bombing, two battalions of the People's assault Dresden met here for her swearing, on 5 November 1944, at 9 o'clock in the morning, with men aged 16 to 60 years. The reason was simply the assault by the Soviet 1st Guards Tank Army with 13th Guards Rifle Division. Otto Dix, an artist from the Dresden Academy of Fine Arts served from time to time in there, but he went into the West and was captured of the Armée de terre, notwithstanding that his work was degenerate art for Nazis and he received a labor ban. The poem by Ilgen and sobriquet Kampfbahn (fighting drome) obtaining complemental so for new bloody definitions of war.

=== East Germany ===
In 1953, the Sportvereinigung Dynamo took over the stadium. It bore Rudolf Harbig's name on 23 September. Three years later, the pitch was re-sodded.

On 1 October 1966, a new stand was built. The stadium hosted a match between Dynamo and Rangers F.C. the following year.

In 1971, the stadium was renamed "Dynamo-Stadion" and on 15 September of that same year, it welcomed another stand on the west side, raising its capacity to 36,000, which was further increased to 38,500 in 1980.

=== Into the 21st century ===
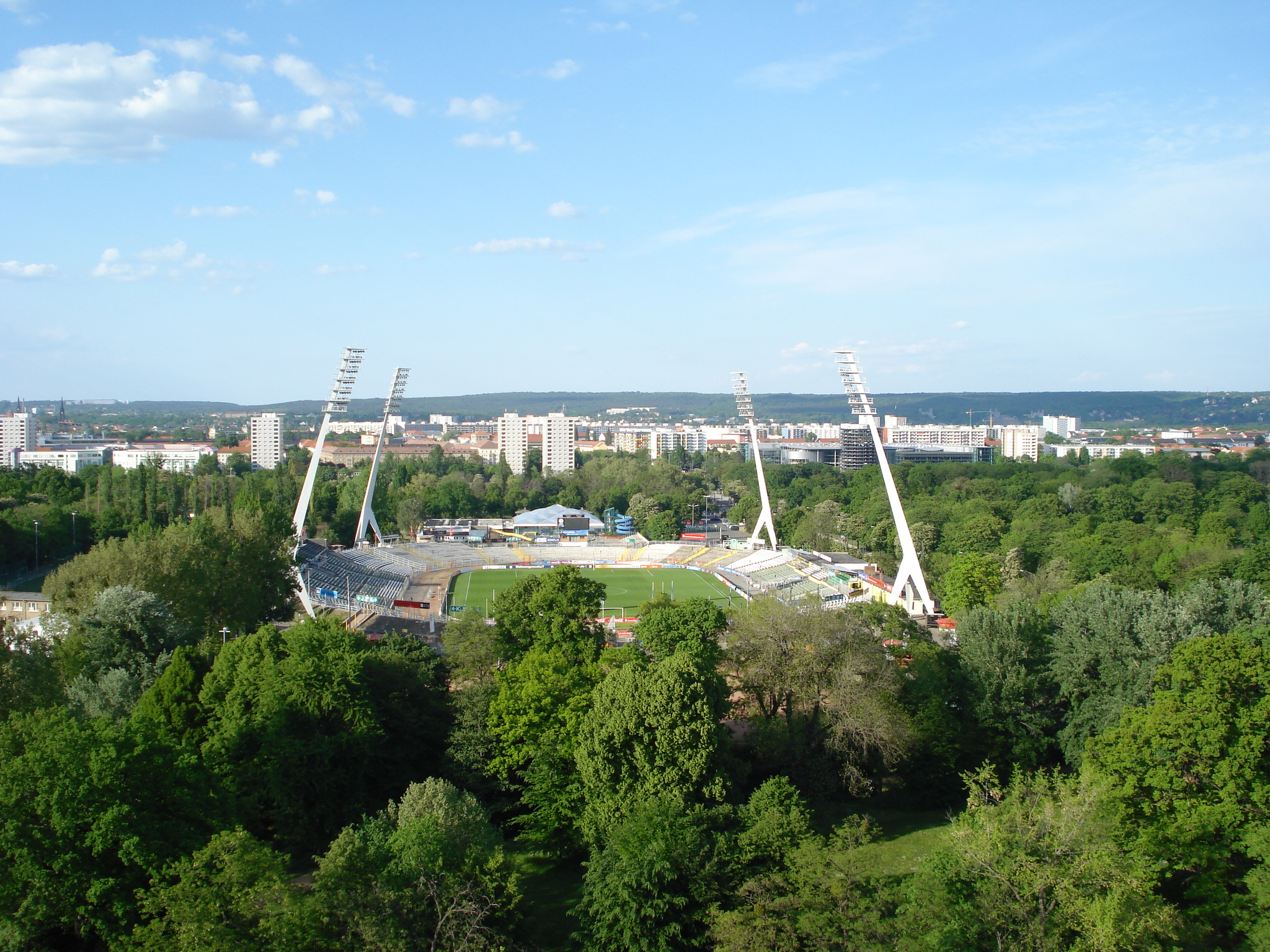
The stadium in 2007, before the 2009 renovation

In 1992, the stadium, under the control of the city of Dresden in order to protect the site should Dynamo Dresden ever face financial problems, was given a DM 375,000 renovation package, raising it to international standards. On 9 May 2007, German sports magazine kicker reported that an agreement has been reached with the city to finance another complete renovation of the stadium by 2009. The stadium in its new form, with 32,400 seats, was opened on 15 September 2009. A sold-out friendly match against FC Schalke 04, which Dynamo lost 1–2, was played for this occasion.

In December 2010, the stadium's naming rights were sold for 5 years to Bavaria-based energy company Goldgas under its Glücksgas brandname.

=== 2011 Women's World Cup ===
On 30 September 2008, it was announced that Dresden had been chosen to be a host city for the 2011 FIFA Women's World Cup. For this reason, the stadium underwent a complete rebuild. The ceremonial "first kickoff" in the newly-rebuilt stadium was taken by the director of the German organizing committee for the World Cup, Steffi Jones.

The director of the local Dresden organizing committee for the World Cup was Klaus Reichenbach, then president of the Saxony Football Federation (Sächsischer Fußball-Verband, SFV).

== State cup and international matches ==
=== National FDGB-Cup finals ===
Date	Local time	Home	Final score (halftime score)	Visitor	Game type	Attendance
31 May 1969	15:00	1. FCM	4:0 (1:0) Goals scored: Jörg Ohm (FCM) 28', Joachim Walter (FCM) 51', Jörg Ohm (FCM) 60', Jürgen Sparwasser (FCM) 68' – Television: Deutscher Fernsehfunk	FCK	FDGB-Cup- finals – Referee: Hans-Joachim Schulz (Görlitz)	20,000
15 June 1970	15:00	Vorwärts Berlin	4:2 (2:0) Goals scored: Begerad (Vorwärts) 4', H. Wruck (Vorwärts) 15', Gießner 52' (Lok, own goal), Löwe (Lok) 62', Köditz (Lok) 67', Nöldner (Vorwärts) 82' – Television: Deutscher Fernsehfunk	Lok Leipzig	FDGB-Cup- finals – Referee: Gerhard Kunze (FC Karl-Marx-Stadt)	22,000

=== 2010 FIFA U-20 Women's World Cup ===
Date	Local time	Home	Final score (halftime score)	Visitor	Game type	Attendance
14 July 2010	15:00	Switzerland	0:4 (0:2) Goals scored: Ji So-yun (KOR) 34', Lee Hyun-young (KOR) 42', Ji So-yun (KOR) 52', Ji So-yun (KOR) 64' – Television: Eurosport, FIFA	South Korea	2010 FIFA U-20 Women's World Cup Group D – Referee: Silvia Reyes (PER)	9,430
14 July 2010	18:00	United States	1:1 (0:1) Goals scored: Elizabeth Cudjoe (GHA) 7', Sydney Leroux (USA) 70' – Television: Eurosport, FIFA	Ghana	2010 FIFA U-20 Women's World Cup Group D – Referee: Dagmar Damková (CZE)	9,430
17 July 2010	15:00	Ghana	2:4 (1:1) Goals scored: Deborah Afriyie (GHA) 28', Ji So-yun (KOR) 41', Elizabeth Cudjoe (GHA) 56', Kim Na-rae (KOR) 62', Kim Jin-young (KOR) 70', Ji So-yun (KOR) 87' – Television: Eurosport, FIFA	South Korea	2010 FIFA U-20 Women's World Cup Group D – Referee: Christina Pedersen (NOR)	17,234
17 July 2010	18:00	United States	5:0 (3:0) Goals scored: Kristie Mewis (USA) 4', Sydney Leroux (USA) 23', Zakiya Bywaters (USA) 25', Sydney Leroux (USA) 52', Sydney Leroux (USA) 76' – Television: Eurosport, FIFA	Switzerland	2010 FIFA U-20 Women's World Cup Group D – Referee: Etsuko Fukano (JPN)	17,234
20 July 2010	11:30	Costa Rica	0:3 (0:2) Goals scored: Daniela Montoya (COL) 24', Daniela Montoya (COL) 40', Yorely Rincon (COL) 90'+3 (penalty) – Television: Eurosport, FIFA	Colombia	2010 FIFA U-20 Women's World Cup Group A – Referee: Cristina Dorcioman (ROU)	12,863
20 July 2010	14:30	New Zealand	1:4 (0:1) Goals scored: Ludmila (BRA) 25', Leah (BRA) 59', Debora (BRA) 87', Rosie White (NZL) 89', Debora (BRA) 90' – Television: Eurosport, FIFA	Brazil	2010 FIFA U-20 Women's World Cup Group B – Referee: Dagmar Damková (CZE)	12,863
25 July 2010	18:30	Mexico	1:3 (0:2) Goals scored: Lee Hyun-young (KOR) 14', Ji So-yun (KOR) 28', Lee Hyun-young (KOR) 67', Natalia Gomez Junco (MEX) 83' – Television: Eurosport, FIFA	South Korea	2010 FIFA U-20 Women's World Cup Quarterfinals – Referee: Dagmar Damková (CZE)	21,146

=== 2011 FIFA Women's World Cup ===
Date	Local time	Home	Final score (halftime score)	Visitor	Game type	Attendance
28 June 2011	18:15	United States	2:0 (0:0) Goals scored:Cheney (USA) 54', Buehler (USA) 76': – Television:ESPN (USA)	North Korea	2011 FIFA Women's World Cup Group C – Referee:Bibiana Steinhaus (GER)	21,859
1 July 2011	18:15	New Zealand	1:2 (1:0) Goals scored: Gregorius (NZL) 18', Scott (ENG) 63', Clarke (ENG) 81' – Television:ESPN (USA)	England	2011 FIFA Women's World Cup Group B– Referee: Therese Neguel (CMR)	19,110
5 July 2011	20:45	Canada	0:1 (0:0) Goals scored: Nkwocha (NGA) 73' – Television: ESPN (USA)	Nigeria	2011 FIFA Women's World Cup Group A – Referee: Finau Vulivuli (FIJ)	13,638
10 July 2011	17:30	Brazil	2:2 a.e.t. (3:5 PSO) (0:1) Goals scored: Daiane (BRA) 2' OG, Marta (BRA) 68'(Pen), 92', Wambach (USA) 120'+2 – Television: ESPN(USA)	United States	2011 FIFA Women's World Cup quarterfinals – Referee:Jacqui Melksham (AUS)	25,598

=== Other international football matches ===
Date	Local time	Home	Final score (halftime score)	Visitor	Game type	Attendance
9 October 1911	16:00	(German Empire) Germany	1:2 (0:0) Goals scored: Schmieger (AUT) '25, Willi Worpitzky (GER) '35, Neumann (AUT) '49	(Austria-Hungary) Austria	Exhibition game – Referee: Herbert James Willing (NED)	7,500
12 August 1923	16:00	(Weimar Republic) Germany	1:2 (0:0) Goals scored: Henry Müller own goal (GER) 10', Linna (FIN) 27', Walter Claus-Oehler (GER) 31'	Finland	Exhibition game – Referee: Johannes Mutters (NED)	25,000
14 October 1992	18:00	Germany	1:1 (0:0) Goals scored: Rudi Völler (GER) 58', Carlos Hermosillo (MEX) 72' – Television: Das Erste	Mexico	Exhibition game – Referee: Jozef Marko (CZE)	27,000
22 April 2010	18:00	Germany (Women)	*:* (*:*) Cancelled (2010 eruptions of Eyjafjallajökull)	Sweden (Women)	Exhibition game	N/A
15 September 2010	18:00	Germany (Women)	5:0 (1:0) Goals scored: Inka Grings (GER) 2' (penalty), Fatmire Bajramaj (GER) 54', Alexandra Popp (GER) 76', Melanie Behringer (GER) 79', Celia Okoyino da Mbabi (GER) 83' – Television: Das Erste, DFB TV	Canada (Women)	Exhibition game, U-20 World Champion winner ceremony, Birthday of Helmut Schön, Honor for Inka Grings – Referee: Dagmar Damková (CZE)	20,431

== Statistics ==
- Area: 72,000m²
- Stadium: 190m x 150m x 32m (912,000m^{3})
- Playing field: 105m x 68m (7140m^{2})
- Capacity: 32,085
- Distance from top seat: 89m
- Underfloor field heating: 25,000 m small water tube made in elastic plastic -must start 6 days before with 180,000 Euro costs
- Arched roof: 19,400m² (7,500,000 Euro) with 14,600m² Soprema slide
- Concrete: 2500m³ = 333 In-transit mixers

== Media ==
=== Gallery ===
Postcard showing the stadium as it appeared in 1900.

Postcard showing a stadium map from 1922.

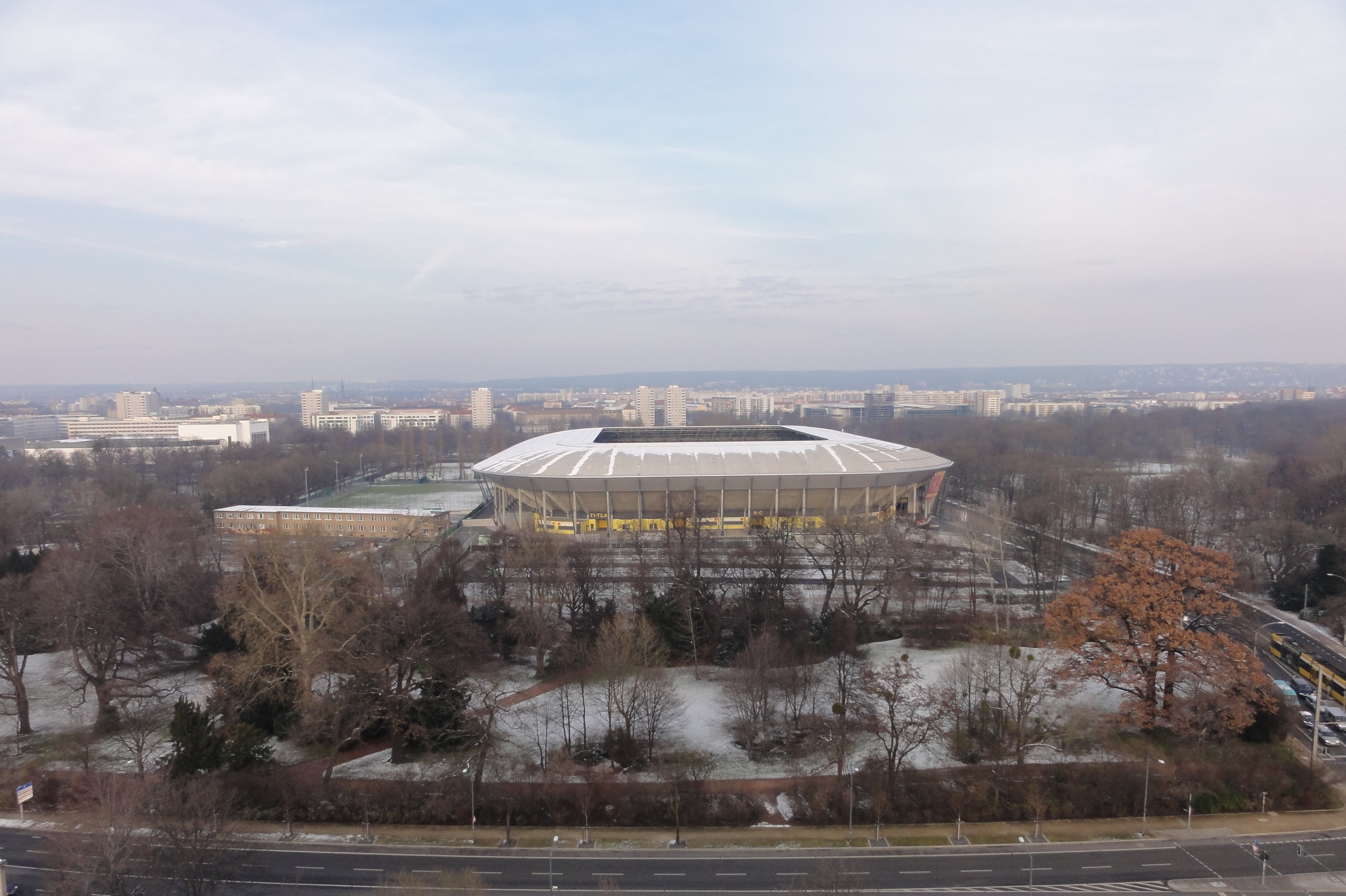
The stadium as it appeared in 2009

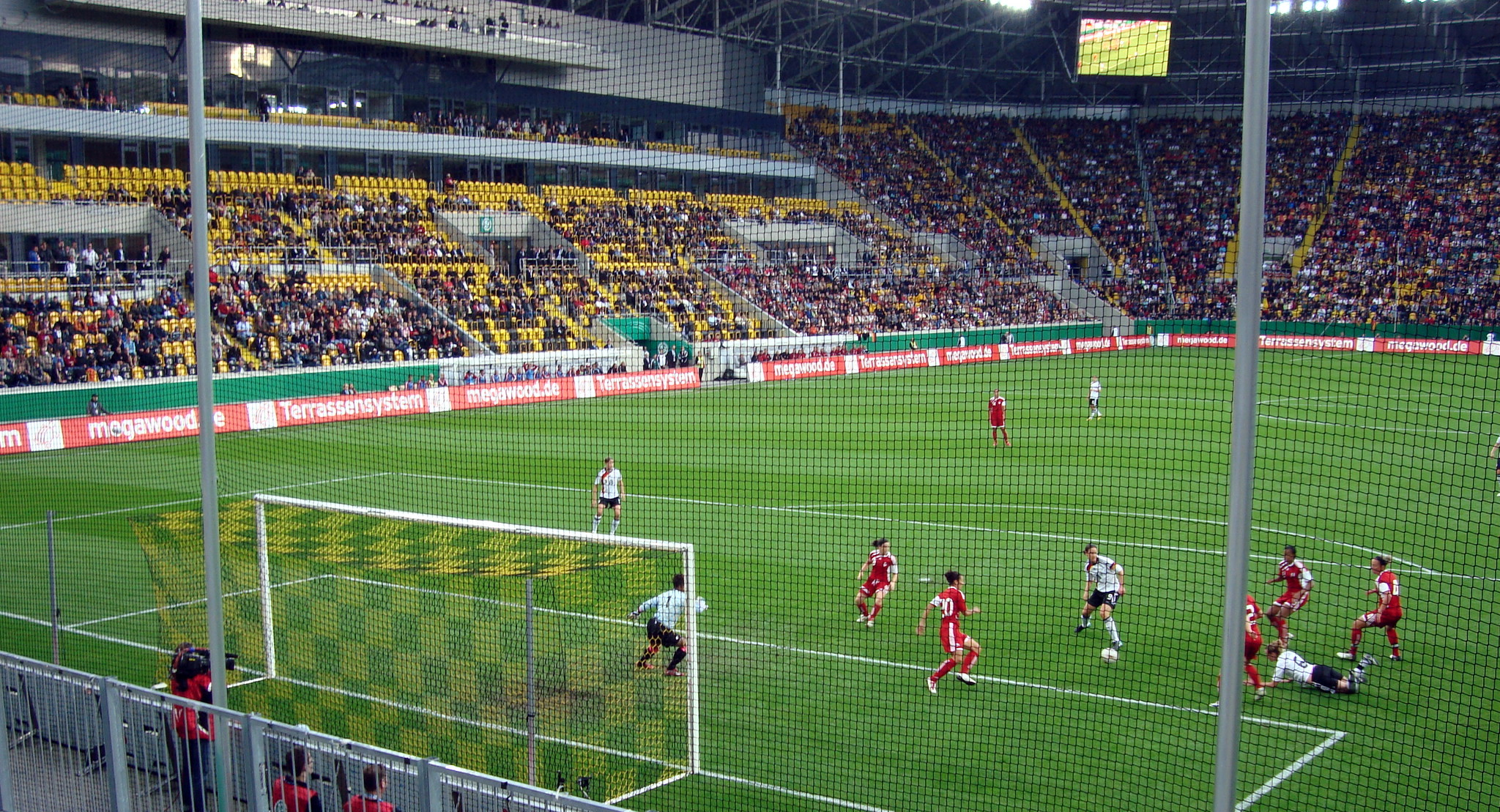
An exhibition game between the German and Canadian women's national teams.

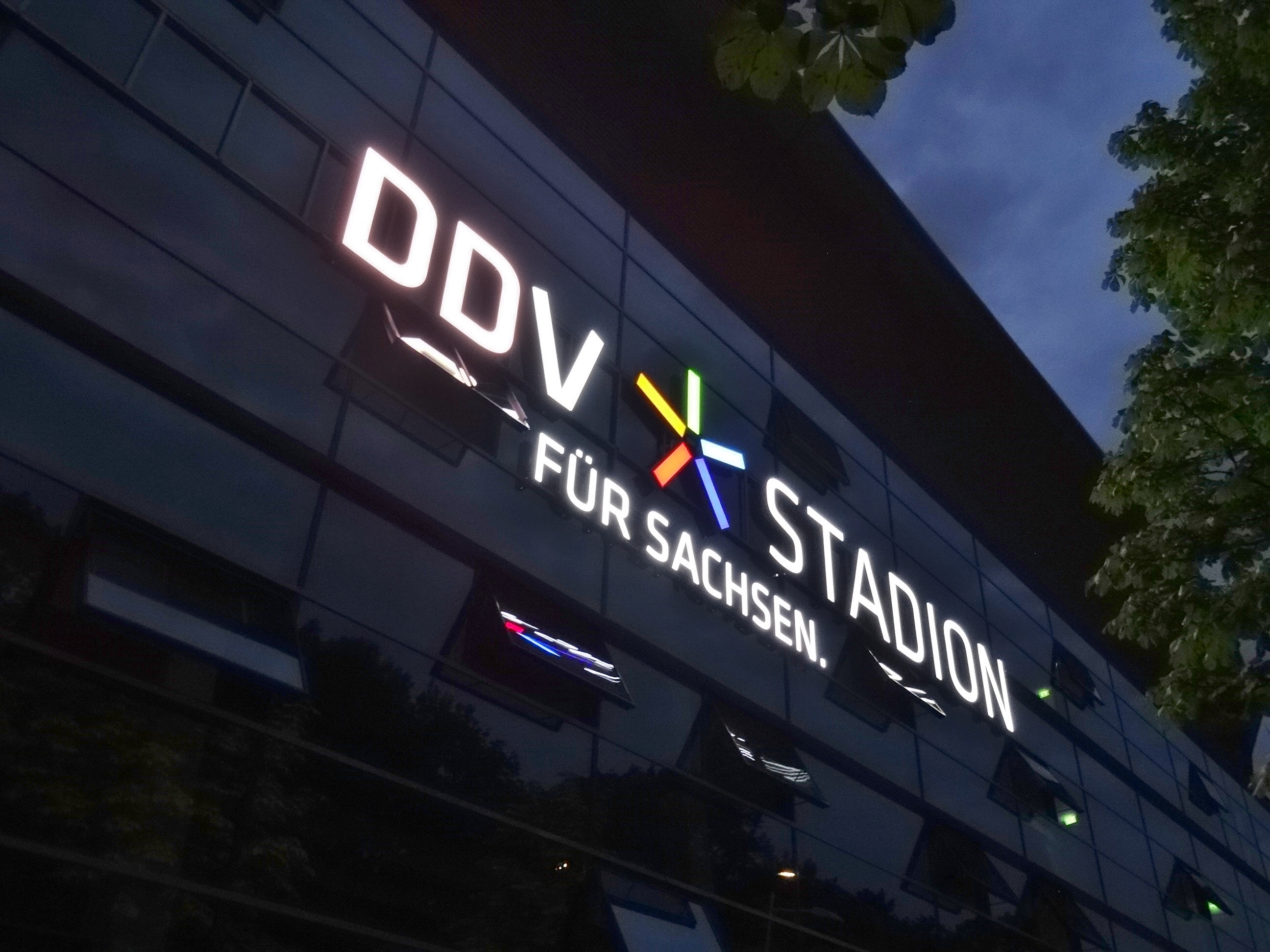
2016: The new name DDV Stadium (by a Dresden Media Group).
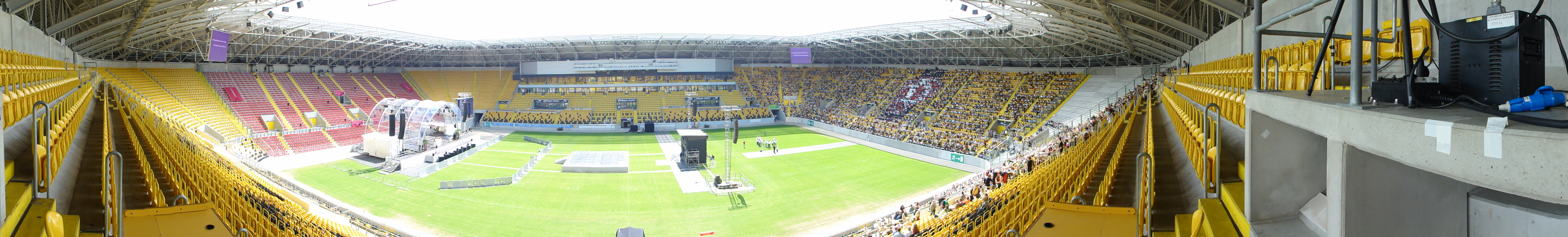
Panorama taken during the rehearsal for the 33rd German Evangelical Church Assembly

=== Literature about ===
- Pockart, Steffen (2010). Das Leuchten der Giraffen: kotte ... cocker ... kaffee-mix (in German). Books on Demand. ISBN 978-3-8391-4367-4.
- Schwarz, Jürgen (2009). Das Dresdner Stadion: Die Geschichte einer legendären Fußballarena (in German). Edition Sächsische Zeitung. ISBN 978-3-938325-67-4.
- Zimmermann, Gert (2009). Das neue Rudolf-Harbig-Stadion: FANtastische Fans und Emotionen pur (in German). ORKA-MEDIA. ISBN 978-3-00-029535-5.
- Wolf, Christiane (1999). Gauforen. Zentren der Macht. Zur nationalsozialistischen Architektur und Stadtplanung (in German). Verlag Bauwesen. ISBN 978-3-345-00694-4.

=== Maps or cards about ===
- Technische Universität Dresden: Map of the Rudolf Harbig Stadium Dresden. – Dresden: Institute for Cartographics, 1997; SLUB OPAC (in German)

== See also ==
- Heinz-Steyer-Stadion
- List of European stadiums by capacity
- List of football stadiums in Germany
- Lists of stadiums
