= Paul Wolff =

Paul Wolff may refer to:

- Paul Wolff (screenwriter), American screenwriter, actor and producer
- Paul Wolff (audio engineer), American electronics engineer and entrepreneur

== See also ==
- Paul Wolf, American swimmer
- Paul Wolf (architect), German architect
- Paul Wolfe, American NASCAR crew chief and driver
