= Emporio (Hamburg) =

- Emporio Hochhaus (German)
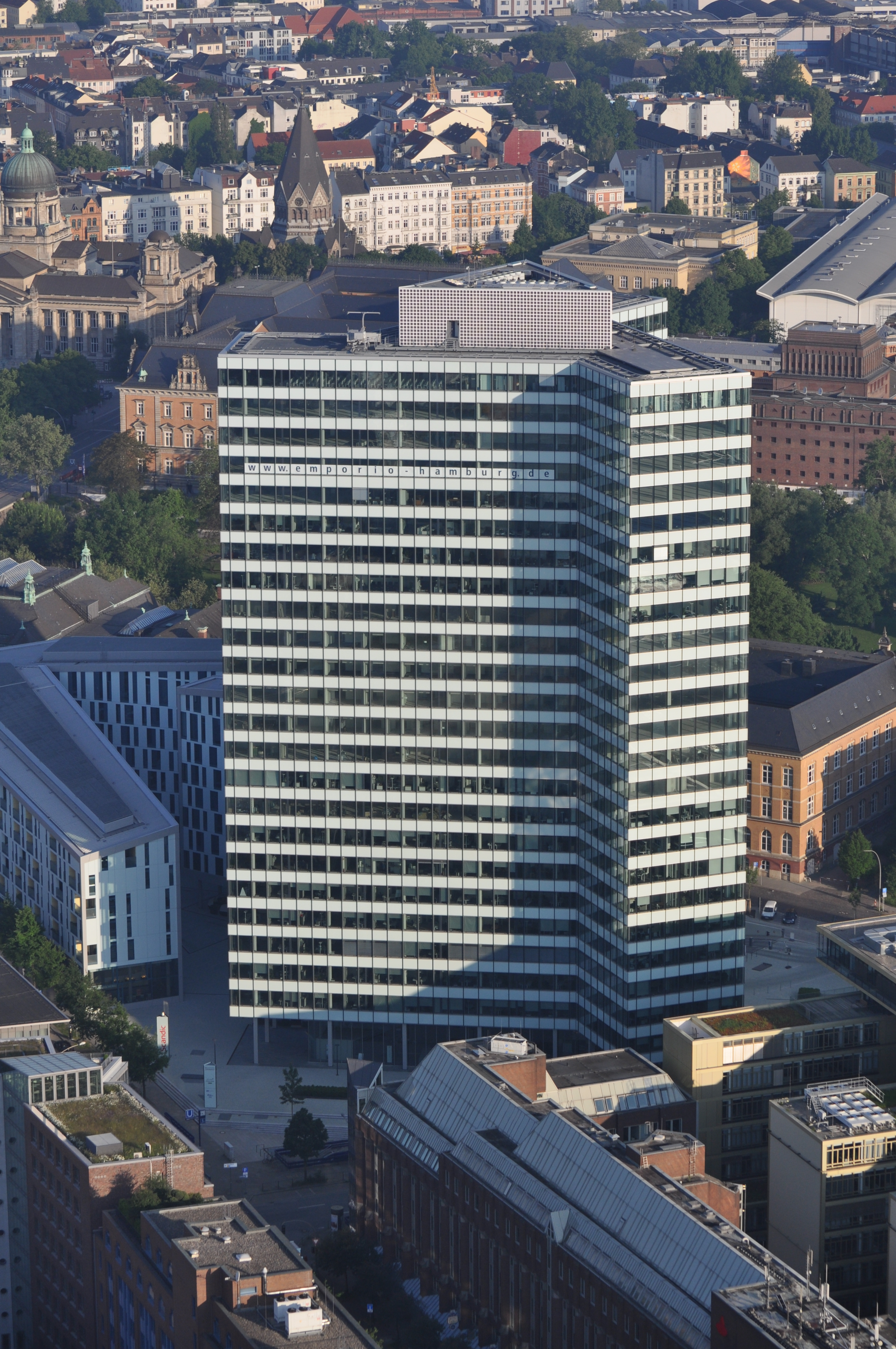
- Interactive map of the Emporio area
- Former names: Unileverhaus

General information
- Type: high-rise
- Location: Dammtorwall 15, Neustadt, Hamburg
- Coordinates: 53°33′21″N 9°59′0″E
- Completed: 1964
- Renovated: 2012

Height
- Height: 98 m (322 ft)

Technical details
- Floor count: 24
- Floor area: 40,000 m^{2} (430,000 sq ft)
- Lifts/elevators: Schindler

Design and construction
- Architects: Hentrich & Petschnigg
- Main contractor: Wayss & Freytag

Renovating team
- Architects: HPP Hentrich, Petschnigg & Partner
- Renovating firm: Hochtief
- Awards and prizes: LEED Platinum

Website
- emporio-hamburg.de

Emporio (formerly: Unileverhaus) is a 98 m high-rise office building in the Neustadt of Hamburg. Originally built in 1964 as headquarters of Deutsche Unilever, when Unilever moved its headquarters to HafenCity in 2009, the tower was sold, renamed, extensively renovated and since marketed to multiple parties.

Emporio was designed by Helmut Hentrich & Hubert Petschnigg of Düsseldorf and had originally 21 floors at a total height of 90 m. The renovation carried out until 2012 included an additional three floors and a number of state-of-the-art technical and ecological modernizations; among others a double glazed façade and low energy consuming HVAC. Part of the redevelopment is a newly built, six-story street-block, rented to Swedish hotel chain Scandic Hotels.

== History ==
=== Architecture ===
The building was designed by the architectural firms Helmut Hentrich and Hubert Petschnigg. The Unilever Building originally consisted of 21 floors and was 90 metres high. The building has a triangular core made of reinforced concrete as a fixed point and access point for elevators. Three panes of glass are arranged tangentially and intersectingly on the three edges of this central triangle. This gives the building its special shape, a rotationally symmetrical geometric figure that does not have its own name. The area attached to the core is a steel skeleton construction with a curtain wall, a lightweight facade. Its interior was largely designed by Eduard Bargheer, who was also responsible for the inlaid wall of the central conference room. What was remarkable about the Unilever Building was the original complete lack of auxiliary structures, allowing the building to have an impact through its presence alone. A cafeteria for 400 people, an underground car park with 280 parking spaces, air conditioning, seven elevators and a paternoster were available.

After the renovation, the building is 98 meters high, divided into 24 floors and has 40,021 square meters of usable space. During the renovation, the facade was gradually replaced with a double facade that took modern energy standards into account. Over 2,700 facade elements weighing 700 kilograms were replaced for this purpose. On the green areas originally created around the building, a new peripheral development was created with a hotel from the Scandinavian chain Scandic with a usable space of 23,800 square meters. The supervision of this new building was carried out by the architectural firm Markovic Ronai Voss (MRLV).

sustainability concept The renovation was intended to improve the ecological balance of the high-rise building by installing energy- and resource-conscious technical building equipment. The aim was to reduce CO 2 emissions from around 2750 tonnes per year to around 1700 tonnes. The annual primary energy requirement per square metre of 158 kWh is expected to correspond to CO 2 emissions of 40 kg/(m²a). The office building is pre-certified for the silver seal of approval from the German Sustainable Building Council and received the American building seal Leadership in Energy and Environmental Design (LEED) in platinum.

=== Planning ===
Planning for the construction of the administrative headquarters for the then Margarine Union began as early as the 1950s. The area between Caffamacherreihe, Dammtorwall, Dragonerstall and Valentinskamp and the streets Fürstenplatz and Ulricusstraße in the Neustadt was one of the last remaining alleyways in Hamburg. Due to the narrow and partly dilapidated buildings, including many half-timbered buildings from the 17th to 19th centuries, it was declared a redevelopment area.

In 1958, 12,000 square meters of the area were sold to Margarine Union for three million DM (8.4 million € in today's purchasing power) to build a prestigious office building that would improve the district. The higher costs for demolishing the buildings and relocating 120 businesses and 2,000 residents (including 600 households in social housing), some of whom were reluctant to leave their district, were borne by the city. In 1958, tests were carried out using a tethered balloon to determine the height of the building and its impact on the cityscape. An architectural competition was announced in the same year. In 1961, another 2,500 square meters of Caffamacherreihe and Valentinskamp were sold to Margarine Union for 1.26 million DM, as the area was too small to create the necessary parking spaces and open green spaces. By 1965, the city had relocated another 75 families and 27 businesses.

=== Construction ===
The construction was carried out by the companies Wayss & Freytag and Walter Bau. Nine months passed between the laying of the foundation stone in October 1961 and the topping-out ceremony in July 1962. In 1964, Margarine-Union moved into the building with 2,100 employees who had previously been housed at 15 locations in the city.

The shape and height of the building were controversial. The central supply tower, which protruded more than 15 meters above the top floor as a black "stump", was considered too prominent. Due to public protests, the building was therefore extended by two floors in 1964, so that only 7.90 meters of the supply tower protruded, which was also clad in light-colored artificial stone panels.

In 1989, DIFA AG, later Union Investment Real Estate GmbH, acquired the building for the open-ended real estate fund UniImmo Deutschland. In 2000, the building was listed as a historical monument as an example of Hamburg's post-war modernization.

=== Renovation ===
Since the building neither met Unilever's space requirements nor the modern demands of an office building, the company and its 1,100 employees moved to a new building on Strandkai in HafenCity in 2009.

Hochtief Construction was commissioned as general contractor to convert the building into the Emporio high-rise, which began in July 2009 and was completed in early 2012. The contract volume stated by the client at the start of construction was 138 million euros. [ 5 ] Hochtief gutted the building, demolished the technical structures, created a new elevator shaft and replaced the underground car park with three basement levels. In autumn 2010, the building was extended by two more floors, bringing the total to 23 floors and a height of 98 metres.

A special feature during the renovation phase was the 106-meter-high crane required to erect the steel structure and install the new facade; it was one of the tallest free-standing construction cranes in Europe.

== Gallery ==
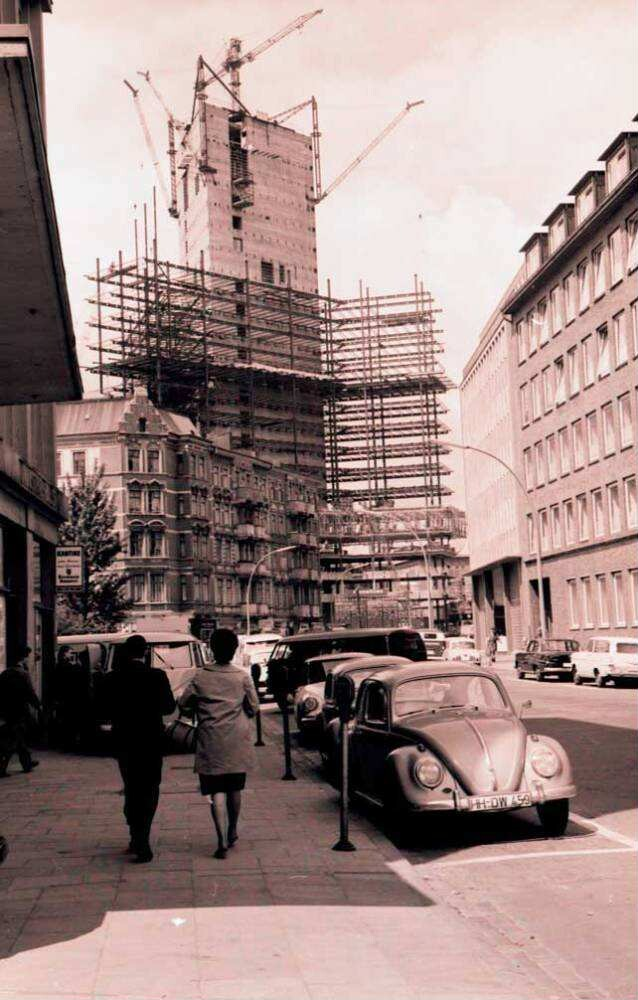
The tower under constructuon in 1962

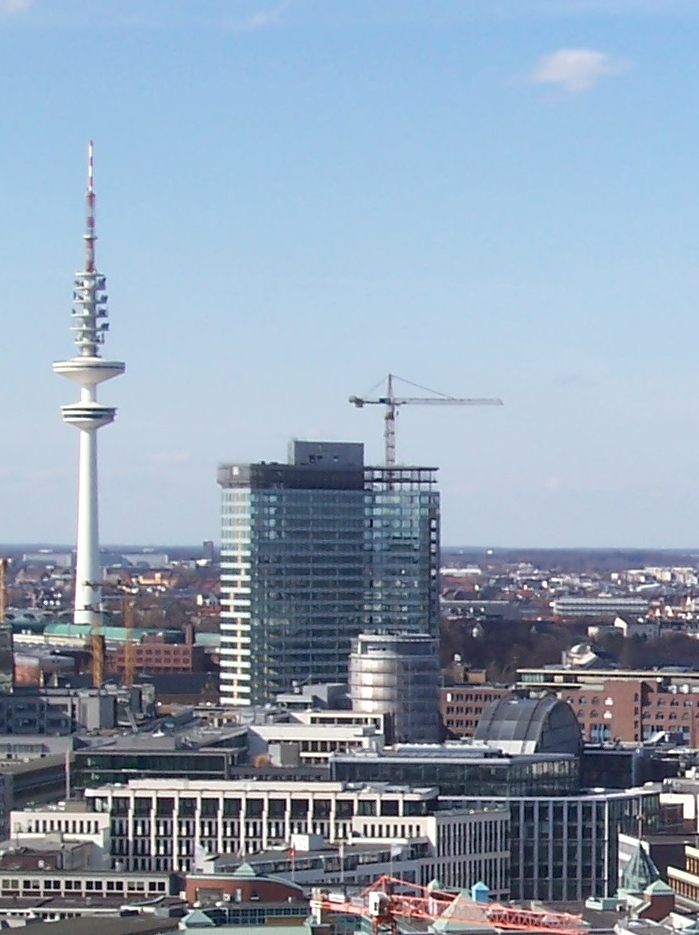
The tower under renovation works in 2010

== See also ==
- List of tallest buildings in Hamburg
- List of tallest buildings in Germany
