= Pyrmont Castle =

Castle in Germany

Coordinates: 50°14′14.81″N 7°17′15.54″E

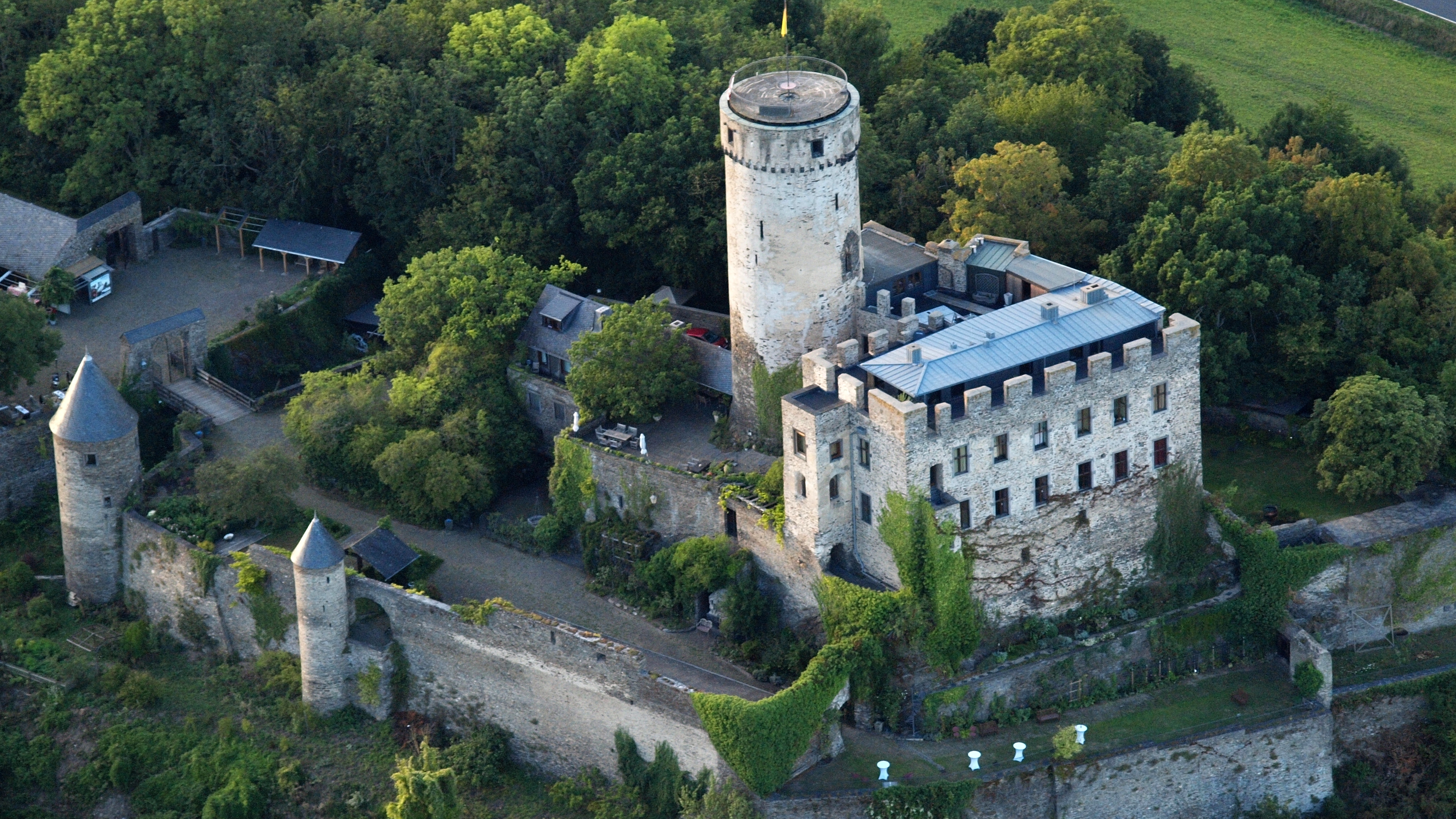
Pyrmont Castle, 2015 aerial photograph

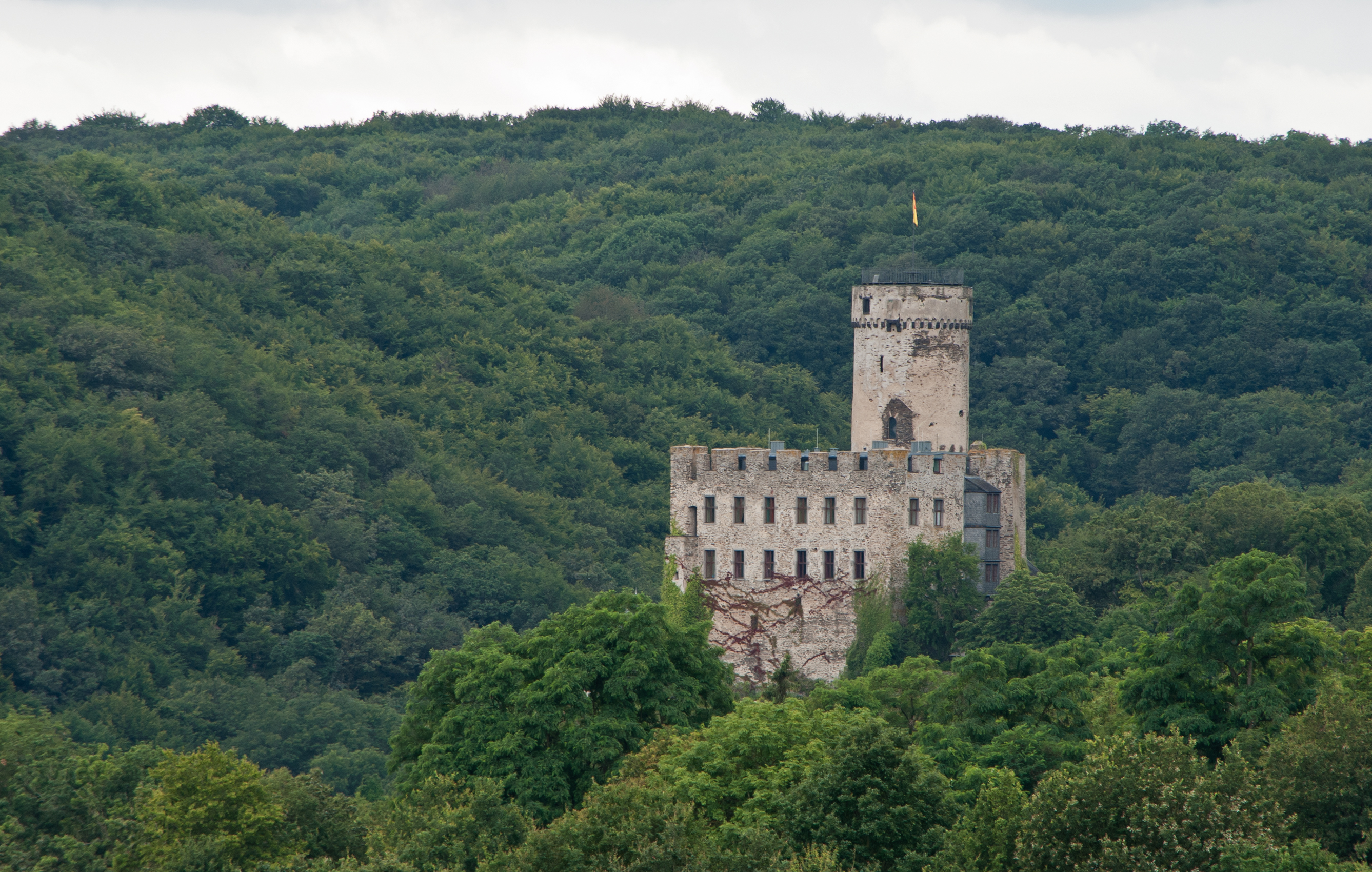
View from Pillig to the east

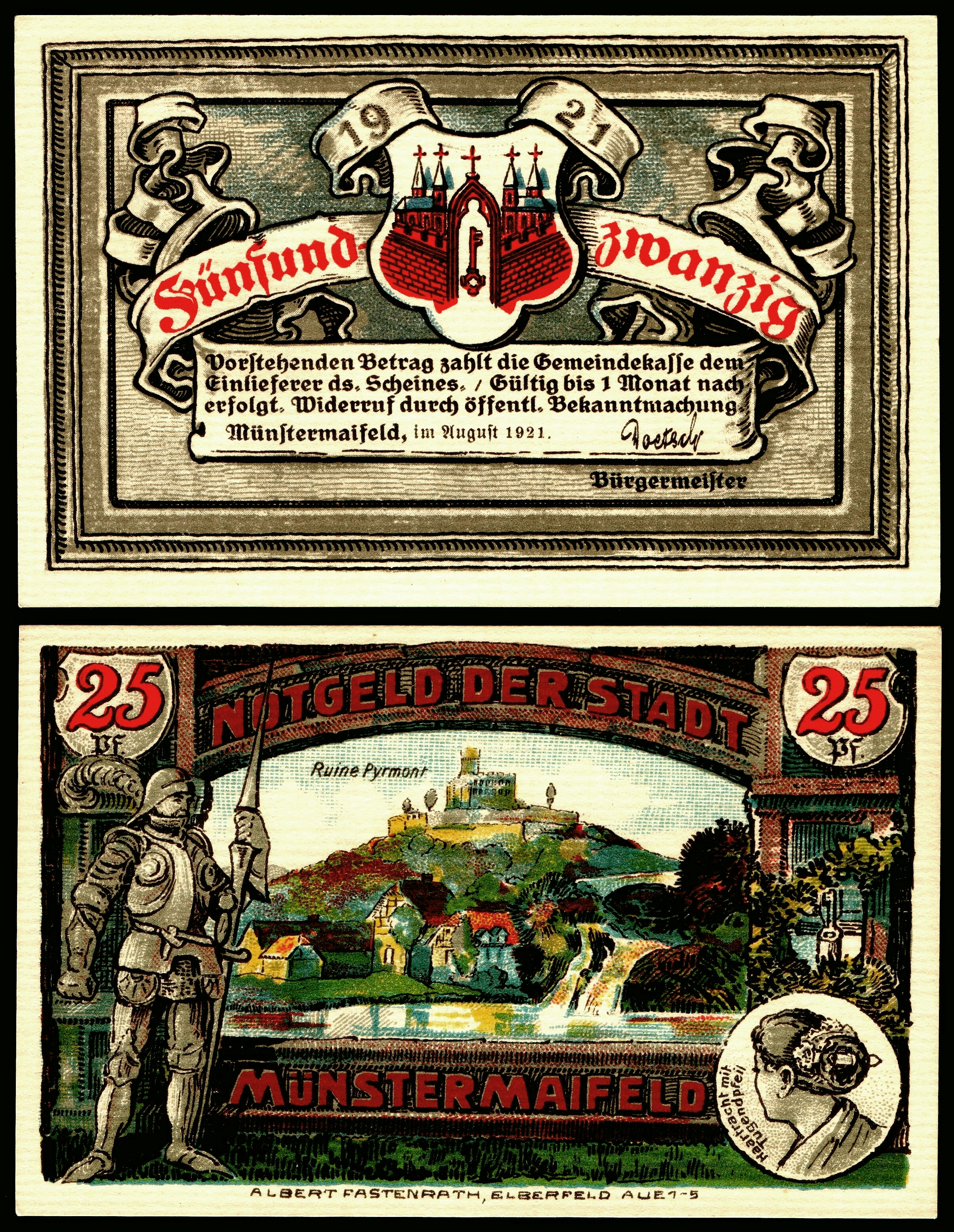
Depiction of the castle on a 1921 Notgeld note

Pyrmont Castle (German: Burg Pyrmont) stands west of Münstermaifeld near Roes and Pillig on a slate rock outcrop above a waterfall on the Elzbach in the southern Eifel mountains in Germany. It is in the municipality of Roes in the district of Cochem-Zell.

== History ==
The rock castle was built at the end of the 12th century on count palatine territory by Cuno of Schönburg, whose son Cuno II called himself "Lord of Pyrmont", the first member of his family to use the title. The castle was first recorded in 1225.

In 1441, Cuno VI of Pyrmont laid down by his will and testament how his inheritance (and thus also Pyrmont Castle) should be divided between his three quarrelsome sons, Henry VI, John and Frederick, in order to protect the ancestral seat of the dynasty from division by inheritance. But this did not prevent the squabblers from fighting over the castle after their father's death. Henry VI of Pyrmont had the Reichsacht imposed on him as a result of the inheritance dispute and the administration of his share of the castle was transferred to his brother Frederick.

The castle did not witness more peaceful times until the second half of the 15th century, when Emperor Maximilian I elevated Henry IV, Lord of Pyrmont, to the status of a Freiherr. Although his marriages resulted in two sons, his daughter, Elisabeth, was eventually to inherit the Pyrmont estate. Since she married Philip of Eltz, the castle fell to this important comital dynasty.

However, even the Eltz family did not always agree on the distribution of their inheritance. In 1652, one of the Eltz heiresses sold her share to members of the family of Waldbott of Bassenheim because of the ongoing disputes who, two years later, were appointed imperial Freiherren thanks to their ownership of this estate.

In 1695, another Eltz share in Pyrmont Castle went to the Electorate of Trier and was also acquired by the Waldbott of Bassenheim family in 1710.

In 1712, the Waldbotts began to convert the medieval castle into a prestigious Schloss. For example, the palas was increased in height to three storeys and fitted with large windows. The present perron, on the south side of the castle, dates to this period.

In 1789, during the French Revolution, the owners fled from French troops to their estates on the right bank of the Rhine, and just five years later the castle was seized as French national property. She suffered the fate of many castle estates west of the Rhine: in 1810, she was auctioned off by the French, with seven hectares of land, for 4,550 francs. Its new owner, Franz Georg Severus Weckbecker from Münstermaifeld, sold everything of any value. The remains of the buildings then gradually deteriorated.

In 1818, Count Friedrich Waldbott von Bassenheim bought back the castle. Under his son, Count Hugo Waldbott, it was forcibly auctioned in 1862. Many owners were to follow him, but none rebuilt the ruins. Only the family of the architect, Franz Krause, who worked as a draughtsman for The Art Monuments of the Rhine Province, made part of the dilapidated castle complex habitable again from 1912 onwards. However, there was a lack of money for further major restoration.

In 1963, two Düsseldorf architects, Helmut Hentrich and Hubert Petschnigg, bought the remnants of Pyrmont Castle. After its purchase, they began with safety work and a gradual reconstruction, especially of the inner bailey. In 1990, the castle grounds were opened to visitors. In the interior rooms, old furniture and furnishings can nowadays be seen, which fill the rooms with history and partly recall the former owners of the castle. In the rebuilt outer bailey is a souvenir shop.

== Description ==
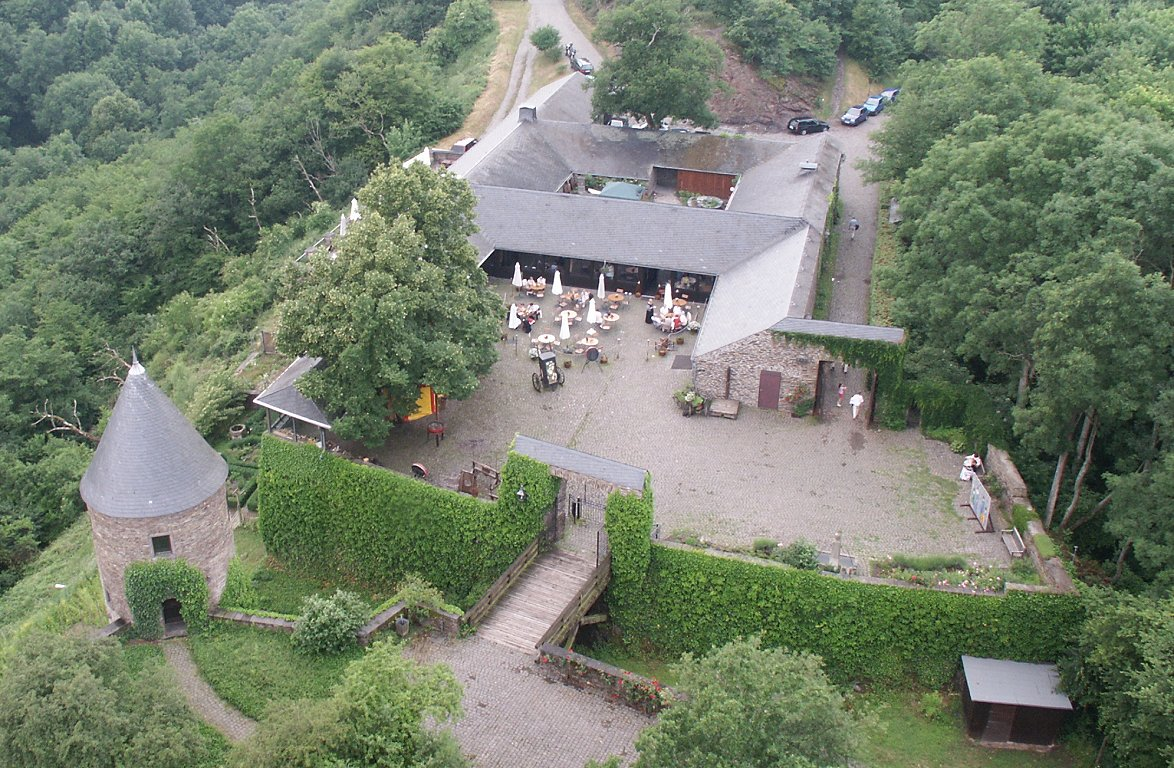
Outer bailey of Pyrmont Castle

The irregular, rectangular castle was built in the typical style of the Staufer period. The 24.5-metre-high round, bergfried is of the donjon type and was the first of its kind in the entire Middle Rhine region. It has two vaults, several fireplaces and can be climbed as an observation tower. It also has a conical roof. In its shadows is a 49-metre-deep castle well (Sodbrunnen).

A 15th-century Zwinger with round towers guards the inner bailey. A deep neck ditch separates the inner bailey and Zwinger from the outer bailey, which has been rebuilt as part of the restoration.

The Zwinger was once occupied by residential and domestic buildings, of which only the large storage cellar (Fuderkeller) has survived. Under the modern administrative building is the old north gate, which was the main entrance until the castle was expanded after the 15th century.

The inner bailey, built on the rocks high above the Zwinger, consists of the formerly three-storeyed palas, the attached cookhouse and the bergfried. When the castle was remodelled in the baroque style from 1712, the palas and cookhouse were given roofs that reached to the top of the bergfried. The facades were standardised in the baroque style with the insertion of new windows. The palas and cookhouse have only been restored with two storeys and a flat roof. The remains of the third storey recall that the castle was a ruin for a long time.

The ground floor of the palas has an entrance hall, the great hall (Rittersaal) and smaller rooms; the remains of the castle chapel adjoin it. On the ground floor of the cookhouse, a kitchen has been built to the same dimensions as the historical one.

The 18th-century castle garden, which was clearly never finished, lies below the castle, supported by dry stone walls and containing a fish pond. On the south and west hillside are traces of the vineyards which were cultivated until the 18th century.

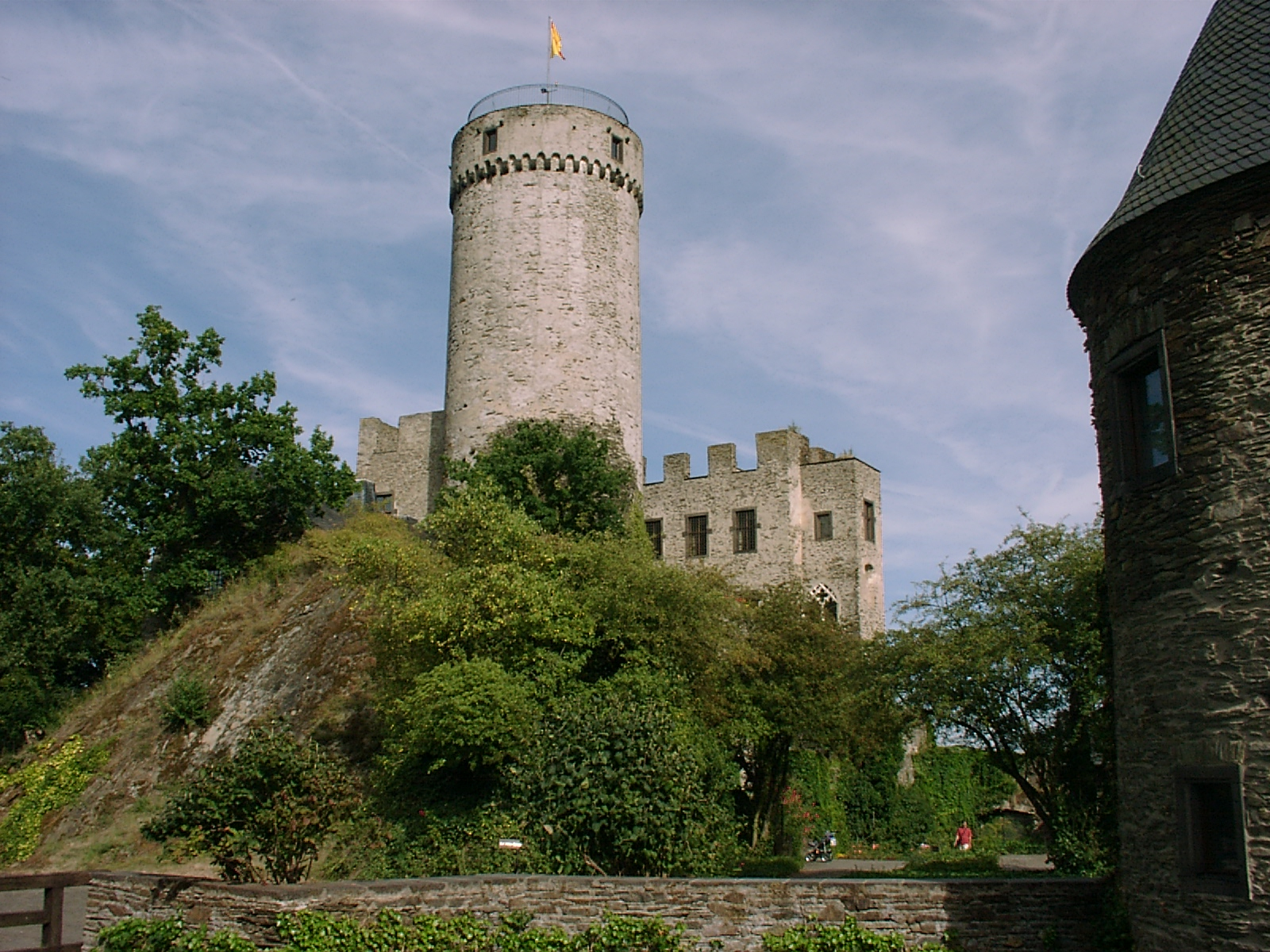
View from the west

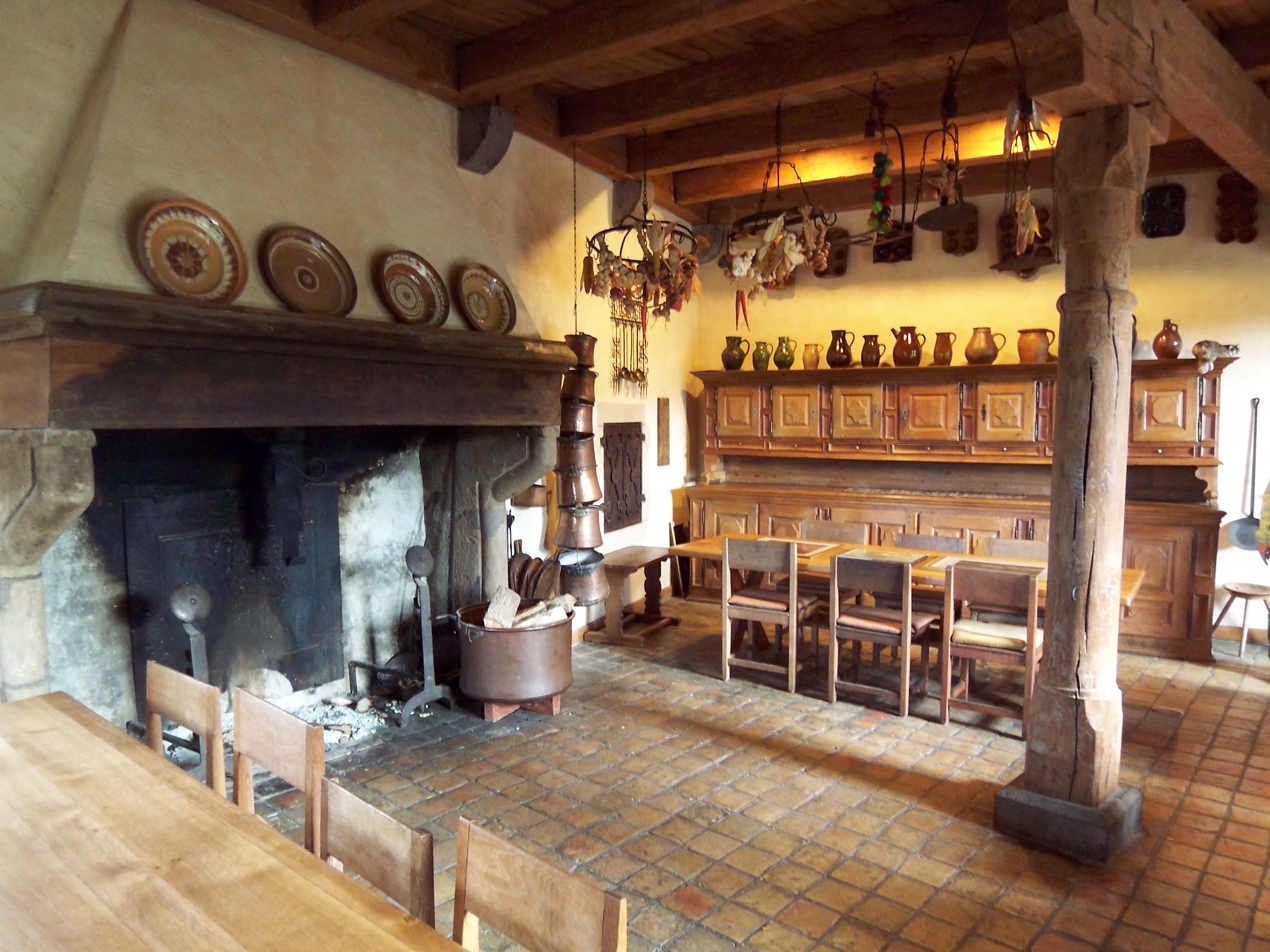
Interior view: cookhouse

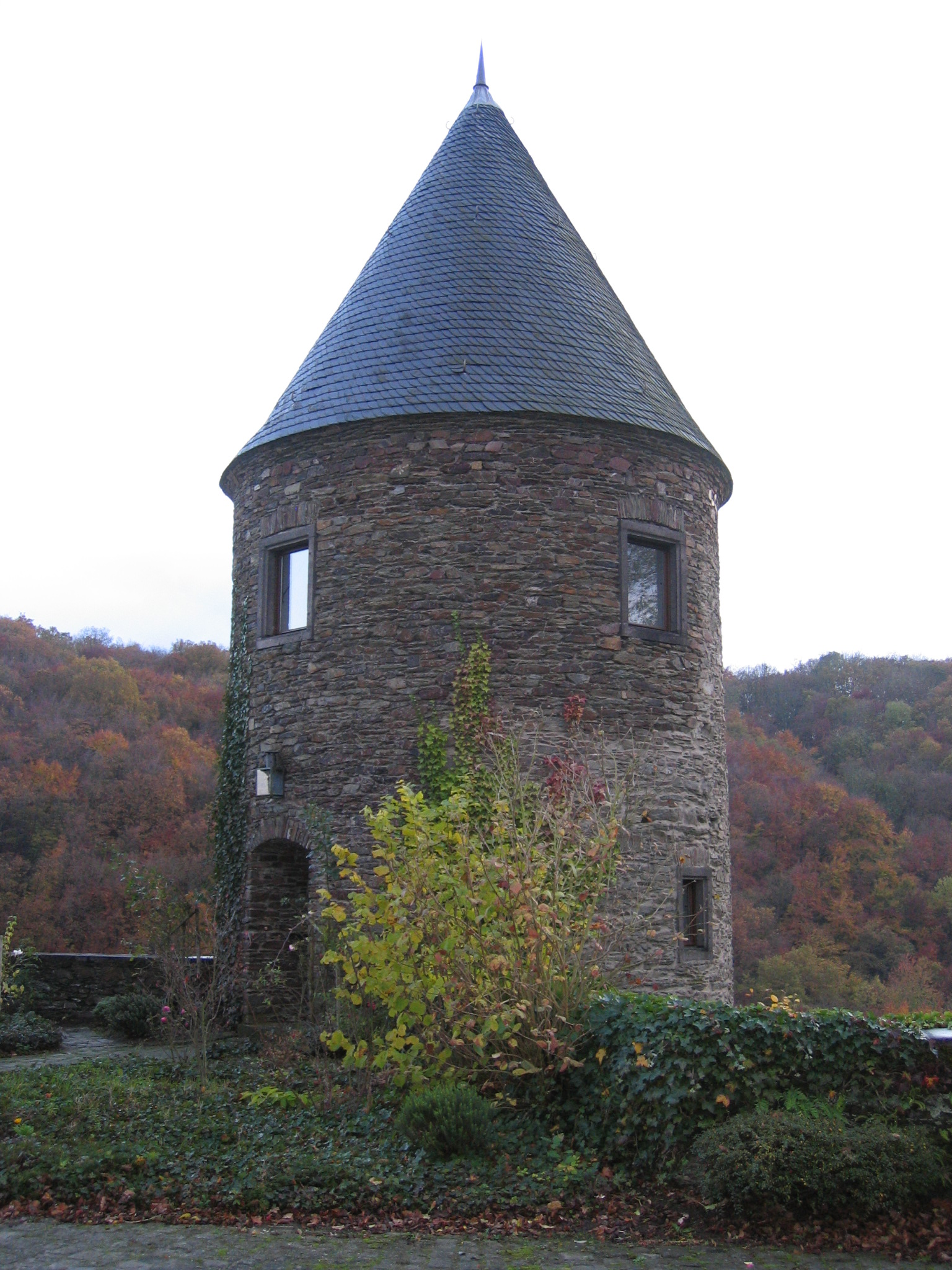
One of the round towers of the old Zwinger

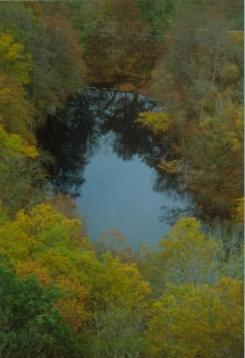
Castle pond

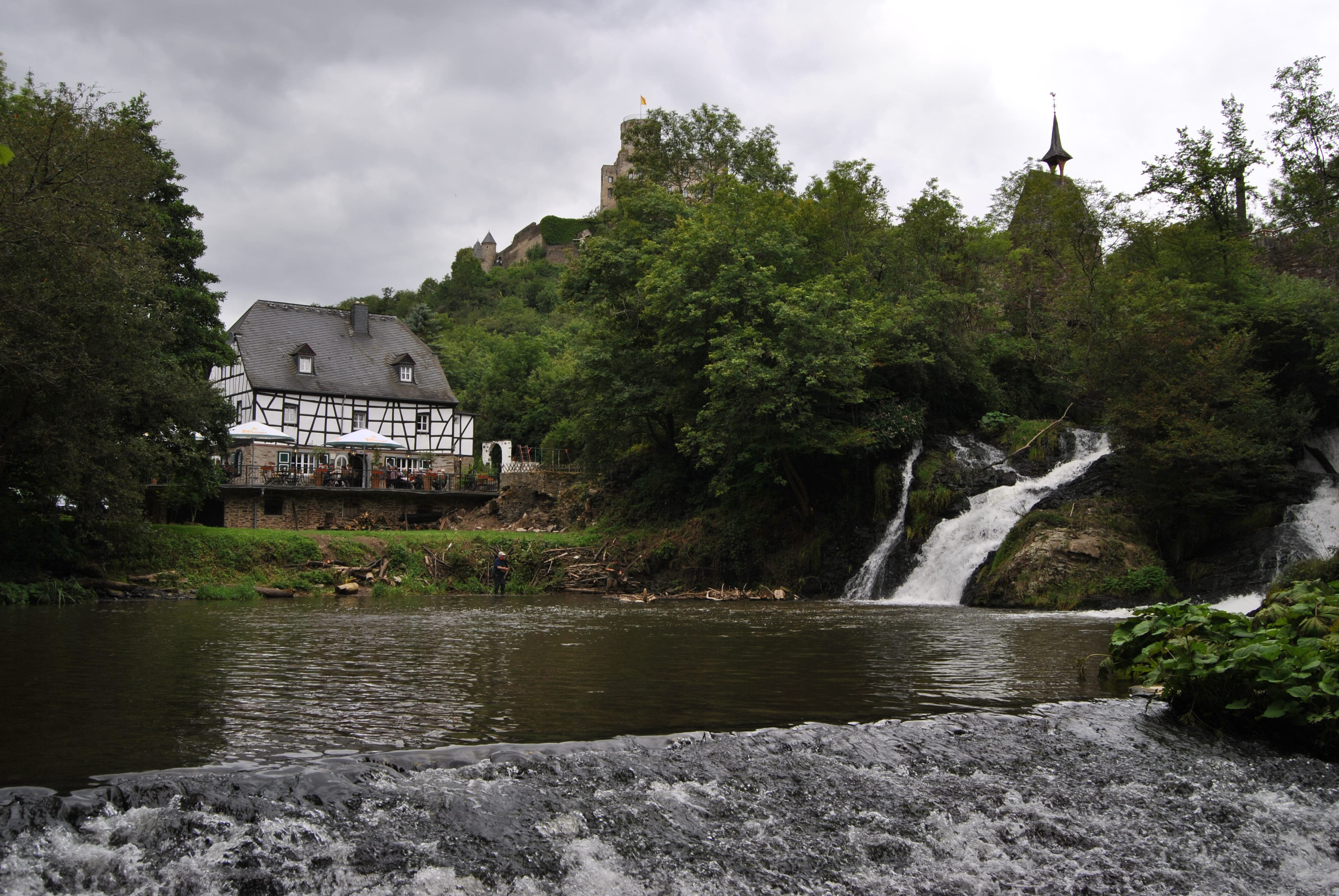
Pyrmont Mill on the Elzbach Falls with the castle behind

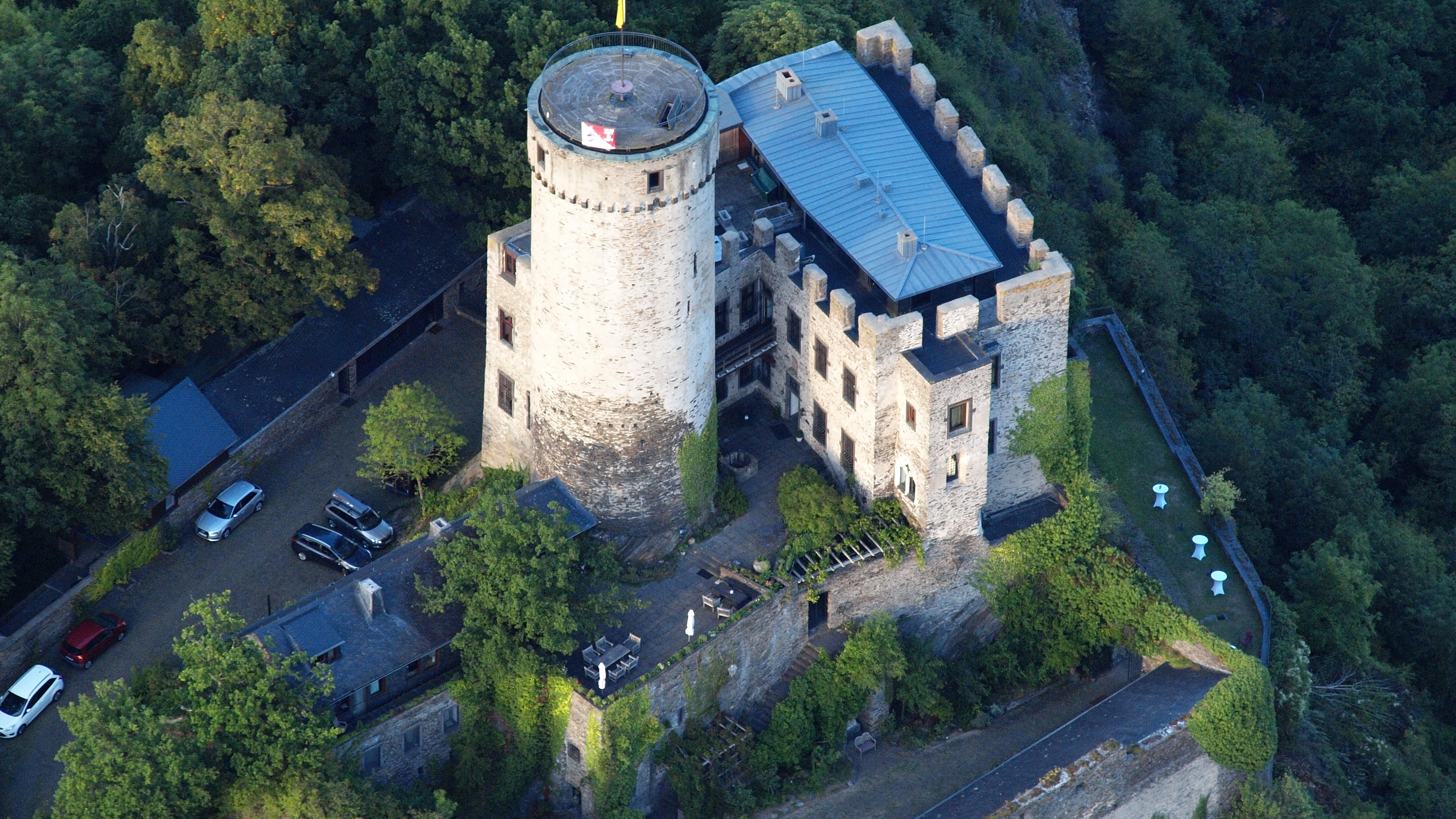
Pyrmont Castle, 2015 aerial photograph
