= Outer bailey =

Outer defense of a castle

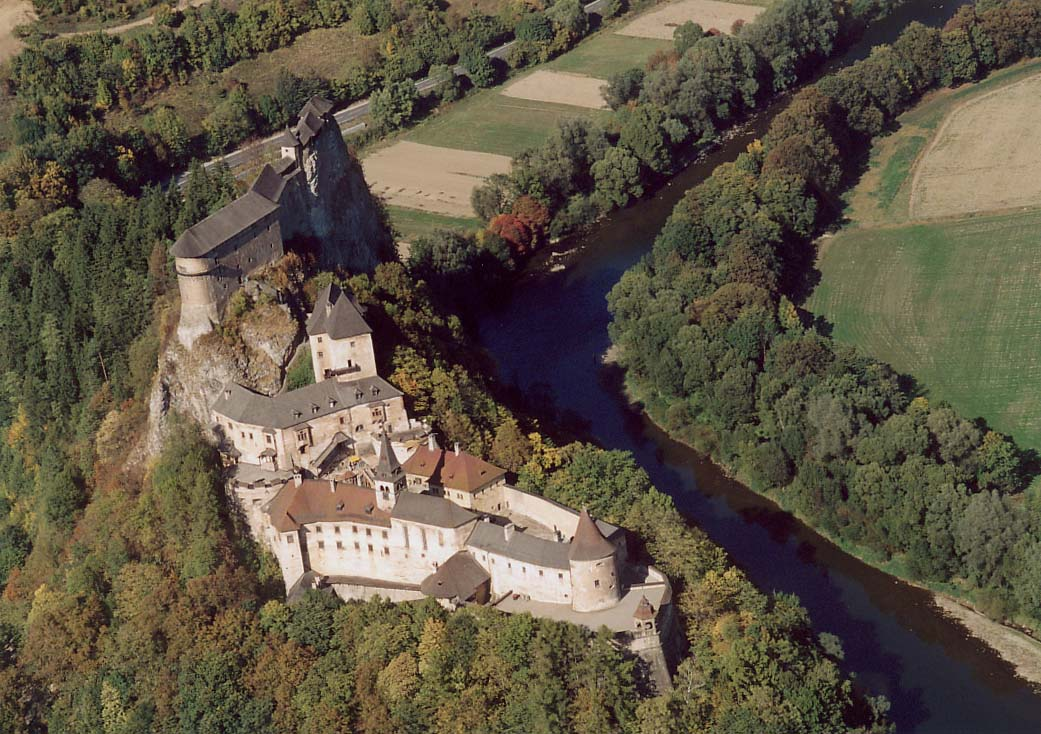
Orava Castle (Slovakia) with a large outer bailey.

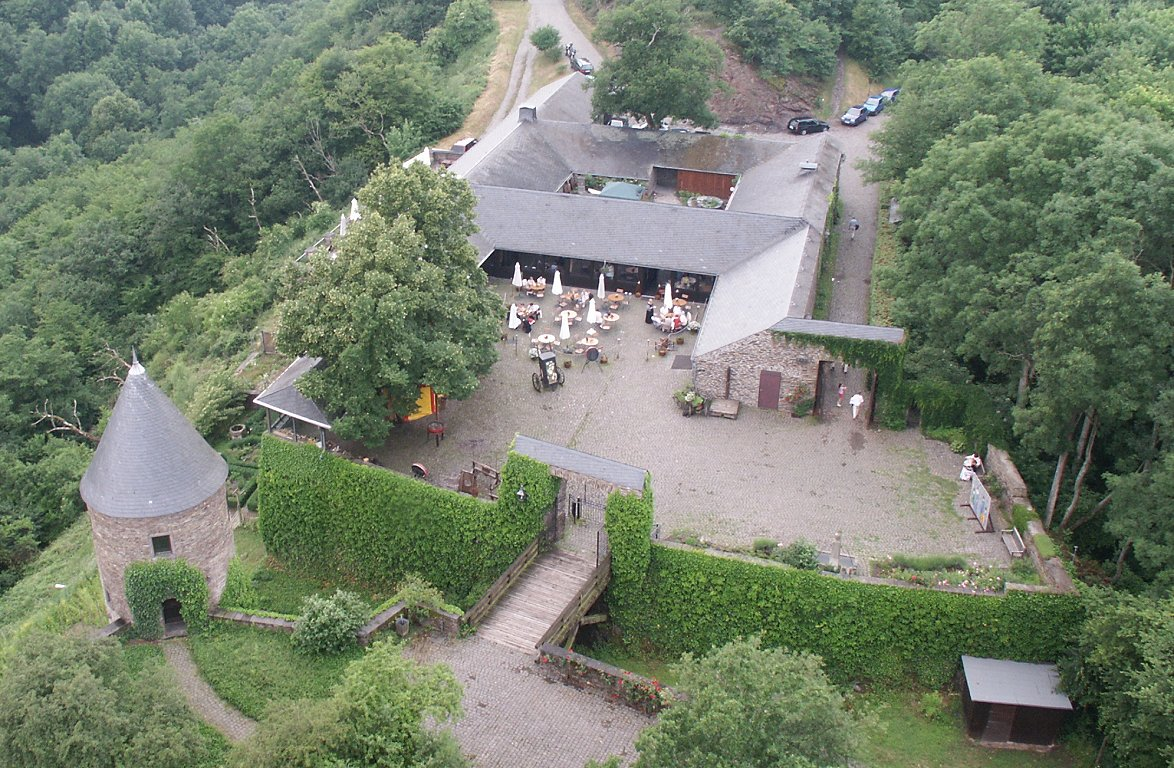
The outer bailey of Pyrmont Castle (Germany).

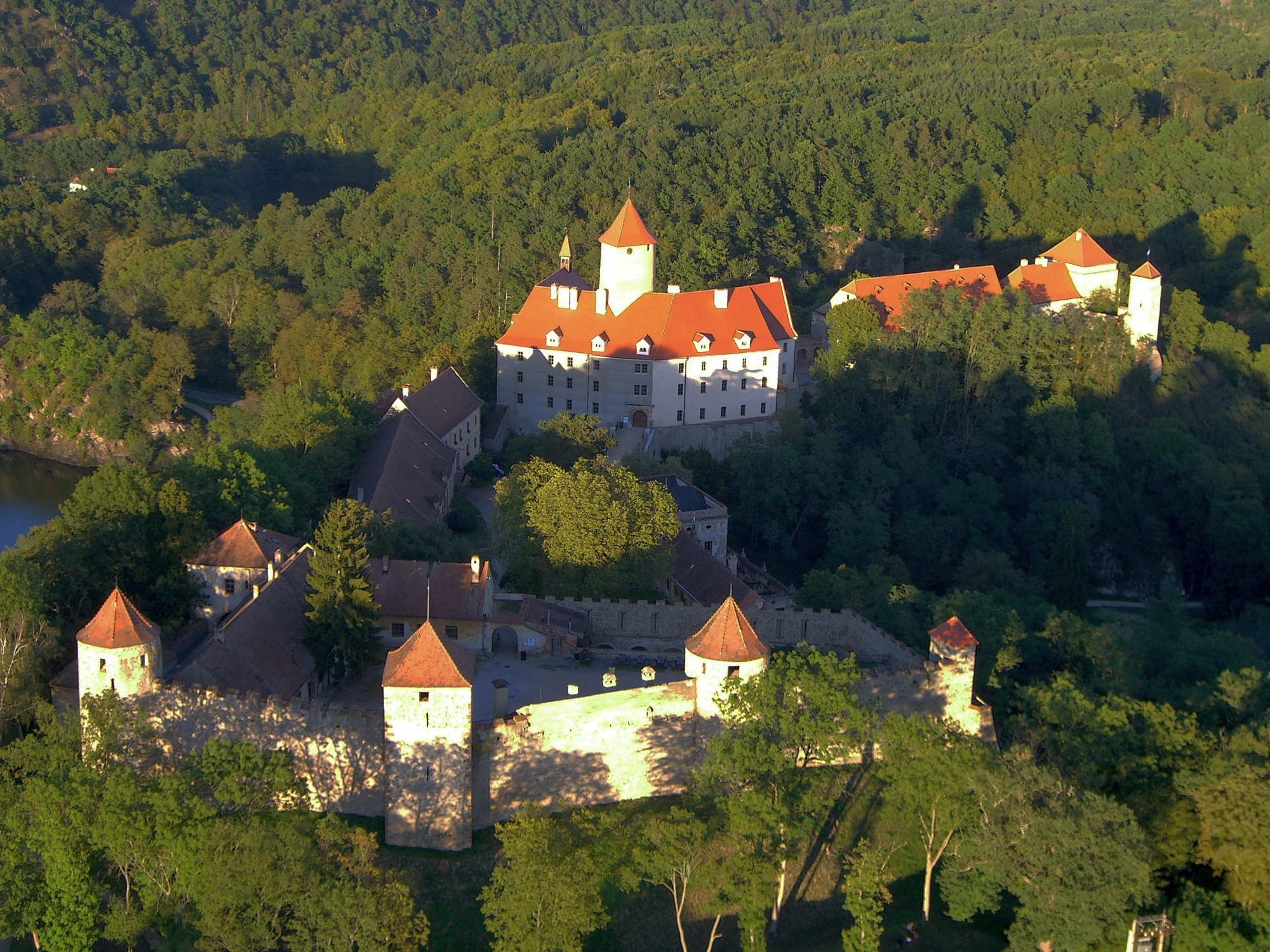
Veveří Castle in the Czech Republic with its outer bailey.

An outer bailey or outer ward is the defended outer enclosure of a castle. It protects the inner bailey and usually contains those ancillary buildings used for the management of the castle or the supply of its occupants. These domestic buildings could include workshops, livestock stalls and stables; storage facilities such as barns, sheds and granaries, as well as quarters for servants such as maids, farm workers, and even the castle governors or castellans. In many cases there was also a brewery, a bakehouse and a kitchen, if the latter was not located in the hall or palas. An outer bailey was often called a base court in England. Depending on topography it could also be referred to as a lower bailey or lower ward, the keep being in the upper bailey or ward. Chepstow Castle has lower, middle and upper baileys.

The domestic buildings of the continental schloss, often a stately home or palace, may also be referred to as an outer ward (German: Vorburg). These frequently contained a carriage house or a cavalier house, buildings that were not common in medieval castles. Large castles often have more than one bailey; examples include Monschau and Bürresheim. At some larger castles, markets were held in the outer bailey (cf. suburbium).

Outer baileys were usually enclosed and protected by a ring wall and separated from the actual living area of the castle – the inner ward and keep – by a moat, a wall and a gate.

In lowland castles, the outer bailey is usually arranged in a half-moon shape around the main castle. In the case of hill castles, the topographic features of the terrain had to be taken account of, with the result that the outer bailey was usually slightly lower than the inner ward, hence the alternative names of "lower bailey" or "lower ward". Rudelsburg Castle in Saxony-Anhalt is one of the rare cases of a hill castle where both baileys are at the same level.

In many cases the main entrance to the inner living quarters led through the outer bailey, which thus formed a kind of defensive buffer and often also served as refuge for the villagers who lived outside the castle walls. This explains why the castle chapel was often found in the bailey: it served as the parish church for the commoners.

== See also ==
- Bailey (castle)
- Inner bailey
- Motte and bailey

== Literature ==
- Horst Wolfgang Böhme, Reinhard Friedrich, Barbara Schock-Werner (ed.): Dictionary of castles, palaces and fortresses. Reclam, Stuttgart 2004, ISBN 3-15-010547-1, page 255-256.
- Friedrich-Wilhelm Krahe: Castles and tower houses of the German Middle Ages. Volume 1 Thorbecke, Stuttgart 2002, ISBN 3-7995-0104-5, page 53-55.
- Otto Piper: Burgenkunde. Reprint of the edition of 1912. Weltbild, Augsburg 1994, ISBN 3-89350-554-7, pp. 10–11.
