= Hubert Petschnigg =

Austrian architect

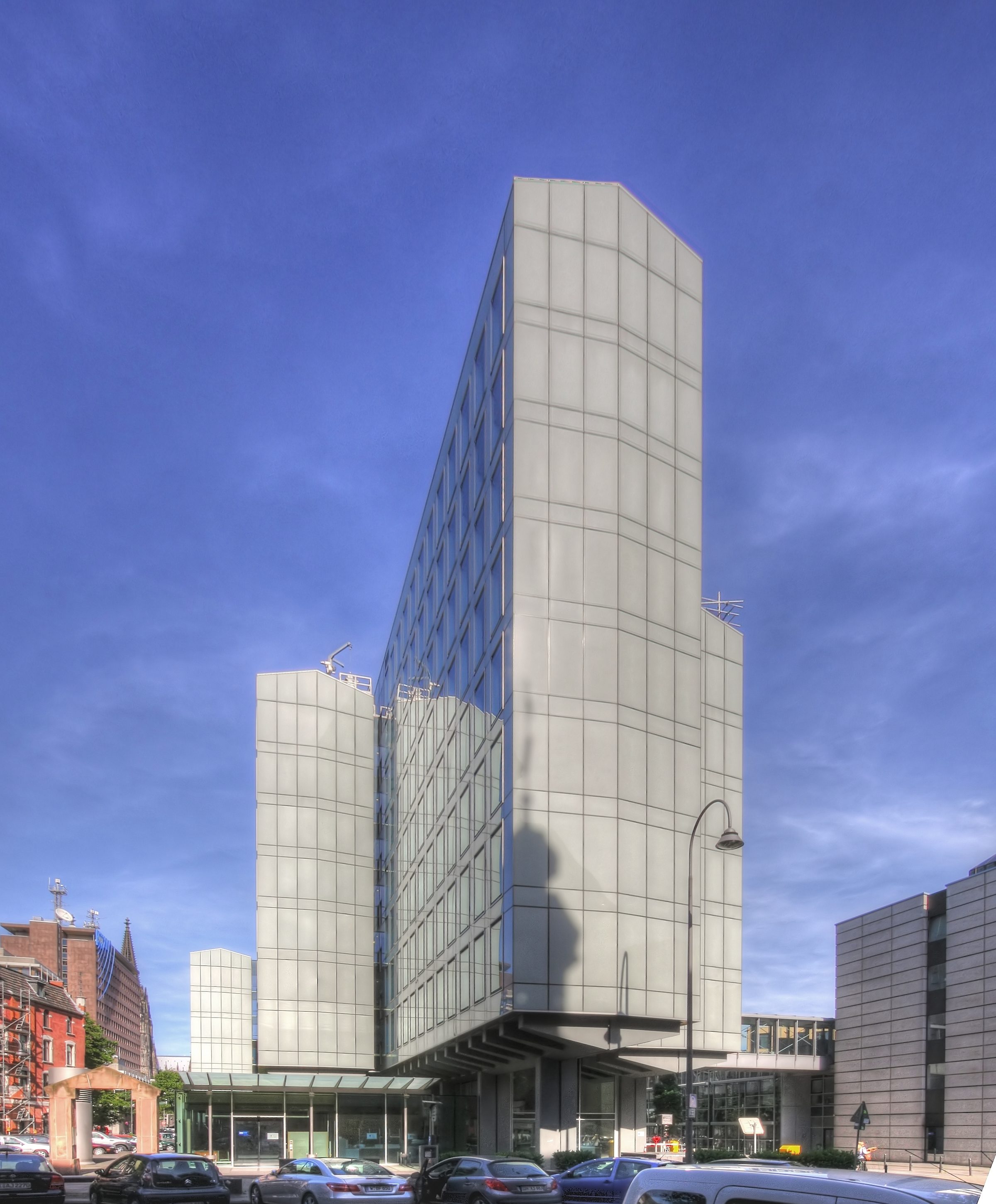
The Vierscheibenhaus in Cologne.

Hubert Petschnigg (31 October 1913 – 15 September 1997) was an Austrian architect.

== Life ==
Petschnigg was born in Klagenfurt and went to school in Villach. In 1934 he began to study architecture at the Vienna University of Technology, where he entered the Hansea Vienna branch of the Kösener Corps student society. Before he could graduate, however, he was called up for military service. After the Second World War he resumed his studies at the Graz University of Technology (TU Graz), under Karl Raimund Lorenz and Friedrich Zotter, and graduated with an engineering degree in 1947.

In 1948 he began working at the architectural firm of Helmut Hentrich and Hans Heuser. After Heuser's death in 1953, Petschnigg became his replacement and founded the HP firm together with Hentrich. The firm was expanded to six partners in 1959 and renamed HPP Hentrich, Petschnigg & Partners. Over the following decades it became one of the most prolific and best-known architectural firms in Germany.

In 1962 Petschnigg was granted entry to the Corps Marchia Brünn branch of the Kösener Corps in Trier. He was named "Honorary Senator" of TU Graz in 1977, and in 1982 the government of West Germany awarded him the Federal Cross of Merit – a particular honour for Petschnigg, as he was Austrian. In 1988 he became an honorary member of the Engineers' and Architects' Association of North Rhine-Westphalia.

Petschnigg's particular passion was the maintenance of memorials. He also restored old buildings, including Pyrmont Castle in the Eifel, in which he spent his final years, living with his wife as the castle's keeper. He died in 1997.

== Works ==
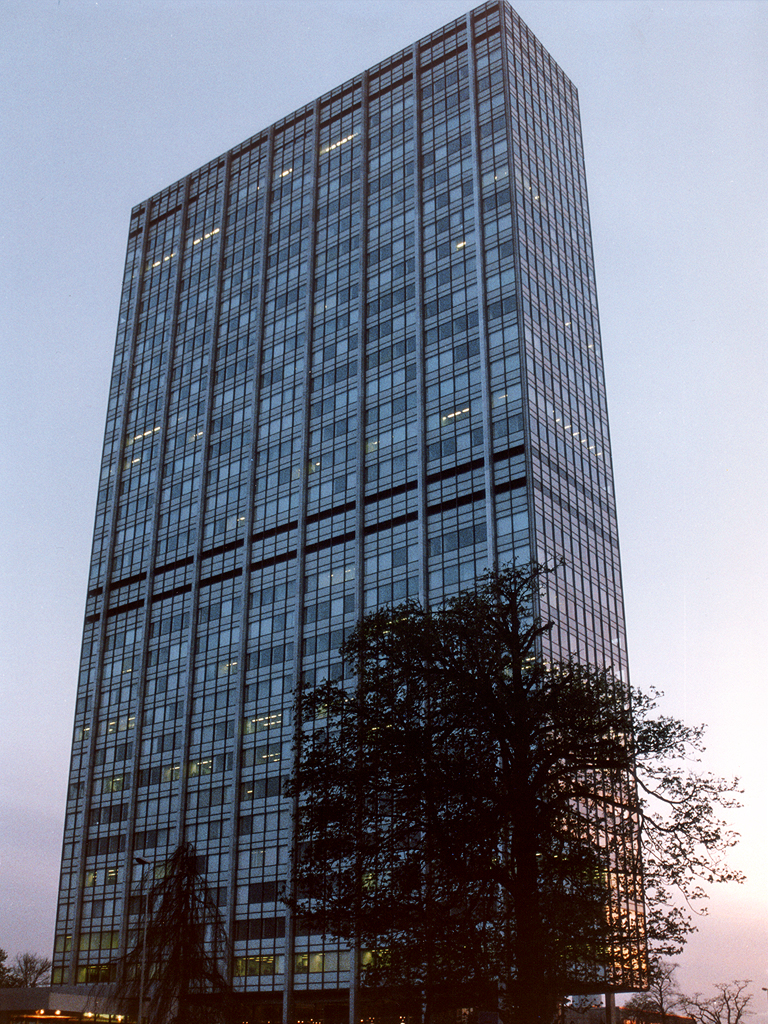
The Bayer-Hochhaus in Leverkusen.

Petschnigg produced his most important works as a partner of the HPP firm that he had founded with Helmut Hentrich. These included the headquarters of VEBA (now E.ON) in Düsseldorf, the Ministry of the Interior for North Rhine-Westphalia, the RWI Essen research centre, the TÜV Rheinland building in Cologne, the Ruhr University Bochum, and the Europa-Center in Berlin.
