= Helmut Hentrich =

German architect

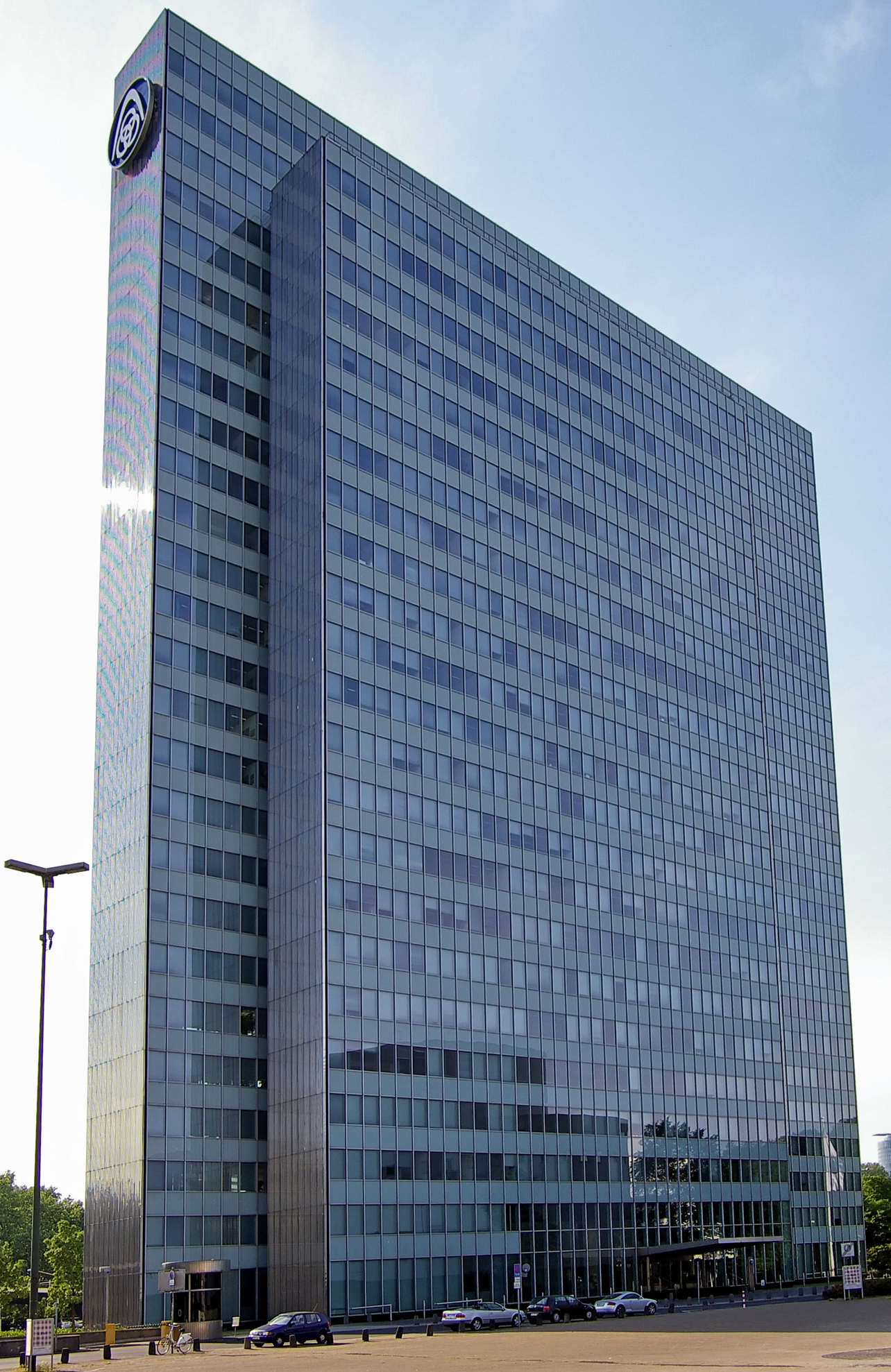
Dreischeibenhaus in Düsseldorf (1957–1960)

Helmut Hentrich (17 June 1905 – 7 February 2001) was a German architect who became particularly known for his striking high-rise buildings in the 1960s and 1970s. The architectural firm he founded, Hentrich, Petschnigg und Partner (HPP), still exists under the name HPP Architekten.

== Life ==
=== Education ===
Born in Krefeld, Hentrich was the son of the civil engineer Hubert Hentrich. Already during his school years, he was interested in art, architecture and completed internships in the architectural offices of August Biebricher and Franz Brantzky.

After graduating from high school, Hentrich initially gave in to his father's urging and began studying law at the Albert Ludwigs University of Freiburg in Breisgau in 1922, but switched to the architecture faculty of the Technische Hochschule in Vienna (now Vienna University of Technology) in 1924 and a year later to the Technische Hochschule Berlin (now Technische Universität Berlin) to study under Hans Poelzig, Heinrich Tessenow and Hermann Jansen.

In Berlin, Hentrich became acquainted with modern architecture, which was on the rise, and worked in the architectural offices of Hugo Häring and Ludwig Mies van der Rohe during semester breaks, but it was above all Hans Poelzig who shaped his understanding of architecture. During his studies in Berlin, he met Albert Speer, Friedrich Tamms and Rudolf Wolters, who also studied there. Hentrich passed his diploma main examination with distinction in 1928.

=== 1929 until 1945 ===
After graduating, Hentrich began a Referendariat in 1929. (as Regierungsbauführer) in order to qualify for civil service. He worked as a construction supervisor on the reconstruction of the Andreaskirche in Düsseldorf's old town. Also in 1929, he received the Schinkelpreis for the design of a College for the Art of Dance, with which his father had also been awarded in 1892, and earned his doctorate at the Vienna University of Technology with a thesis on modern dance theatre based on this design.

In the early 1930s he worked in Paris in the architectural practice of Ernő Goldfinger and in New York City in the architectural practice of Norman Bel Geddes and travelled extensively in the US, China, India and other countries.

Returning to Germany, Hentrich passed the second state examination to become a government architect (assessor) in 1933. He was to take up a position in the state building construction office Gussew (East Prussia), but chose the path of self-employment and opened an architectural office in Düsseldorf in the same year. After initially working with Hans Heuser, Hentrich founded an office partnership with him in 1935 (Hentrich & Heuser) and was able to establish himself in Düsseldorf with competition successes and residential buildings.

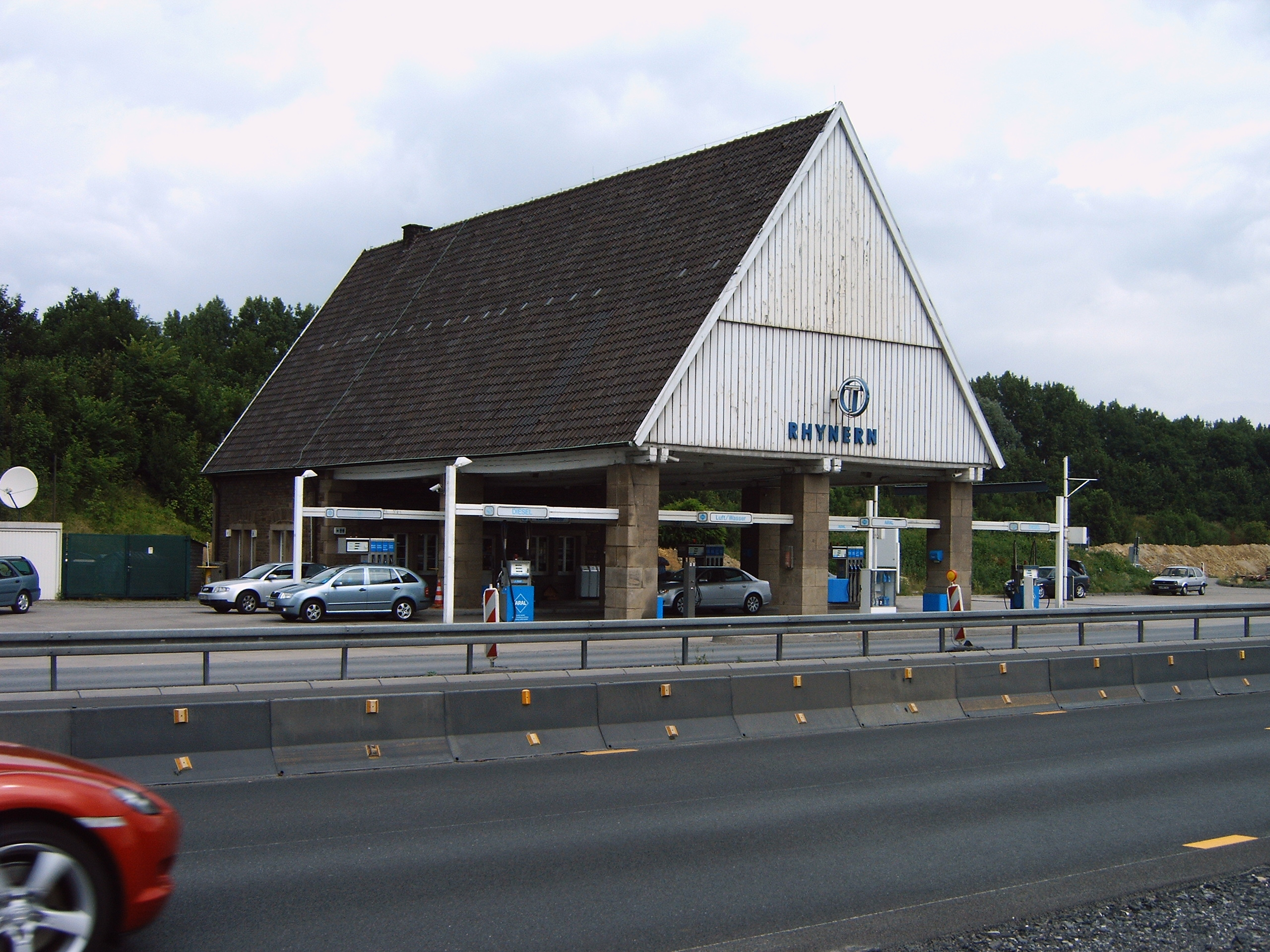
Autobahnraststätte Rhynern 1937–1938, in operation until 2005

Both won a competition for the Orsoy Deichtor in 1937 and increasingly took part in official competitions of the Organisation Todt or the Hitler Youth. The year before, Hentrich had already been accepted as a member of the Academy for Urban, Reich and Regional Planning. In 1938, he was represented at the Second German Architecture Exhibition of the National Socialists in the Munich Haus der Kunst with the Reichsautobahn-Rasthof Rhynern.

From 1938 onwards, Hentrich was a member of the working staff of Generalbauinspektor (GBI) for the Reich capital Berlin (among others façade design of the Reich Insurance Office) and was a member of the "Arbeitsstab Wiederaufbauplanung" ("Reconstruction Staff Speer") created on 11 October 1943 for the cities destroyed in the war (among other things. reconstruction planning for his native town of Krefeld, or urban planning designs for the redesign of Hamburg by Konstanty Gutschow). In 1941-1945, Hentrich was a member of the National Socialist German Workers' Party. In the final phase of World War II, Hentrich was included by Hitler in the Gottbegnadeten list of the most important architects, which saved him from wartime service.

Hentrich wrote in his memoirs (Bauzeit. Aufzeichnungen aus dem Leben eines Architekten. Düsseldorf 1995,) about his work in the Third Reich: "The interesting work on these buildings was always only factual and never coloured by political aspects." He carried out commissions for the Organisation Todt.

=== After 1945 ===
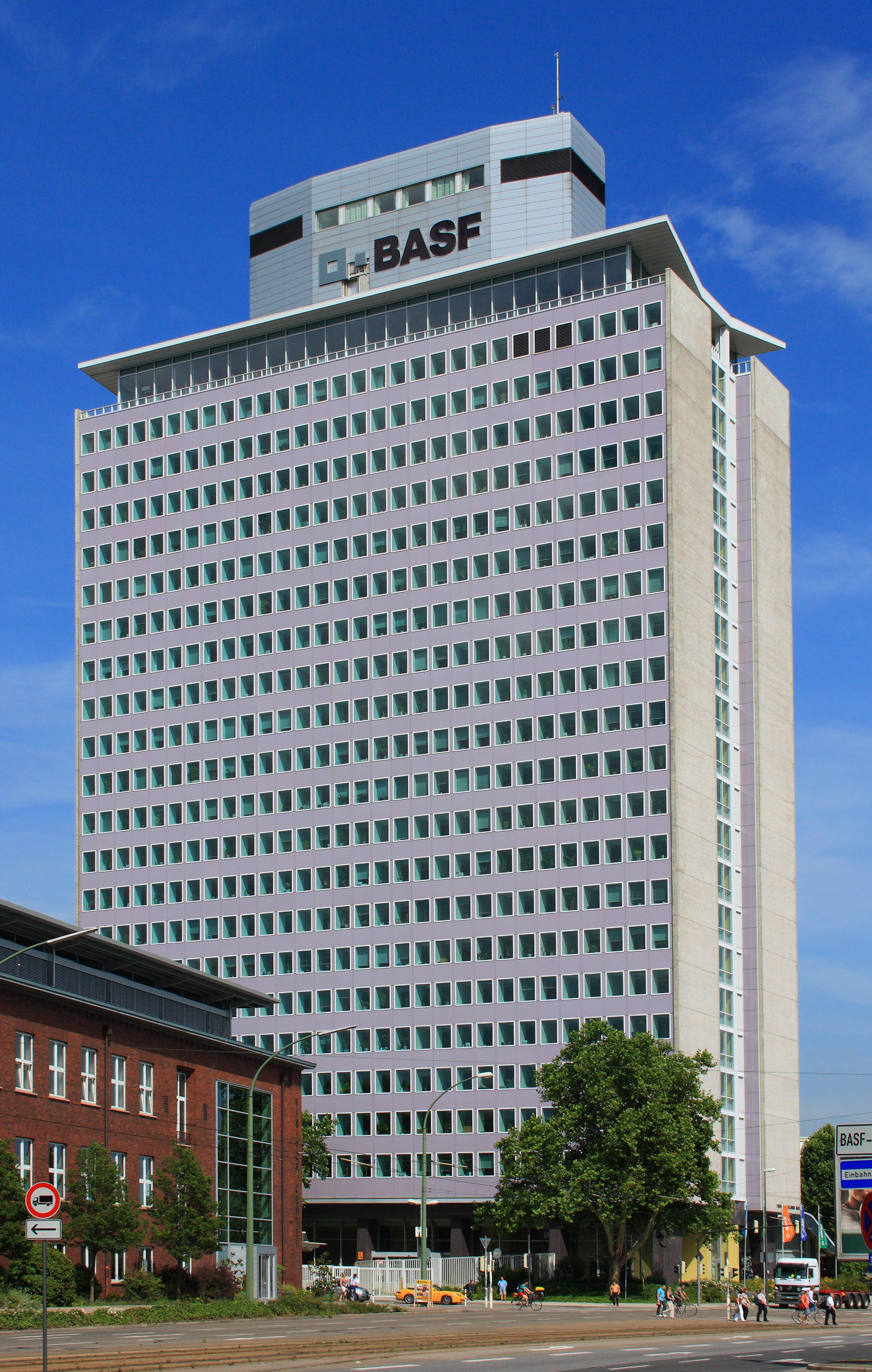
Friedrich-Engelhorn-Hochhaus, Ludwigshafen (1954–1957) Demolition 2013-2014

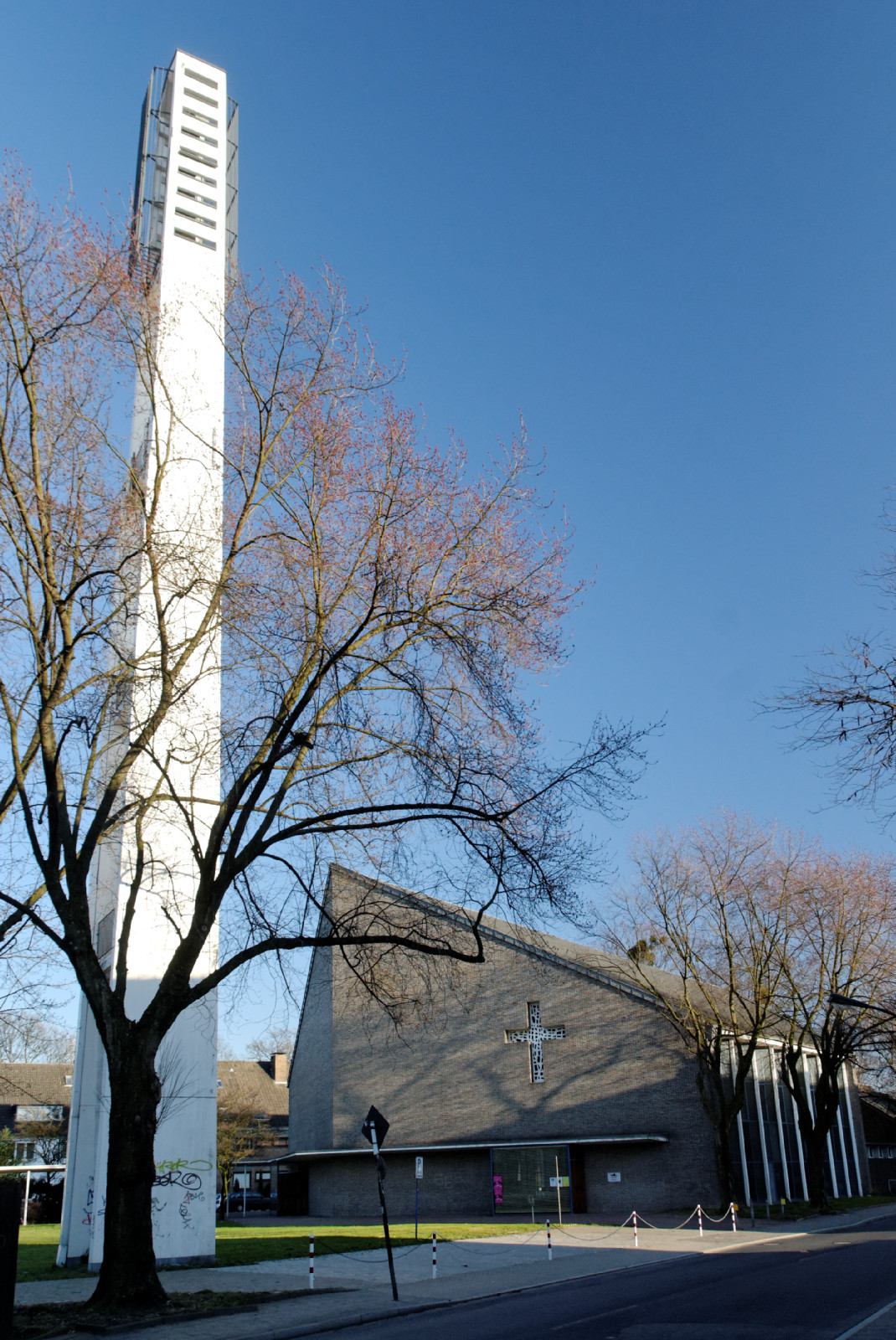
Petruskirche in Düsseldorf-Unterrath (1955–1956)

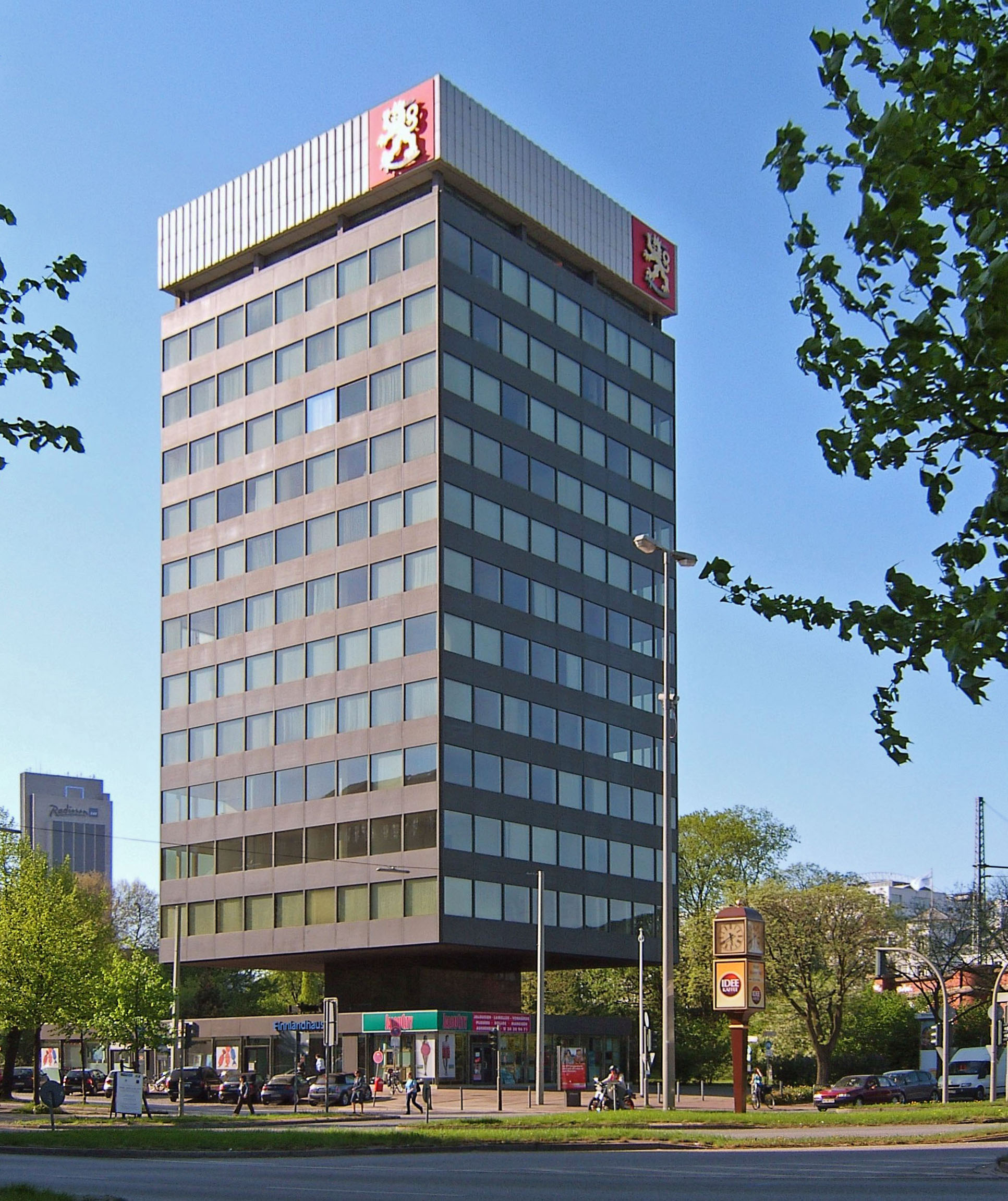
Finnlandhaus in Hamburg at the Esplanade, innovative suspended construction built 1963-1966 according to plans by Hentrich and Petschnigg.

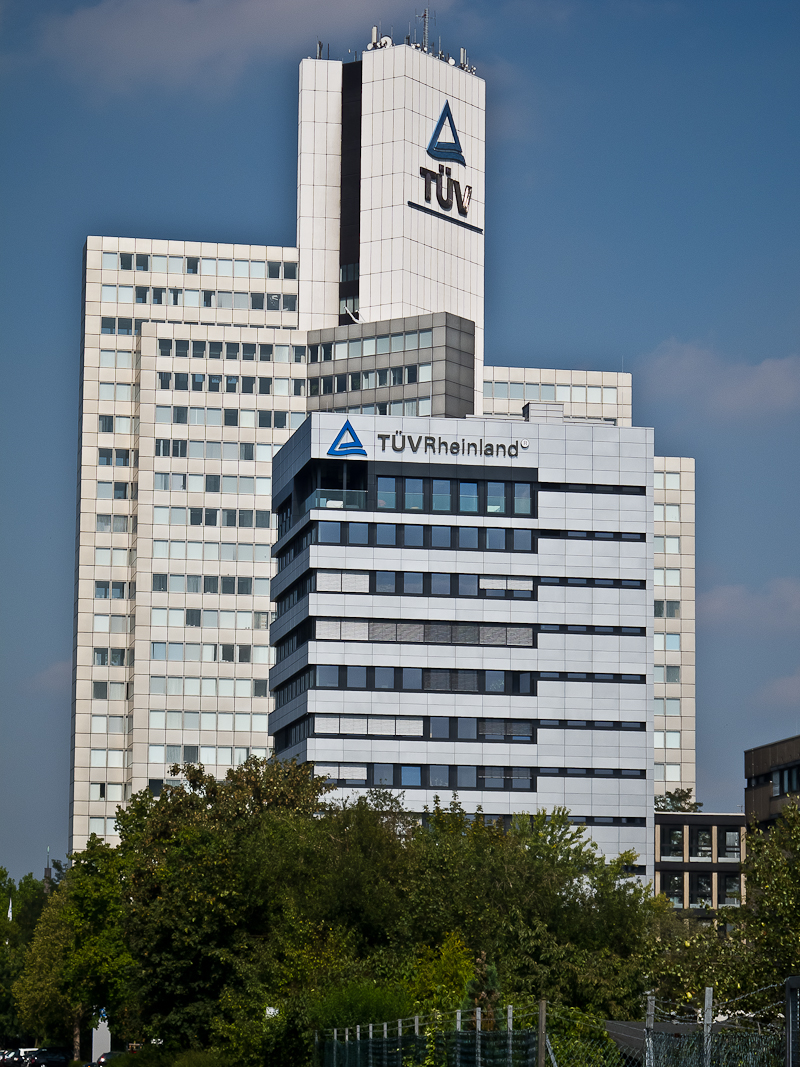
TÜV Rheinland-Hochhaus in Poll, Cologne (1970–1974)

In the post-war period, Hentrich hit the headlines when the Düsseldorfer Architektenstreit, founded by Bernhard Pfau, accused the head of the city planning office, Friedrich Tamms, of favouring formerly high-ranking friends from the staff of the general building inspector - who, in addition to Julius Schulte-Frohlinde, Konstanty Gutschow and Rudolf Wolters, also included Hentrich. "In fact, Düsseldorf is becoming a centre of former Nazi prominence," the architects' association formulated in a memorandum. Despite these objections, Hentrich - an honorary member of the cultural committee of the city of Düsseldorf - was able to participate in the reconstruction plans for the city; his architectural office shaped the appearance of the inner city with representative banks and administrative buildings. It certainly helped that Hentrich's student friend Friedrich Tamms was head of the city planning office and Julius Schulte-Frohlinde had been head of the structural engineering office of the city of Düsseldorf since 1952. After the death of Hans Heuser in 1953, Hentrich took Hubert Petschnigg into the architectural office.

While Hentrich's commercial buildings of the early post-war period still had strong echoes of the neoclassicism of the 1930s, later Hentrich's buildings were characterised by the International Style with its cool objectivity determined by glass and steel. Hentrich gained worldwide recognition with the construction of the Dreischeibenhaus from 1957 to 1960; with its significant appearance, the building is still one of the best-known and most important high-rise buildings in Germany. In 1969, the office partnership was expanded by six partners and renamed HPP Hentrich-Petschnigg & Partner. HPP subsequently won numerous competitions and developed into one of the largest architectural firms of the post-war period, specialising in the field of administrative buildings. In 13 cities in West Germany and South Africa, their large office built a total of more than 40 high-rise buildings.

In addition, Hentrich was chairman of the board of the Malkasten in Düsseldorf 1945-1955.

In 1960, Hentrich was appointed professor by the state government of North Rhine-Westphalia.

In 1972, the office partnership was transformed into a limited partnership. Two years later, Hentrich and Petschnigg transferred the management of the office to their two partners Hans Joachim Stutz and Rüdiger Thoma. They themselves retired to the office's advisory board, but continued to participate in the various projects.

Hentrich owned an important collection of antique and Islamic glass art, as well as Art Nouveau and Art Nouveau objects; this collection was donated to the Museum Kunstpalast as Glasmuseum Hentrich in 1963.

Hentrich died in Düsseeldorf at the age of 95.

== Realisations ==
- 1934–1935: Einfamilienhaus für Schmitz-Egelhoff in Krefeld.
- 1935–1936: Kopfhaus in Düsseldorf, Scheibenstraße / Inselstraße 34 (with Hans Heuser)
- 1937–1938: Hitlerjugend-Heim in Rheinhausen, Werthauser Straße (with Hans Heuser).
- 1937: Musterhaus zur Reichsausstellung Schaffendes Volk for sculptor Hellwig Reiss-Schmidt (b. 1904) in der Künstlersiedlung Schlageterstadt (today Golzheimer settlement), Franz-Jürgens-Straße 10
- 1937–1938: Deichtor in Orsoy (with Hans Heuser).
- 1938–1939: Jugendheim in Hilden
- 1938: Jagdhaus Brandt in Brandenberg (Hürtgenwald).
- vor 1939: Einfamilienhaus für Dr. Rohde in Düsseldorf.
- vor 1939: Haus für Dr. Blassendorf in Meerbusch.
- vor 1939: Fünffamilienhaus für Poensgen in Düsseldorf, Rheinallee (with Hans Heuser).
- vor 1943: Haus Ö. [Oetker] in Krefeld (with Hans Heuser).
- 1949: Werkswohnungen (Zwei Doppelhäuser) für FA Kümpers in Rheine, Basilikastraße (with Hans Heuser)
- 1949–1950: HSBC Trinkaus in Düsseldorf
- 1949–1953: Gerling-Hochhaus in Cologne (Entwurf with Hans Heuser, Änderungen durch Hans Gerling).
- 1951–1952: Drahthaus in Düsseldorf (with Hans Heuser)
- 1952–1953: Aluminiumhaus in Pempelfort, Jägerhofstraße 29 (with Hans Heuser)
- 1952–1953: Haus des Einzelhandelsverbandes in Düsseldorf-Pempelfort, Kaiserstraße 42
- 1952: Bankhaus Heinz Ansmann in Düsseldorf (with Hans Heuser)
- 1953–1954: Christuskirche in Düren
- 1954: Hentrichhaus, Malkasten, Düsseldorf-Pempelfort
- 1954–1957: Friedrich-Engelhorn-Hochhaus in Ludwigshafen
- 1955–1956: evangelische Petruskirche in Düsseldorf-Unterrath
- 1956: Aula der Rheinischen Friedrich-Wilhelms-Universität Bonn
- 1957–1960: Bürohochhaus für die Phoenix-Rheinrohr AG (genannt Dreischeibenhaus or Thyssen-Haus) in Düsseldorf
- 1960–1961: ehemaliges Kasino R 55 (Werkskantine) des Bayer-Werks Krefeld-Uerdingen (with Hubert Petschnigg), unter Denkmalschutz 2020 auf Antrag des Eigentümers abgerissen
- 1960–1963: Bayer-Hochhaus in Leverkusen.
- 1958–1960: BAT-Hochhaus in Hamburg
- 1961–1964: Unilever-Haus in Hamburg (today Emporio-Hochhaus)
- 1961–1964: KHD-Hochhaus (now trade fair tower) in Cologne
- 1961–1967: Conversion of the Palais Nesselrode for the Hetjens-Museum in Düsseldorf
- 1962–1970: Construction of the Westdeutscher Rundfunk in Cologne
- before 1963: Kaufhaus Merkur in Neuss.
- before 1963: High-rise residential buildings on Dorotheenstrasse in Hamburg.
- 1963–1964: Europa-Center in Charlottenburg
- 1963–1972: Overall planning and institute building of the Ruhr University Bochum.
- 1964–1965: Protestant Dietrich-Bonhoeffer-Kirche in Düsseldorf-Garath
- 1966: Administration building of the Oberfinanzdirektion Münster (torn down).
- 1967–1968: Administration building, Rheinallee 9, Düsseldorf-Heerdt ((staff polygon, protected))
- 1967–1970: Verwaltungszentrum für Procter & Gamble in Schwalbach am Taunus
- 1968–1970: Hauptverwaltung für Rank Xerox in Düsseldorf
- 1963–1966: Finnlandhaus an der Esplanade in Hamburg
- 1965–1970: Standard Bank Center in Johannesburg
- 1970–1974: Hauptverwaltung des TÜV Rheinland e. V. in Köln-Poll
- 1971–1974: Diamond Sorting Building in Kimberley, Northern Cape
- 1972–1975: Trinkaus-Bank in Düsseldorf, Königsallee / Trinkausstraße
- 1971–1974: RWI-Haus in Düsseldorf
- 1973–1974: Haus Hentrich in Düsseldorf
- 1973–1976: Head office of the Rheinbraun in Cologne
- 1973–1978 and 2005: Tonhalle Düsseldorf
- before 1976: Conversion of a mill building in Altlayer Bach.
- 1977–1981: Marriott Riyadh Hotel in Saudi Arabia
- 1977–1980: Ministry of the Interior of the State of North Rhine-Westphalia in Düsseldorf
- 1978: Erweiterungsbau für das Fernmeldeamt Düsseldorf 1, Königsallee.
- 1979–1981: Sheraton Hotel in Essen
- 1980–1983: Forum Hotel in Mecca, Saudi Arabia
- 1980–1983: Handelsblatthaus in Düsseldorf
- 1981: Telekom-Hochhaus Dortmund.
- 1984:Post office and telecom exchange in Weiden (Köln).
- 1987: Zweit-Auslands-Telephone exchange in Frankfurt-Nied.
- 1987–1988: Conversion of the Olivandenhof in Cologne
- 1988–1993: Trianon-Hochhaus of the BfG Bank für Gemeinwirtschaft in Frankfurt
- 1990–1992: Sparkasse KölnBonn
- 1993–1996: Haus des Buches in Leipzig
- 1993–1996: Restoration and conversion of the "Tobacco Mosque" (former Yenidze cigarette factory) in Dresden
- 1994–1998: M. DuMont Schauberg-Haus in Cologne
- 1994–1995: Eurotower in Frankfurt
- 1995: Postamt Bielefeld 1.
- 1997–2001: Arena AufSchalke in Gelsenkirchen
- 1997–2000: Refurbishment and conversion of the Detlev-Rohwedder-Haus of the Federal Ministry of Finance in Berlin
- 2010: Facade conversion on "maxCologne" (former Lufthansa high-rise) in Cologne
