= Paul Wolf (architect) =

German architect

- Born: 21 November 1879; Schrozberg, Germany
- Died: 30 April 1957 (aged 77); Leonberg, Germany
- Occupation: Architect

Paul Wolf (21 November 1879 – 30 April 1957) was a German architect. His work was part of the architecture event in the art competition at the 1928 Summer Olympics.
