= Odenheim Abbey =

Coordinates: 49°11′03″N 8°46′35″E

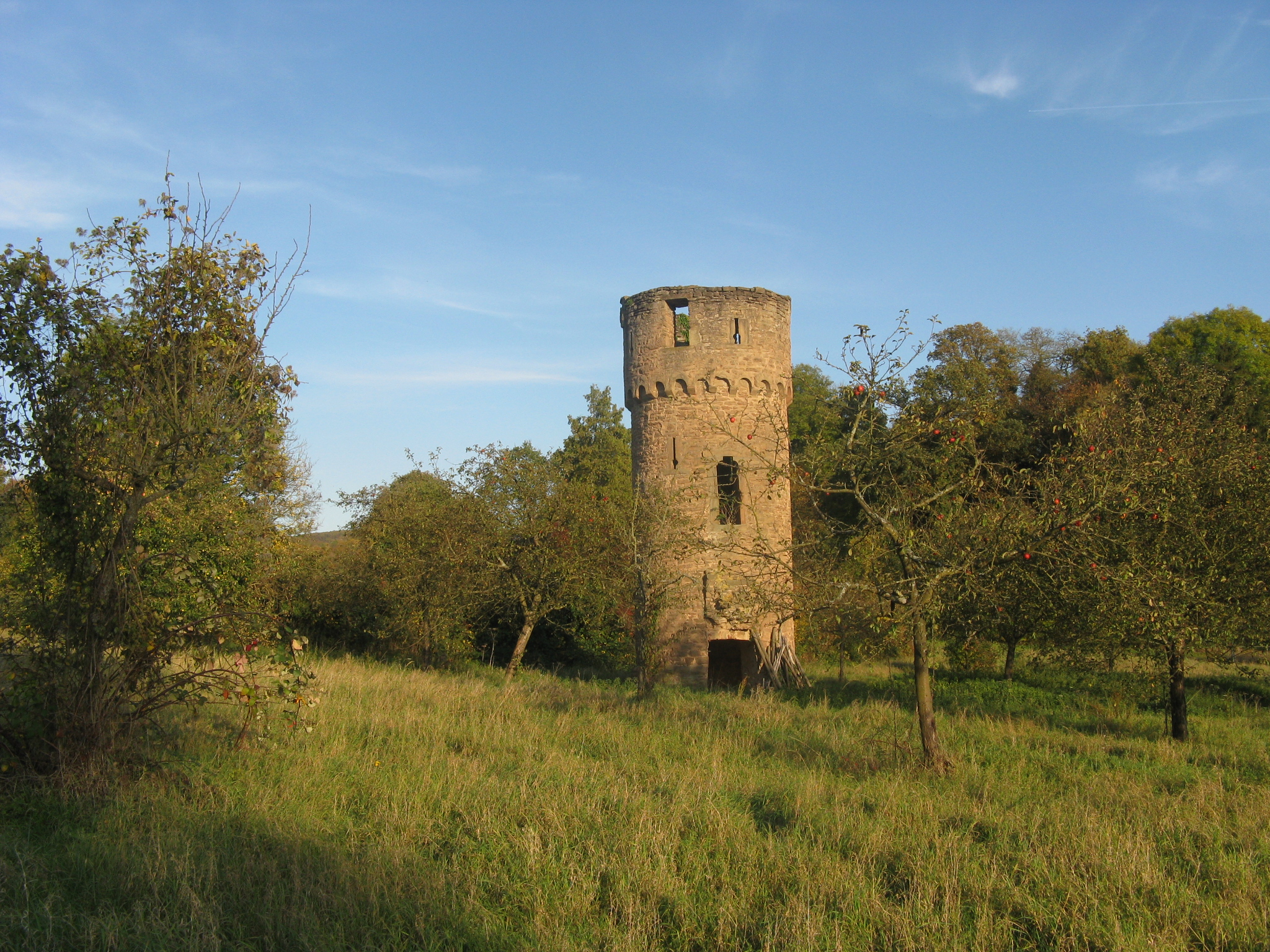
Odenheim Abbey

The Odenheim Abbey, also known as Wigoldsberg, Ritterstiftskirche Odenheim, Odenheim and Bruchsal Abbey, was an imperial priory of the Holy Roman Empire and a Benedictine convent. The convent was founded in 1122 as a Benedictine monastery in Odenheim.

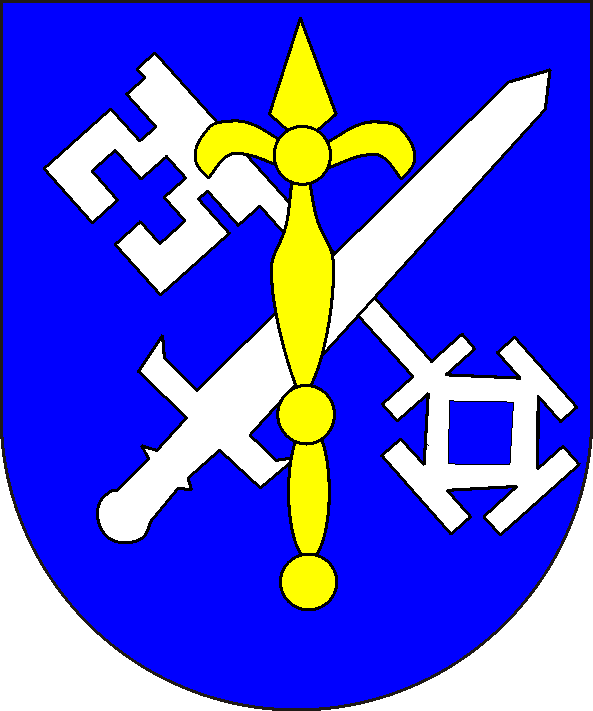
Coat of Arms of Odenheim Abbey

== History ==
Founded in 1122 it owned the town of Tiefenbach and several small villages. In 1494 it was converted into a secular canons and relocated in 1507 to Bruchsal. In 1507 the convent moved to new site in Bruchsall.

The old monastery was destroyed in 1525 during the German Peasants' War and then used as a quarry for building projects in place. The new monastery at Bruchsal was destroyed in 1676. In 1803, the sovereign abbey was secularized in the first part of the German Mediatization and handed over to the Margrave of Baden.

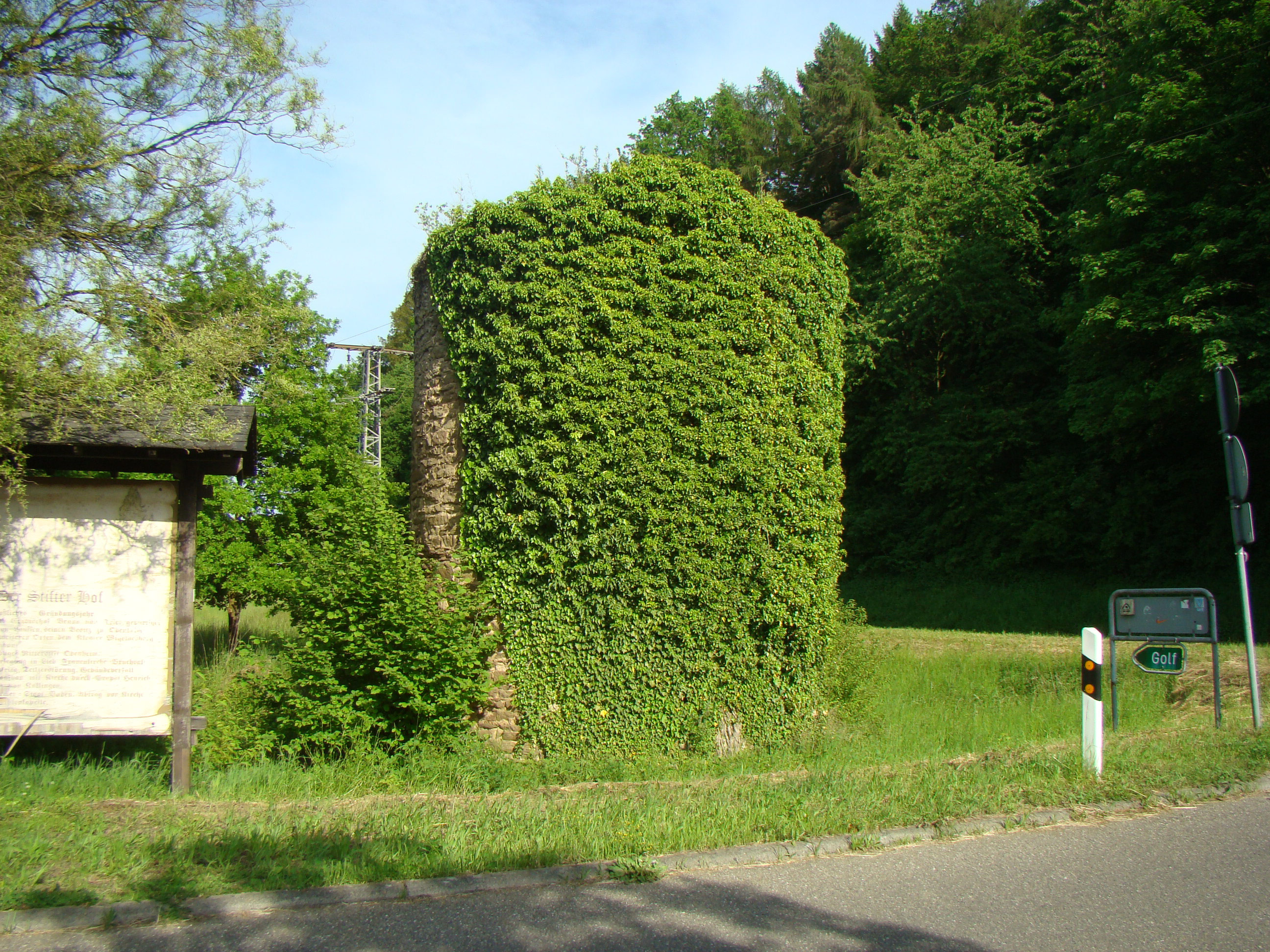

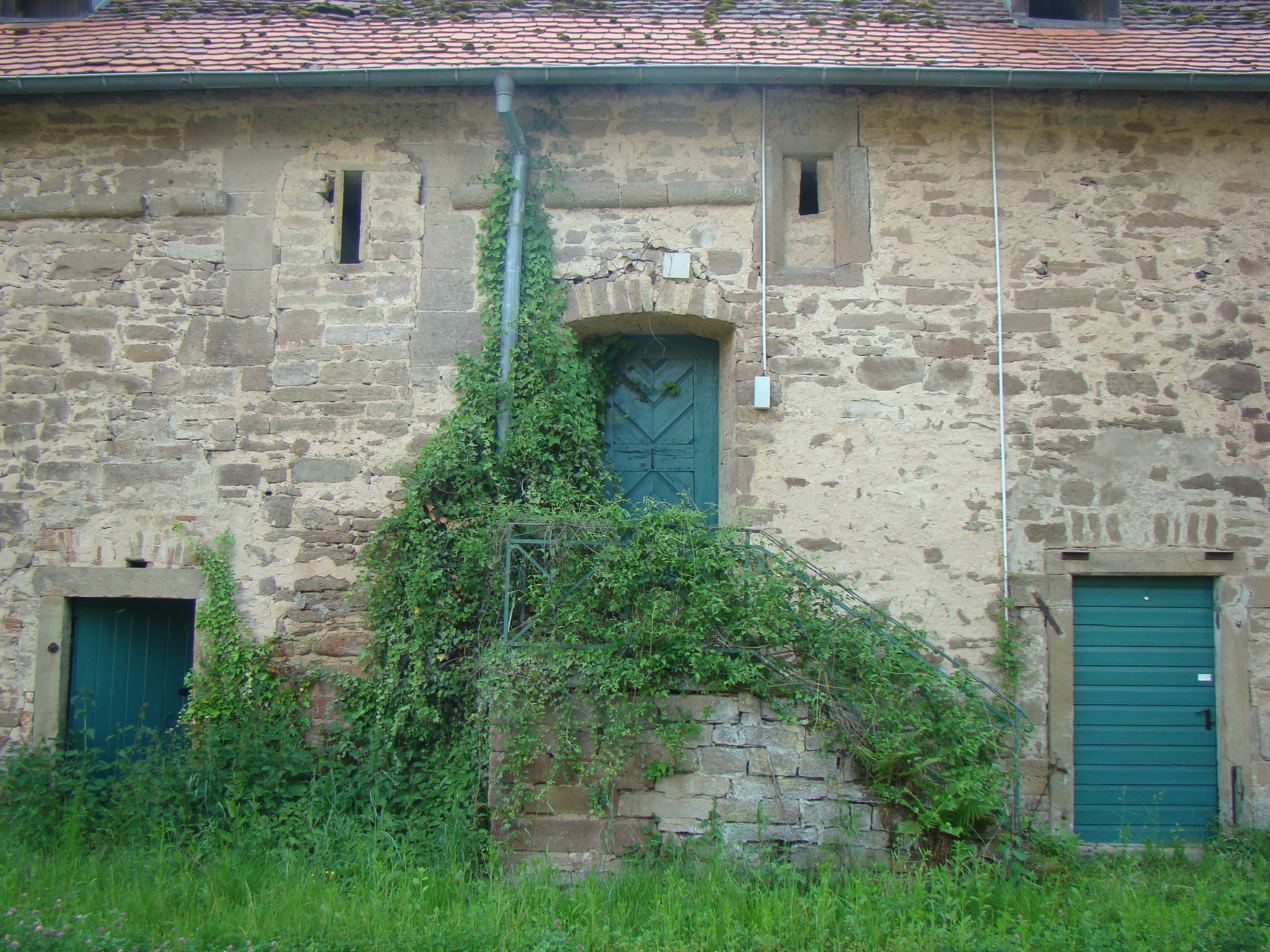

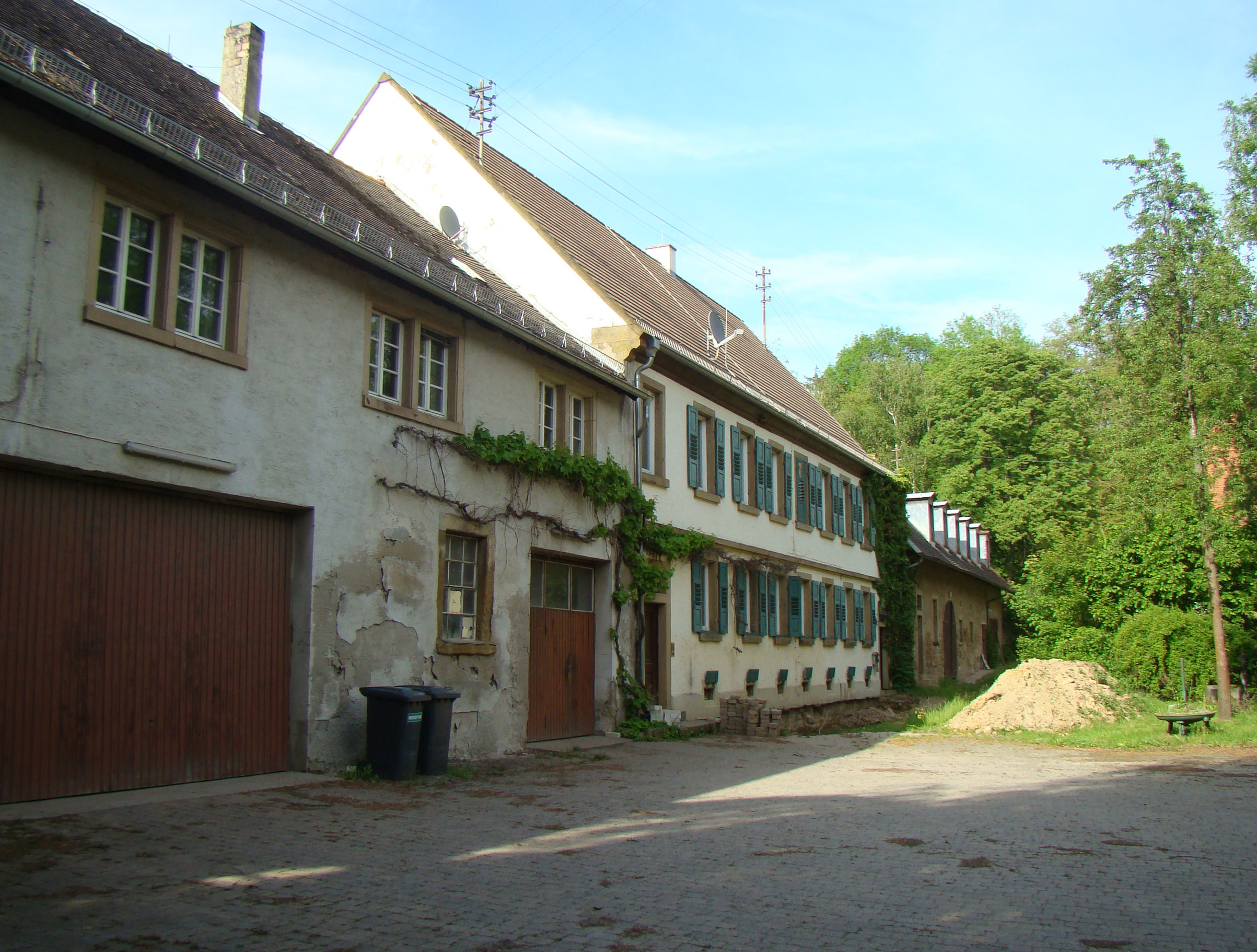

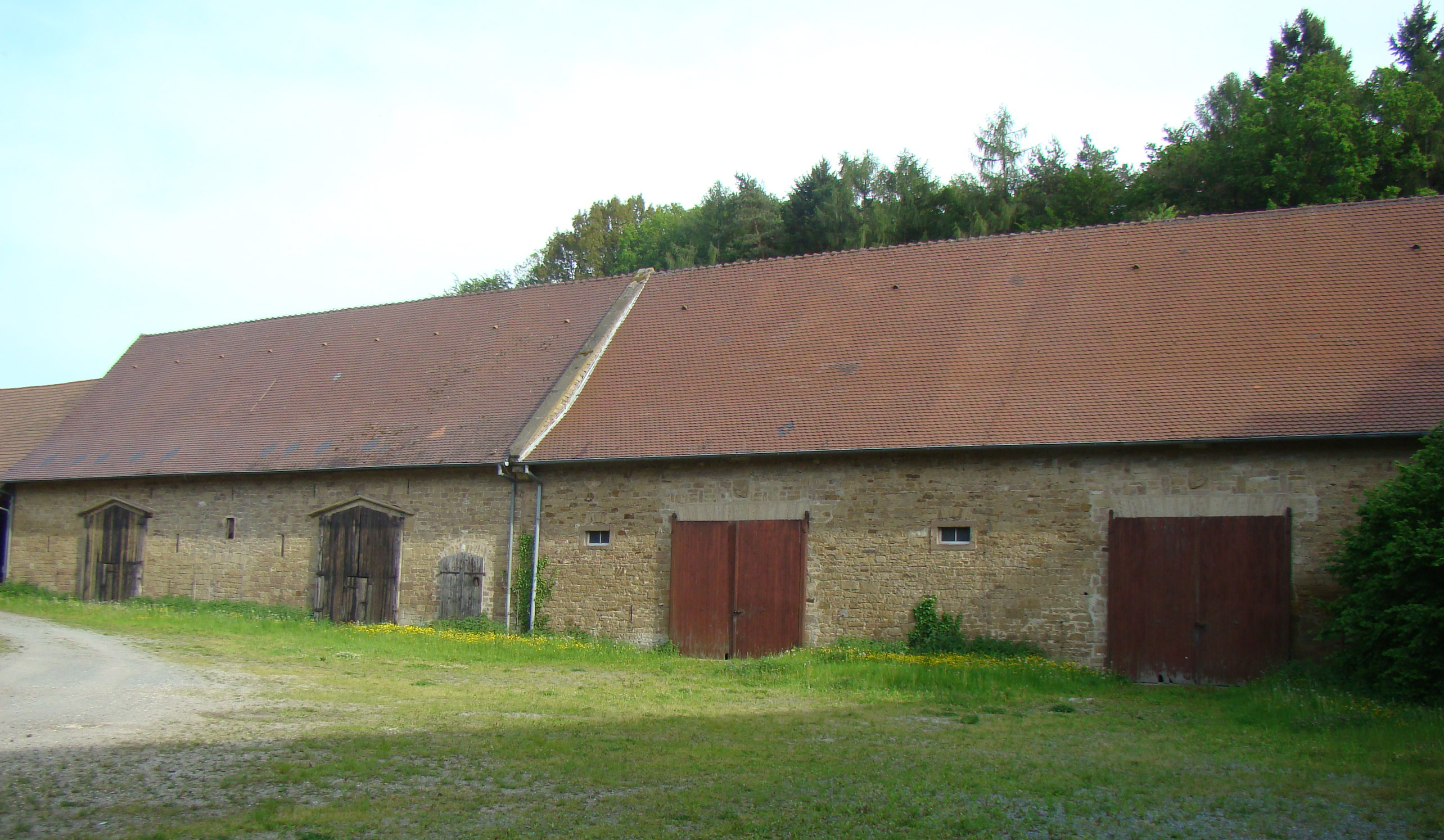

== Abbots ==
- Eberhard (1122–1146?)
- Heinrich (1146–1157?)
- Burkhard (1157–1190?)
- Siegfried (1190–1213)
- Berengar (1213–1224?)
- Deinhard (124–1245?)
- Heinrich II. (1245–1275?)
- Albert von Michelfeld (1275–1313?)
- Morhardt (1313–1325?)
- Burkard Röder (1325–1341?)
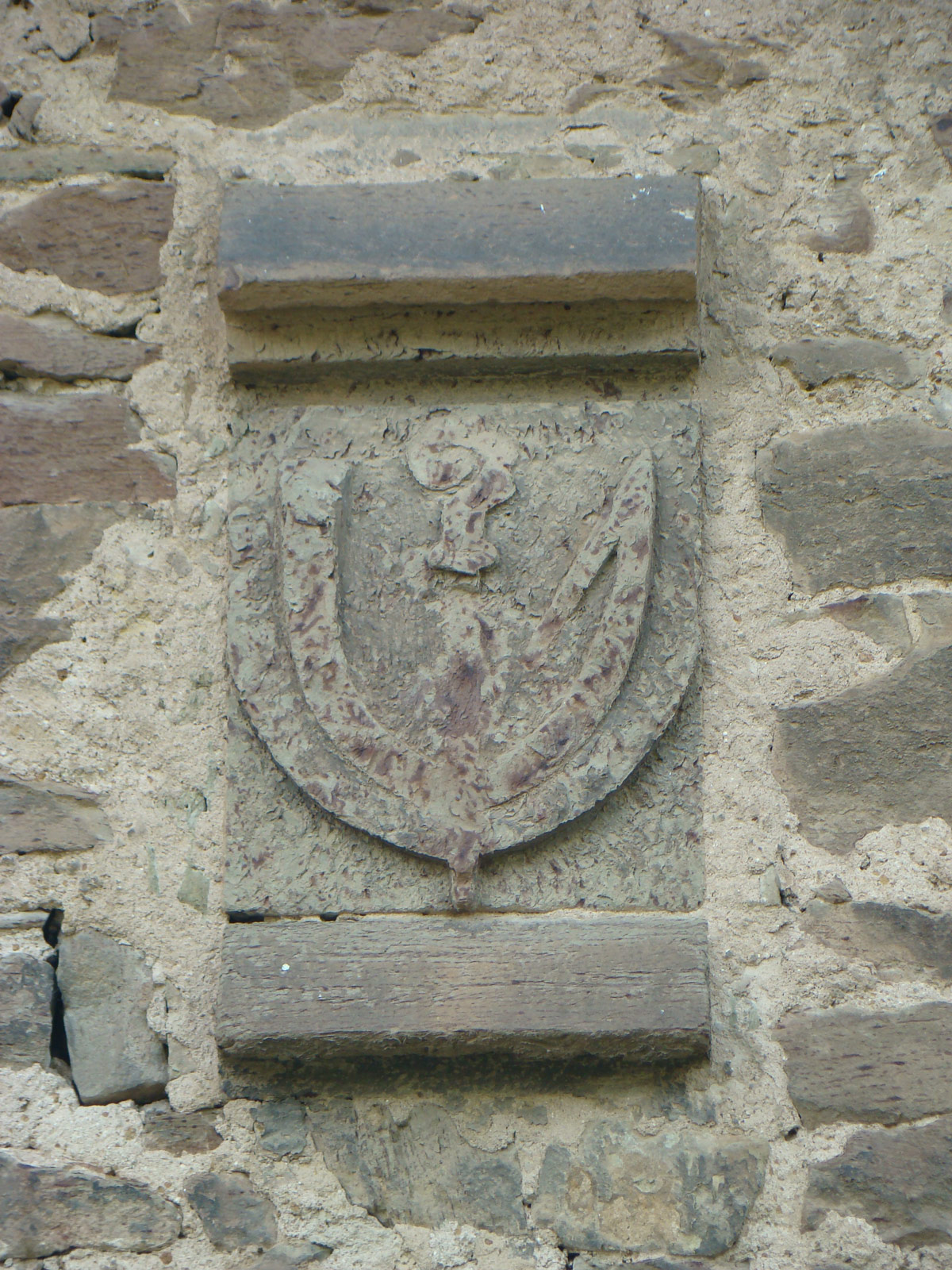
  Coat of arms of Dieter II of Angelach and Stifterhof, Odenheim
- Dietrich (1341–1365?)
- Dietrich II. von Ubstadt (1365–1377?)
- Dieter von Helmstatt (1377–1398)
- Dietrich III. von Venningen (1398–1424)
- Dieter II. von Angelach (1424–1445?)
- Eberhard von Flehingen (1445–1458?)
- Philipp von Flehingen (1458?–1468)
- Johann Schenk von Winterstetten (1468–1472)
- Ulrich von Finsterlohe (1472–1491)
- Christoph von Angelach (1491–1503)
- Melchior von Nieppenberg (1503–?)
- David Göler von Ravensburg (1463–1539)
- Andreas von Oberstein (1533–1603)
- Philipp Christoph von Sötern (1567–1652)
- Johann Heinrich von Gysenberg († 1717)
- Hermann Lothar von Auwach (1652–1722)
- Lothar Friedrich Mohr von Wald (1659–1713)
- Karl Joseph von Mirbach (1718–1798),
- Joseph Anton Siegmund von Beroldingen (1738–1816), Deacon and Provost
- Karl Eugen von Zobel von Giebelstadt (* 7. Mai 1760; † 26. April 1795)
- Emmerich Carl von Schütz zu Holzhausen († 9. July 1833; age: 67 years)
