= Söflingen Abbey =

Coordinates: 48°24′N 9°59′E

Imperial Abbey of Söflingen Reichsabtei Söflingen
- Status: Imperial Abbey of the Holy Roman Empire
- Capital: Söflingen Abbey
- Government: Theocracy
- Historical era: Early modern period
  - Lands donated by Count Hartmann IV to found abbey: 13 January 1258
  - Moved from protection of Dillingen to Ulm: 1368
  - Claimed Imp. immediacy: 1537
  - Gained seat at Imp. Diet: 1566
  - Acquired immediacy: 1773
  - Secularised to Bavaria: 1803
  - To Württemberg: 1810
Preceded by	Succeeded by
Ulm	Electorate of Bavaria
- Today part of: Germany

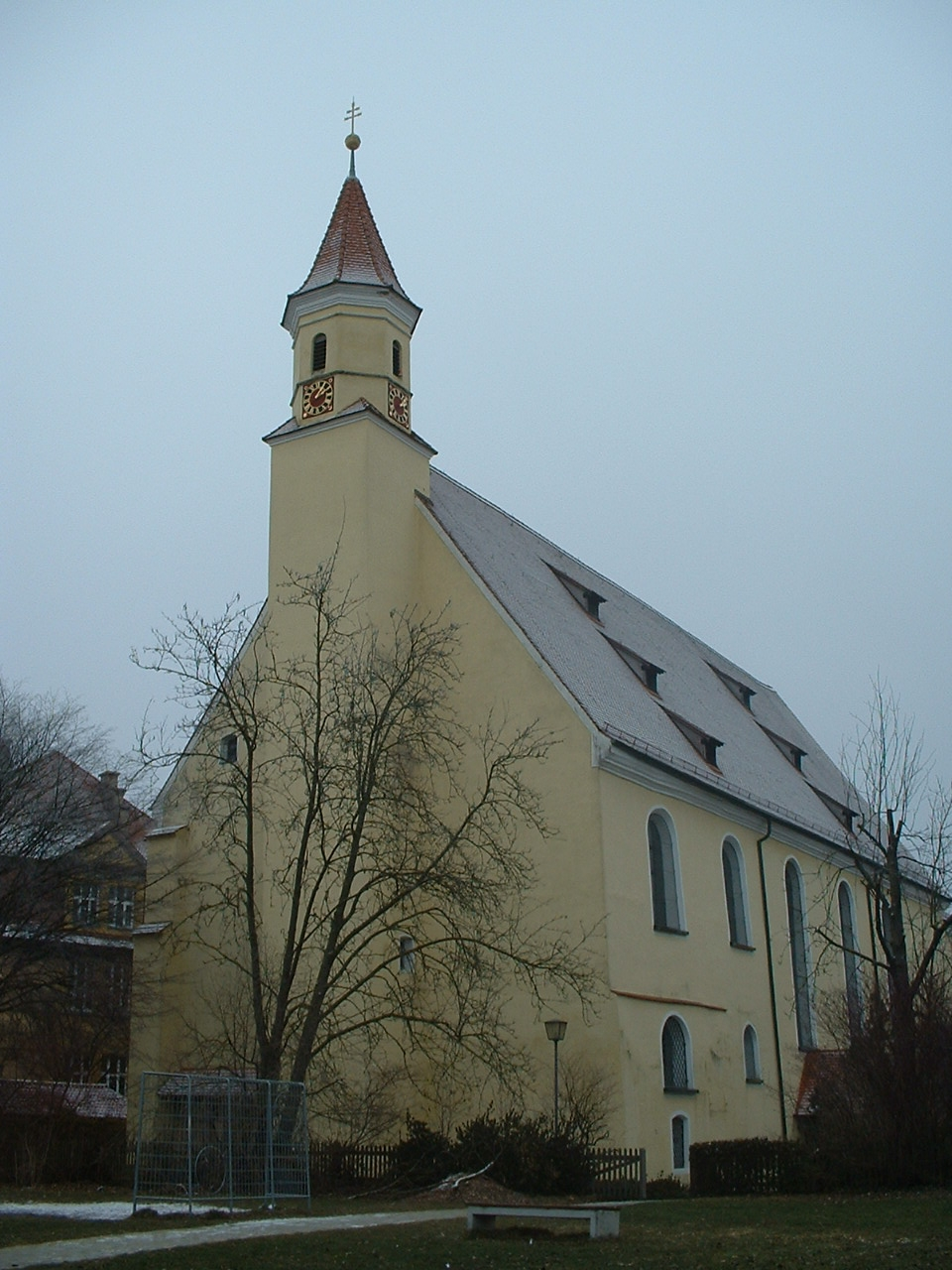
Former Abbey Church Assumption of Mary, now parish church

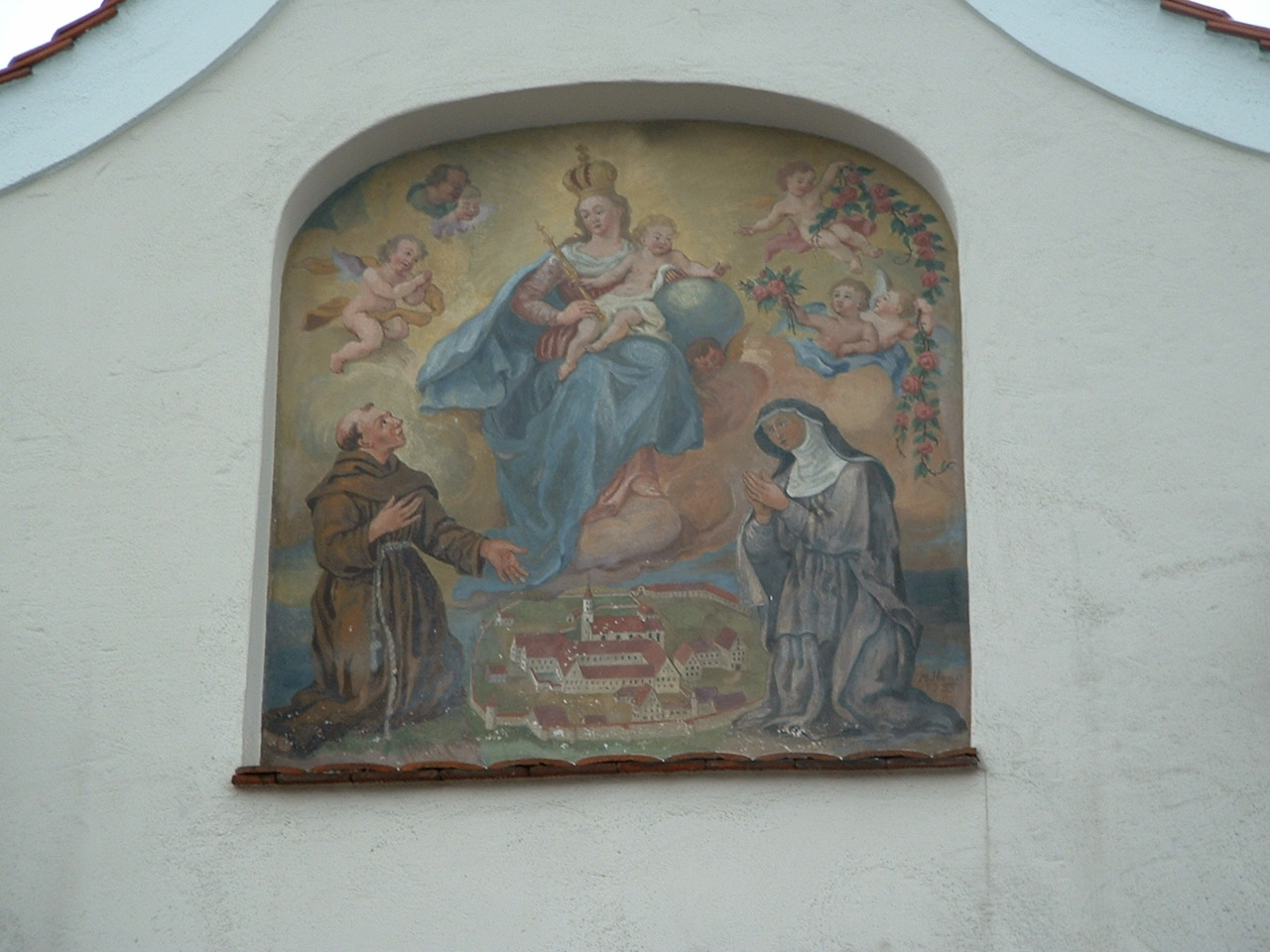
Mural on abbey gate depicting the abbey in the 18th century

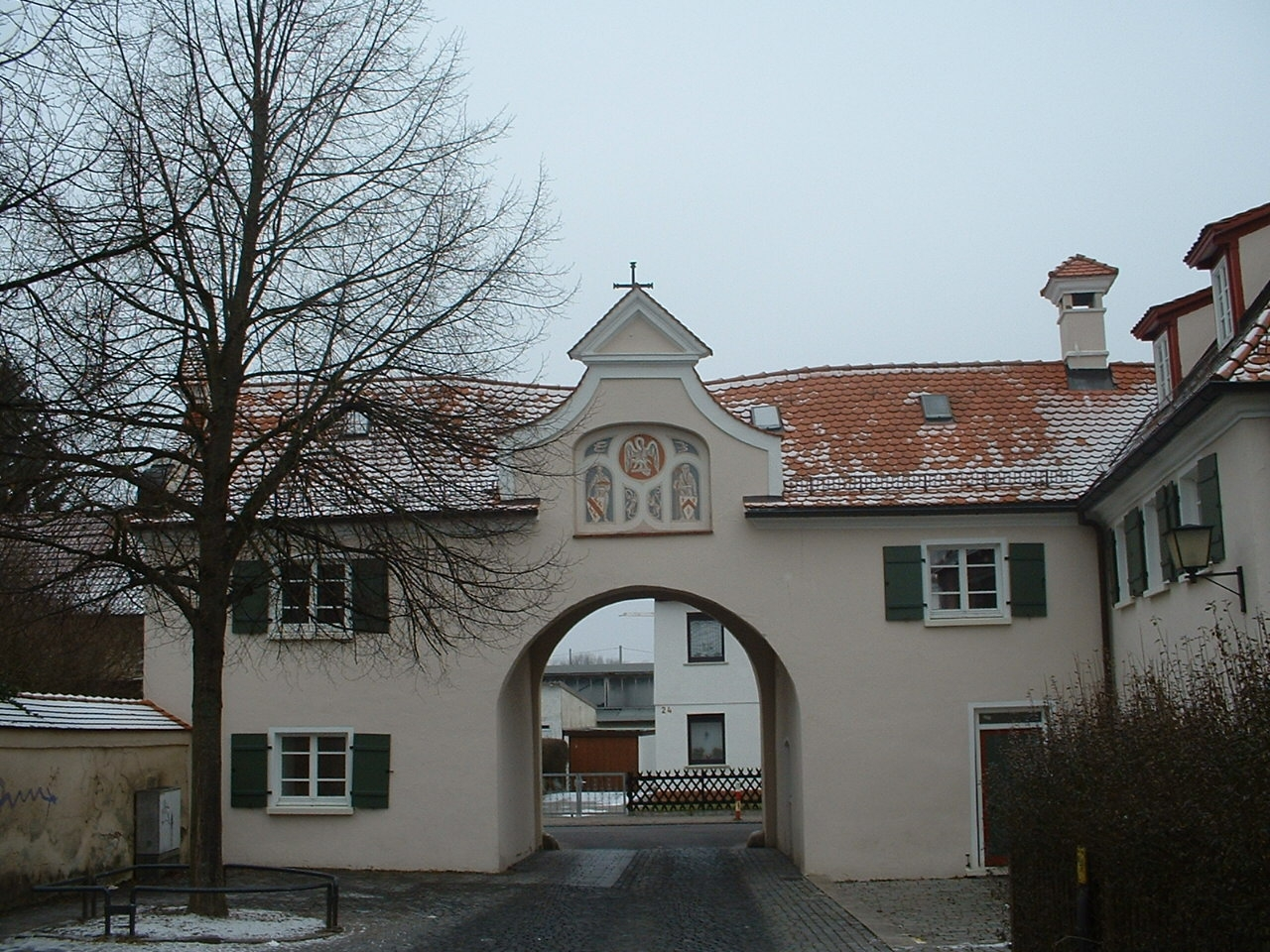
Abbey gate

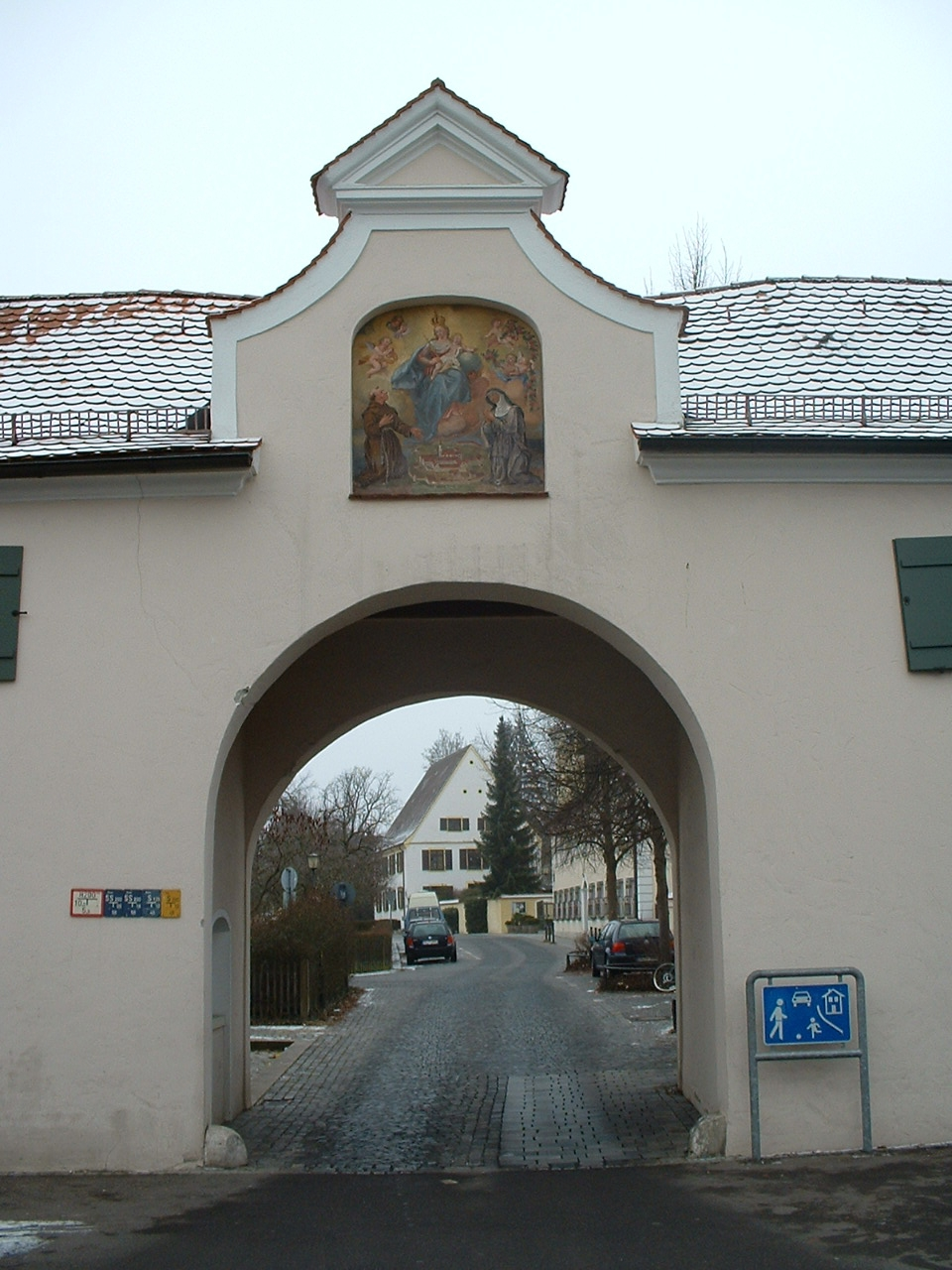
Abbey gate

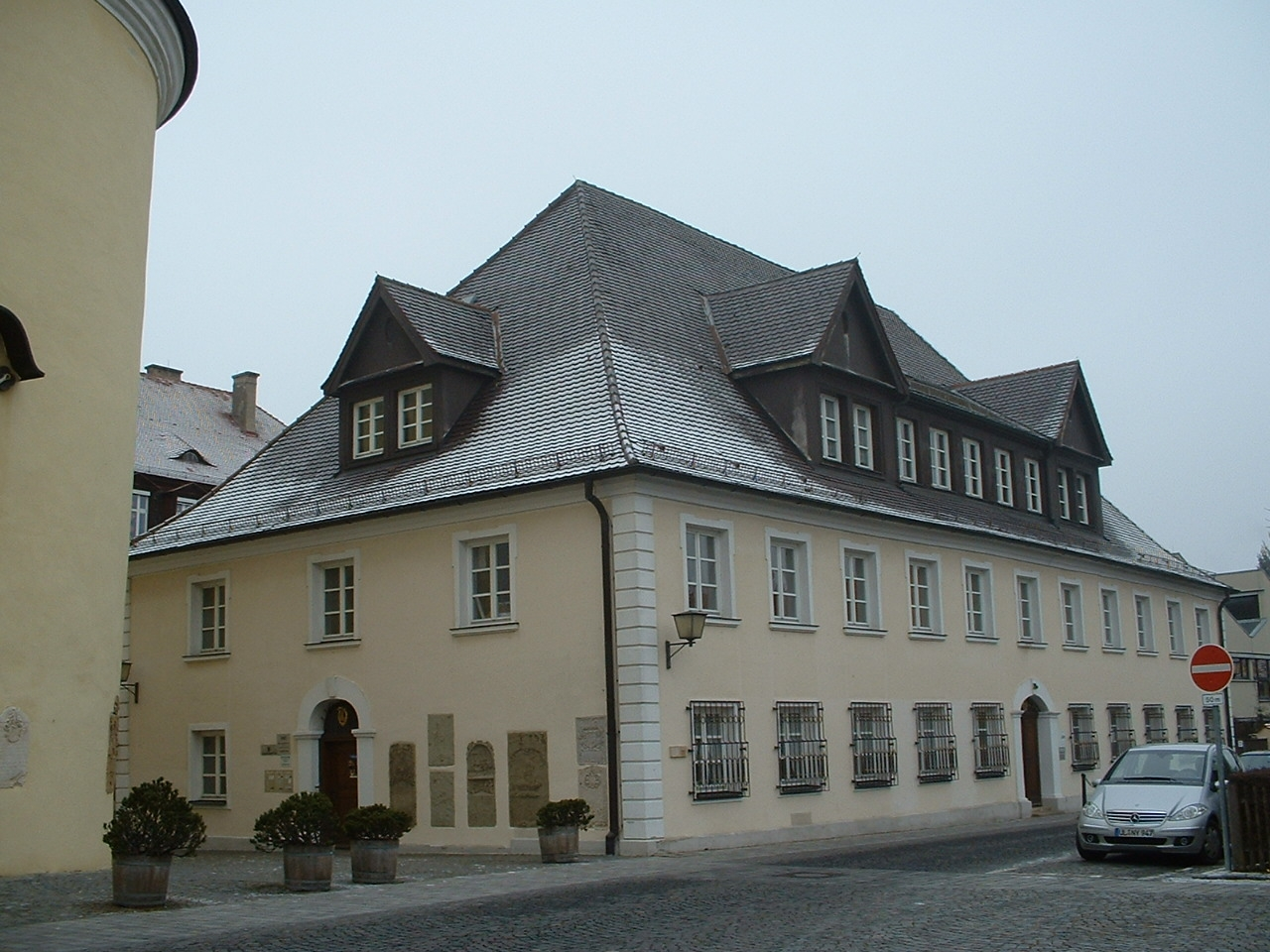
Abbey building

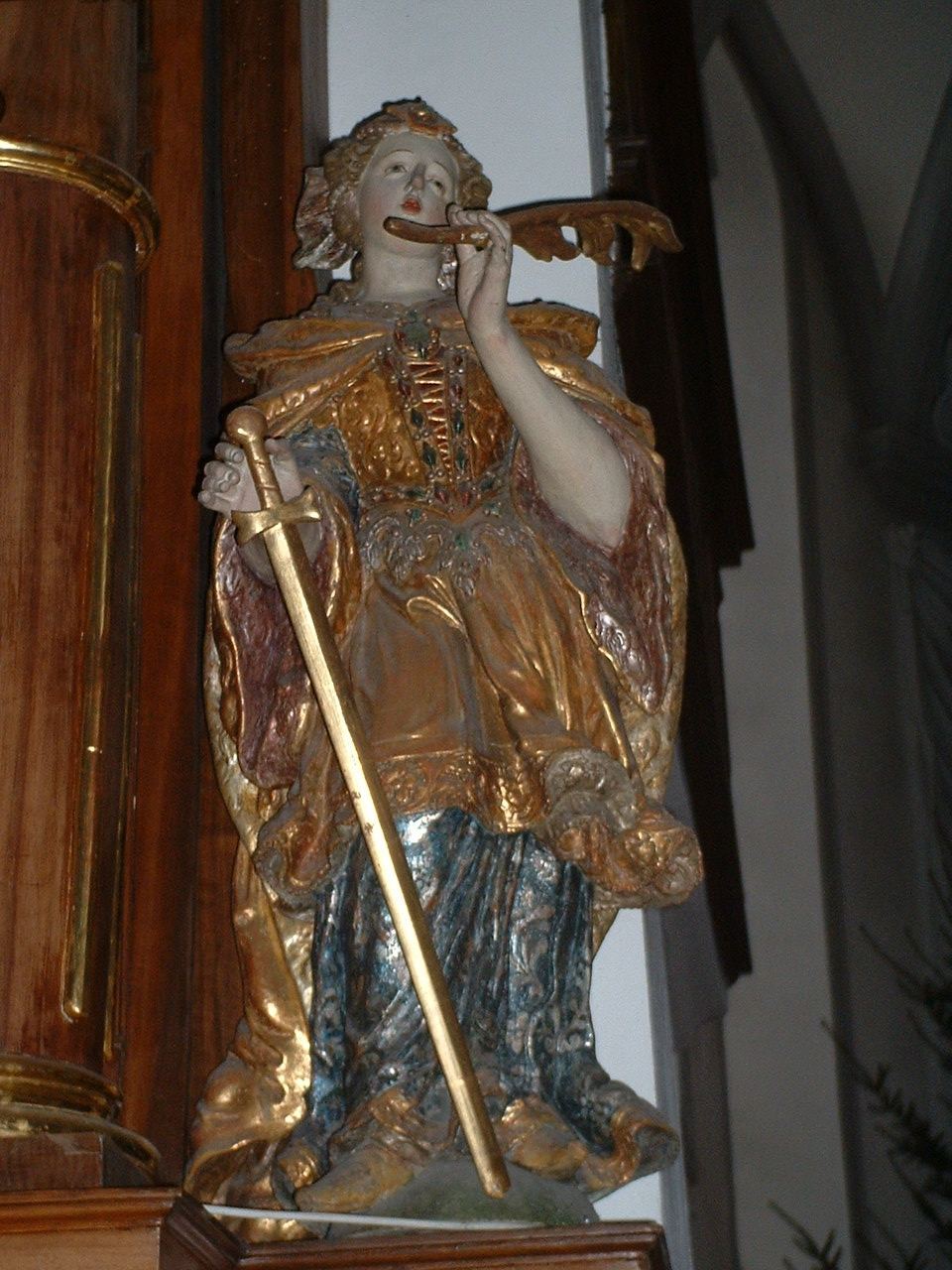
Statue in the former abbey church

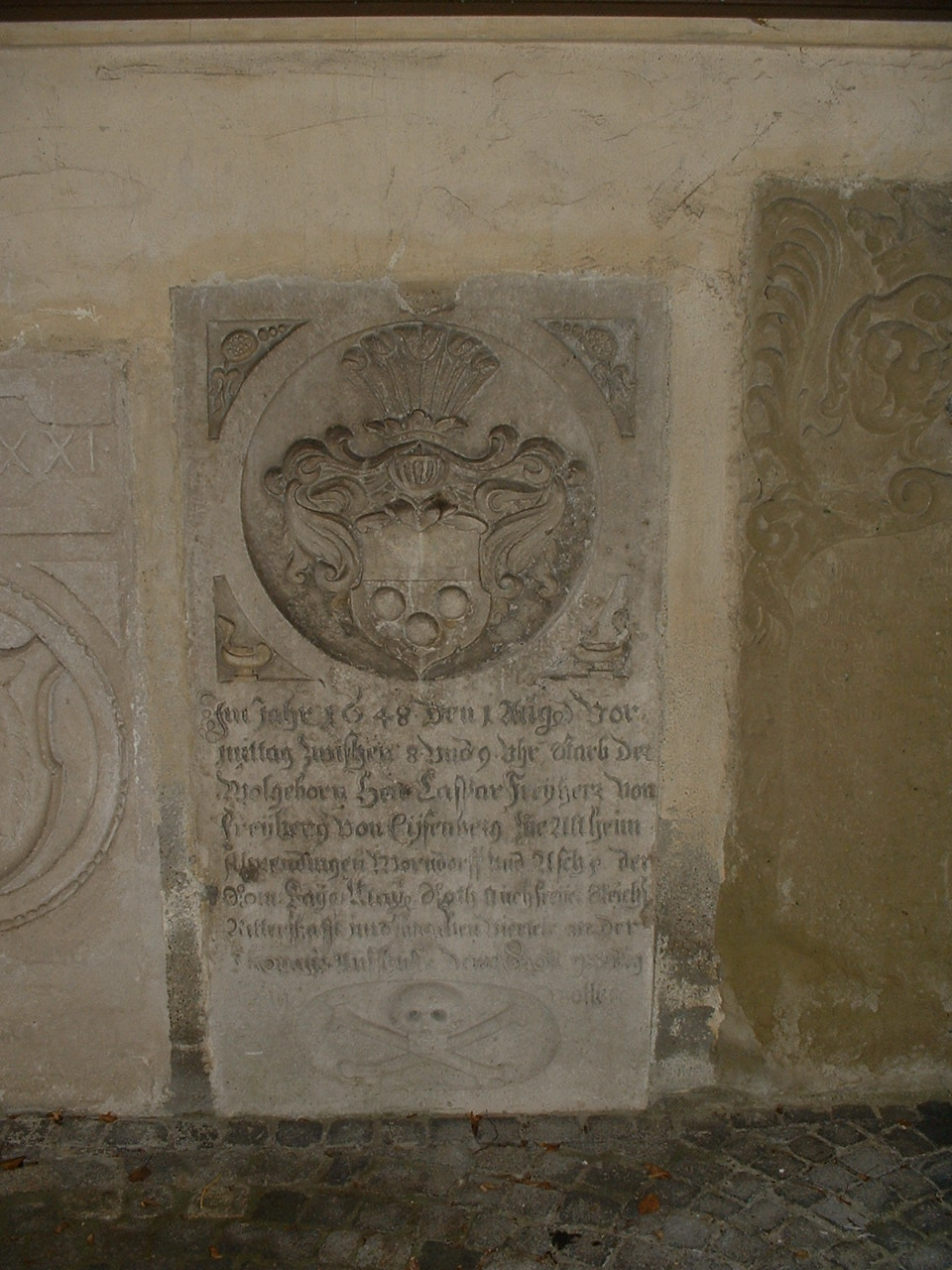
Gravestone at Söflingen Abbey

Söflingen Abbey was a nunnery of the Order of Poor Ladies, also known as the Poor Clares, the Poor Clare Sisters, the Clarisse, the Minoresses, or the Second Order of St. Francis. It was situated in the village of Söflingen, now part of Ulm in Baden-Württemberg, Germany. Being the oldest nunnery of this order in Germany, it was also its most important and most affluent.

== Foundation ==
Söflingen Abbey originated from a pre-Franciscan congregation of women that had acquired the rights over three farmsteads close to the river Danube near Ulm. It was for the first time mentioned in 1237. Soon the original location became inadequate being too small to house a growing number of nuns. Its exposed position close to the river Danube also meant that it was vulnerable during the political upheaval in the reign of Emperor Frederick II and before 1253 a decision was made to move the congregation to Söflingen. In 1254 and in 1259 Hailwigis (Hedwig) was mentioned as being the first abbess. At the same time, in 1252, nuns from Söflingen and Ulm were sent out to found a new convent at Pfullingen (also near Ulm). The relocation to Söflingen was actively assisted by Countess Willibirgis of Helfenstein, a member of the noble family of Dillingen by birth, and finally confirmed when, on 13 January 1258, Hartmann IV, Count of Dillingen, signed a charter donating lands at Sevelingen, previously owned by the counts of Dillingen, to the nuns in order to found a monastery there.

== Development ==
After initially accepting the rule for the Second Order of St Francis of Assisi as laid down by Pope Gregory IX, the nuns accepted the amendments by Pope Innocent IV only to finally follow the rules as promulgated by Pope Urban IV (1261–64). When exactly this happened is not known. However, the monastery followed this rule in the 14th century.

From its very beginning, Söflingen Abbey was under the ecclesiastical protection of the Papal See. This was confirmed several times by privileges issued by Innocent IV and Alexander IV (1254–61). The latter also relieved them from the duty to pay taxes to the papacy due to the nuns' oath of poverty. Pope Nicholas III (1277–80) widened this protection to include all the subjects and all the possessions of Söflingen Abbey. Finally, Pope John XXII (1316–34) explicitly appointed the Bishop of Constance as the official protector of the nunnery.

The task of secular protection passed at first from the Emperor Conrad IV to the Counts of Dillingen. In 1356, however, Emperor Charles IV put the abbey under the secular protection of the Free Imperial City of Ulm but confirmed many of its rights in 1368, especially the rights of advocacy.

During the Middle Ages the monastery not only owned possessions in the vicinity of Söflingen and Ulm but also had ownership over numerous villages stretching as far as Gomaringen near Tübingen and, transcending the boundaries of the Diocese of Constance, even into the Diocese of Augsburg. Since 1239 Söflingen Abbey owned vineyards in Neuffen and later acquired vineyards in Heimbach, Beutelsbach, Großheppach, Schnait (all near Weinstadt) and Stuttgart. With the acquisition of the local fortress, a process began which culminated in the whole village of Söflingen coming into the possession of the abbey around 1270. In 1392 Söflingen Abbey issued a set of laws for the village of Söflingen, an indication of how the idea of rule was changing, away from mere authority of a restricted, local area and towards authority over a wider range of territory.

In the 15th century, an echo of the mysticism of the 13th and 14th century became to characterise the spiritual life of the monastery as witnessed by the Söflinger Briefe and the Söflinger Lieder. These letters and songs document an increasing tendency towards spiritualisation and a more poetic approach of piety. A further expression of this change is the reform of the abbey which was completed with the replacement of Abbess Christina Strölin (1469–84) by the reform-oriented Abbess Elisabeth Reichner (1484–1508/13) and the rebuilding of the abbey under the latter when not only the ecclesiastical buildings were either rebuilt or renewed but also had a wall surrounding the monastery added.

During the Protestant Reformation Söflingen Abbey came into conflict with the Imperial City of Ulm which had accepted Protestantism in 1529. The abbey endeavoured to defend Catholicism and to preserve its political independence. The nuns were supported by Emperor Charles V who repeatedly prohibited Ulm to abuse its right of protection over the abbey. At the same time the emperor appointed the Bishops of Augsburg and Constance as ecclesiastical protectors. Ulm's city council, on the other hand, forbade its citizens to attend mass at the abbey. In 1537 Ulm unsuccessfully tried to install a Protestant priest in Söflingen and to introduce Protestantism between 1543 and 1548.

From this time on, Söflingen Abbey attempted to discard Ulm's protection and claimed Imperial immediacy, which they achieved only much later, and kept repelling Protestant influences. In 1566 and 1576 abbey was given a seat at the Imperial Diet.

During the Thirty Years War, the abbey suffered from the armies of the Protestant Union as well as those from the Catholic League. In 1628, Swedish troops pillaged the abbey and from 1643 until 1647 Swedish troops used the abbey as a permanent base. During these years, the nuns from the abbey sought refuge behind the protective walls of Ulm. Söflingen Abbey was to be used as headquarters for troops again in the 18th century during the War of the Spanish Succession, this time by Maximilian II Emanuel, Elector of Bavaria, in 1701 and in 1704 by the Duke of Marlborough. During the Napoleonic Wars, Michel Ney set up his headquarters at the abbey in 1805.

After the end of the Thirty Years War in 1648 it took some decades before the general recovery made itself felt at Söflingen Abbey. Under the rule of abbesses Euphrosinia Rampf (1684–1687), Kleopha Veeser (1687) and Angela Gräfin Slawata (1687–1701) the abbey church was rebuilt in early Baroque style. The building was designed and erected under the supervision of architect Kaspar Feichtmayr from Wessobrunn.

In the 18th century Söflingen Abbey owned the villages of Söflingen, Harthausen and Schaffelkingen (now all part of the city of Ulm) as well as parts of the villages of Bettingen, Burlafingen and Eckingen. In several other villages mostly belonging to the Imperial City of Ulm, the abbey had the right to levy certain taxes and was in possession of estates there. In 1773 the abbey reached a legal settlement with the city of Ulm whereby it relinquished its rights on the villages of Mähringen, Lehr, Jungingen, Breitingen, Holzkirch, Lonsee, Langenau, Weidenstetten, Söglingen and Bermaringen. In exchange for this Ulm, which had been Protestant since the first half of the 16th century, gave up its protection, territorial and legal rights over Söflingen Abbey. At the same time, the abbey finally achieved Imperial immediacy with the abbess receiving a seat and voting rights in the Swabian Circle and the Reichstag.

== Dissolution ==
Following the secularisation of ecclesiastical states the territory and property of Söflingen Abbey with its 4000 subjects came under Bavarian rule in 1803. Together with the nuns the last abbess, Bonaventura Seelinger, chose to continue the monastic life but was ejected from the monastery in 1809 when the buildings were used as an army hospital and later as a Royal Bavarian court of law only to be allowed to briefly return in 1810 when, following a border treaty between Württemberg and Bavaria in 1810, the area around Söflingen, together with Ulm, came under the rule of the recently founded Kingdom of Württemberg. Monastic life came to an end in 1814 when the buildings were again used as a hospital, this time for the Württemberg army. The abbey's possessions were largely sold off into private hands. Most of the monastic buildings were demolished and the abbey church became the parish church of Söflingen.

== See also ==
- Imperial Abbey
- Order of Poor Ladies
- Ulm
- Upper Swabia
