= Princely abbeys and imperial abbeys of the Holy Roman Empire =

Religious institutions in the Holy Roman Empire with imperial immediacy

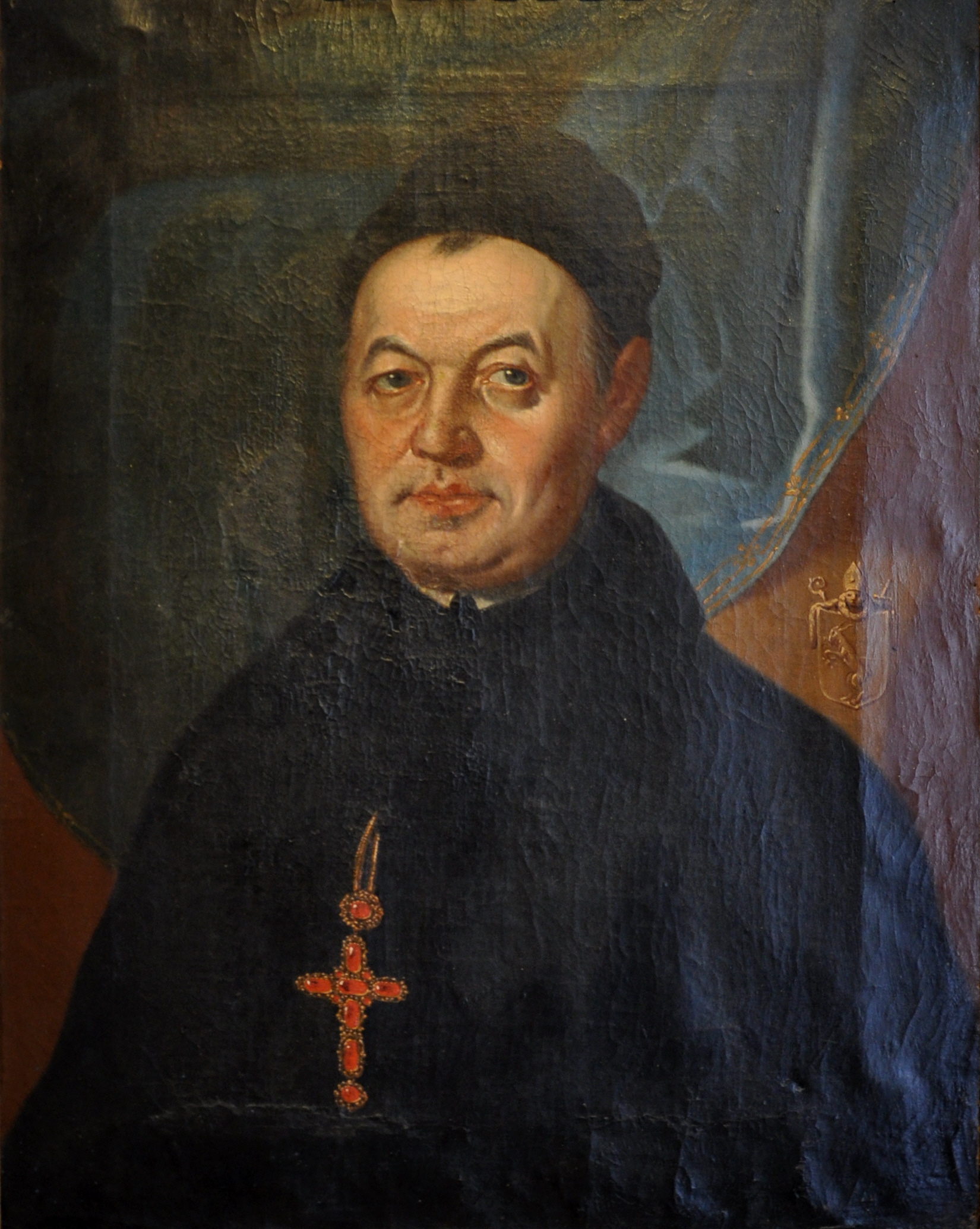
Anselm Rittler, last Imperial abbot of Weingarten (1784–1804). Starting in 1555, the abbots of Weingarten cast the collective vote of the Imperial abbots of Swabia at the Imperial Diet.

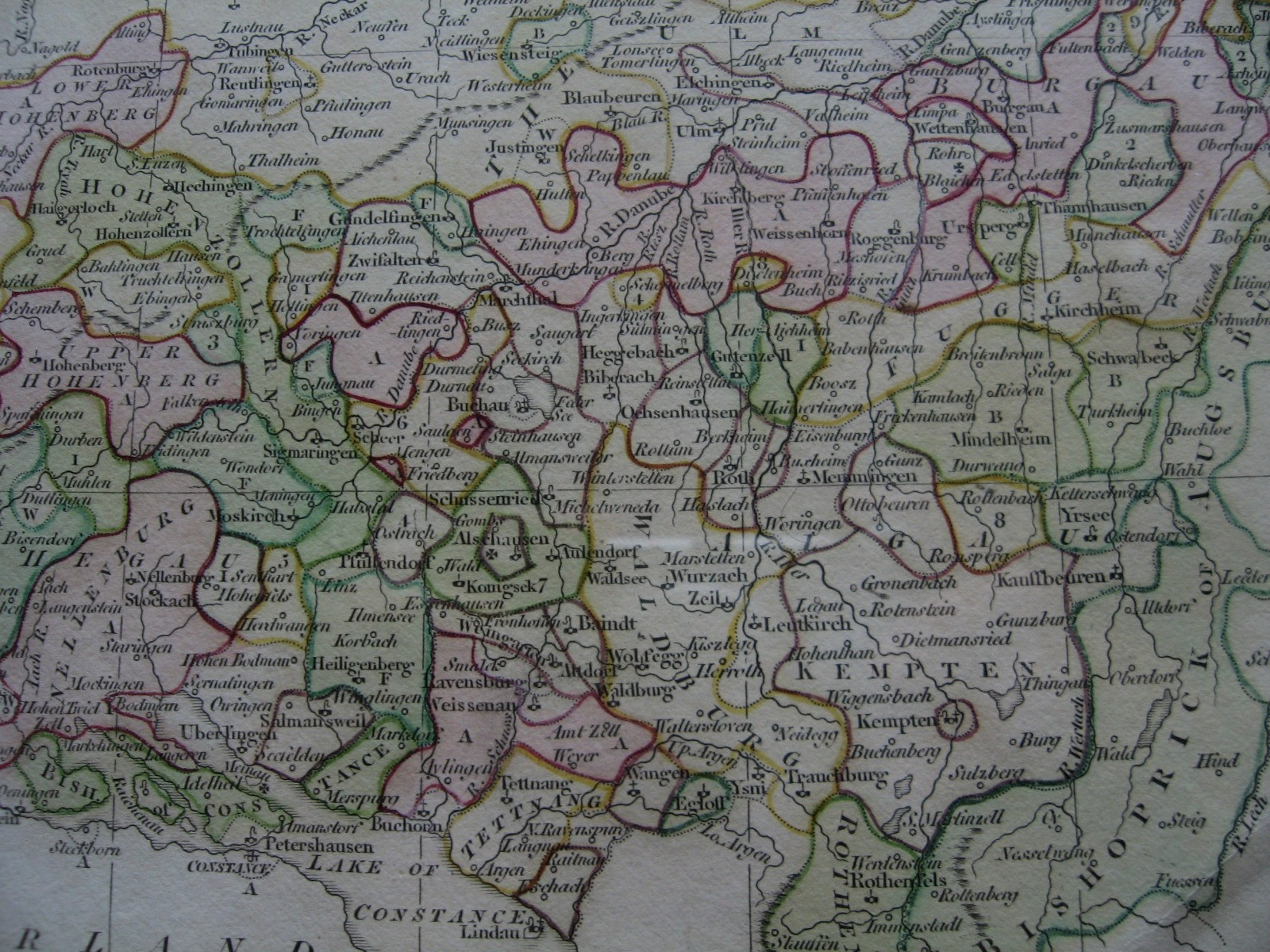
Imperial abbeys in Swabia

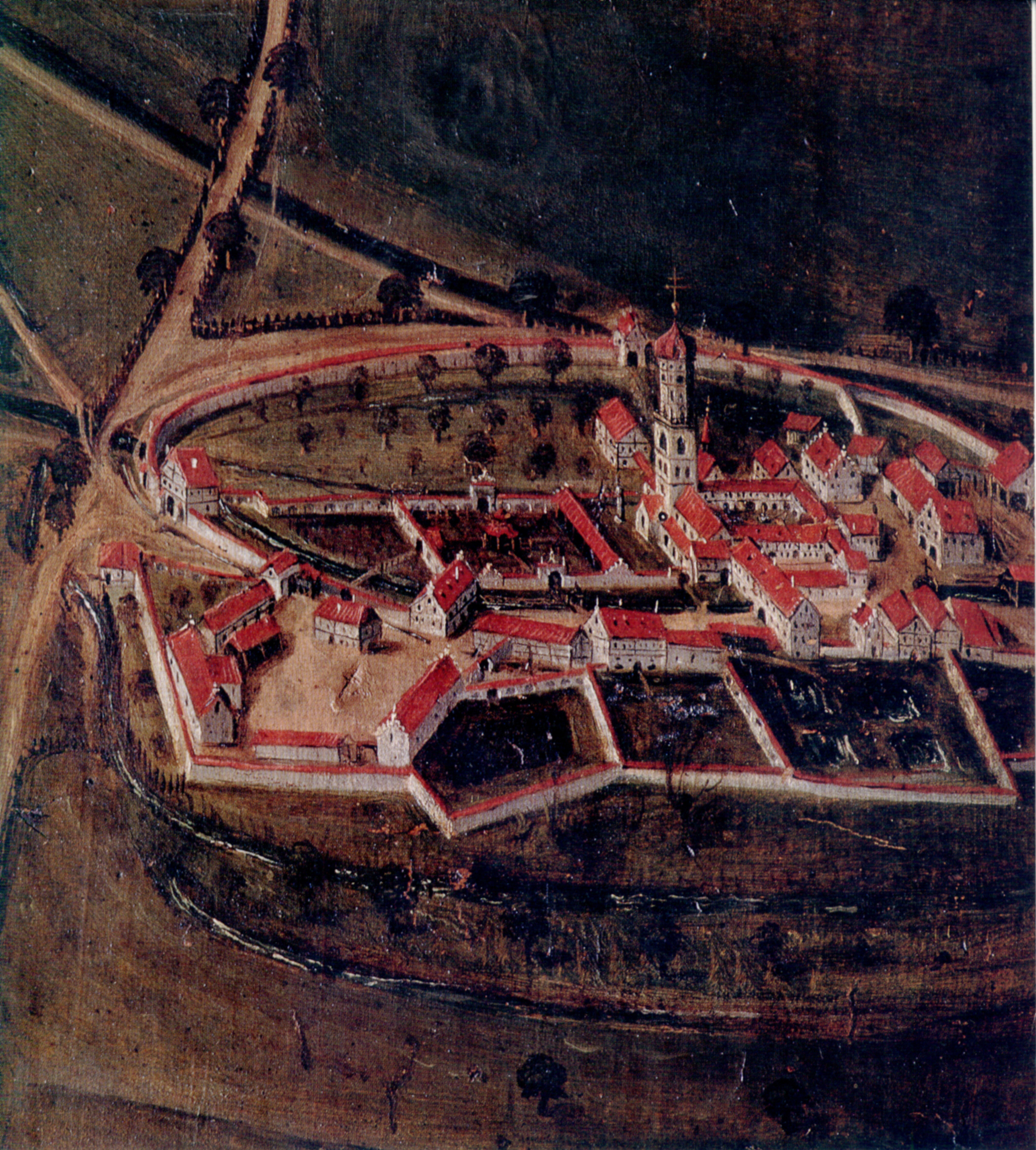
Weissenau abbey, c. 1625

Princely abbeys (German: Fürstabtei, Fürststift) and Imperial abbeys (German: Reichsabtei, Reichskloster, Reichsstift, Reichsgotthaus) were religious establishments within the Holy Roman Empire which enjoyed the status of imperial immediacy (Reichsunmittelbarkeit) and therefore were answerable directly to the Emperor. The possession of imperial immediacy came with a unique form of territorial authority known as Landeshoheit, which carried with it nearly all the attributes of sovereignty.

== Princely abbeys and imperial abbeys ==
The distinction between a princely abbey and an imperial abbey was related to the status of the abbot: while both prince-abbots and the more numerous imperial abbots sat on the ecclesiastical bench of the College of ruling princes of the Imperial Diet, prince-abbots cast an individual vote while imperial abbots cast only a curial (collective) vote alongside his or her fellow imperial abbots and abbesses. Eight princely abbeys (including similar status priories) and roughly 40 imperial abbeys survived up to the mass secularisation of 1802–03 when they were all secularized.

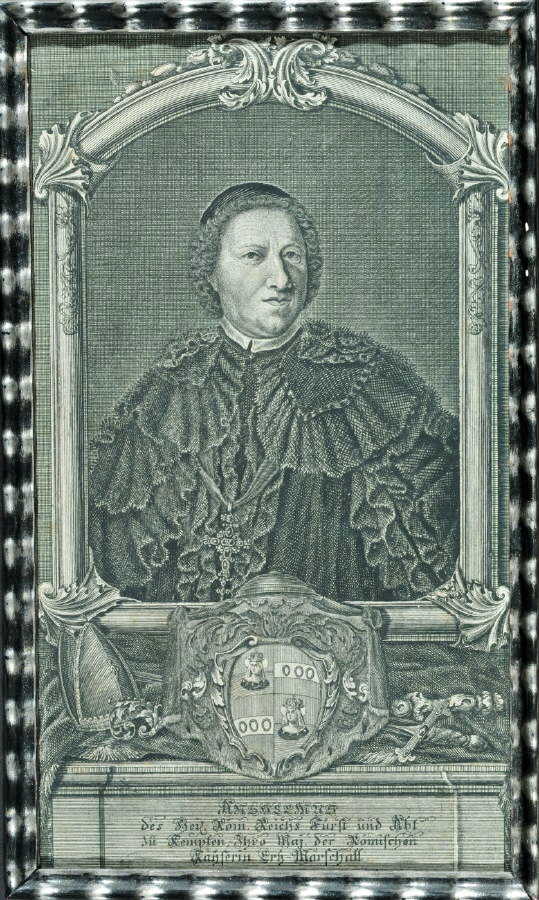
An 18th-century prince-abbot: Anselm Reichlin von Meldegg of Kempten

The head of an Imperial abbey was generally an Imperial abbot (Reichsabt) or Imperial abbess (Reichsäbtissin). The head of a Reichspropstei—an Imperial provostry or priory—was generally a Reichspropst. Collectively, Imperial abbots, provosts and priors were formally known as Reichsprälaten (Imperial Prelates). A small number of the larger and most prestigious establishments had the rank of princely abbeys (Fürstsabtei), and were headed by a prince-abbot or a prince-provost (Fürstabt, Fürstpropst), with status comparable to that of Prince-Bishops. Most however were imperial prelates and as such participated in a single collective vote in the Imperial Diet as members of the Bench of Prelates, later (1575) divided into the Swabian College of Imperial Prelates and the Rhenish College of Imperial Prelates. Despite their difference of status within the Imperial Diet, both the Imperial Prelates and the Prince-Abbots exercised the same degree of authority over their principality.

Some abbeys, particularly in Switzerland, gained the status of princely abbeys (Fürstsabtei) during the Middle Ages or later but they either did not have a territory over which they ruled or they lost that territory after a short while. This was the case with Kreuzlingen, Allerheiligen, Einsiedeln, Muri and Saint-Maurice abbeys. One major exception was the large and powerful Abbey of St. Gall which remained independent up to its dissolution during the Napoleonic period, despite the fact that, as a Swiss abbey, it had stopped taking part in the Imperial Diet and other institutions of the Holy Roman Empire once the independence of the Swiss Confederacy was recognized in 1648. Elsewhere, the Prince-Abbot of St. Blaise's Abbey in the Black Forest held that title, not on account of the status of the abbey, which was not immediate, but because it was conferred on him by the abbey's ownership of the immediate County of Bonndorf (later annexed to the Principality of Heitersheim of the Knights of Malta).

== Lists of Imperial abbeys ==
=== List of Imperial abbeys with seat and voice at the Imperial Diet of 1792 ===
The following list includes the Imperial abbeys which had seat and voice at the Imperial Diet of 1792. They, along with the two Teutonic Order commanderies whose commanders ranked as prelates, are listed according to their voting order on the two Benches of Prelates of the Diet. Not shown are the abbeys of Stablo, Kempten and Corvey, whose abbots had princely status and sat on the Ecclesiastical Bench of the College of Ruling Princes. For additional information on individual abbeys, see: List A: Imperial abbeys named in the Matrikel below this list.

==== Bench of Swabian Prelates ====
1. Salem
2. Weingarten
3. Ochsenhausen
4. Elchingen
5. Irsee
6. Ursberg
7. Kaisheim
8. Roggenburg
9. Roth (Mönchroth)
10. Weissenau
11. Schussenried
12. Marchthal
13. Petershausen
14. Wettenhausen
15. Zwiefalten
16. Gengenbach
17. Neresheim
18. Heggbach
19. Gutenzell
20. Rottenmünster
21. Baindt
22. Söflingen
23. St. George's at Isny

==== Bench of Rhineland Prelates ====
1. Kaisheim (Swabian Bench after 1756)
2. Commandery Koblenz (Teutonic Order)
3. Commanderies Alsace and Burgundy (Teutonic Order)
4. Odenheim and Bruchsal
5. Werden
6. St. Ulrich's and St Afra's
7. St. George's at Isny (Swabian Bench after 1782)
8. St. Kornelimünster
9. St. Emmeram's
10. Essen
11. Buchau
12. Quedlinburg
13. Herford
14. Gernrode
15. Niedermünster
16. Obermünster
17. Burtscheid
18. Gandersheim
19. Thorn

=== List A: Imperial abbeys named in the Matrikel of 1521 ===
The religious houses listed here as List A are those named in the Matrikel, or lists of those eligible to vote in the Imperial Diet, including those whose votes were collective rather than individual. Three of these lists survive and are accessible, from 1521, 1755 (or thereabouts) and 1792.

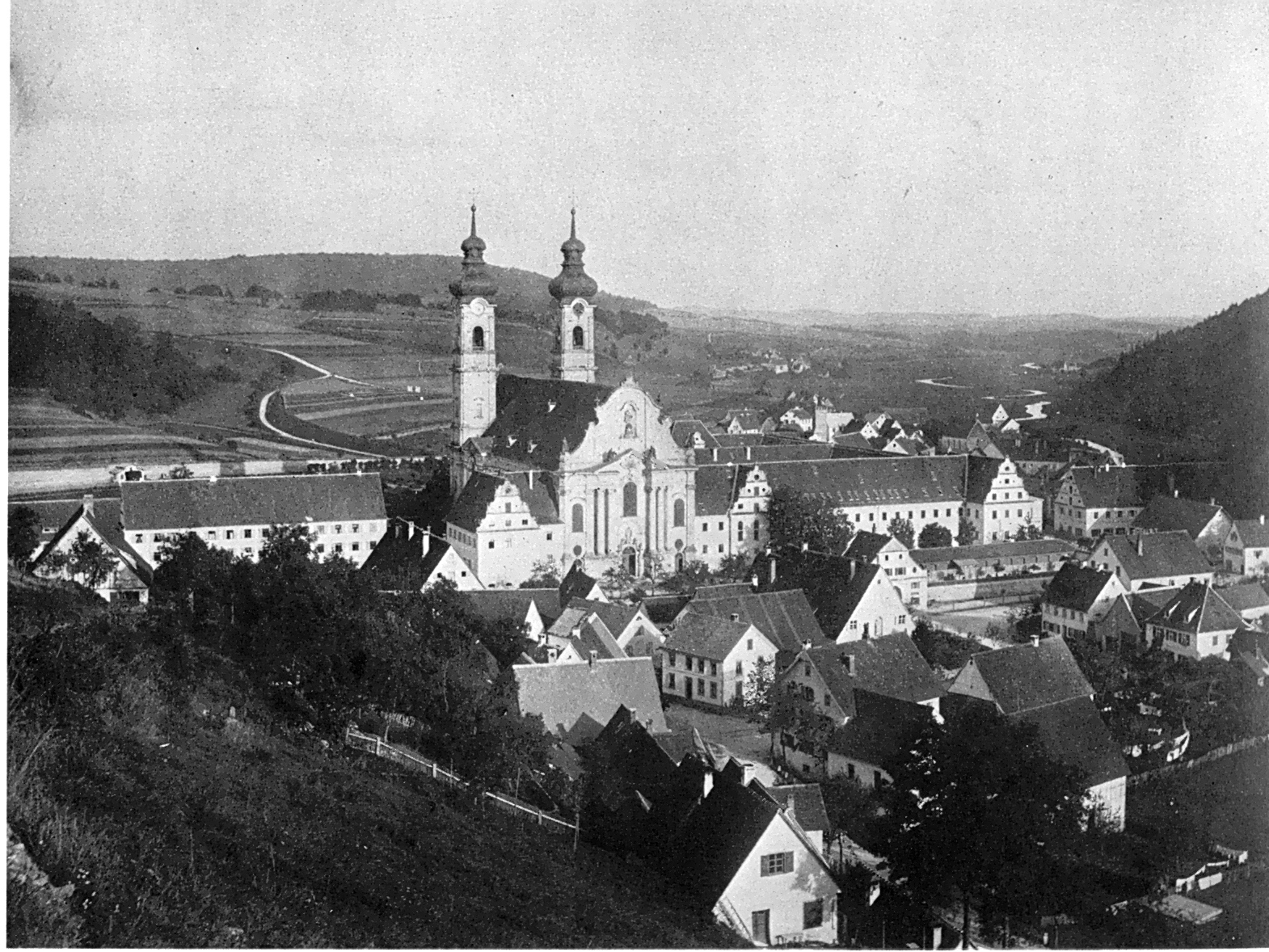
The former Imperial abbey of Zwiefalten in 1890. Most Imperial abbeys belonged to the Benedictine order.

This list includes the Principalities, Imperial abbeys (Reichsabteien and -klöster), Imperial colleges (Reichsstifte), Imperial provostries or priories (Reichspropsteien) and the single Imperial charterhouse (Reichskartause).

The word "Stift", meaning a collegiate foundation or canonry, possibly belonging to a variety of different orders or to none at all, and either with or without rules and vows, for either men ("Herrenstift") or for women (Frauenstift), has been left untranslated, except when it specifically refers to the chapter of a church.

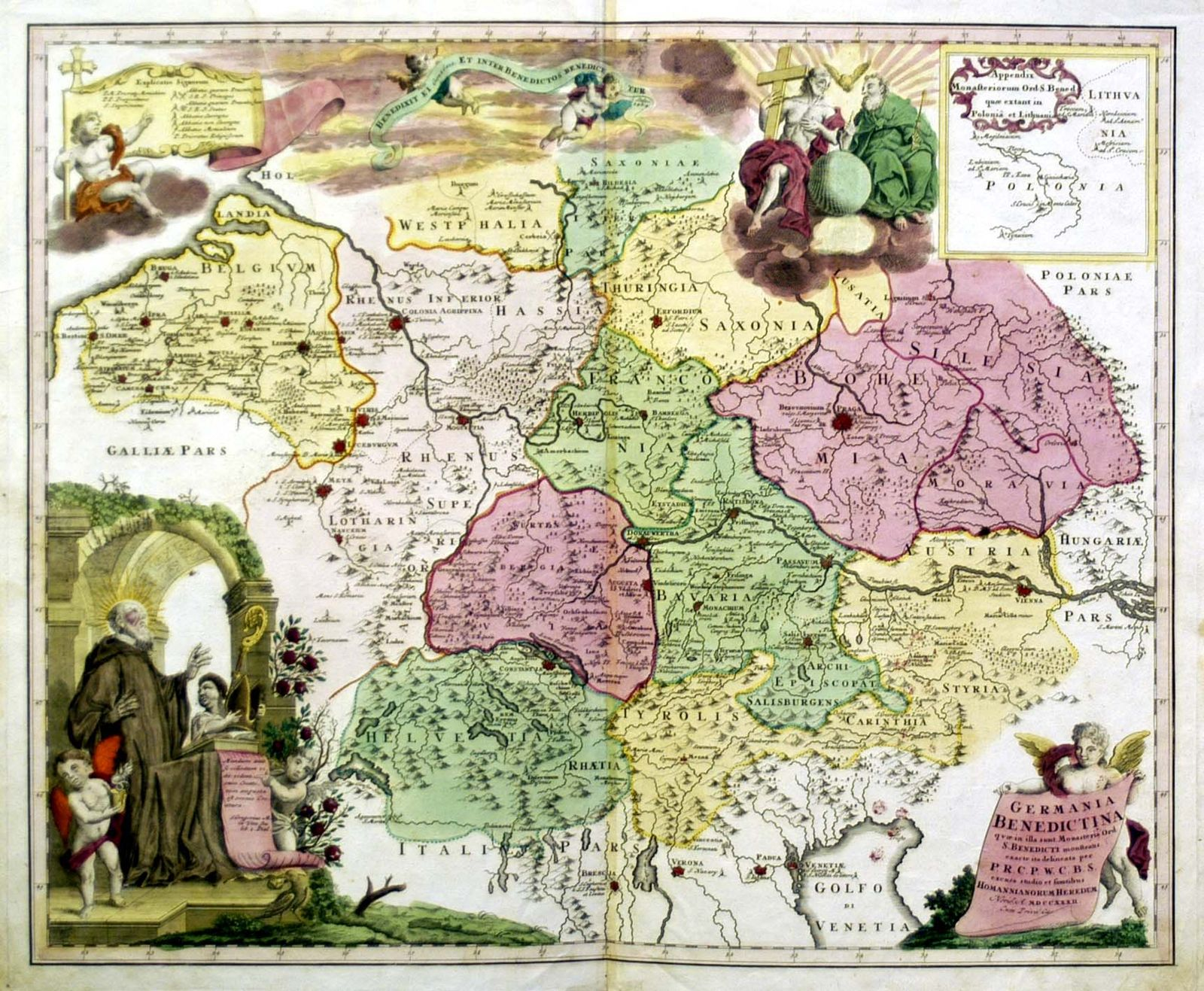
Germania Benedictina

Some of the imperial abbeys were dissolved during the Reformation; others were absorbed into other territories at various times in the general course of political life. Those in Alsace and Switzerland passed out of the Empire in 1648, when Alsace was ceded to France and Switzerland became independent. The great majority of these religious bodies however were secularized during the brief period that included the French Revolution, the Napoleonic Wars, and their aftermath, especially as a result of the German mediatization (Reichsdeputationshauptschluss) of February 1803. Any that survived lost their Imperial status when the Holy Roman Empire was wound up in 1806.

==== Abbreviations ====
- Description and Imperial status column:
  - RA stands for Reichsabtei (Imperial abbey)
  - RF stands for "Reichsfürstentum" (Princely Abbey)
  - RP stands for "Reichspropstei" (Imperial provostry)
- Lost imm. column:
  - imm. Imperial immediacy
  - Sec. secularised
  - Med. mediatised
  - Switz. Switzerland
  - Hel. Helvetic Republic
- College column:
  - RC stands for "Rhenish College"
  - SC stands for "Swabian College"
  - RF stands for "Reichsfürst", i.e., the head of the house in question had the status of prince with an individual seat and voice in the Imperial Diet; there were ten of those (Fulda, Kempten, Ellwangen, Murbach-Lüders, Berchtesgaden, Weissenburg, Prüm, Stablo-Malmedy, Corvey and St. Gall).

CoA	Religious house	Location	Founded	Imm.	Lost imm.	To...	Description and status	College
	Baindt Abbey	Baden-Württemberg	1240	1376	1802 Sec.	Count of Aspremont-Lynden	Cistercian nunnery; reichsunmittelbar but remained subordinate to Salem Abbey. RA	SC
	Berchtesgaden Provostry	Bavaria	1102	1194	1803 Sec.	Electorate of Salzburg	Augustinian Canons. Fürstpropstei ("Prince-Provostry"). RF from 1380 or 1559	RF
	Buchau Abbey	Baden-Württemberg	c. 700	1347	1803 Sec.	County of Thurn und Taxis	Frauenstift. RA. RF	RC
	Burtscheid Abbey	North Rhine-Westphalia (Aachen)	997	1220	1802 Sec.	Roer	Benedictine monastery; from 1220/21 Cistercian nunnery. RF	RC
	Buxheim Charterhouse	Bavaria	c. 1100	1548	1802/03 Sec.	County of Ostein	Canons; Carthusians from 1402 (the only Reichskartause). RP	SC and RC
	Comburg	Baden-Württemberg (Schwäbisch Hall)	1070s	before 15th century	1587 Med.	Duchy of Württemberg	Benedictine monastery, later Herrenstift. Mediatised by Württemberg 1587; secularised 1803. RA	SC
	Corvey Abbey	North Rhine-Westphalia (Höxter)	c. 820	c. 1150	1803 Sec.	Principality of Nassau-Orange-Fulda	Benedictine monastery. RA; RF no later than 1582	RF
	Disentis Abbey	Switzerland	c. 720	early 8th century	1798 Hel.	Three Leagues	Benedictine monastery; secularised 1798; re-established 1803. RA	SC
	Echternach Abbey	Luxembourg	700	751	1794 Sec.	Forêts	Benedictine monastery. Mediatised by Austria sometime after 1521 RA	
	Einsiedeln Abbey	Switzerland	934	965	1648 Switz.	Canton of Schwyz	Benedictine monastery. Ceased to be part of the HRE in 1648; secularised 1798; re-established 1803. RA	
	Elchingen Abbey	Bavaria	1128	1485	1802 Sec.	Electorate of Bavaria	Benedictine monastery. RA	SC
	Ellwangen Abbey	Baden-Württemberg	c. 764	1011	1802 Sec.	Duchy of Württemberg	Benedictine monastery; Fürstpropstei ("Prince-Provostry"). Possibly founded as early as 732. RF	RF
	Essen Abbey	North Rhine-Westphalia	c. 845	betw. 874 and 947	1803 Sec.	Kingdom of Prussia	Frauenstift. RA	RC
	Frauenchiemsee Abbey (aka Frauenwörth)	Bavaria	782	782	1803 Sec.	Electorate of Bavaria	Benedictine nunnery. RA	SC
	Fraumünster Abbey	Switzerland (Zürich)	853	1218	1524 Sec.	Canton of Zurich	Benedictine nunnery. RA	SC
	Fürstenfeld Abbey	Bavaria (Fürstenfeldbruck)	1258	Uncertain	1803 Sec.	Electorate of Bavaria	Cistercian monastery. RA	SC
	Fulda Abbey	Hesse	744	765	1802 Sec.	Principality of Nassau-Orange-Fulda	Benedictine monastery. RF	RF
	Gandersheim Abbey	Lower Saxony	852	919 (de facto 877)	1810 Sec.	Principality of Brunswick-Wolfenbüttel	Frauenstift. The abbey asserted Imperial immediacy but owned no reichsunmittelbar estates, and was claimed until 1709 by Brunswick-Wolfenbüttel. RA	RC
	Gengenbach Abbey	Baden-Württemberg	727–35	9th century	1803 Sec.	Margraviate of Baden	Benedictine monastery. RA	SC
	Gernrode Abbey	Saxony-Anhalt	959	961	1728 Med.	Principality of Anhalt-Dessau	Frauenstift. De facto sovereignty lost to Anhalt in 1570. RA	RC
	Göss Abbey	Austria (Leoben)	1004	1020	1782 Sec.	Habsburg monarchy	Benedictine nunnery. RA	SC
	Gutenzell Abbey	Baden-Württemberg	1237	1417	1803 Sec.	County of Toerring	Cistercian nunnery. RA	SC
	Heggbach Abbey	Baden-Württemberg (Maselheim)	1231	1429	1803 Sec.	County of Bassenheim	Beguines; Cistercian nunnery from 1248. RA	SC
	Helmarshausen Abbey	Hesse (Bad Karlshafen)	997	997	1538 Sec.	Landgraviate of Hesse	Benedictine monastery. RA	SC
	Herford Abbey	North Rhine-Westphalia	832	1147	1802 Sec.	County of Ravensberg	Frauenstift. Lutheran from 1533. RA	RC
	Herrenalb Abbey	Baden-Württemberg	1147/48	1275	1497 Med.	Margraviate of Baden; Duchy of Württemberg	Cistercian monastery. RA	SC
	Hersfeld Abbey	Hesse	736–42	775	1648 Sec.	Landgraviate of Hesse-Kassel	Benedictine monastery. De facto mediatised to Hesse-Kassel from 1606. RA	RC
	Irsee Abbey	Bavaria	1186	1695	1802 Sec.	Electorate of Bavaria	Benedictine monastery. RA	SC
	Kaisheim Abbey (sometimes Kaisersheim Abbey)	Bavaria	1135	1346	1802 Sec.	Electorate of Bavaria	Cistercian monastery. Immediacy was not recognised by the Wittelsbachs, who were the Vögte; a legal agreement was reached with their successors in 1656, confirming Reichsfreiheit. RA	SC and RC
	Kaufungen Abbey	Hesse (Kassel)	1017	1089	1527 Med.	Hessian Knighthood	Benedictine nunnery. Given to the Hessische Ritterschaft 1532; still extant as a private foundation. RA	
	Kempten Abbey	Bavaria	752	1062	1803 Sec.	Electorate of Bavaria	Benedictine monastery; Fürststift from 1524. RA / RF	RF
	Klingenmünster Abbey	Rhineland-Palatinate	636?	1115	1567 Sec.	Electorate of the Palatinate	Possibly founded in 636, definitely before 780. Benedictine abbey until 1490; then Herrenstift. RA / RP	RC
	Königsbronn Abbey	Baden-Württemberg (Heidenheim)	1303	probably 15th century	1553 Med.	Duchy of Württemberg	Cistercian monastery, taken over and made Protestant by Württemberg. It remained Protestant despite failed attempts to revert to Catholicism in 1630–32 and 1635–48; it was finally secularised in 1710. RA	
	Kornelimünster Abbey	North Rhine-Westphalia (Aachen)	614	by mid-9th century	1802	Roer	Benedictine monastery. RA	RC
	Kreuzlingen Abbey	Switzerland	c. 1125	1145	1648 Switz.	Canton of Thurgau	Augustinian Canons. Dissolved by the cantonal government in 1848. RA	
	Lindau Abbey	Bavaria	c. 822	1466	1802	Prince of the County of Bretzenheim	Frauenstift, possibly later a Reichsfürstabtei; RA.	SC
	Lorsch Abbey	Hesse (Darmstadt)	764	852 (confirmed)	1232 Med.	Archbishopric of Mainz	Benedictine monastery until 1248; thereafter Premonstratensian until dissolution in 1556. RA	SC
	Malmedy Abbey	Belgium	645	651?	1794 Sec.	Ourthe	Benedictine monastery, forming a single principality with Stavelot. RA	RF
	Marchtal Abbey (also Marchthal)	Baden-Württemberg	before 776	1500	1803 Sec.	County of Thurn und Taxis	Premonstratensian monastery. Refounded 1171. RA	SC
	Marmoutier Abbey; also Maursmünster	Alsace	by 659	659	1789	Bas-Rhin	Benedictine monastery. RA	SC
	Maulbronn Abbey	Baden-Württemberg	1147	1147	1806 Sec.	Kingdom of Württemberg	Cistercian monastery. Seized by Württemberg in 1504, secularised in 1534, alternated between Cistercianism and Protestantism until settled to the latter by Peace of Westphalia in 1648. RA	SC
	Memleben Abbey	Saxony-Anhalt	975	uncertain, poss. late 10th century	1548 Med.	Hersfeld Abbey	Benedictine monastery. RA	RC
	Michaelsberg Abbey (also known as Siegburg Abbey)	North Rhine-Westphalia (Siegburg)	1064	1512	1676 Med.	Duchy of Berg	Benedictine monastery. Secularised in 1803. RA	RC
	Mönchrot Abbey, also Mönchroth, Münchenroth, Rot or Rot an der Rot Abbey	Baden-Württemberg (Rot an der Rot)	1126	1497	1803 Med.	County of Wartenberg	Premonstratensian monastery. RA	SC
	Mondsee Abbey	Austria	748	788	1791	Habsburg monarchy	Benedictine monastery. Imperial immediacy lost to the Bishopric of Regensburg 831–1142. RA	SC
	Abbey of Münster im Gregoriental	Alsace	660	1235	1789 Sec.	Haut-Rhin	Benedictine monastery. RA	SC
	Murbach Abbey (incl Lüders)	Alsace	727	792	1789 Sec.	Haut-Rhin	Benedictine monastery. Effectively French since 1648, but anomalously remained legally part of the Empire; dissolved during the Revolution. RF	RF
	Muri Abbey	Switzerland	1027	1701	1648 Switz.	Helvetic Canton of Baden	Benedictine monastery. The abbey was never immediate, but the abbot was created Reichsfürst in 1701. RA	
	Neresheim Abbey	Baden-Württemberg	1095	1764	1802 Sec.	County of Thurn und Taxis	Benedictine monastery. The abbey's status was the subject of litigation with the County of Oettingen until after 1760. RA	SC
	Niedermünster	Bavaria (Regensburg)	before 700	1002	1803 Sec.	Electorate of Bavaria	Frauenstift. Refounded 788, 948–55. RA	RC
	Nordhausen chapter	Thuringia	poss. mid-10th century	by 1220	1802 Sec.	Kingdom of Prussia	Chapter of Nordhausen Cathedral. RA	
	Obermünster	Bavaria (Regensburg)	early 9th century	before 1024	1810	Kingdom of Bavaria	Benedictine nunnery, later Frauenstift. RA. RF from 1315	RC
	Oberschönenfeld Abbey	Bavaria	c. 1211	1248?	1803 Sec.	Electorate of Bavaria	Beguines until c 1211, then Cistercian nunnery, formalised from 1248. RA	
	Ochsenhausen Abbey	Baden-Württemberg	1093	1495	1803 Sec	County of Metternich-Winnenburg	Benedictine monastery. RA	SC
	Odenheim Abbey (originally Wigoldsberg; later also Odenheim and Bruchsal)	Baden-Württemberg	c. 1108	by 1161	1802–03 Sec	Margraviate of Baden	Benedictine monastery; Herrenstift from 1496. RA	RC
	Ottobeuren Abbey	Bavaria	764	1299, regranted 1710	1802 Sec	Electorate of Bavaria ( Bishopric of Augsburg 1624–1710)	Benedictine monastery. RA	SC
	Petershausen Abbey	Baden-Württemberg (Konstanz)	983	early 13th century	1802 Sec	Margraviate of Baden	Benedictine monastery. RA	SC
	Pfäfers Abbey	Switzerland	731	1408	1648 Switz.	Swiss condominium	Benedictine monastery. Ceased to be part of HRE in 1648 (secularised 1798; re-established 1803). RA	
	Prüfening Abbey	Bavaria (Regensburg)	1119	Unknown	1803 Sec.	Electorate of Bavaria	Benedictine monastery. RA	SC
	Prüm Abbey	Rhineland-Palatinate	720	1222	1576 Sec.	Archbishopric of Trier	Benedictine monastery. Annexed by France 1794. RF	RF
	Quedlinburg Abbey	Saxony-Anhalt	936	936	1803	Kingdom of Prussia	Frauenstift; Lutheran from 1540. RA	RC
	Recklinghausen Abbey (also Rechenhausen)	North Rhine-Westphalia	Unknown	Unknown	Unknown	Essen Abbey	RA	
	Reichenau Abbey	Baden-Württemberg	724	Unknown	1540 or 1548	Bishopric of Constance	Benedictine monastery. RA	SC
	Riddagshausen Abbey	Brunswick	1145/46	Uncertain, early	1569 Med.	Brunswick-Wolfenbüttel	Cistercian monastery. Mediatised on Reformation to Lutheran seminary; secularised 1809. RA	
	Roggenburg Abbey	Bavaria	1126	1482–1485	1803 Sec.	Electorate of Bavaria	Premonstratensian monastery. RA	SC
	Rottenmünster Abbey	Baden-Württemberg (Rottweil)	1224	1237	1803 Sec.	Duchy of Württemberg	Cistercian nunnery. Reopened 1898. RA	SC
	Saalfeld Abbey	Thuringia (Saalfeld)	1071	Unknown	1526 Sec.	Electorate of Saxony	Benedictine monastery. RA	
	St Bartholomäus cathedral chapter	Hesse (Frankfurt am Main)	852	Unknown	1803 Sec.	Imperial City of Frankfurt	Chapter of the Kaiserdom in Frankfurt. RP	RC
	St. Blaise's in the Black Forest	Baden-Württemberg	Uncertain	1609	1806 Sec.	Grand Duchy of Baden	Benedictine monastery. The Prince-Abbot of St. Blaise's had princely status (RF) not because of the abbey itself but because the abbey had acquired the County of Bonndorf, which carried princely status with it from 1609	
	St. Emmeram's Abbey	Bavaria (Regensburg)	c. 739	1295	1803 Sec.	Principality of Regensburg	Benedictine monastery. RA	RC
	St. Gall	Switzerland	613	1207	1798 Sec. (1648 Switz.)	Helvetic Canton of Säntis	Benedictine monastery; later Fürstabtei. Swiss associate from 1451; secularised temporarily 1527–32. RA / RF	SC
	St George's at Isny in the Allgäu	Baden-Württemberg (Isny im Allgäu)	1096	1781	1803 Sec.	Princely County of Quadt-Wykradt	Benedictine monastery. RA	SC
	St. George's Abbey, Stein am Rhein	Switzerland (Stein am Rhein)	9th century	15th century	1521–26 Sec.	Canton of Zurich	Founded 9th century on the Hohentwiel; moved to Stein am Rhein c. 1007. RA	
	St. Giles' Abbey, Nuremberg (Schottenkloster Sankt Ägidien)	Bavaria	c. 1140	Unknown	1525 Med.	Imperial City of Nuremberg	"Schottenkloster"; Benedictine monastery from 1418. Absorbed by Nuremberg in 1525 (possibly 1567) as unable to document immediacy. RA	
	St. Ludger's Abbey	Lower Saxony (Helmstedt)	c. 800	Unknown	1802 Sec.	Brunswick-Wolfenbüttel	Benedictine monastery. RA	RC
	St. Maximin's Abbey, Trier	Rhineland-Palatinate	4th century	before early 12th century	1669 Med.	Archbishopric of Trier	Benedictine monastery. Mediatised to the Electorate of the Palatinate in the 16th century, but status not finalised until immediacy definitively surrendered to Trier in 1669. RA	RC
	St. Peter's Abbey in the Black Forest	Baden-Württemberg	before 1073	1093	1806 Sec.	Grand Duchy of Baden	Benedictine monastery. RA	
	St. Ulrich's and St. Afra's Abbey	Bavaria	c. 10th century	1577 de jure 1643 de facto	1802 Sec.	Imperial City of Augsburg; Electorate of Bavaria	Benedictine monastery from 1006–12; probably refounded from a 5th- or 6th-century predecessor. The abbey was made immediate in 1577, but its status was challenged by the Bishop of Augsburg in litigation until 1643/44. RA	RC
	Salem Abbey aka Salmansweiler	Baden-Württemberg	1136	1138–52	1803 Sec.	Margraviate of Baden	Cistercian monastery. RA	SC
	Schaffhausen Abbey	Switzerland	1049	1190	1529 Med.	Canton of Schaffhausen	Benedictine monastery. RA	
	Schänis Abbey	Switzerland	9th century	1045	1438 Med.	Swiss condominium	Frauenstift. Frederick IV, King of Germany confirmed the abbatial rights in 1442, but the link with the Empire was broken; the abbess continued to bear the title of Princess of the Holy Roman Empire until secularisation to the canton of St. Gallen under the Act of Mediation in 1803. Suspended during the Protestant Reformation 1529–31. RA	SC
	Schussenried Abbey	Baden-Württemberg	1183	1440	1803 Sec.	County of Sternberg-Manderscheid	Premonstratensian monastery. RA	SC
	Schuttern Abbey	Baden-Württemberg	603	975	1801 Sec.	Duchy of Modena	Benedictine monastery. Not to be confused with Schottern Abbey in Austria, secularised in the 15th century. RA	SC
	Selz Abbey	Baden, later Alsace	991	992	1481 Med.	Electorate of the Palatinate	Benedictine monastery / nunnery. Secularised in 1803. RA	
	Söflingen Abbey (sometimes Söfflingen)	Baden-Württemberg (Ulm)	1258	1773	1797 Sec.	Electorate of Bavaria	Poor Clares. RA	SC
	Stablo or Stavelot Abbey (also Stablingen)	Belgium	651	651?	1794 Sec.	Ourthe	Benedictine monastery. Formed a single principality with Malmedy. RF.	RF
	Thorn Abbey	The Netherlands (Limburg)	c. 975	1292	1795 Sec.	Meuse-Inférieure	Frauenstift. RA. RF from 1793.	RC
	Ursberg Abbey	Bavaria	1126–28	1143	1803 Sec.	Electorate of Bavaria	Premonstratensian monastery. Not to be confused with Urspring Abbey. RA	SC
	Waldsassen Abbey	Bavaria	1128–32	1147	1543 Med.	Electorate of the Palatinate	Cistercian monastery. Secularised to the Electorate of Bavaria in 1803; reopened as Cistercian nunnery 1863. RA	SC
	Walkenried Abbey	Lower Saxony	1127	1542	1648 Med.	Brunswick-Wolfenbüttel	Cistercian monastery. RA	RC
	Weingarten Abbey	Baden-Württemberg	1056	1274	1803 Sec.	Principality of Nassau-Orange-Fulda	Benedictine monastery. RA	SC
	Weissenau Abbey	Baden-Württemberg (Ravensburg)	1145	c. 1257	1802	County of Sternberg-Manderscheid	Premonstratensian monastery. RA	SC
	Weissenburg Abbey	Alsace	7th century	Unknown	1306 Med.	Imperial City of Weissenburg	Reichspropstei. Raised to Imperial city 1306, joined Décapole 1354, annexed by France 1697. RP / RF (status later assumed by Bishop of Speyer).	RF
	Werden Abbey	North Rhine-Westphalia (Essen)	799	877	1803	Kingdom of Prussia	Benedictine monastery. RA	RC
	Wettenhausen Abbey	Bavaria	1130	Unknown	1803 Sec.	Electorate of Bavaria	Augustinian Canons. Founded on the site of an earlier foundation, dated 982. RA	SC
	Zwiefalten Abbey	Baden-Württemberg	1089	1750	1802 Sec.	Duchy of Württemberg	Benedictine monastery. RA	SC
CoA	Religious house	Location	Founded	Imm.	Lost imm.	To...	Description and status	College

=== List B: Reichsmatrikel 1521 ===
The Matrikel of 1521 included a number of religious houses which have not been identified:

Religious house	Location	Dates	Description and Imperial status
Beckenried Abbey	Switzerland	ceased to be part of the HRE in 1648	RA
Blankenburg Abbey	nk	nk	nk
Brunnen Abbey	Landstrass, Carinthia (Austria)	nk	nk
Hynoltshusen Abbey	nk	nk	monastery
Kitzingen Abbey	nk	nk	monastery
Rockenhausen	nk	nk	RA
St. Johann (St. John's Abbey)	nk	nk	nk

Inclusion in the 1521 Reichsmatrikel is not by itself conclusive evidence that a particular religious house was in fact an Imperial abbey, and the status of the following abbey listed in the Matrikel is questionable in the absence of further confirmation from other sources:

Religious house	Location	Dates	Description and Imperial status
St. John's Abbey in the Thurtal (Sant Johans im Turital)	Switzerland (Alt St. Johann, later Nesslau)	fdd. before 1152; RU nk (if at all); subordinated to St. Gall's Abbey 1555; ceased to be part of the HRE 1648 (dissolved 1805)	Benedictine monastery. Imperial status unknown

=== List C: Imperial abbeys not named in the Matrikel ===
For a variety of reasons a quantity of religious houses that possessed, or claimed, the status of Imperial immediacy either did not attend the Imperial Diet, or were not listed in the surviving Matrikel. The following list is very far from complete, and possibly some of those listed may not in fact have been immediate (reichsunmittelbar).

Religious house	Location	Dates	Description and Imperial status
Amorbach Abbey	Bavaria		
Edelstetten Abbey	Bavaria	fdd. 1126; more a charitable institution for daughters of the lower Swabian nobility than a monastery. Except for the abbesses, the women were free to leave after some time and get married. Imperial abbey status in 1783 only. Secularized in 1803 and given as a principality to Prince Charles-Joseph de Ligne. One year later, he sold his principality to Nikolaus II, Prince Esterházy.	Augustinian monastery. RA
Engelberg Abbey	Switzerland	Founded in 1120 by Count Blessed Conrad of Seldenburen. Engelberg Abbey (German: Kloster Engelberg) is a Benedictine monastery in Engelberg, Canton of Obwalden, Switzerland. Initially, the abbey was placed under the immediate jurisdiction of the Holy See, which condition continued until the formation of the Swiss Congregation in 1602 when Engelberg united with the other monasteries of Switzerland and became subject to a president and general chapter. In 1873 a colony from Engelberg founded Conception Abbey, at Conception, Missouri in the United States; in 1882, Mount Angel Abbey was founded near what is now Mount Angel, Oregon, also in the United States. William Wordsworth wrote a poem about the abbey entitled "Engelberg, The Hill of Angels"	Benedictine monastery. RA
Munsterbilzen Abbey	Belgium		
Nienburg Abbey	Saxony-Anhalt	fdd 975; RA temp. Otto II; mediatised 1166 by the Archbishop of Magdeburg; secularised 1563 by the Prince of Anhalt-Dessau	Benedictine monastery. RA
Nivelles Abbey	Belgium		
Schöntal Abbey	Baden-Württemberg	fdd. 1157; RA from 1418 to 1495; secularised 1803	Cistercian monastery. RA
Tegernsee Abbey	Bavaria	fdd 760s; granted RA status by Otto II around 978 but unable to exercise effective Imperial immediacy; remained subordinate to Bavaria until secularization in 1803.	Benedictine monastery. RA
Wiblingen Abbey	Baden-Württemberg, Ulm	fdd. 1037; subordinate to Habsburg high jurisdiction (Oberhoheit) from about 1500; gained more autonomy in 1701 but was unable to gain immediacy and remained part of Further Austria until secularization in 1806.	Benedictine monastery

== See also ==
- Hochstift

== Bibliography ==
In German:

- Matthäi, George, 1877: Die Klosterpolitik Kaiser Heinrichs II. Ein Beitrag zur *Geschichte der Reichsabteien. Grünberg i.Schl.
- Brennich, Max, 1908: Die Besetzung der Reichsabteien in den Jahren 1138–1209. Greifswald.
- Polzin, Johannes: Die Abtswahlen in den Reichsabteien von 1024–1056.
- Riese, Heinrich, 1911: Die Besetzung der Reichsabteien in den Jahren 1056–1137.
- Feierabend, Hans, 1913, repr. 1971: Die politische Stellung der deutschen Reichsabteien während des Investiturstreites. Breslau 1913; Aalen 1971
- Wehlt, Hans-Peter, 1970: Reichsabtei und König
- Vogtherr, Thomas, 2000: Die Reichsabteien der Benediktiner und das Königtum im hohen Mittelalter (900–1125) (Mittelalter-Forschungen, vol. 5)
