= Kreuzlingen Abbey =

Coordinates: 47.645546°N 9.178812°E

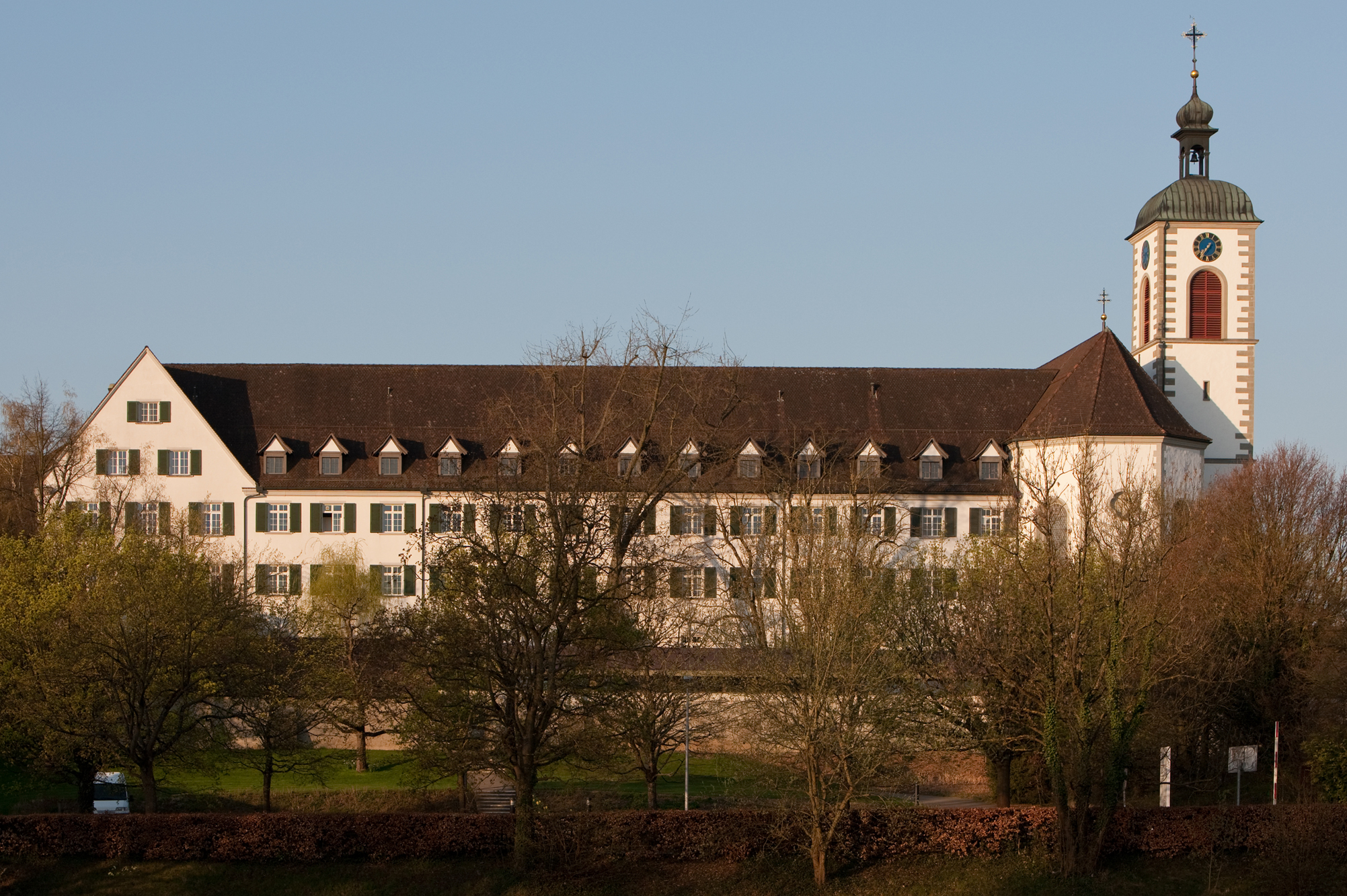
Abbey church of St. Ulrich and St. Afra

Kreuzlingen Abbey (Stift Kreuzlingen or Kloster Kreuzlingen), in Kreuzlingen in Switzerland, on the border with Germany, was founded in about 1125 by Ulrich I of Dillingen, Bishop of Constance, as a house of Augustinian Canons. In 1848, the government of the Canton of Thurgau dissolved the monastery and took over its property. The former abbey church of Saint Ulrich and Saint Afra, decorated in the Baroque style, is noteworthy.

== History ==
=== Before the foundation ===
Saint Conrad, Bishop of Constance from 935 to 976, brought back from Jerusalem a fragment of the True Cross, which he presented to the hospital he had founded in the suburb of Stadelhofen and from which it took the name of "Crucelin" which later became Crucelingen / Kreuzlingen. In 1093 this hospital was burnt down during hostilities between the Bishop of Constance and the Abbot of St. Gall.

=== Foundation ===
Ulrich I, bishop of Constance from 1111 to 1127, restored the derelict hospital of Kreuzlingen in about 1125 by founding, on the eastern edge of the suburb of Stadelhofen, a house of Augustinian Canons (indeed, one of the earliest) dedicated to Saints Ulrich and Afra.

== The first and second buildings ==
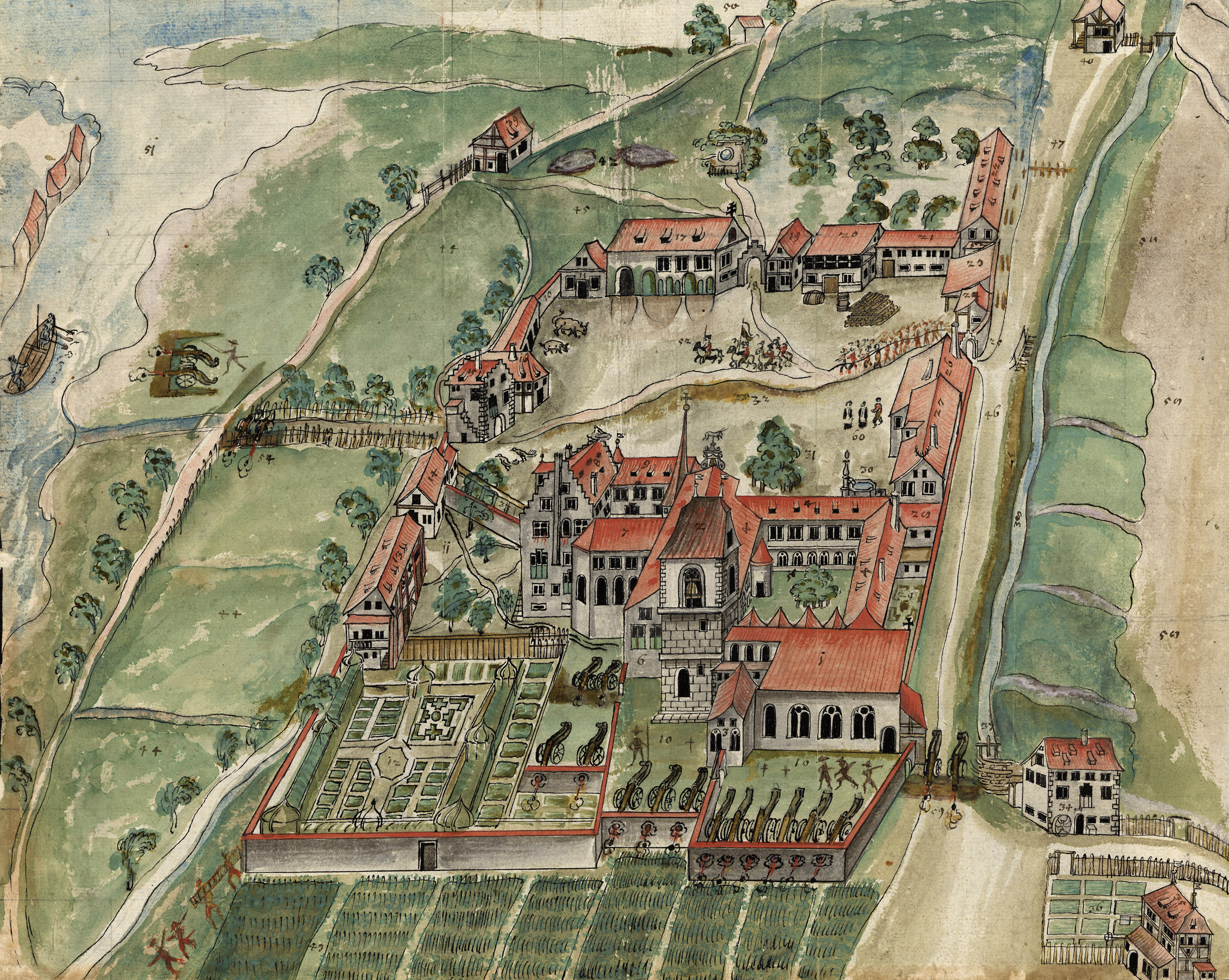
Kloster Kreuzlingen 1633

In 1144 Pope Lucius II, and in 1145 Emperor Frederick Barbarossa took the monastery under their protection. Kreuzlingen became an Imperial abbey. The abbots, now Imperial prelates, were territorial lords of the small lordship of Hirschlatt north of Friedrichshafen, and this was also their place of refuge in times of war.

The first monastery, as the result of the construction of the town wall intended to protect Stadelhofen from Appenzell, stood outside the suburb.

At the time of the Council of Constance (1414-1418) the abbot of Kreuzlingen gave shelter from 27 to 28 October 1414 to the later deposed Pope John XXIII, who in return granted the abbot the right to use the pontificalia.

After the Swabian War, in the Peace of Basle of 15 October 1499 the Duke of Milan ceded the sovereignty of Thurgau to the Swiss. This so angered the inhabitants of Constance that they burned down the abbey of Kreuzlingen. The city was compelled to rebuild the abbey, and on 17 April 1509 Abbot Peter I von Babenberg (1498-1545) was able to rededicate the new church.

During the Thirty Years' War, despite the neutrality of the Swiss, an army entered Thurgau via Stein am Rhein, advanced on Kreuzlingen and besieged Constance unsuccessfully, losing several thousand men. When on 2 October the troops left Kreuzlingen, the people of Constance destroyed the abbey a second time. It was now decided that the monastery should not be rebuilt right up against the walls of Constance, but should be removed from it by not less than the distance of a cannon shot.

== The third building 1760-1848 ==
On 4 July 1650 the foundation stone of the new premises was laid and on 25 October 1653 the church of Saints Ulrich and Afra was dedicated.

It was constructed according to plans by Michael Beer of Vorarlberg, the founder of the Auer Zunft between 1650 and 1653, by the master builder of Constance, Stephan Gunertsreiner, and the mason Melchior Gruber. The Chapel of the Mount of Olives was constructed in 1760, and four years later the church and parts of the monastery were remodelled in the Rococo style.

== Dissolution ==
The monastery was severely restricted from 1798 by the cantonal government, and despite considerable resourcefulness in developing new educational functions in order to remain in existence, was eventually dissolved in 1848 by the Canton of Thurgau. Some of the buildings, including the library wing and the Lady Chapel with the crypt, were demolished. The remaining buildings were designated for use by the canton's teacher training college. The church was preserved for the use of the town and is now a basilica minor.

== Church ==
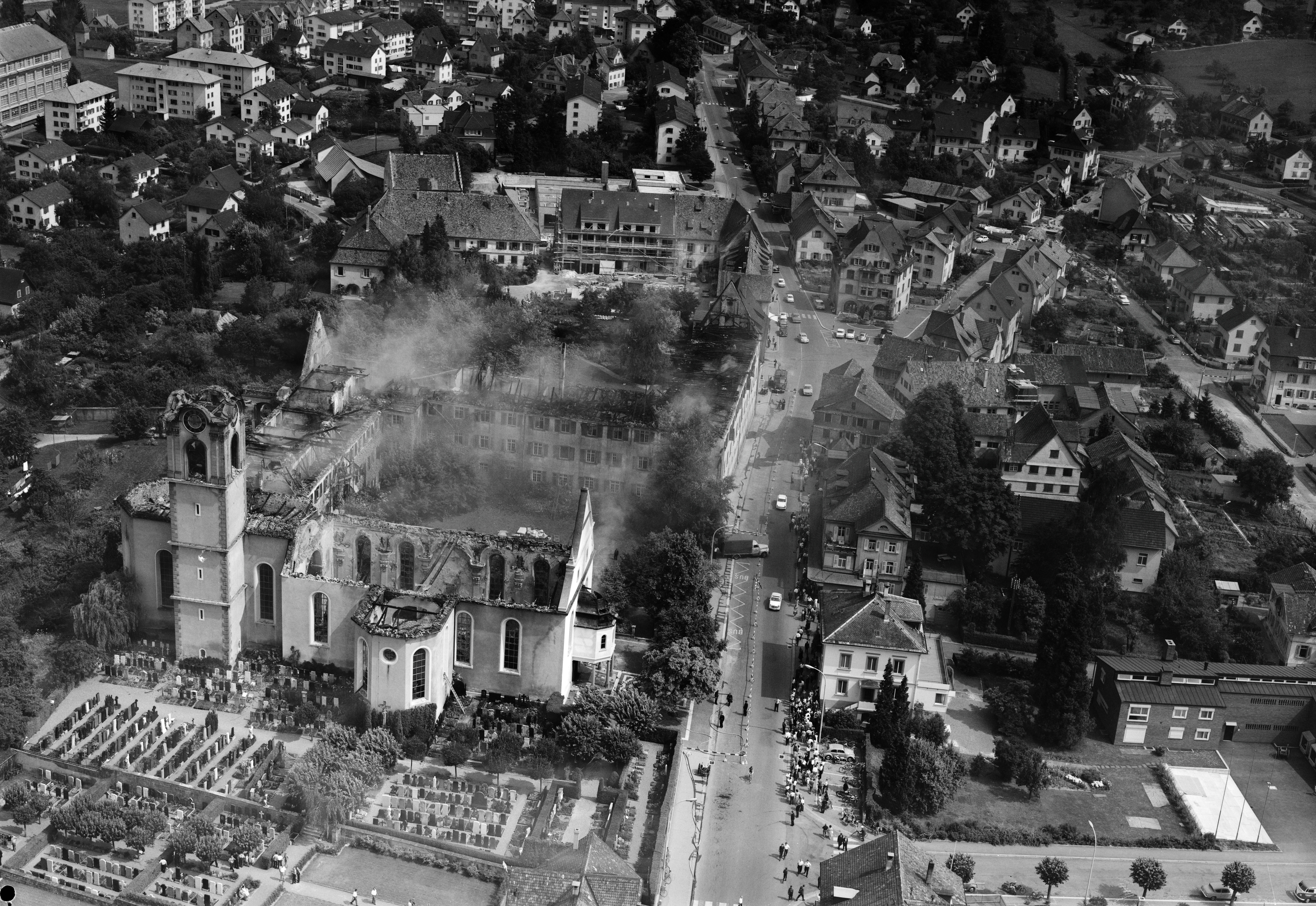
Aftermath of the fire in 1963

In the early 1960s, the church was totally renovated. Shortly afterwards, on the night of 19–20 July 1963, as a result of welding work in the roof of the seminary, the entire building burnt down. The fire did not claim the external walls, the choir screen, the choir ceiling and the choir stalls, or the greater part of the wooden figures in the Chapel of the Mount of Olives. Thanks however to the enormous contributions of the conservator Albert Knoepfli and the deacon Alfons Gmür the church was rebuilt under the direction of Hans Burkard by 1967.

The ceiling paintings by Franz Ludwig Herrmann show scenes from the monastic life of Saint Augustine of Hippo. The magnificent choir screen was made in 1737 by Johann Jakob Hoffner. The statues, larger than life-size, of Saints Ulrich and Afra were carved by Hans Christoph Schenk. Of particular interest is the Chapel of the Mount of Olives with a crucifix and a Calvary. The ceiling painting shows Moses with the brazen serpent and is also by Franz Ludwig Herrmann (1761). The representation of the Mount of Olives, made out of beechwood by Innozenz Beck, contains about 250 original statuettes, about 30 centimetres high, carved of Swiss stone pine wood ("Arvenholz") in about 1720-1730 somewhere in the south-eastern Alpine region.

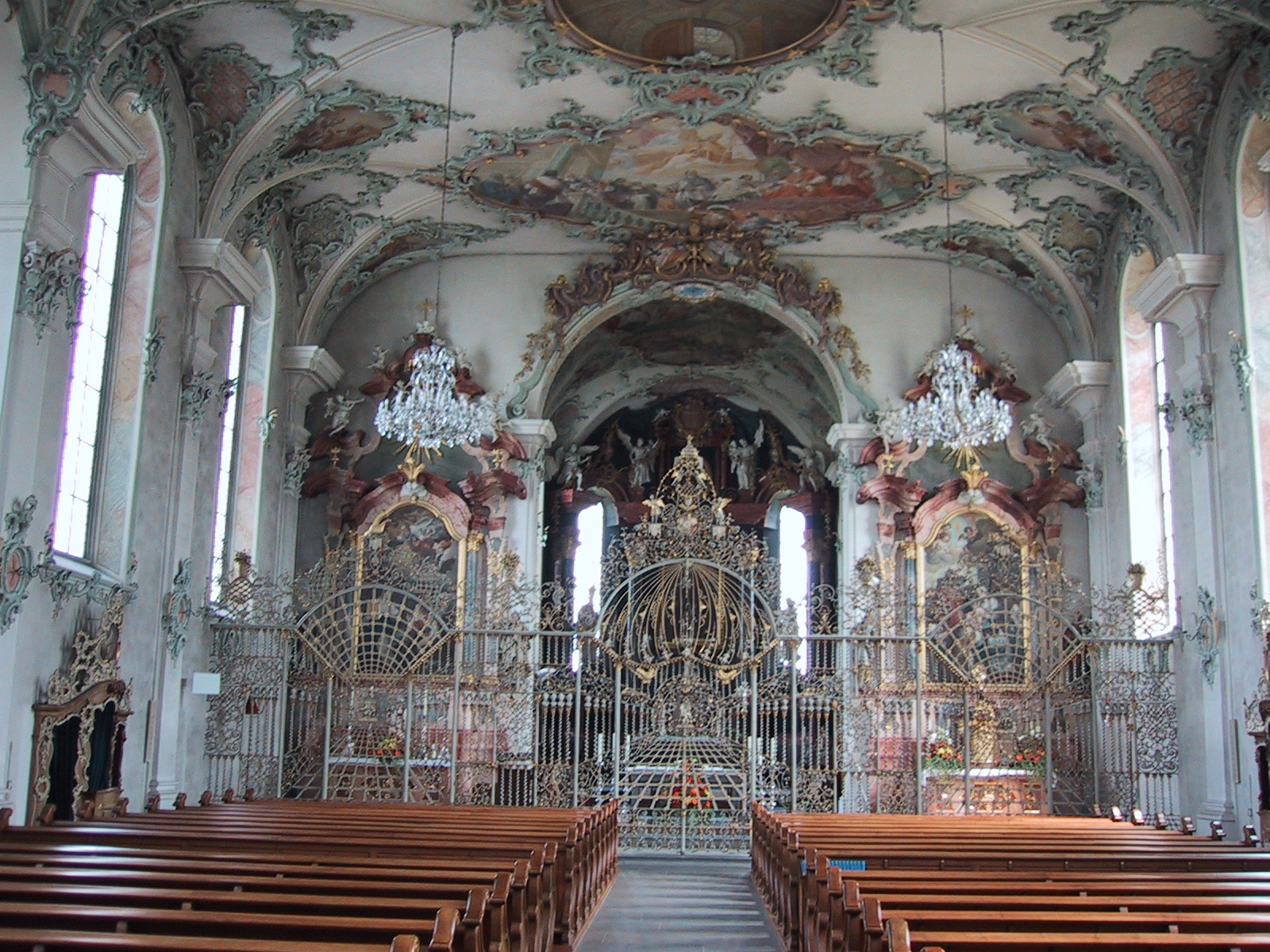

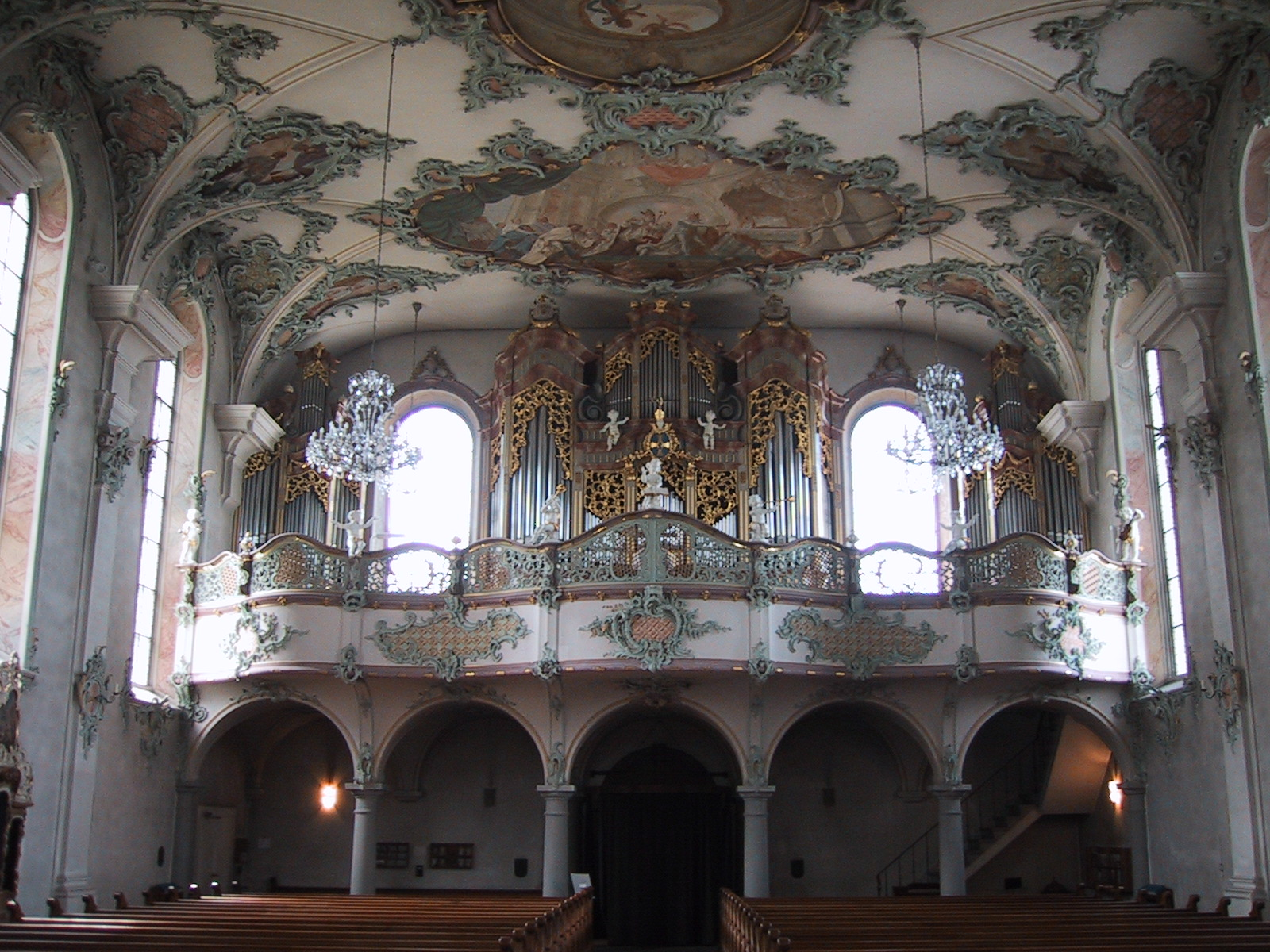

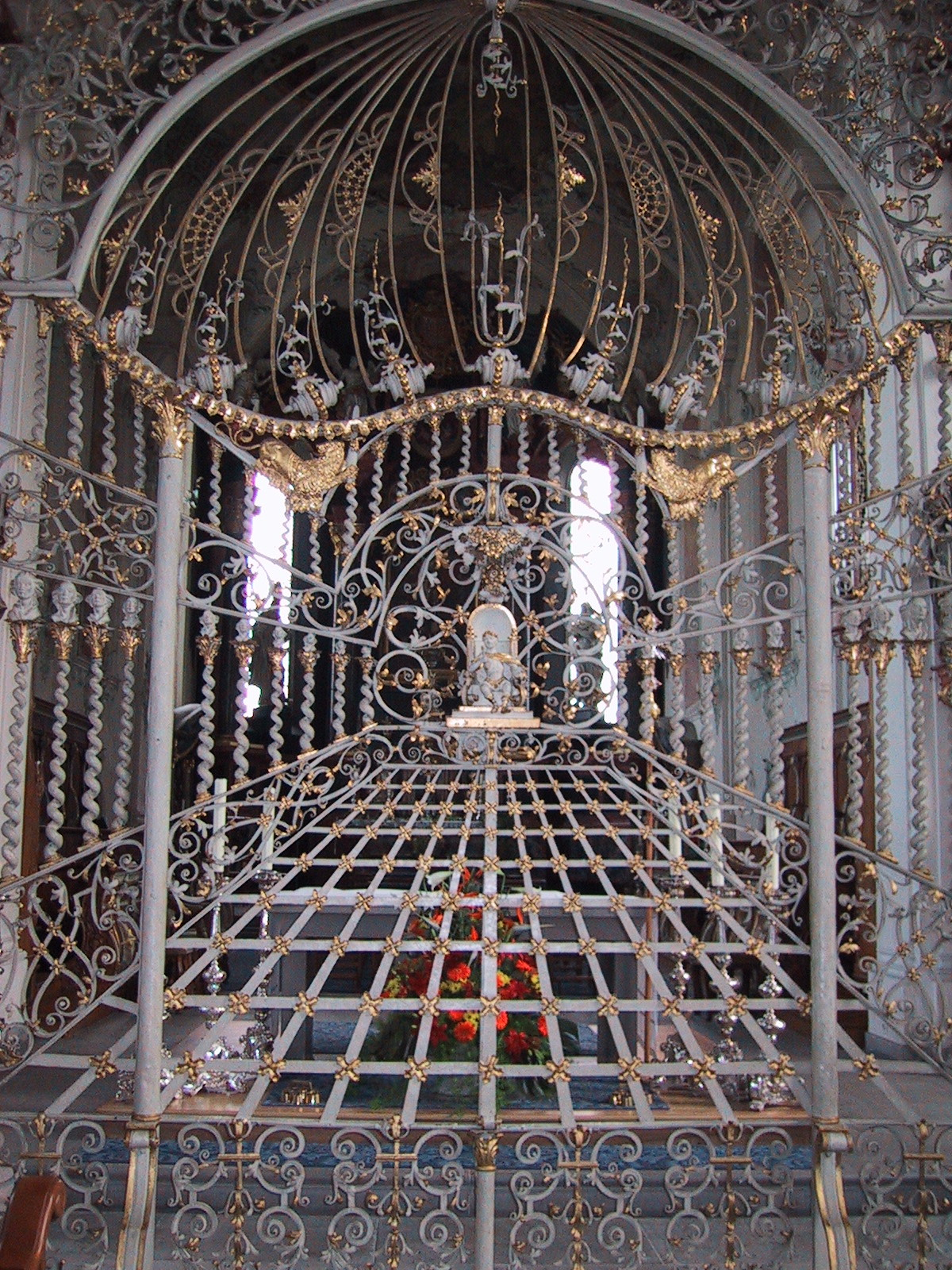

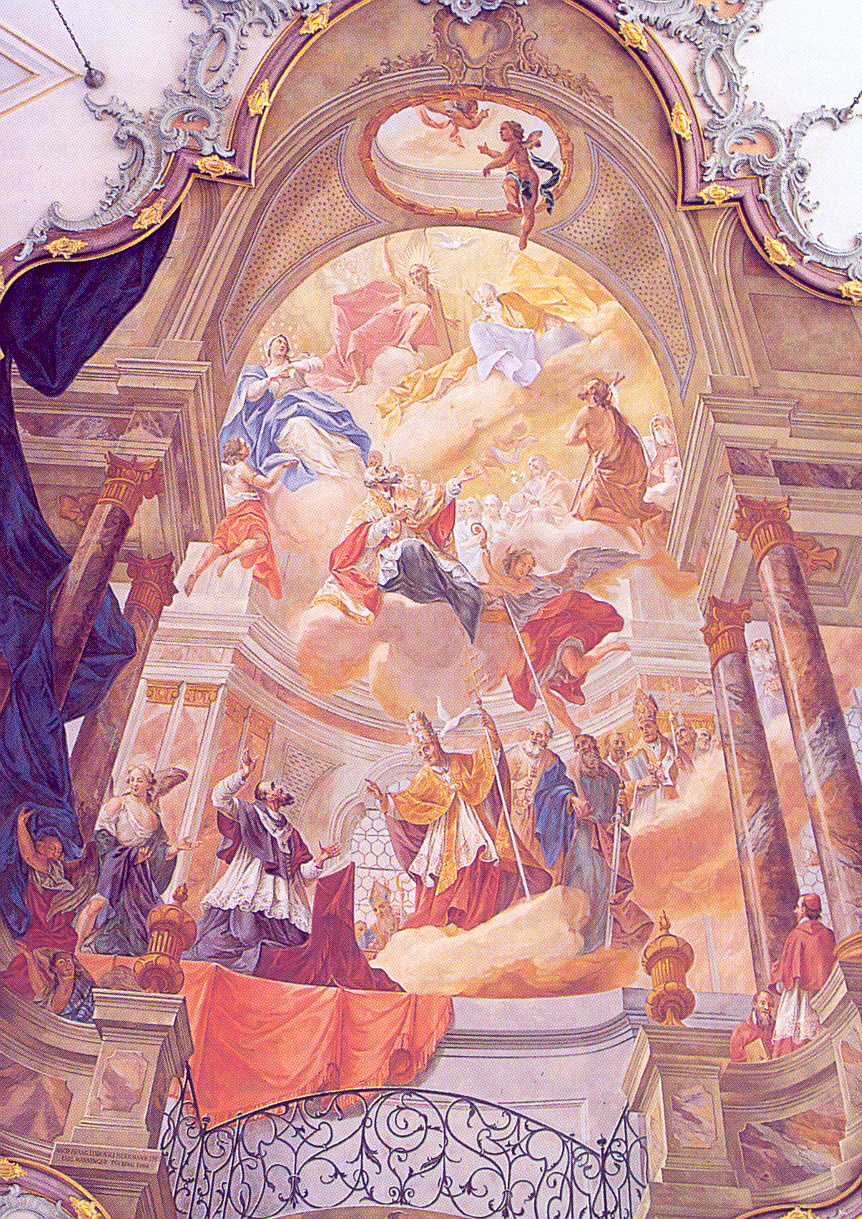

== Sources ==
- Kreuzlingen (Stift) in German, French and Italian in the online Historical Dictionary of Switzerland.
