= List of states in the Holy Roman Empire (W) =

This is a list of states in the Holy Roman Empire beginning with the letter W. Some historians mark the beginning of the Empire as 800, with the coronation of Frankish king Charlemagne ("Charles the Great").

Name	Type	Imperial circle	Imperial diet	History
Waadt; See: Vaud	County			
Wädenswil	Lordship; 1330: Commandry	n/a	n/a	1130: First mentioned 1287: Sold to the Order of St John; attached to the Commandry of Bubikon; 1330: Separate commandry 1549: Sold to Zürich; 1648: Left the Empire as part of Switzerland
Waldbott (Walpode)	Lordship	n/a	n/a	1136: First mentioned 1267: Acquired Waltmannshausen as fief of Dietz; known henceforth as Waldbott von Waltmannshausen
Waldbott von Bassenheim	Lordship; 1654: Barony; 1720: County	Upp Rhen	WE	1337: Side line of Waldbott von Waltmannshausen established at Bassenheim; 1477: Acquired Olbrück; 1512: Acquired Gudenau; 1554: Partitioned into itself, Waldbott von Bassenheim zu Olbrück and Waldbott von Bassenheim zu Gudenau; 1652: Acquired half of Pyrmont; 1654: HRE Baron; acquired Kransberg; 1710: Acquired rest of Pyrmont; 1788: Joined the Westphalian Counts' benches 1794: To France; 1803: Compensated with Heggbach; 1806: To Bavaria; 1810: To Württemberg
Waldbott von Bassenheim zu Bornheim	Lordship	n/a	n/a	1589: Partitioned from Waldbott von Bassenheim zu Olbrück
Waldbott von Bassenheim zu Gudenau	Lordship; 1659: Barony	n/a	n/a	1554: Partitioned from Waldbott von Bassenheim; 1659: HRE Baron; 1663: Acquired Odenhausen; 1735: Extinct; to Waldbott von Bassenheim
Waldbott von Bassenheim zu Königsfeld	Lordship; 1646: Barony	n/a	n/a	1589: Partitioned from Waldbott von Bassenheim zu Olbrück; 1646: HRE Baron; 1763: Extinct; to Waldbott von Bassenheim zu Bornheim
Waldbott von Bassenheim zu Olbrück	Lordship	n/a	n/a	1554: Partitioned from Waldbott von Bassenheim; 1589: Partitioned into Waldbott von Bassenheim zu Königsfeld, Waldbott von Bassenheim zu Bornheim and itself 1744: Extinct; to Waldbott von Bassenheim zu Bornheim
Waldbott von Waltmannshausen	Lordship	n/a	n/a	1267: Renamed from Waldbott (Walpode); 13th Century: Acquired Bassenheim; 1337: Side line Waldbott von Bassenheim established
Waldburg	Lordship	n/a	n/a	1108: First mentioned 1210: Extinct; inherited by and renamed from Tanne; 1214: Side line Winterstetten founded c. 1237: Partitioned into Waldburg-Rohrdorf, Waldburg-Waldburg and Waldburg-Warthausen
Waldburg-Capustigall	Lordship; 1686: County	n/a	n/a	c. 1524: Line founded by Frederick I of Waldburg-Trauchburg in Prussia; 1686: HRE Count
Waldburg-Friedberg and Scheer	Barony; 1628: County	Swab	SC	1580: Partitioned from Waldburg-Trauchburg; 1593: Acquired Trauchburg; 1612: Partitioned into itself and Waldburg-Trauchburg; 1628: HRE Count; 1696: Placed under Imperial administration 1717: Extinct; to Joseph William Eusebius of Waldburg-Trauchburg; 1756: Extinct; to Leopold Augustus of Waldburg-Trauchburg and Kißlegg; 1764: Extinct; to Waldburg-Trauchburg and Kißlegg
Waldburg-Messkirch (Waldburg-Meßkirch)	Lordship	n/a	n/a	c. 1300: Partitioned from Waldburg-Rohrdorf; 1354: Extinct; to Zimmern by marriage
Waldburg-Rohrdorf	Lordship	n/a	n/a	c. 1237: Partitioned from Waldburg c. 1300: Partitioned into Waldburg-Messkirch and itself c. 1432: Extinct
Waldburg-Sonnenberg	Lordship; 1463: County	n/a	n/a	1429: Partitioned from Waldburg-Waldburg; 1433: Acquired Scheer; 1452: Acquired Friedberg; 1455: Acquired Sonnenberg; 1463: HRE Count; 1474: Sold Sonnenberg to Austria; 1480: Partitioned into Waldburg-Sonnenberg-Sonnenberg, Waldburg-Sonnenberg-Friedberg and Waldburg-Sonnenberg-Wolfegg
Waldburg-Sonnenberg-Friedberg	County	Swab	SC	1480: Partitioned from Waldburg-Sonnenberg; 1511: Extinct; to Waldburg-Trauchburg
Waldburg-Sonnenberg-Sonnenberg	County	n/a	n/a	1480: Partitioned from Waldburg-Sonnenberg; 1483: Extinct; divided between Waldburg-Sonnenberg-Friedberg and Waldburg-Sonnenberg-Wolfegg
Waldburg-Sonnenberg-Wolfegg	County	Swab	SC	1480: Partitioned from Waldburg-Sonnenberg; 1510: Extinct; to Waldburg-Zeil
Waldburg-Trauchburg	Lordship; 16th Century: Barony; 1628: County	Swab	SC	1339: Partitioned from Waldburg-Waldburg; 1365: Sold Isny its sovereign rights 1374: Sold Trauchburg to Waldburg-Waldburg; 1386: Extinct; 1429: Partitioned from Waldburg-Waldburg c. 1524: Side line Waldburg-Capustigall founded 15??: HRE Baron; 1580: Partitioned into itself and Waldburg-Scheer and Friedberg; 1593: Extinct; to Waldburg-Friedberg and Scheer; 1612: Partitioned from Waldburg-Friedberg and Scheer; 1628: HRE Count; 1717: Partitioned into Waldburg-Friedberg and Scheer and Waldburg-Trauchburg and Kißlegg
Waldburg-Trauchburg and Kißlegg	County	Swab	SC	1717: Partitioned from Waldburg-Trauchburg; 1764: Acquired Scheer and Friedberg; 1772: Extinct; to Waldburg-Zeil-Zeil
Waldburg-Waldburg	Lordship	Swab	SC	c. 1237: Partitioned from Waldburg; 1339: Partitioned into itself and Waldburg-Trauchburg; 1429: Partitioned into Waldburg-Sonnenberg, Waldburg-Trauchburg and Waldburg-Zeil; 1595: Partitioned from Waldburg-Zeil; 1600: Extinct; divided between Waldburg-Wolfegg and Waldburg-Zeil
Waldburg-Warthausen	Lordship	n/a	n/a	c. 1237: Partitioned from Waldburg; 1290: Extinct; to Waldburg-Waldburg
Waldburg-Wolfegg	Lordship; 1628: County	Swab	SC	1595: Partitioned from Waldburg-Zeil; 1628: HRE Count; 1672: Partitioned into Waldburg-Wolfegg-Wolfegg and Waldburg-Wolfegg-Waldsee
Waldburg-Wolfegg-Waldsee	County; 1803: Principality	Swab	SC	1672: Partitioned from Waldburg-Wolfegg; 1803: HRE Prince; 1806: To Württemberg
Waldburg-Wolfegg-Wolfegg	County	Swab	SC	1672: Partitioned from Waldburg-Wolfegg; 1798: Extinct; to Waldburg-Wolfegg-Waldsee
Waldburg-Zeil	Lordship; 1628: County	Swab	SC	1429: Partitioned from Waldburg-Waldburg; 1595: Partitioned into Waldburg-Wolfegg, Waldburg-Waldburg and itself 1628: HRE Count; 1675: Partitioned into Waldburg-Zeil-Zeil and Waldburg-Zeil-Wurzach
Waldburg-Zeil-Hohenems	County	n/a	n/a	1777: Established by marriage of Clemens of Waldburg-Zeil-Trauchburg with Maria Walburga of Harrach-Rohrau, heiress of Hohenems; 1790: Acquired Lustenau; 1806: To Bavaria; 1811: Restored; 1814: To Austria; 1817: Restored; 1830: Sold to Austria
Waldburg-Zeil-Trauchburg	County; 1803: Principality	Swab	SC	1779: Renamed from Waldburg-Zeil-Zeil; 1803: HRE Prince; 1806: To Württemberg; Alt-Trauchburg to Bavaria
Waldburg-Zeil-Wurzach	County; 1803: Principality	Swab	SC	1675: Partitioned from Waldburg-Zeil; 1803: HRE Prince; 1806: To Württemberg; Ferthofen to Bavaria
Waldburg-Zeil-Zeil	County	Swab	SC	1675: Partitioned from Waldburg-Zeil; 1772: Acquired Trauchburg; 1777: Side line Waldburg-Zeil-Hohenems founded 1779: Renamed to Waldburg-Zeil-Trauchburg
Waldeck	Lordship; 1349: County; 1692: Principality	Upp Rhen	WT	1219: Partitioned from Schwalenberg; 1349: HRE County; 1397: Partitioned into Waldeck-Landau and Waldeck-Waldeck; 1692: Reunited by Waldeck-Wildungen; 1706: Appanage Waldeck-Bergheim created 1711: Renamed to Waldeck and Pyrmont; 1805: Partitioned from Waldeck and Pyrmont; 1812: Renamed to Waldeck and Pyrmont
Waldeck and Pyrmont; Prince of Waldeck & Pyrmont, Count of Rappolstein, Lord of Hohenack & Geroldseck am Wasgau	Principality	Upp Rhen	WT / PR	1711: Renamed from Waldeck; 1712: Bench of Secular Princes; 1805: Partitioned into Waldeck and Pyrmont; 1812: Reunited by Waldeck
Waldeck-Bergheim	County	n/a	n/a	1706: Appanage created in Waldeck; 1816: Sideline Waldeck-Limpurg created
Waldeck-Eisenberg	County	Upp Rhen	WT	1486: Partitioned from Waldeck-Waldeck; 1539: Partitioned into Waldeck-Landau and itself 1607: Partitioned into Waldeck-Wildungen and itself 1625: Acquired Pyrmont; 1682: HRE Prince; 1692: Extinct; to Waldeck-Wildungen
Waldeck-Landau	County	Upp Rhen	WT	1397: Partitioned from Waldeck; 1495: Extinct; divided between Waldeck-Eisenberg and Waldeck-Wildungen; 1539: Partitioned from Waldeck-Eisenberg; 1597: Extinct; to Waldeck-Eisenberg
Waldeck-Waldeck	County	n/a	n/a	1397: Partitioned from Waldeck; 1486: Partitioned into Waldeck-Eisenberg and Waldeck-Wildungen
Waldeck-Wildungen	County	Upp Rhen	WT	1486: Partitioned from Waldeck-Waldeck; 1598: Extinct; to Waldeck-Eisenberg; 1607: Partitioned from Waldeck-Eisenberg; 1692: Renamed to Waldeck
Waldsassen	Abbacy	Bav	SP	1133: Abbey established 1147: Imperial immediacy 1348: Sold Luby to Sparneck; 1537: Made fief of the Palatinate; 1571: Abbey dissolved 1661: Restored; fief of Bavaria; 1803: Secularised and suppressed
Walkenried	Abbacy	Upp Sax	RP	1137: Abbey established 1542: Imperial immediacy 1593: Administered by Brunswick-Wolfenbüttel; 1629: Abbey restored 1631: Administered by Brunswick-Wolfenbüttel; 1648: Abbey secularised and suppressed
Wallis; See: Valais	County			
Wallmoden	Lordship	n/a	n/a	1154: First mentioned; ministerialis of Hildesheim; 1529: Partitioned into Wallmoden-Heinde and Wallmoden-Alt-Wallmoden
Wallmoden-Alt-Wallmoden (Wallmoden Younger Line)	Lordship	n/a	n/a	1529: Partitioned from Wallmoden; fief of Hildesheim
Wallmoden-Gimborn	County	Low Rhen	WE	1783: Renamed from Wallmoden-Heinde; HRE Count; 1806: To Berg; 1813: To Prussia
Wallmoden-Heinde (Wallmoden Elder Line)	Lordship	n/a	n/a	1529: Partitioned from Wallmoden; fief of Hildesheim; 1782: Acquired Gimborn and Neustadt; 1783: Renamed to Wallmoden-Gimborn
Walpode; See: Waldbott	Lordship			
Wangen im Allgäu	Imperial City	Swab	SW	1286: Free Imperial City; 1802: To Bavaria; 1810: To Württemberg
Warburg	Imperial City	Low Rhen	RH	1020: To the Bishopric of Paderborn; 1364: Joined the Hanseatic League; 1622: To Brunswick-Wolfenbüttel; 1802: To Prussia; 1807: To Westphalia; 1815: To Prussia
Warmia (Ermland)	Bishopric	n/a	n/a	1243: Diocese established; 1/3 independent, 2/3 to the Teutonic Order; 1356: HRE Prince of the Empire; 1454: Teutonic share to Poland as part of Royal Prussia; 1466: Independence abolished 1772: To Prussia
Wartau	Lordship	n/a	n/a	Originally part of the territory of Pfäfers Abbey; 1261: To Wildenberg; 1320: To Werdenberg-Heiligenberg; 1413: Sold to Austria; 1414: To Toggenburg; 1429: To Thierstein; 1483: Sold to Zürich, Lucerne, Uri, Schwyz, Unterwalden, Glarus and Zug in condominium 1648: Left the Empire as part of Switzerland
Wartenberg	County	Upp Rhen	n/a	1699: Renamed from Kolb von Wartenberg; HRE Count; 1707: Joined the Upper Rhenish Circle; 1709: Acquired Mettenheim; 1794: To France; 1803: Compensated with Roth Abbey; renamed to Wartenberg-Roth
Wartenberg-Roth	County	Upp Rhen	WE	1803: Renamed from Wartenberg; 1806: To Württemberg
Wasserburg	Lordship	n/a	n/a	10th Century: To Kißlegg as advocates for St Gall's Abbey; 1280: Sold to Schellenberg; 1386: Sold to Montfort-Tettnang-Tettnang; 1439: To Montfort-Tettnang-Rothenfels; 1574: To Montfort-Bregenz-Peggau; 1592: Sold to Fugger-Weißenhorn; 1690: To Fugger-Kirchberg-Weißenhorn; 1755: Sold to Austria; 1805: To Bavaria
Weida	Advocacy (Vogtei)	n/a	n/a	1122: First mentioned 1206: Title of "vogt" confirmed 1209: Partitioned into itself, Plauen and Gera and Greiz and Reichenbach; 1421: Weida sold to Meissen; 1454: Acquired Wildenfels; 1531: Extinct; to Saxony
Weil	Imperial City	Swab	SW	1075: First mentioned; to Hirsau Abbey c. 1275: Free Imperial City; 1803: To Württemberg
Weimar	County	n/a	n/a	949: First mentioned 1062: Inherited by Orlamünde; renamed to Weimar-Orlamünde
Weimar-Orlamünde	County	n/a	n/a	1062: Weimar and Orlamünde united 1112: Extinct; succession war between Andechs-Meran and the Rhenish Palatinate; 1121: To Siegfried II, pretender to the Rhenish Palatinate, who took the name Weimar-Orlamünde; 1140: Extinct; to Brandenburg
Weimar-Orlamünde	County	n/a	n/a	1170: Partitioned from Brandenburg; 1265: Partitioned into Weimar-Orlamünde-Orlamünde and Weimar-Orlamünde-Weimar
Weimar-Orlamünde-Gräfenthal	County	n/a	n/a	1295: Partitioned from Weimar-Orlamünde-Orlamünde; 1406: Partitioned into Weimar-Orlamünde-Lichtenberg, itself and Weimar-Orlamünde-Lauenstein; 1426: Sold Gräfenthal to Saxony; 1460: Extinct
Weimar-Orlamünde-Lauenstein	County	n/a	n/a	1406: Partitioned from Weimar-Lauenstein; 1427: Lauenstein to Brandenburg; 1486: Extinct; Schauenforst to Reuss von Plauen
Weimar-Orlamünde-Lichtenberg	County	n/a	n/a	1406: Partitioned from Weimar-Orlamünde-Lauenstein; 1427: Lichtenberg to Waldenfels; 1445: Magdala to Saxony; 1447: Extinct
Weimar-Orlamünde-Orlamünde	County	n/a	n/a	1265: Partitioned from Weimar-Orlamünde; 1295: Partitioned into itself and Weimar-Orlamünde-Gräfenthal; 1344: Orlamünde sold to Meissen; 1346: Made fief of Meissen; 1411: Extinct; to Meissen
Weimar-Orlamünde-Plassenburg	County	n/a	n/a	1285: Partitioned from Weimar-Orlamünde-Weimar; 1340: Extinct; to the Burgraviate of Nuremberg
Weimar-Orlamünde-Weimar	County	n/a	n/a	1265: Partitioned from Weimar-Orlamünde; 1285: Partitioned into itself and Weimar-Orlamünde-Plassenburg; 1312: Acquired Wiehe; 1321: Partitioned into itself and Weimar-Wiehe; 1346: Made fief of Meissen; 1365: Extinct; permanently attached to Meissen
Weimar-Orlamünde-Wiehe	County	n/a	n/a	1321: Partitioned from Weimar-Weimar; 1346: Made fief of Meissen; 1367: To Brunswick; 1372: Extinct
Weingarten	Abbacy	Swab	SP	1056: Abbey established 1268: Protectorate of Austria; 1274: Imperial immediacy 1613: Acquired Blumenegg; 1803: To Nassau-Orange-Fulda; secularised and suppressed 1806: To Württemberg
Weinsberg	Imperial City	n/a	n/a	1283: Half made Free Imperial City; 1417: Semi-independence revoked 1420: Joined the Weinsberg League; 1430: Free Imperial City; 1440: To the Palatinate; 1504: To Württemberg; 1546: To Austria; 1635: To Trauttmansdorff; 1646: To Württemberg; 1649: To Württemberg-Neuenstadt; 1742: To Württemberg
Weinsberg	Lordship	n/a	n/a	11th Century: First mentioned; Imperial fortress 1140: Given to ministerialis of Schwäbisch Gmünd, who took the name Weinsberg; 1283: City of Weinsberg acquired half-sovereignty 1325: Partitioned into itself and Scheuerberg; 1401: Acquired Reichelsberg; 1430: City of Weinsberg acquired full sovereignty 1450: Sold all but Reichelsberg to the Palatinate; 1507: Extinct; to Würzburg
Weissenau (Weißenau)	Abbacy	Swab	SP	1145: Abbey established c. 1260: Imperial immediacy 1803: To Sternberg-Manderscheid; 1806: To Württemberg
Weissenburg in Alsace (Weißenburg; Wissembourg)	Abbacy; 1524: Provostry	Upp Rhen	EC	c. 660: Abbey established 8th Century: Imperial immediacy 1524: Converted to secular provostry 1546: In personal union with the Bishopric of Speyer; 1678: Made part of France; 1789: Abbey suppressed
Weissenburg in Alsace (Weißenburg; Wissembourg)	Imperial City	Upp Rhen	n/a	1354: Free Imperial City; 1648: Made part of France; 1678: Formally ceded to France
Weissenburg in Bavaria (Weißenburg im Nordgau)	Imperial City	Franc	SW	1296: Free Imperial City; 1802: To Bavaria; 1804: To Prussia; 1806: To Bavaria
Welzheim	Lordship	Franc	FR	Originally a territory of Limpurg; 1379: Half sold to Württemberg; 1418: Remainder sold to Württemberg; 1718: To Graevenitz; 1728: Joined the Franconian Counts; 1733: To Württemberg
Werd	County	n/a	n/a	1189: Title assumed by the Landgraves of Alsace; 1218: Partitioned into itself and Rixingen c. 1340: Sold to Oettingen with remainder of Alsace; 1344: Extinct
Werden; See also: St Ludger	Abbacy	Low Rhen	RP	809: Formed; Always in personal union with St Ludger in Helmstedt; 877: HRE Prince of the Empire; imperial immediacy 1803: To Prussia; 1806: To Berg; 1808: To Westphalia; 1815: To Prussia
Werdenberg	County	n/a	n/a	Name given to the descendants of Rudolf I, co-Count of Montfort (1228-1243); 1258: Werdenberg-Heiligenberg and Werdenberg-Sargans partitioned from Montfort
Werdenberg-Alpeck	County	n/a	n/a	1349: Partitioned from Werdenberg-Trochtelfingen; 1385: Sold to Ulm; 1416: Extinct
Werdenberg-Bludenz	County	n/a	n/a	1377/8: Partitioned from Werdenberg-Heiligenberg; 1394: Sold to Austria; 1418: Extinct
Werdenberg-Heiligenberg	County	n/a	n/a	1258: Partitioned from Montfort; 1274: Acquired Oberschwaben and Churwalden; 1277: Acquired Heiligenberg; 1377/8: Partitioned into Werdenberg-Werdenberg, Werdenberg-Rheineck, Werdenberg-Bludenz and itself 1413: Sold to Austria; 1414: Extinct
Werdenberg-Heiligenberg	County	n/a	n/a	1441: Partitioned from Werdenberg-Trochtelfingen; 1475: Partitioned into Werdenberg-Trochtelfingen, itself and Werdenberg-Sigmaringen; 1503: Extinct; divided between Werdenberg-Trochtelfingen and Werdenberg-Sigmaringen; 1508: Renamed from Werdenberg-Trochtelfingen; 1534: Extinct in male line 1535: Divided between Fürstenberg and Hohenzollern-Hechingen
Werdenberg-Rheineck	County	n/a	n/a	1377/8: Partitioned from Werdenberg-Heiligenberg; 1395: Acquired Werdenberg-Werdenberg; 1395: Most sold to Austria; 1402: Werdenberg to Montfort-Tettnang-Tettnang; 1428: Extinct; to Werdenberg-Trochtelfingen
Werdenberg-Sargans	County	n/a	n/a	1258: Partitioned from Montfort; 1289: Acquired Alpeck; 1312: Partitioned into itself and Werdenberg-Trochtelfingen; 1342: Partitioned into Werdenberg-Sargans-Vaduz and Werdenberg-Sargans-Sargans
Werdenberg-Sargans-Sargans	County	n/a	n/a	1342: Partitioned from Werdenberg-Sargans; 1396: Sold to Austria; 1436: Repurchased Sargans from Austria; rest remained lost 1483: Sold to the Swiss Confederation; 1501: Extinct
Werdenberg-Sargans-Vaduz	County	n/a	n/a	1342: Partitioned from Werdenberg-Sargans; 1416: Extinct; to Brandis
Werdenberg-Sigmaringen	County	n/a	n/a	1475: Partitioned from Werdenberg-Heiligenberg; 1508: Extinct; to Werdenberg-Trochtelfingen
Werdenberg-Trochtelfingen	County	n/a	n/a	1312: Partitioned from Werdenberg-Sargans (in Alpeck); 1316: Acquired Trochtelfingen; 1349: Partitioned into Werdenberg-Alpeck and itself 1399: Acquired Sigmaringen and Veringen; 1413: Sold Schmalegg to Ravensburg; 1434: Acquired Werdenberg-Rheineck; 1441: Partitioned into itself and Werdenberg-Heiligenberg; 1475: To Werdenberg-Heiligenberg, then given to George III; 1508: Renamed to Werdenberg-Heiligenberg
Werdenberg-Werdenberg	County	n/a	n/a	1377/8: Partitioned from Werdenberg-Heiligenberg; 1390: Extinct; succession war between Werdenberg-Rheineck and Werdenberg-Sargans-Sargans; 1395: To Werdenberg-Rheineck
Werdenfels	County	n/a	n/a	Originally to Eschenlohe; 1294: To Freising; 1803: To Bavaria
Werl	County	n/a	n/a	987: First mentioned 1062: Lost the Emsgau to the Archbishopric of Bremen c. 1070: Partitioned into Werl-Arnsberg and Werl-Werl
Werl-Arnsberg	County	n/a	n/a	c. 1070: Partitioned from Werl; 1124: Extinct in male line 1132: To Cuijk-Arnsberg by marriage
Werl-Werl	County	n/a	n/a	c. 1070: Partitioned from Werl; 1102: Extinct; to the Archbishopric of Cologne
Werle	Principality	n/a	n/a	c. 1235: Partitioned from Mecklenburg; 1282: Partitioned into Werle-Güstrow and Werle-Parchim; 1307: Reunited by Werle-Parchim; 1316: Partitioned into Werle-Güstrow and Werle-Goldberg; 1425: Reunited by Werle-Güstrow; 1436: Extinct; 1/3 to Mecklenburg-Schwerin, 2/3 to Mecklenburg-Stargard
Werle-Goldberg	1316: Principality	n/a	n/a	1316: Partitioned from Werle; 1375: Extinct; to Werle-Waren
Werle-Güstrow	Principality	n/a	n/a	1282: Partitioned from Werle; 1307: Extinct; to Werle-Parchim; 1316: Partitioned from Werle; 1347: Partitioned into itself and Werle-Waren; 1425: Renamed to Werle
Werle-Parchim	Principality	n/a	n/a	1282: Partitioned from Werle; 1307: Renamed to Werle
Werle-Waren	Principality	n/a	n/a	1347: Partitioned from Werle-Güstrow; 1425: Extinct; to Werle-Güstrow
Wernigerode	County	Upp Sax	WT	1121: First mentioned 1268: Made fief of Brandenburg; 1381: Made fief of Magdeburg; 1429: Extinct; to Stolberg
Wertheim	County	Franc	FR	1132: Established as a branch of the Reginbodons; 1329: Acquired part of Breuberg; 1497: Acquired all of Breuberg; 1407: Partitioned into Wertheim-Breuberg and Wertheim-Wertheim; 1509: Reunited by Wertheim-Breuberg; 1556: Extinct; to Stolberg-Königstein; 1574: To Löwenstein-Wertheim; 1806: Divided between Baden and Bavaria
Wertheim-Breuberg	County	Franc	FR	1407: Partitioned from Wertheim; 1482: Partitioned into itself and Wertheim-Freudenberg; 1509: Renamed to Wertheim
Wertheim-Freudenberg	County	Franc	FR	1482: Partitioned from Wertheim-Breuberg; 1509: Extinct; to Wertheim-Breuberg
Wertheim-Wertheim	County	n/a	n/a	1407: Partitioned from Wertheim; 1497: Extinct; to Wertheim-Breuberg
Westphalia	Duchy	n/a	n/a	Originally part of the Stem Duchy of Saxony; 1180: To the Archbishopric of Cologne; 1202: Acquired Werl; 1368: Acquired Arnsberg; 1803: To Hesse-Darmstadt; 1815: To Prussia
Westerburg	Lordship	n/a	n/a	1198: First mentioned; to Leiningen; 1209: First mentioned as territory of Runkel after transfer by marriage 1227: To Runkel-Westerburg; 1467: To Leiningen-Westerburg; 1547: To Leiningen-Westerburg-Westerburg; 1597: To Leiningen-Westerburg-Schaumburg; 1698: To Leiningen-Westerburg-Altleiningen and Leiningen-Westerburg-Neuleiningen; 1806: To Berg; 1815: To Prussia
Wettenhausen	Abbacy	Swab	SP	1130: Abbey established unknown: Imperial immediacy 1803: To Bavaria; secularised and suppressed
Wetzlar	Imperial City	Upp Rhen	RH	1180: Free Imperial City; 1803: To the Archbishopric of Regensburg; 1810: To Frankfurt; 1815: To Prussia
Wiblingen	Abbacy	n/a	n/a	1093: Abbey established; to Kirchberg; 1504: Sold to Austria; 1701: Acquired autonomy 1805: To Bavaria; 1806: To Württemberg; secularised and suppressed
Wickrath (Wickerode; Wykradt)	Lordship	Low Rhen	WE	1105: First mentioned; to Are; 1144: To Are-Hochstaden; 1166: To Are-Wickrath; 1309: Extinct; to Guelders; 14th Century: To Broichhausen as fief of Guelders; 1482: To Hompesch as fief of Austria; 1488: Imperial immediacy 1502: To Quadt-Buschfeld; 1518: To Quadt-Wickrath; 1599: To Quadt-Wickrath-Schwanenberg; 1752: Joined the Westphalian Counts; 1794: To France; 1815: To Prussia
Wied	County	n/a	n/a	11th Century: First mentioned; gau counts of the Engersgau, fiefs of the County Palatine of the Rhine; 1190: Acquired Olbrück; 1244: 1st Extinct; divided between Isenburg-Wied and Eppstein; 1306: Eppstein share sold to Virneburg; 1462: Isenburg-Wied extinct; to Runkel-Runkel who took the name Wied-Runkel
Wied-Neuwied; Count of Wied & Isenburg, Lord of Runkel	County; 1784: Principality	Low Rhen	WE	1533: Partitioned from Wied-Runkel; 1535: Extinct; to Wied-Runkel; 1581: Partitioned from Wied-Runkel; 1631: Partitioned into itself and Wied-Runkel; 1784: HRE Prince; 1806: To the Grand Duchy of Hesse (Hesse-Darmstadt)
Wied-Runkel; Count of Wied, Isenburg & Kriechingen, Lord of Runkel, Kriching-Püttlingen and Rollingen	County; 1791: Principality	Low Rhen	WE	1454: Renamed from Runkel-Runkel after acquisition of half of Wied; 1462: Acquired remainder of Wied; 1493: Acquired Moers; 1519: Moers to Neuenahr-Bedburg; 1533: Partitioned into itself and Wied-Neuwied; 1581: Partitioned into Wied-Neuwied and itself 1612: Extinct; to Wied-Neuwied; 1631: Partitioned from Wied-Neuwied; 1709: Extinct; to Maximilian Henry of Wied-Neuwied; 1791: HRE Prince; 1806: To Berg (Runkel) and the Grand Duchy of Hesse (Hesse-Darmstadt); 1815: Runkel to Prussia
Wiesensteig	Lordship	Swab	SC	12th Century: To Helfenstein; 1356: To Helfenstein-Wiesensteig; 1627: Divided between Fürstenberg-Messkirch, Leuchtenberg, and Oettingen-Baldern; 1642: Leuchtenberg, and Oettingen shares sold to Bavaria; 1752: Fürstenberg share sold to Bavaria; 1806: To Württemberg
Wiesentfels	Lordship	n/a	n/a	1333: To Giech as fief of Bamberg; 1412: 2/3 given to Schaumberg as fief of Bamberg; 1632: To Salis; 1654: To Giech; 1806: To Bavaria
Wiesentheid	Lordship	Franc	FR	Originally to Würzburg; 1681: To Dernbach; 1697: To Hatzfeld-Gleichen; 1701: To Schönborn-Eschbach by marriage 1711: To Schönborn-Buchheim; 1717: To Schönborn-Wiesentheid; 1806: To Bavaria; then Würzburg; 1814: To Bavaria
Wildgraviate	Wildgraviate	n/a	n/a	11th Century: Gau counts in the Nahegau assumed the title Wildgrave; 1113: Partitioned into Veldenz and itself c. 1148: Partitioned into itself and Baumburg; 1258: Partitioned into Kyrburg and Dhaun
Wildenberg	Barony	n/a	n/a	1126: First mentioned 1257: Acquired advocacy of Disentis Abbey; 1261: Acquired advocacy of Pfäfers Abbey, Freudenberg and Wartenstein; 1302: Extinct in male line 1334: Extinct; to Werdenberg-Heiligenberg by marriage
Wildenburg in Eifel	Lordship	n/a	n/a	c. 1195: First mentioned; to the younger line of Reifferscheid; 1328: Extinct in male line 1335: Sold to Jülich
Wildenburg in Wildenburger Land	Lordship	n/a	n/a	1220: Partitioned from Arenberg; 1418: Extinct; to Hatzfeld; 1794: To Mainz; 1806: To Berg; 1815: To Prussia
Wildeshausen	County	n/a	n/a	1143: Partitioned from Oldenburg; 1199: Partitioned into Bruchhausen and itself 1270: Extinct; to the Archbishopric of Bremen
Wimpfen	Imperial City	Swab	SW	c. 1300: Free Imperial City; 1803: To Baden; then to Hesse-Darmstadt
Windisch-Graetz	Lordship; 1682: County	Swab	FR / SW	1218: First mentioned; knights in the service of Andechs-Meran; 1251: To the Patriarchate of Aquileia; 1270: To Styria; 1341: To Patriarchate of Aquileia; 1401: To Styria; 1629: Relocated to Bohemia; 1682: HRE Count; 1802: Partitioned into Windisch-Graetz Elder Line and Windisch-Graetz Younger Line
Windisch-Graetz Elder Line	County; 1804: Principality	Swab	FR / SW	1802: Partitioned from Windisch-Graetz; 1804: Acquired Eglofs; 1806: Eglofs to Württemberg
Windisch-Graetz Younger Line	County	n/a	n/a	1802: Partitioned from Windisch-Graetz
Windsheim	Imperial City	Franc	SW	By 1248: Free Imperial City; 1802: To Bavaria; 1804: To Prussia; 1807: To France; 1810: To Bavaria
Winneburg	Lordship; 1652: County	Low Rhen	WE	13th Century: First mentioned 1362: Acquired Beilstein as fief of Trier; 1488: To Trier; 1503: Restored; 1637: Extinct; to Trier; 1652: To Metternich-Winneburg and Beilstein; 1794: To France; To Prussia
Winterstetten	Lordship	n/a	n/a	1214: Partitioned from Waldburg; 1243: Extinct; to Schmalegg by marriage 1331: To Austria; 1438: To Waldburg
Wittgenstein	County	n/a	n/a	1174: First mentioned; to Battenburg; 1238: Partitioned from Battenburg; 1295: Made fief of Cologne; 1322: Acquired Berleburg; 1361: Extinct; to Sayn-Homburg who took the name Sayn-Wittgenstein
Wolfratshausen	County	n/a	n/a	c. 1030: Partitioned from Diessen; 1073: Acquired Thanning; 1121: Acquired Tegernsee; 1157: Extinct; to Andechs
Wolfstein	Lordship; 1522: Barony; 1673: County	Bav	FR	1290: Renamed from Sulzbürg; 1305: Acquired Allersberg as fief of Eichstätt; 1322: Partitioned into Wolfstein-Wolfstein, Wolfstein-Sulzbürg and Wolfstein-Allersberg; 1516: Reunited by Wolfstein-Sulzbürg; 1522: HRE Baron; Bavarian Circle; 1673: HRE Count; Franconian Bench of Counts; 1740: Extinct; divided between Hohenlohe-Kirchberg and Giech; 1768: Sold to Bavaria
Wolfstein-Allersberg	Lordship	n/a	n/a	1322: Partitioned from Wolfstein as fief of Bavaria-Landshut; 1474: Extinct; Allersberg to Bavaria-Landshut, rest to Wolfstein-Sulzbürg
Wolfstein-Sulzbürg	Lordship	n/a	n/a	1322: Partitioned from Wolfstein; 1353: Imperial immediacy 1403: Acquired Niedersulzbürg; 1420: Partitioned into itself and Wolfstein-Untersulzbürg; 1516: Renamed to Wolfstein
Wolfstein-Untersulzbürg	Lordship	n/a	n/a	1420: Partitioned from Wolfstein-Sulzbürg; 1516: Extinct; to Wolfstein-Sulzbürg
Wolfstein-Wolfstein	Lordship	n/a	n/a	1322: Partitioned from Wolfstein; 1346: Acquired Pyrbaum; 1353: Imperial immediacy 1362: Acquired Mühlhausen; 1383: Extinct; divided between Wolfstein-Sulzbürg and Wolfstein-Allersberg
Worms	Bishopric	Upp Rhen	EC	346: Diocese first mentioned 861: Imperial immediacy 1793: Left bank to France; 1803: Right bank to Hesse-Darmstadt
Worms	Imperial City	Upp Rhen	RH	1074: Free Imperial City; 1792: To France; 1815: To the Grand Duchy of Hesse (Hesse-Darmstadt)
Wurmbrand-Stuppach; HRE Count of Wurmbrand-Stuppach, Baron of Steyersberg, Reittenau	Lordship; 1607: Barony; 1701: County	n/a	FC	1194: First mentioned; fief of Styria; 1607: HRE Baron; 1701: HRE Count; 1726: Joined the Franconian Counts (personalist)
Württemberg (Wirtemberg; Wurttemberg)	Duchy	Swab	PR	1081: Lordship first mentioned 1135: HRE Count; 1251: Acquired Stuttgart; 1381: Acquired Teck; 1442: Partitioned into Württemberg-Urach and Württemberg-Stuttgart; 1482: Reunited by Württemberg-Urach; 1495: HRE Duke; 1519: Württemberg proper to Austria; 1526: Württemberg-Mömpelgard split off 1534: Restored; 1553: Partitioned into itself and Württemberg-Mömpelgard; 1593: Inherited by Württemberg-Mömpelgard; 1617: Partitioned into itself, Württemberg-Mömpelgard, Württemberg-Brenz-Weiltingen, Württemberg-Neuenbürg and Württemberg-Neustadt; 1649: Appanages Württemberg-Neuenbürg and Württemberg-Neustadt created 1677: Appanage Württemberg-Winnental created 1733: Inherited by Württemberg-Winnental; 1803: HRE Elector; 1806: King
Württemberg-Bernstadt	Duchy	n/a	n/a	1672: Partitioned from Württemberg-Oels; 1697: Inherited and renamed to Württemberg-Oels; Bernstadt to Charles of Württemberg-Juliusburg; 1745: Extinct; to Württemberg-Oels
Württemberg-Brenz-Weiltingen	Duchy	n/a	n/a	1617: Partitioned from Württemberg; 1649: Side line Württemberg-Oels founded 1705: Extinct; to Württemberg
Württemberg-Juliusburg	Duchy	n/a	n/a	1672: Partitioned from Württemberg-Oels; 1697: Acquired Württemberg-Bernstadt; Juliusburg to Württemberg-Oels
Württemberg-Mömpelgard (Württemberg-Montbéliard)	County; 1526: Principality; 1553: Duchy	n/a	n/a	1473: Partitioned from Württemberg-Urach; 1482: To Württemberg-Urach; 1526: Partitioned from Württemberg; 1534: To Württemberg; 1553: Partitioned from Württemberg; 1593: Inherited Württemberg; 1617: Partitioned from Württemberg; 1723: Extinct; to Württemberg
Württemberg-Neuenbürg	Duchy	n/a	n/a	1617: Partitioned from Württemberg; 1622: Extinct; to Württemberg; 1649: Appanage created within Württemberg; 1671: Extinct; appanage abolished
Württemberg-Neuenstadt	Duchy	n/a	n/a	1617: Partitioned from Württemberg; 1631: Extinct; to Württemberg; 1649: Appanage created within Württemberg; 1679: Acquired Gochsheim; 1742: Extinct; appanage abolished
Württemberg-Oels	Duchy	n/a	n/a	1649: Line established when Silvius Nimrod of Württemberg-Brenz-Weiltingen acquired Oels by marriage 1672: Partitioned into itself, Württemberg-Bernstadt and Württemberg-Juliusburg; 1697: Extinct; to Charles Ulrich I of Württemberg-Bernstadt; 1704: Partitioned into itself and Württemberg-Wilhelminenort; 1805: Extinct; to Frederick William of Brunswick-Wolfenbüttel
Württemberg-Stuttgart	County	n/a	n/a	1442: Partitioned from Württemberg; 1482: Sovereignty surrendered to Württemberg-Urach in exchange for succession to the united state
Württemberg-Urach	County	n/a	n/a	1442: Partitioned from Württemberg; 1444: Acquired Montbéliard; 1473: Partitioned into itself and Württemberg-Mömpelgard; 1482: Renamed to Württemberg
Württemberg-Wilhelminenort	Duchy	n/a	n/a	1704: Partitioned from Württemberg-Oels; 1744: Inherited Württemberg-Oels; appanage abolished
Württemberg-Winnental	Duchy	n/a	n/a	1677: Appanage created in Württemberg; 1733: Inherited Württemberg; appanage abolished
Würzburg	Bishopric	Franc	EC	743: Diocese established 1168: Acquired East Franconia; 1441: HRE Duke; 1803: To Bavaria; 1805: To the Grand Duchy of Würzburg; 1814: To Bavaria
Würzburg	Electorate; 1806: Grand Duchy	Franc	EL	1805: Former Bishopric of Würzburg given to the Elector of Salzburg in exchange for Salzburg; 1806: Grand Duke; 1814: To Bavaria
