= Waldburg-Zeil =

Territory in the Holy Roman Empire

Coordinates: 47°52′N 10°0′E

Stewardship of Waldburg-Zeil → County of Waldburg-Zeil → Principality of Waldburg-Zeil Truchsessenamt Waldburg-Zeil → Grafschaft Waldburg-Zeil → Fürstentum Waldburg-Zeil
- 1589–1806
- Coat of arms
- Status: State of the Holy Roman Empire
- Capital: Zeil
- Common languages: Alemannic German
- Government: Principality
- Historical era: Middle Ages
  - Partitioned from Waldburg-Wolfegg-Zeil: 1589
  - Raised to County: 1628
  - Annexed half of Waldburg-Waldburg: 1660
  - Partitioned to create Waldburg-Wurzach: 1674
  - Raised to principality: 1803
  - Mediatised to Kgdm Württemberg: 1806
Preceded by	Succeeded by
Waldburg-Wolfegg-Zeil	Kingdom of Württemberg

Coat of arms of the Counts of Waldburg-Zeil

Waldburg-Zeil was a County and later Principality within Holy Roman Empire, ruled by the House of Waldburg, located in southeastern Baden-Württemberg, Germany, located around Schloss Zeil, near Leutkirch im Allgäu.

== History ==
Waldburg-Zeil was a partition of Waldburg-Wolfegg-Zeil. Originally ruled by Truchesses (stewards), Waldburg-Zeil was elevated to a County in 1628, and a Principality in 1803 shortly before being mediatised to Württemberg in 1806.

In 1674, Waldburg-Zeil was partitioned between itself and Waldburg-Wurzach. Count Francis Anthony inherited Waldburg-Trauchburg in 1772 (the districts of Friedburg and Scheer were later sold to Thurn und Taxis in 1785), and Steward Froben and Steward Henry of Waldburg-Wolfegg partitioned Waldburg-Waldburg after the death of Steward Gebhard.

== Rulers of Waldburg-Zeil ==
=== Stewards of Waldburg-Zeil (1589–1628) ===
- Froben (1589–1614)
- John James I (1614–28)

=== Counts of Waldburg-Zeil (1628–1803) ===
- John James I (1628–74)
- Paris James (1674–84)
- John Christopher (1684–1717)
- John James II (1717–50)
- Francis Anthony (1750–90)
- Maximilian Wunibald (1790–1803)

=== Princes of Waldburg-Zeil-Trauchburg (1803–1806) ===
- Maximilian Wunibald (1803–06)

The present prince is Erich, Fürst von Waldburg zu Zeil und Trauchburg (born 1962), the only son of Georg, Prince von Waldburg zu Zeil und Trauchburg (1928-2015) and Princess Marie Gabrielle of Bavaria (b. 1931), daughter of Albrecht, Duke of Bavaria. In 1988 he married Mathilde, Duchess of Württemberg, daughter of Carl, Duke of Württemberg and Princess Diane of Orléans. As Erich has five daughters, his heir presumptive is his first cousin, Count Clemens von Waldburg-Zeil (b. 1960), married to Princess Georgina of Liechtenstein, who has three sons.

- Maximilian Wunibald, 1st Prince 1803-1818 (1750-1818)
  - Franz-Thäddaus, 2nd Prince 1818-1845 (1778-1845)
    - Constantin Maximilian, 3rd Prince 1845-1862 (1807-1862)
      - Wilhelm, 4th Prince 1862-1906 (1835-1906)
        - Georg, 5th Prince 1906-1918 (1867-1918)
          - Erich August, 6th Prince 1918-1953 (1899-1953) - Princess Monika of Löwenstein-Wertheim-Rosenberg
            - Georg, 7th Prince 1953-2015 (1928-2015) - married to Princess Marie Gabrielle of Bavaria, daughter of Albrecht, Duke of Bavaria.
              - Erich, 8th Prince 2015–present (b.1962) - married to Duchess Mathilde of Württemberg, daughter of Carl, Duke of Württemberg
            - Count Aloysius (1933-2014)
              - Count Clemens (b.1960)
                - Count Eduard (b.1985)
                - Count Maximilian (b.1992)
                - Count Constantin (b.1994)

=== Lustenau-Hohenems branch ===
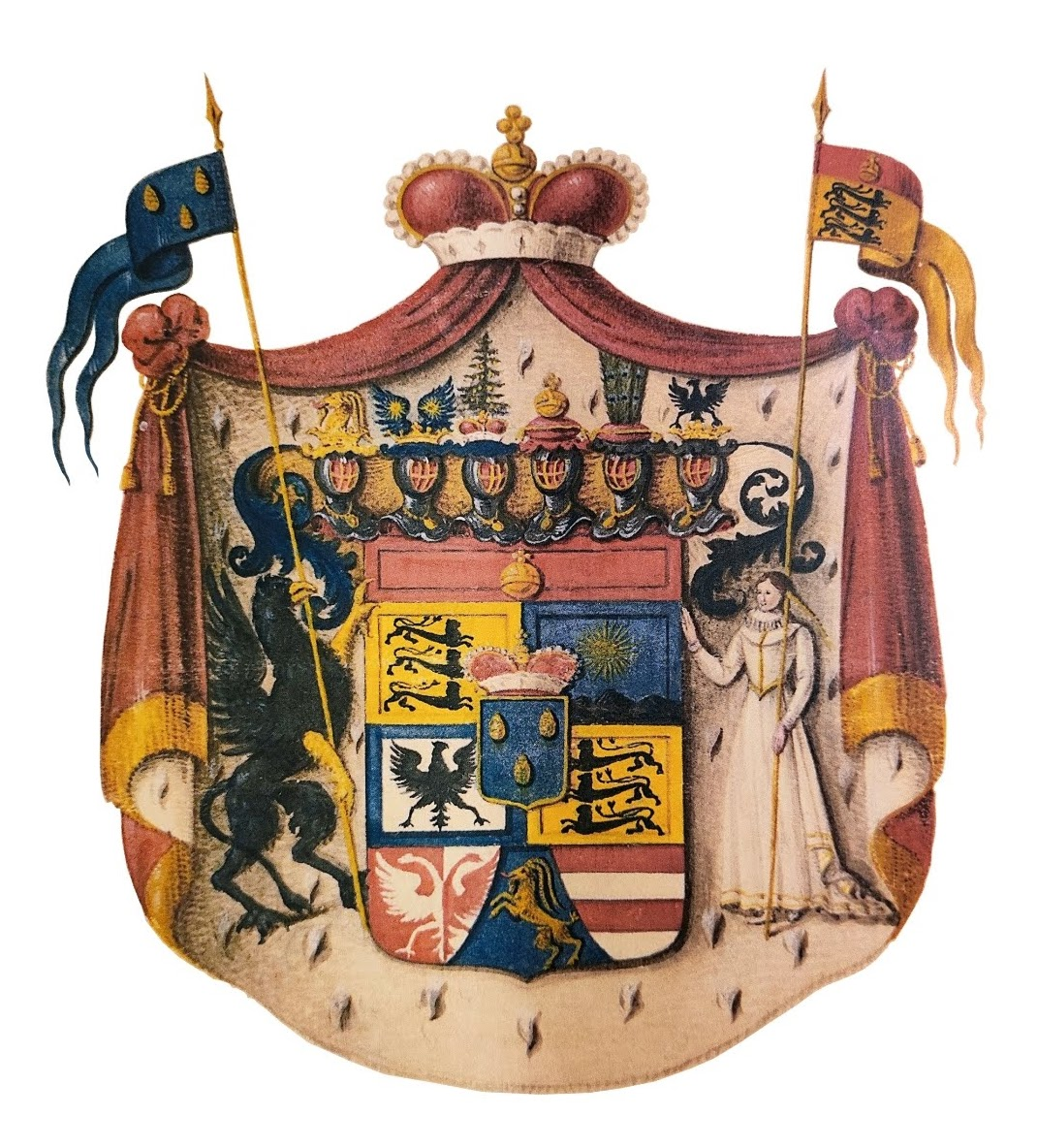
Coat of arms of Waldburg-Zeil-Lustenau-Hohenems branch of the House of Waldburg (1817)

In 1779 a collateral branch of the Counts of Waldburg-Zeil came into possession of the sovereign county of Lustenau by marriage. Countess Maria Walburga Cajetana von Harrach zu Rohrau und Thannhausen (1756–1828) inherited the county from her mother, Countess Maria Rebekka (1742–1806), the last living member of an ancient House of Hohenems. In 1813, Maria Walburga's husband, Count Clemens of Waldburg-Zeil-Trauchburg (1799–1869), whom she married in 1779, bought off the Counties of Lustenau and Hohenems from his wife and thus became the Count of Waldburg-Zeil-Lustenau-Hohenems, in his own right. Since all their four sons had already died, in the same year, he adopted his nephew, Count Maximilian Clemens (1799–1868) as his universal heir. During German mediatisation, when redistribution and reshaping of territorial holdings took place between 1802 and 1814, the former Imperial county of Lustenau was mediatized to Bavaria in 1806 and became part of Austria in 1830.

The present Head of this branch of the family is Count Franz Josef von Waldburg-Zeil-Hohenems (b. 1962), an elder son of Count Franz Josef von Waldburg-Zeil-Hohenems (b. 1927) by his wife, Countess Priscilla von Schönborn-Wiesentheid (b. 1934). He is married to Countess Stephanie Marie Catherine Eugenie (Nini) von Blanckenstein (b. 1966) and they have four daughters.
