= Georg, 7th Prince of Waldburg-Zeil =

Maria Georg Konstantin Ignatius Antonius Felix Augustinus Wunibald Kilian Bonifacius, Prince of Waldburg zu Zeil und Trauchburg (5 June 1928 - 2 December 2015) was a German entrepreneur and head of the Zeil line of the former Princely House of Waldburg. Born with the official surname Count of Waldburg zu Zeil und Trauchburg, the entrepreneur called himself Georg, Prince of Waldburg zu Zeil und Trauchburg after the death of his father.

== Early life ==
Georg was born on 5 June 1928 in Würzburg. He was the son of Erich, 6th Prince of Waldburg-Zeil-Trauchburg (1899–1953) and Princess Monika of Löwenstein-Wertheim-Rosenberg (1905–1992). He had six younger siblings, including Alois, Count of Waldburg-Zeil, a CDU member of the Bundestag (and father of Clemens, Count of Waldburg-Zeil), Princess Josefine von Lobkowicz, and his brother, Eberhard, Count of Waldburg zu Zeil and Trauchburg.

Waldburg-Zeil attended the Kolleg St. Blasien boarding school until it was closed by the National Socialists in 1939. After the end of the war, he obtained his Abitur (university entrance qualification) and studied at the Eberhard Karls University of Tübingen, where he graduated with a degree in economics in 1951.

== Career ==
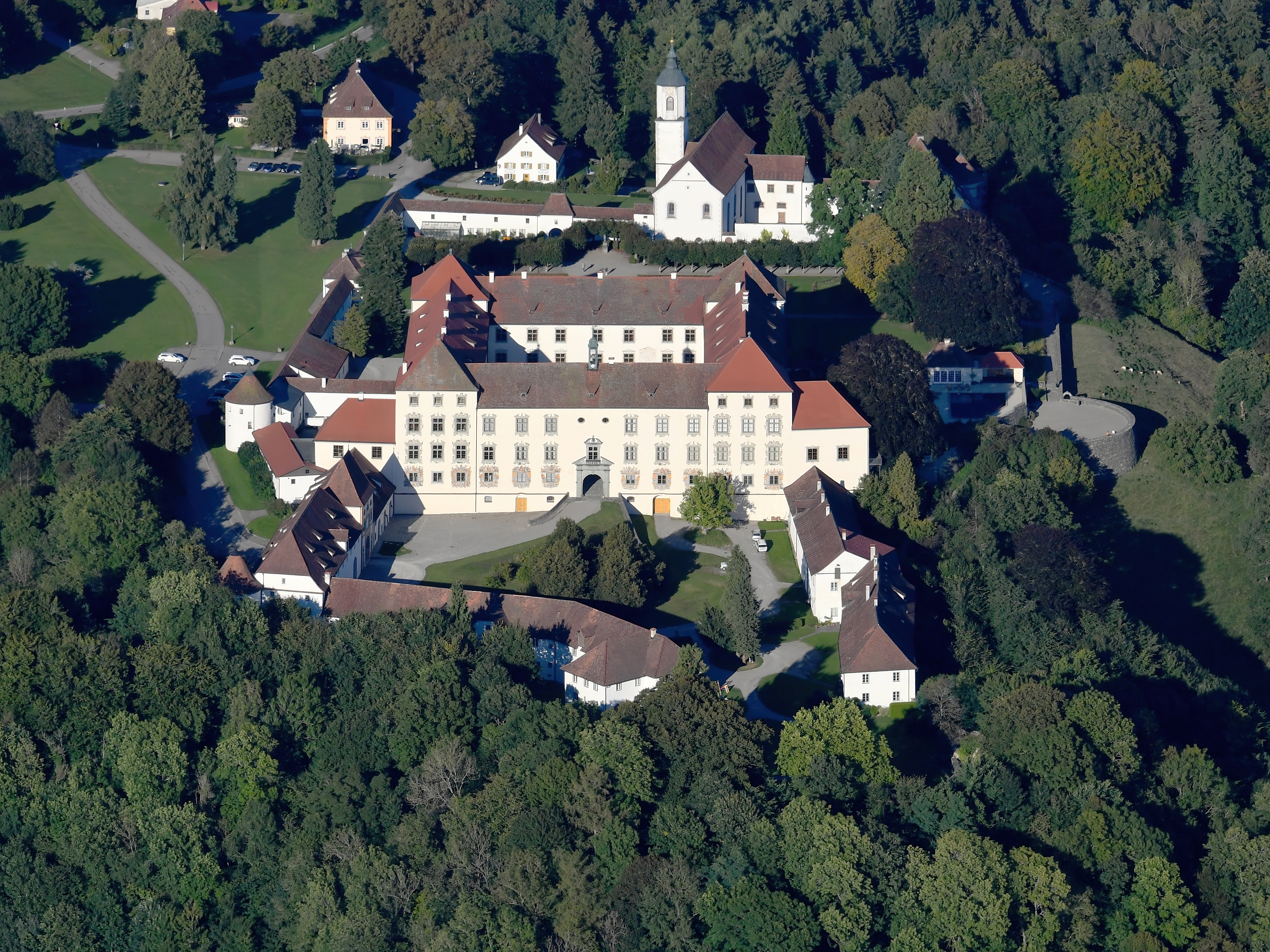
Aerial view of Zeil Castle

Upon the death of his father in a car accident on 24 May 1953, he took over all of his father's businesses, two-thirds of which were agriculture and forestry in the Allgäu region, and one-third industrial in southern Germany. He also succeeded his father as head of the former Princely House of Waldburg.

In the 1950s he was one of the most important donors to the controversial right-wing conservative circle of the Western Action, deputy chairman of the Western Academy and publisher of its journal Neues Abendland. Also in the 1950s, Georg von Waldburg-Zeil, like his brother Alois, was a member of the conservative European Documentation and Information Centre (CEDI).

In the course of the post-war land reform of the West German state of Württemberg-Hohenzollern initiated by the French post-World War II occupation zone in 1949, the House of Waldburg was one of the three longest-resistant opponents. It delayed the reform until a compromise was reached with the newly formed state of Baden-Württemberg in 1952 (under Minister-President Hans Filbinger) in 1969, as a result of which Georg von Waldburg-Zeil received 750,000 DM instead of the previously demanded 2.88 million DM in compensation; in return, the state waived the return of 138 hectares of land on the condition that it be leased to farmers for twelve years.

=== Business interests ===
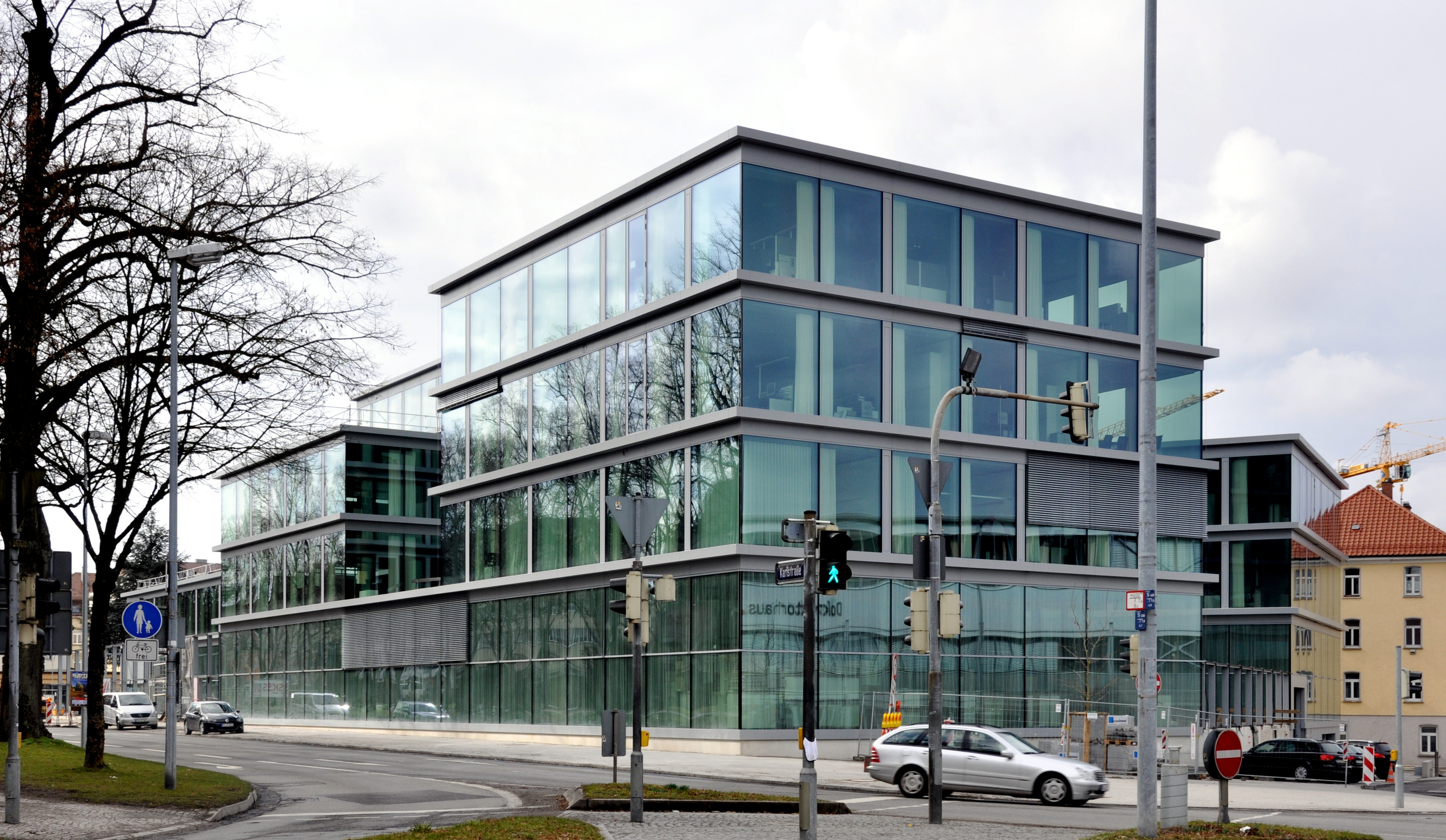
Schwäbische Zeitung Headquarters in Ravensburg

Waldburg-Zeil and his family owned approximately 10,000 hectares of land, primarily used for forestry and agriculture, which made them one of the largest private landowners in Germany.

He was also a publisher of the Schwäbische Zeitung through the media house Schwäbischer Verlag GmbH & Co. KG and was involved in the private broadcasters Radio 7, Radio Seefunk, three regional television stations and numerous other subsidiaries. Since the 1960s he was co-editor of the Allgäuer Zeitung and the Memminger Zeitung.

The Waldburg-Zeil family also operates the regional airfield Leutkirch-Unterzeil, the Holzhof Zeil (a forestry company), and several casinos, the Hochgratbahn (an aerial cable car in Steibis) and, since 1958, a chain of rehabilitation clinics and health resorts known as the Waldburg-Zeil Clinics, which employ with more than 3,000 people.

Since the late 1970s, he owned the Estancia "San Jorge", the Argentine luxury winter sports resort of San Martín de los Andes, along with several thousand hectares of coniferous plantations, including 2,000 hectares reserved for red deer hunting. The Estancia's neighboring estates belong to the German industrialists Ruprecht von Haniel and Wolf von Buchholtz (together they own over 15,000 hectares of land).

The family also formerly owned (together with the Feldmühle Group) the Baienfurt paper mill near Ravensburg, which was sold to Stora Enso in 1990 before closing at the end of 2008.

Waldburg-Zeil was a member of the advisory boards of the Landesbank Baden-Württemberg, Germany's biggest state-backed landesbank lender, Deutsche Bank and served as President of the German Aero Club.

== Personal life ==
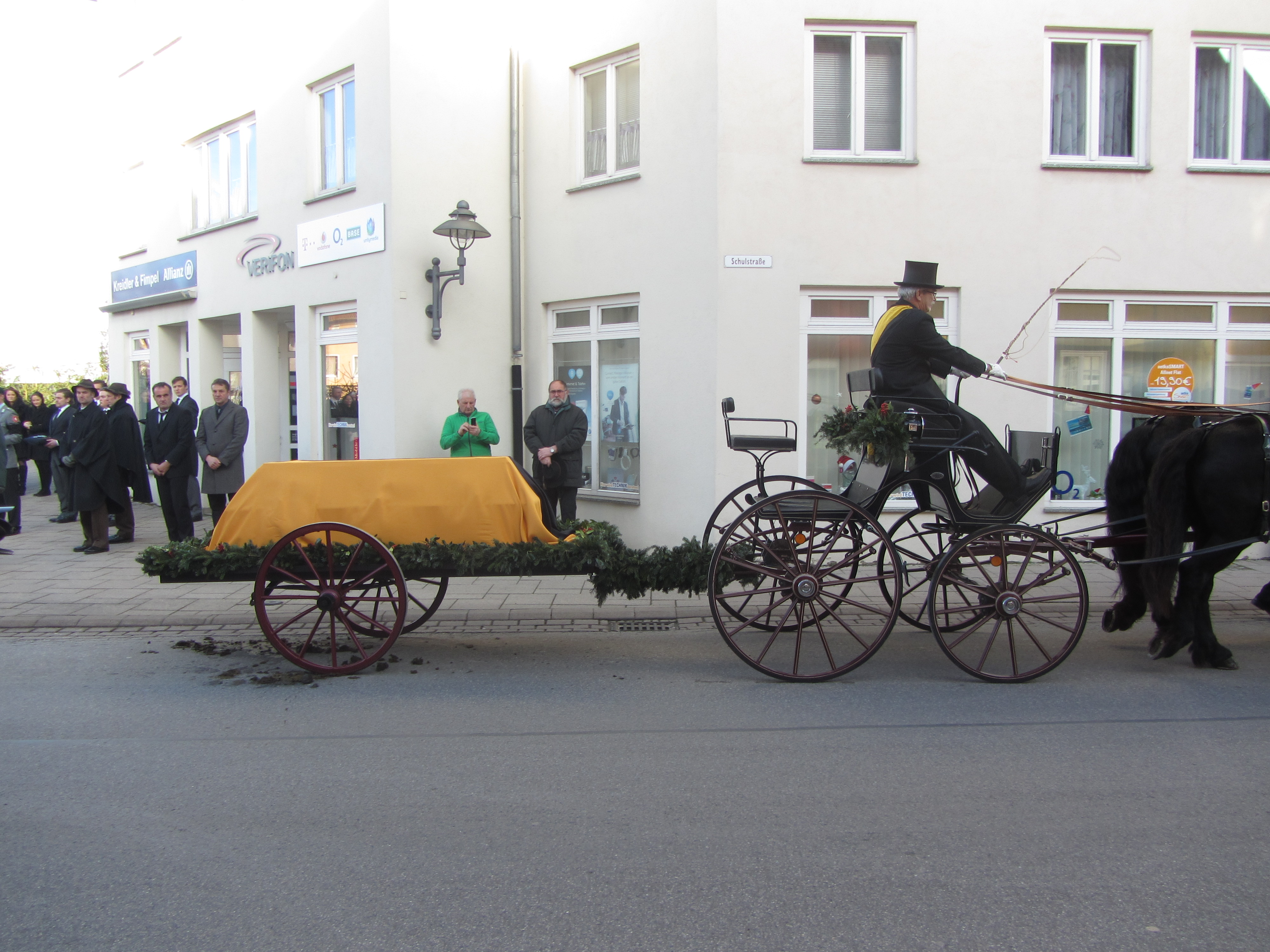
Funeral procession of Prince George, 2015

On 23 October 1957 in Munich, Georg von Waldburg-Zeil married to Princess Marie Gabrielle of Bavaria (b. 1931), eldest daughter of Albert of Bavaria, the son of Rupprecht, the last Bavarian Crown Prince, by his first wife, Countess Maria Draskovich of Trakostjan. Together, they lived at Zeil Castle near Leutkirch im Allgäu, and were the parents of five daughters and a son, including:

- Maria Walburga, Countess von Waldburg zu Zeil und Trauchburg (b. 1958), who married Baron Carl von Lerchenfeld in 1986.
- Marie Gabriele, Countess von Waldburg zu Zeil und Trauchburg (b. 1959), who married Count Bernard de Monseignat in 2004.
- Maria Monika, Countess von Waldburg zu Zeil und Trauchburg (b. 1961), who married Count Christoph Schenk von Stauffenberg in 1987.
- Erich, 8th Prince von Waldburg zu Zeil und Trauchburg (b. 1962), who married to Duchess Mathilde of Württemberg, a daughter of Carl, Duke of Württemberg and Princess Diane d'Orléans (the daughter of Prince Henri, Count of Paris, and Princess Isabelle of Orléans-Braganza), in 1988.
- Maria Adelheid, Countess von Waldburg zu Zeil und Trauchburg (b. 1964), who married Count Max Emanuel von Rechberg und Rothenlöwen zu Hohenrechberg in 1989.
- Maria Elisabeth, Countess von Waldburg zu Zeil und Trauchburg (b. 1966), who married Prince Engelbert of Croÿ, in 1990.

Prince Georg died on 2 December 2015 near Leutkirch im Allgäu and was succeeded by his only son, Erich, as head of the princely house.
