= Waldburg-Waldburg =

European polity

Coordinates: 47°46′N 9°43′E

County of Waldburg-Waldburg Grafschaft Waldburg-Waldburg
- 1589–1660
- Status: State of the Holy Roman Empire
- Capital: Waldburg
- Common languages: Alemannic German
- Government: Principality
- Historical era: Middle Ages
  - Partitioned from Waldburg-Wolfegg-Zeil: 1589 1589
  - Divided between W-Wolfegg and W-Zeil: 1660 1660
| Preceded by | Succeeded by |
| Waldburg-Wolfegg-Zeil | Waldburg-Wolfegg; Waldburg-Zeil |

Waldburg-Waldburg was a County ruled by the House of Waldburg, located in southeastern Baden-Württemberg, Germany. Waldburg-Waldburg was a partition of Waldburg-Wolfegg-Zeil and was divided between the other two parts of Waldburg-Wolfegg-Zeil — Waldburg-Wolfegg and Waldburg-Zeil — in 1660.
