= Waldburg-Wolfegg-Zeil =

Former principality in Baden-Württemberg

County of Waldburg-Wolfegg-Zeil Grafschaft Waldburg-Wolfegg-Zeil
- 1424–1589
- Status: State of the Holy Roman Empire
- Common languages: Alemannic German
- Government: Principality
- Historical era: Middle Ages
  - Partitioned from Waldburg: 1424
  - Partitioned in trine: 1589
Preceded by
Waldburg
Succeeded by
Waldburg-Waldburg
Waldburg-Wolfegg
Waldburg-Zeil

Waldburg-Wolfegg-Zeil was a County ruled by the House of Waldburg, located in southeastern Baden-Württemberg, Germany. Waldburg-Wolfegg-Zeil was a partition of Waldburg and was repartitioned in 1589, to create Waldburg-Waldburg, Waldburg-Wolfegg and Waldburg-Zeil.
