= Alois Graf von Waldburg-Zeil =

German politician

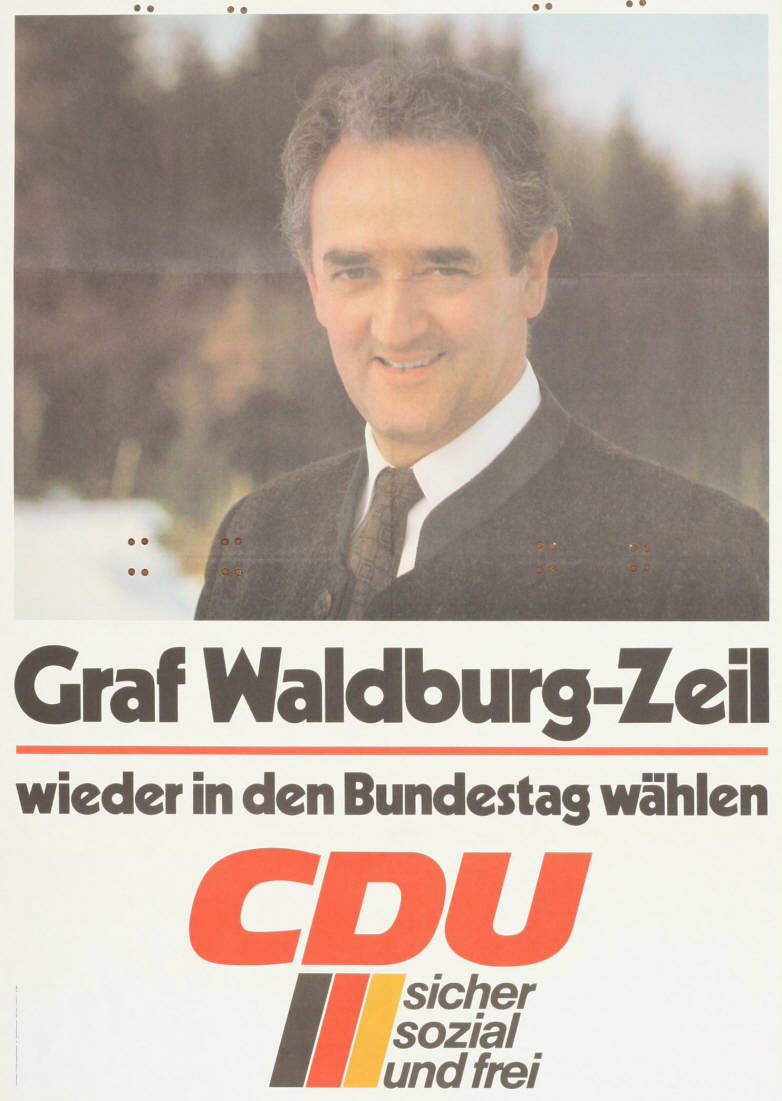

Member of the Bundestag; for Biberach
- In office 4 November 1980 – 26 October 1998
- Preceded by: Isidor Früh
- Succeeded by: Franz Romer

Personal details
- Born: 20 September 1933 Leutkirch im Allgäu, Germany
- Died: 14 December 2014 (aged 81)
- Party: Christian Democratic Union
- Spouse: Clarissa von Schönborn-Wiesentheid (m. 1956)
- Children: 5, including Clemens Graf
- Relatives: Waldburg family Schönborn family (by marriage)
- Education: Kolleg St. Blasien; University of Bonn

Alois Graf von Waldburg-Zeil (20 September 1933 – 14 December 2014) was a German politician.

== Early life ==
Alois was born on 20 September 1933 at Zeil Castle near Leutkirch im Allgäu. He was a son of Erich, 6th Prince of Waldburg-Zeil (1899–1953) and Princess Monika of Löwenstein-Wertheim-Rosenberg (1905–1992). His elder brother was Georg, 7th Prince of Waldburg-Zeil. He went to school at Kolleg St. Blasien. He studied politics and economics at the University of Bonn, the Sapienza University of Rome, and the Ludwig-Maximilians-Universität München.

== Career ==
Waldburg-Zeil was from 1980 to 1998 member of German Bundestag.

== Personal life ==
On 21 June 1956, he married Clarissa, Countess von Schönborn-Wiesentheid (b. 1936). Together, they were the parents of:

- Monika, Countess Wolff Metternich zur Gracht (b. 1957)
- Clemens, Count von Waldburg-Zeil (b. 1960), who married Princess Georgina of Liechtenstein, daughter of Prince Georg of Liechtenstein (son of Prince Alois of Liechtenstein and Archduchess Elisabeth Amalie of Austria) and Marie-Christine, Duchess of Württemberg (daughter of Philipp Albrecht, Duke of Württemberg, and Archduchess Helena of Austria), in 1985.
- Georg, Count von Waldburg-Zeil (1961–1989)
- Theresa Lenhart, Countess von Waldburg-Zeil (b. 1962)
- Franz-Anton, Count von Waldburg-Zeil (1964–1987)

Alois, Count von Waldburg-Zeil died on 14 December 2014.

== Awards ==
- Order of Merit of the Federal Republic of Germany
- National Order of the Lion from Senegal
- 1993: Order of Merit of Baden-Württemberg
- Order of St. Gregory the Great
- Order of Isabella the Catholic
