= Wolfstein (principality) =

Principality in Germany

Coordinates: 49.294°N 11.491°E

Lordship of Wolfstein Herrschaft Wolfstein
- 1217–1383
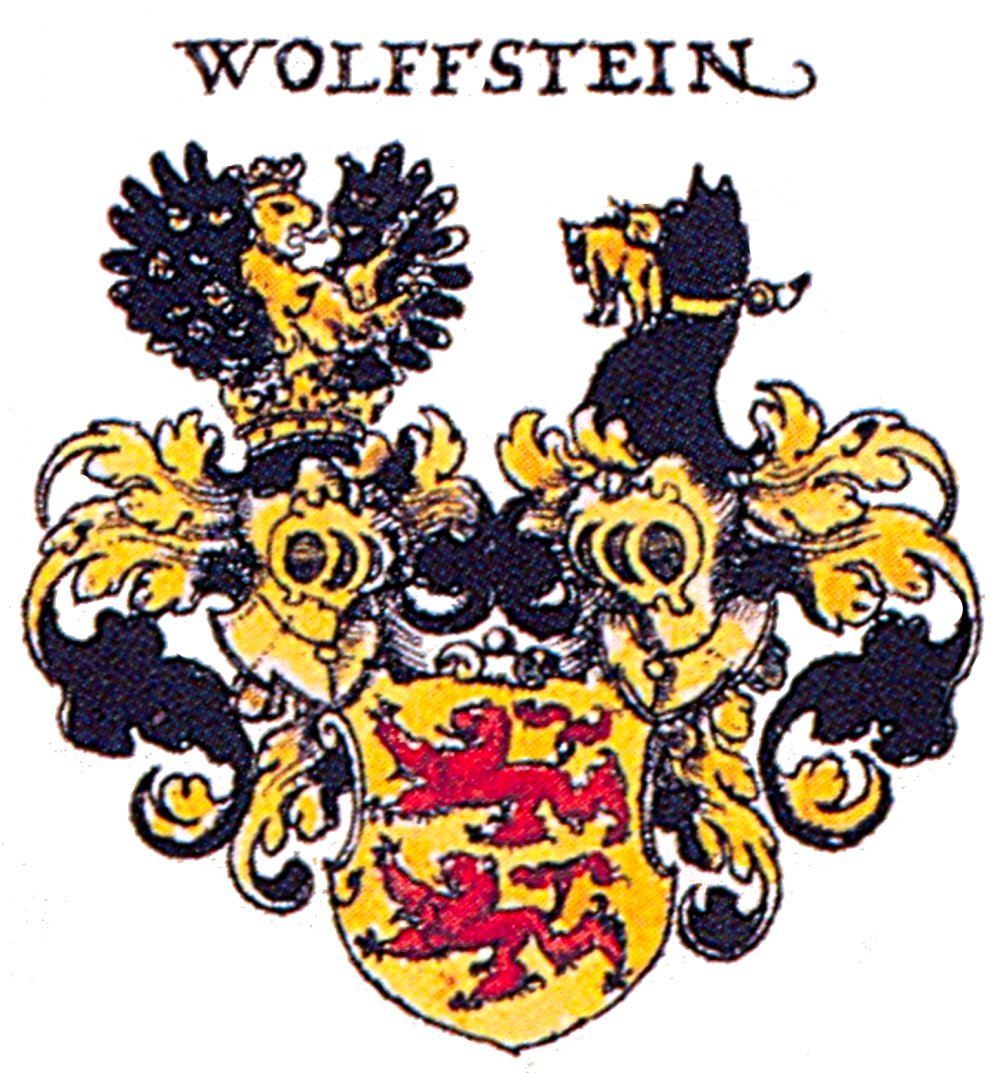
- Coat of arms
- Status: Principality
- Capital: Wolfstein (Neumarkt district)
- Historical era: Middle Ages
  - Established: 1217
  - Annexed by Allersberg: 1383
Preceded by	Succeeded by
Duchy of Franconia	Allersberg

Wolfstein (German pronunciation: [ˈvɔlfˌʃtaɪn]) was a minor principality in the Holy Roman Empire, centered on Wolfstein castle, near Neumarkt in der Oberpfalz.

Coat of arms of Wolfstein family

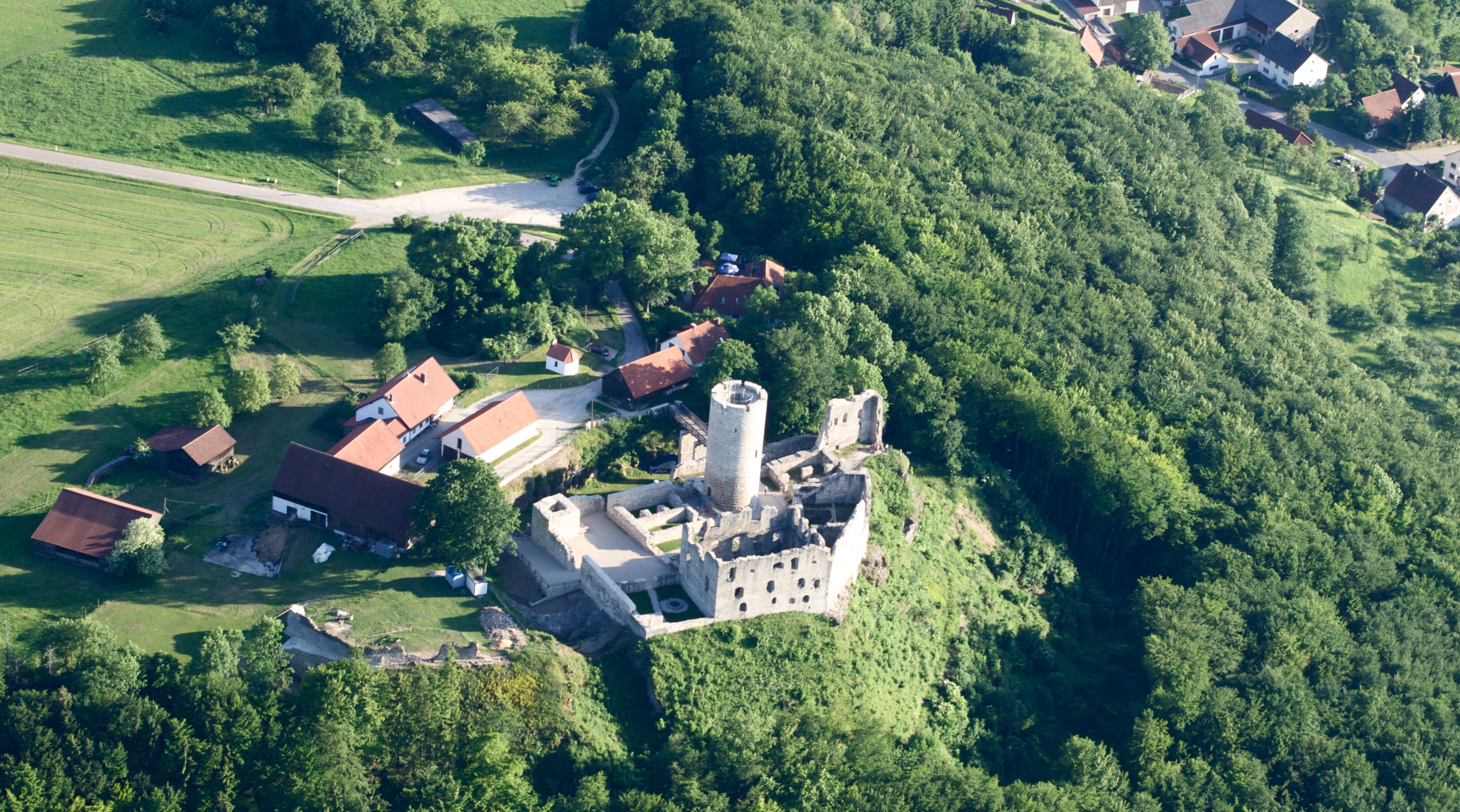
The ruins of Castle Wolfstein from the air
