= Clemens Graf von Waldburg-Zeil =

- Born: April 13, 1960 (age 66); Munich, Germany
- Occupations: Secretary General German Red Cross, Manager

Clemens Graf von Waldburg-Zeil (born April 13, 1960, in Munich, Germany) is a German entrepreneur, management consultant and former secretary general of the German Red Cross (GRC). He is a member of the House of Waldburg, and the eldest son of Alois Graf von Waldburg-Zeil und Trauchburg and his wife Clarissa (née Countess of Schönborn-Wiesentheid). Waldburg-Zeil lives in Vienna. He is married and has five adult children.

== Personal life ==
Clemens Graf von Waldburg-Zeil was born in Munich as the second of five children, and the eldest son of Alois Graf von Waldburg-Zeil und Trauchburg and his wife Clarissa (née Countess of Schönborn-Wiesentheid).

Since 1985, he is married to Princess Georgina von Liechtenstein, daughter of Dr.agr. Georg Prinz von und zu Liechtenstein (son of Prince Aloys of Liechtenstein and Archduchess Elisabeth Amalie of Austria) and Marie-Christine, Duchess of Württemberg (daughter of Philipp Albrecht, Duke of Württemberg, and his first wife Archduchess Helena of Austria). The couple has five children:

- Maria Annunciata of Treu (b.1988); married to Cecil von Treu (b. 1987)
- Maria Assunta (b.1990)
- Maximilian (b.1992)
- Constantin (b. 1994)
- Philippa (b.1996)

== Military service ==
Waldburg-Zeil is a first lieutenant in the German army reserve corps. He received his basic training as a paratrooper and completed his service in the 10th maintenance battalion in Sigmaringen.

== Education and professional career ==
Clemens Graf von Waldburg-Zeil is a graduate in business administration. He studied computer science and economics in Karlsruhe and Tübingen. From 1990 to 1995 he worked as a consultant and auditor for Dr. Lipfert GmbH (later merged with PricewaterhouseCoopers) in Stuttgart. During his tenure at Dr. Lipfert GmbH he also worked as a tax advisor and consultant for the company based in Berlin. Thereafter between 1995 and 2002 he managed the finance department of the catholic Archdiocese of Berlin where he was also responsible for managing established subsidiaries including publishing and real estate companies.

In 2003 Waldburg-Zeil accepted the position as secretary general (CEO, member of the board) of the German Red Cross based in Berlin. He initiated a reorganization of the GRC to define a strategic framework for the governance of the German Red Cross, a federal system with 400.000 volunteers, 140.000 employees and a gross budget of 6 bn euros per year. The process culminated in the adoption of new regulatory statutes in 2009. That same year, Waldburg-Zeil was appointed chairman of the board (CEO) of the German Red Cross. Waldburg-Zeil is also very active in the international aid community through the GRCs work in providing foreign aid internationally (present in fifty countries for disaster management and development assistance) () with a current budget of 50 Mio p.a.

His responsibilities include amongst others:

- Chairman (CEO) of the German Red Cross Foundations; board member of BAGFW (Bundesarbeitsgemeinschaft der freien Wohlfahrtspflege) – a political lobbying association of the six largest non-governmental providers of healthcare and social services);

- Board member of DV (Deutscher Verein für öffentliche und private Fürsorge) – the German Association for Public and Private Welfare;

- Member of the supervisory board for „Aktion Mensch”, the social lottery responsible for supporting disabled persons;

- Member of the board of “Stiftung Deutsche Behindertenhilfe”, one of Germans largest foundations (based on capitalisation).

== German Red Cross ==
At the beginning of 2003, Clemens Graf von Waldburg-Zeil took over the post of secretary-general of the German Red Cross (GRC). He assumed strategic responsibility over more than 5000 legally independent divisions of the GRC, which comprised over 400.000 volunteers, 150.000 employees and seven billion euros in annual turnover.

Prior to his tenure, the GRC faced financial and organisational challenges, owed largely to its federalist structure. Waldburg-Zeil was able to implement a set of process improvements and innovations. As a result, the capital reserves of the GRC Federal Associan could build up to 53 million euros, following years of losses prior to Waldburg-Zeil's tenure. His overall legacy to the GRC was one of transformation – towards a more uniform and integrated association capable of initiating far-reaching improvement processes.

Waldburg-Zeil's efforts culminated in a strategic initiative which he coined 2010^{plus}. It was designed to solve further financial and operational challenges through newly created processes, while overcoming federal barriers. The 2010^{plus} initiative was presented as a best practice template for large-scale change management projects in external non-profit organizations – such as the Protestant Church of Germany, and the Bertelmann foundation.

Under the leadership of Waldburg-Zeil, the GRC achieved an agreement on structured funding with the Ministry of Development, which reduced the GRC's dependency on obtaining funds in large scale emergency cases and helped establish long-term relationships with regions at risk.

After a reorganization of the GRC, Waldburg-Zeil was appointed chairman of the board in 2009.

In addition to achieving financial security, another major objective was to reestablish user rights to the names and symbols of the Red Cross. Under the initiative of the GRC, the Red Cross Act, which dates back to the Second World War, was completely modernized by the Ministry of Justice and approved by the Bundestag. All trademark rights to names and signs have been filed with the Trademark Court and all unlawful use of names and signs under trademark law have been prosecuted.

On top of this, he was instrumental in integrating the ambulance and disaster relief services, providing them with easier access to funding. In the course of modernizing the German civil service and disaster protection act, Waldburg-Zeil became involved with the Bundestag's forum for future public safety, which eventually became a standalone association.

== Voluntary community service ==
Waldburg-Zeil is a founding member of the “Forum on the Future of Public Safety and Security” which was started in 2007 by members of the then German parliament, business companies and civil society. He is co-author of the publication, “Greenbook public security”, wherein experts in the fields of politics, economics, business, science, social and disaster relief management present governmental solutions to theoretical scenarios with the aim of ensuring federal preparedness in the event of a national emergency.
