= Allersberg =

- Municipality
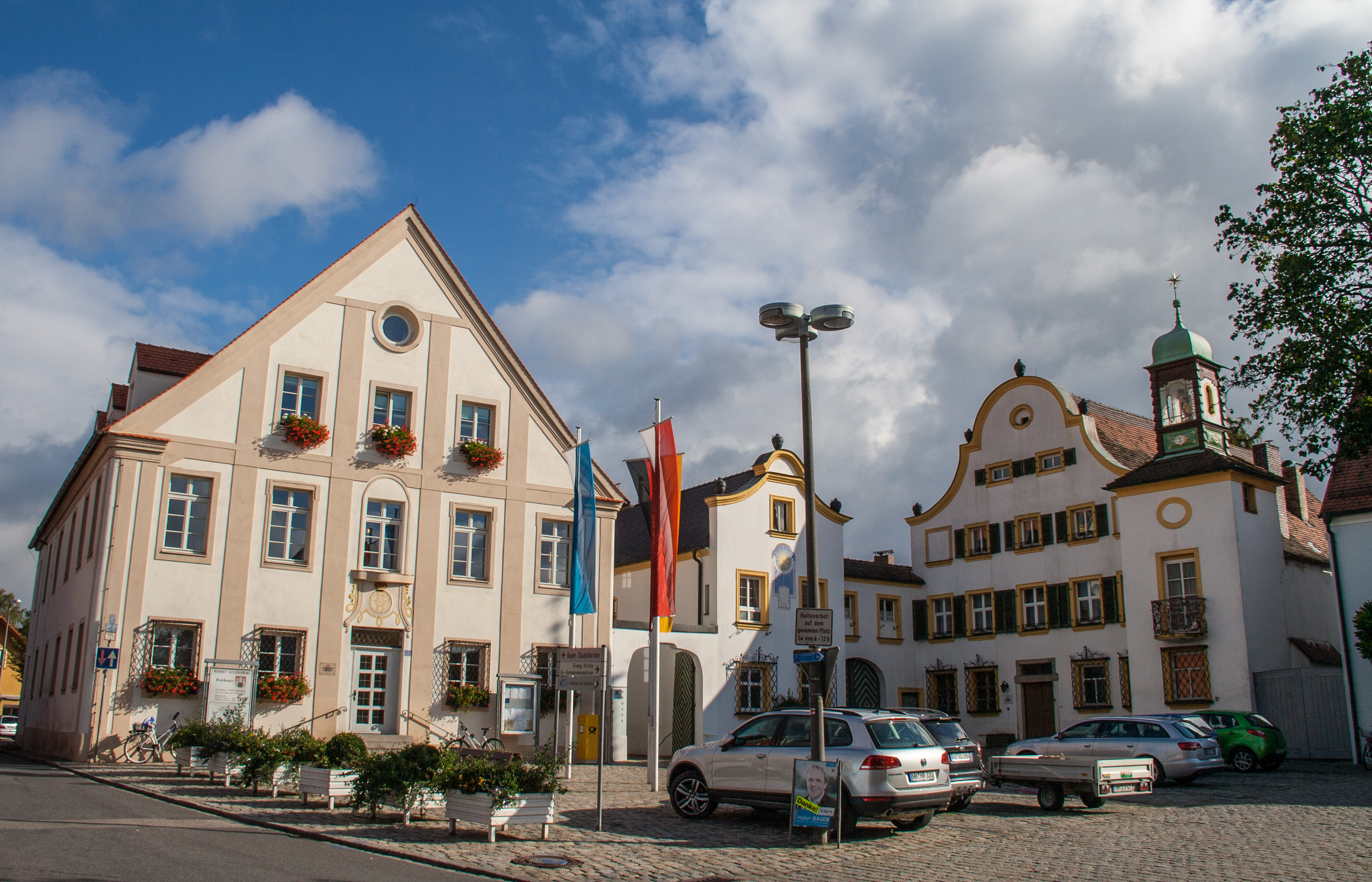
- Town Hall of Allersberg

- Coat of arms

- Location of Allersberg within Roth district
- Interactive map of Allersberg
- Location within Germany Location within Bavaria
- Coordinates: 49°15′N 11°14′E
- Country: Germany
- State: Bavaria
- Admin. region: Mittelfranken
- District: Roth

Government
  - Mayor (2023–29): Daniel Horndasch

Area
  - Total: 59.7 km^{2} (23.1 sq mi)
- Elevation: 385 m (1,263 ft)

Population (2025-12-31)
  - Total: 8,498
  - Density: 142/km^{2} (369/sq mi)
- Time zone: UTC+01:00 (CET)
  - Summer (DST): UTC+02:00 (CEST)
- Postal codes: 90584
- Dialling codes: 09176
- Vehicle registration: RH
- Website: www.allersberg.de

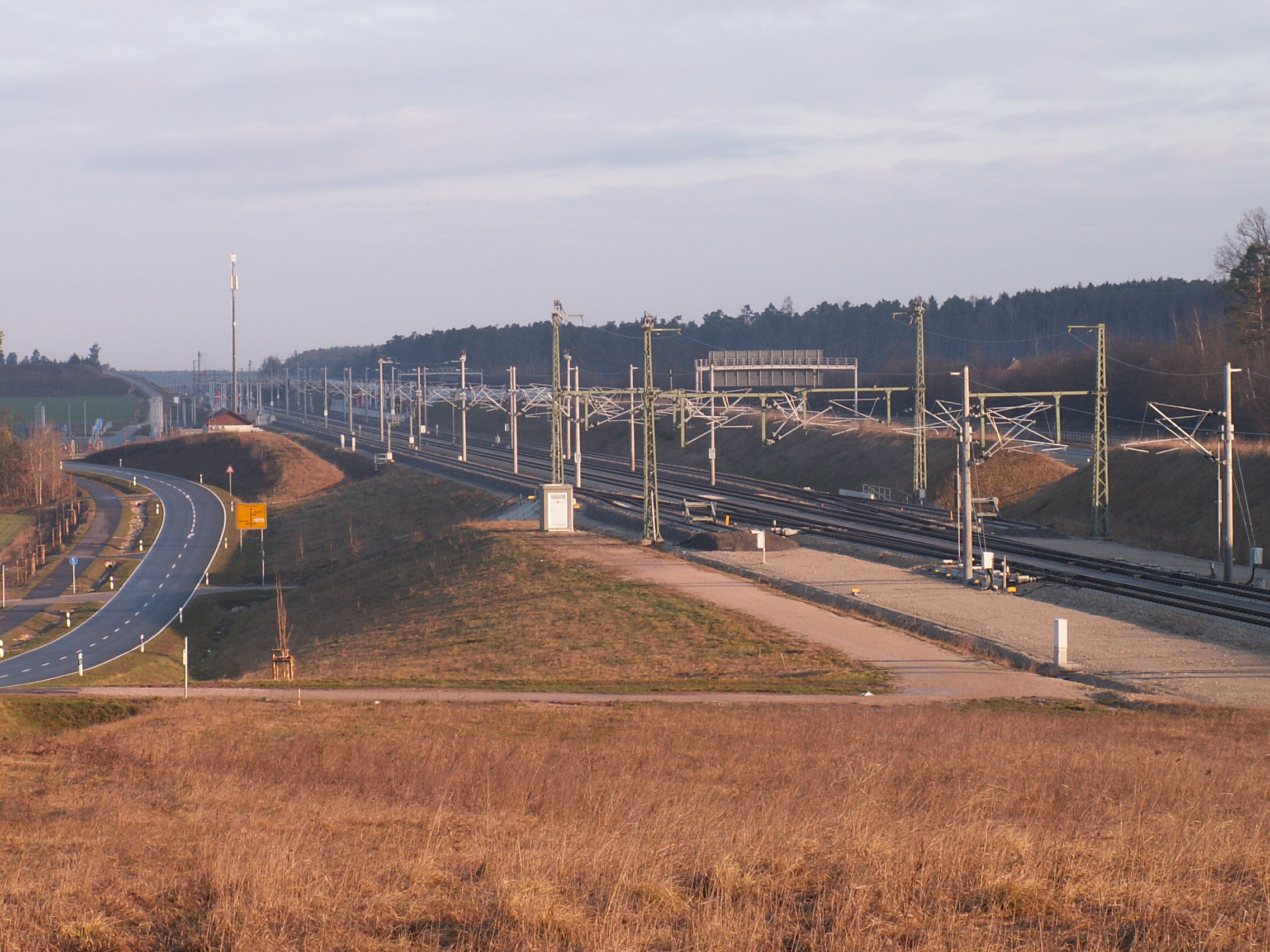
Allersberg train station

Allersberg (German pronunciation: [ˈalɐsbɛʁk]) is a municipality in the district of Roth, in Bavaria, Germany.

== History ==
=== Until the 19th century ===
Allersberg was first documented in 1254 as "Alrsperch" (Alrsberg's parish center). It is based on the Bavarian personal name Alaher.

In 1323, the brothers Lupold and Albrecht von Wolfstein received from Ludwig the Bavarian the right to fortify the village of Allersberg with a moat and walls, as well as the right to hold a market. which was further expanded in 1354 by Emperor Charles IV. Until 1475, the Wolfstein family resided in Allersberg, and they also founded the first hospital there in 1339. After that, the Bishopric of Eichstätt enfeoffed Duke Ludwig the Rich with Allersberg, thus forming Bavaria-Landshut.

Before 1800, Allersberg was a bailiwick and belonged to the Duchy of Neuburg-Sulzbach of the Wittelsbach dynasty, which had become part of the Bavaria in 1777. Allersberg possessed market rights with its own magistrate's rights. From 1689 to 2006, the town was the headquarters of the Jacob Gilardi company, the oldest manufacturer of Leonese goods in Germany.

Towards the end of the 18th century, there were 255 properties in Allersberg, including a hospital, a district judge's building, a toll house, a forestry office, and an administrative office, a sexton's house, a schoolhouse, and two gate towers. The High Court, as well as the village and community authority, was exercised by the Palatinate-Neuburg District Judge's Office of Allersberg.

Within the framework of the municipal edict (early 19th century), the tax district of Allersberg was formed, to which Dockenmühle, Eulenhof, Eisbühl, Eppersdorf, Harrhof, Hünerhof, Reckenricht, Reckenstetten, and Sankt Wolfgang belonged. With the Second Municipal Edict (1818), the rural municipality of Allersberg was created, to which Dockenmühle and Sankt Wolfgang belonged. The municipality originally had a territory of 8,176 km². Its administration and jurisdiction were assigned to the Regional Court of Hilpoltstein, and its financial administration to the Rentamt Hilpoltstein (renamed Finanzamt Hilpoltstein in 1919). From 1862, Allersberg belonged to the District Office of Neumarkt in der Oberpfalz. Jurisdiction remained with the Regional Court of Hilpoltstein (renamed Amtsgericht Hilpoltstein in 1879); since 1973, the Amtsgericht Schwabach has been responsible. In 1880, Allersberg was assigned to the newly formed District Office of Hilpoltstein (renamed District of Hilpoltstein in 1939).

=== 20th century ===
Towards the end of the World War II, Allersberg was severely destroyed in April 1945 in fighting against the advancing Seventh United States Army. At a time when the German resistance had already largely collapsed, the battle for Allersberg was particularly fierce and lasted for three days (from April 20 to 22, 1945).

As part of the territorial reform in Bavaria, the districts of Schwabach and Hilpoltstein were dissolved on July 1, 1972 and Allersberg became part of the newly formed district of Roth.
