= Archduchess Helena of Austria =

Archduchess Helena
- Hereditary Duchess of Württemberg
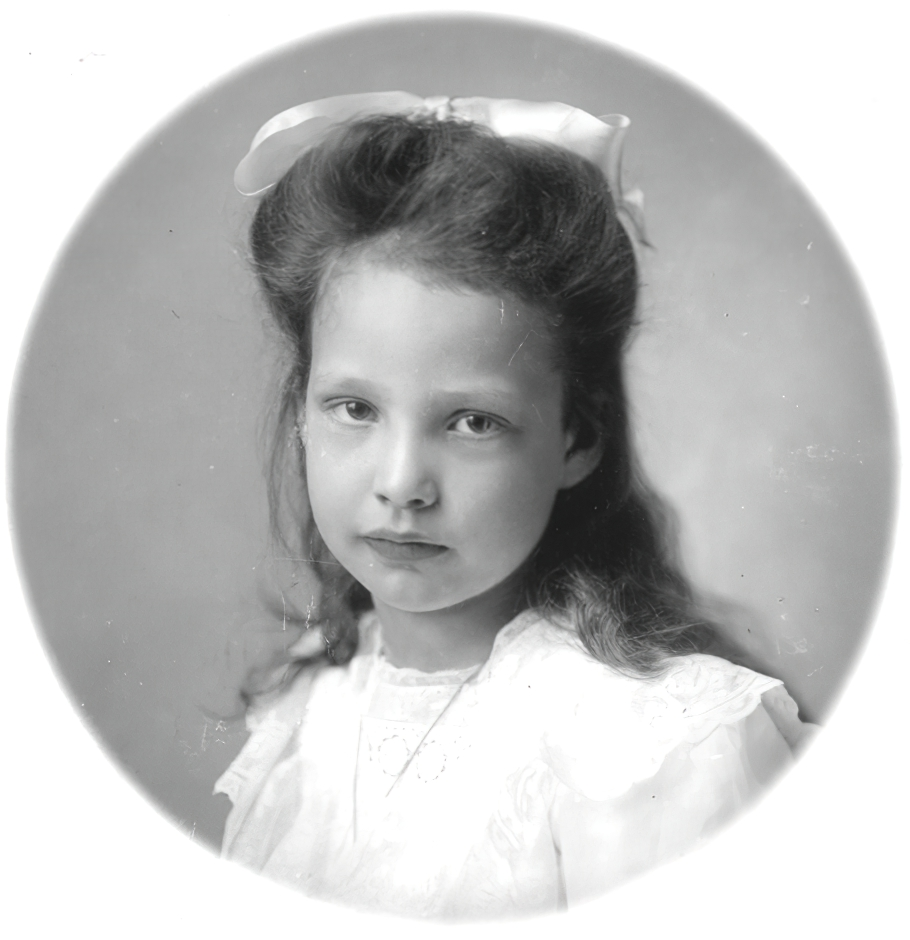
- Born: 30 October 1903; Linz, Austria-Hungary
- Died: 8 September 1924 (aged 20); Tübingen, Baden-Württemberg, Weimar Republic
- Spouse: Philipp Albrecht, Hereditary Duke of Württemberg (m. 1923)
- Issue: Duchess Marie Christine of Württemberg
Names
- German: Helena Marie Alice Christine Josefa Anna Margareta Madeleine Walburga Blandina Cäcilie Philomena Carmela Ignatia Rita de Cascia
- House: Habsburg-Lorraine
- Father: Archduke Peter Ferdinand, Prince of Tuscany
- Mother: Princess Maria Cristina of Bourbon-Two Sicilies
- Religion: Roman Catholicism

Archduchess Helena of Austria (full German name: Helena Marie Alice Christine Josefa Anna Margareta Madeleine Walburga Blandina Cäcilie Philomena Carmela Ignatia Rita de Cascia, Erzherzogin von Österreich, Prinzessin von Toskana; 30 October 1903 – 8 September 1924) was a member of the Tuscan branch of the House of Habsburg-Lorraine and an Archduchess of Austria and Princess of Bohemia, Hungary, and Tuscany by birth. Through her marriage to Philipp Albrecht, Hereditary Duke of Württemberg, Helena became a member of the House of Württemberg and Hereditary Duchess consort of Württemberg.

== Early life ==
Helena was born in Linz, Austria-Hungary, the second-eldest child and eldest daughter of Archduke Peter Ferdinand, Prince of Tuscany and his wife Princess Maria Cristina of Bourbon-Two Sicilies. Helena was raised with her three siblings in Salzburg and Vienna until the end of World War I in 1918 when her family was exiled and moved to Lucerne, Switzerland.

== Marriage and issue ==
Helena married Philipp Albrecht, Hereditary Duke of Württemberg, eldest child and son of Albrecht, Duke of Württemberg and his wife, Archduchess Margarete Sophie of Austria, on 24 October 1923 in Altshausen. Helena and Philipp Albrecht had one daughter:

- Duchess Maria Christina of Württemberg (born 2 September 1924 in Tübingen), married on 23 September 1948 to Prince Georg Hartmann of Liechtenstein (11 November 1911 – 18 January 1998), son of Prince Aloys of Liechtenstein.

== Death ==
Helena died just a week after giving birth to her daughter Maria Christina, aged only 20. Her husband later married her sister Archduchess Rosa of Austria, Princess of Tuscany in 1928.

== Ancestry ==
Ancestors of Archduchess Helena of Austria

8. Leopold II, Grand Duke of Tuscany
4. Ferdinand IV, Grand Duke of Tuscany
9. Princess Maria Antonia of the Two Sicilies
2. Archduke Peter Ferdinand of Austria
10. Charles III, Duke of Parma
5. Princess Alice of Bourbon-Parma
11. Princess Louise d'Artois
1. Archduchess Helena of Austria
12. Ferdinand II of the Two Sicilies
6. Prince Alfonso, Count of Caserta
13. Archduchess Maria Theresa of Austria
3. Princess Maria Cristina of Bourbon-Two Sicilies
14. Prince Francis, Count of Trapani
7. Princess Maria Antonietta of Bourbon-Two Sicilies
15. Archduchess Maria Isabella of Austria

== Bibliography ==
- Commire, Anne (2001). Women in World History: A Biographical Encyclopedia. Gale Research. ISBN 978-0787640729.
- McNaughton, Arnold (1973). The Book of Kings: A Royal Genealogy. Quadrangle/New York Times Book Company. ISBN 0812902807.
- Montgomery-Massingberd, Hugh (1997). Burke's Royal Families of the World: Europe & Latin America. Burke's Peerage. ISBN 0850110238.
- Almanach de Gotha. Gotha, Germany: Justus Perthes. 1923.
- Habsburg-Tuscany, G. (1930). Archduke Peter Ferdinand: A Life in Exile. Private Press.
- Genealogisches Handbuch des Adels (in German). Vol. Fürstliche Häuser I. C.A. Starke Verlag. 1951.
