= Waldburg-Wolfegg =

Holy Roman Empire state

Coordinates: 47°46′N 9°43′E

County of Waldburg-Wolfegg Grafschaft Waldburg-Wolfegg
- 1589–1798
- Coat of arms
- Status: State of the Holy Roman Empire
- Capital: Waldburg
- Common languages: Alemannic German
- Government: Principality
- Reichsgraf
  - 1667–81 (first): Maximilian Franz Eusebius
  - 1791–98 (last): Karl Eberhard Wunibald
- Historical era: Middle Ages
  - Partitioned from Waldburg-Wolfegg-Zeil: 1589
  - Partitioned to create Waldburg-Waldsee: 1667
  - Annexed by W-Waldsee: 1798
| Preceded by | Succeeded by |
| Waldburg-Wolfegg-Zeil | Waldburg-Waldsee |

Waldburg-Wolfegg was a County ruled by the House of Waldburg, located in southeastern Baden-Württemberg, Germany. Waldburg-Wolfegg was a partition of Waldburg-Wolfegg-Zeil and was repartitioned in 1667, creating Waldburg-Waldsee, which annexed Waldburg-Wolfegg in 1798 and became the principality of Waldburg-Wolfegg and Waldsee.

== Counts of Waldburg-Wolfegg ==
- Maximilian Franz Eusebius, 1667–81
- Ferdinand Louis, 1681–1735
- Joseph Franz, 1735–74
- Ferdinand, 1774–79
- Josef Alois, 1779–91
- Karl Eberhard Wunibald, 1791–98

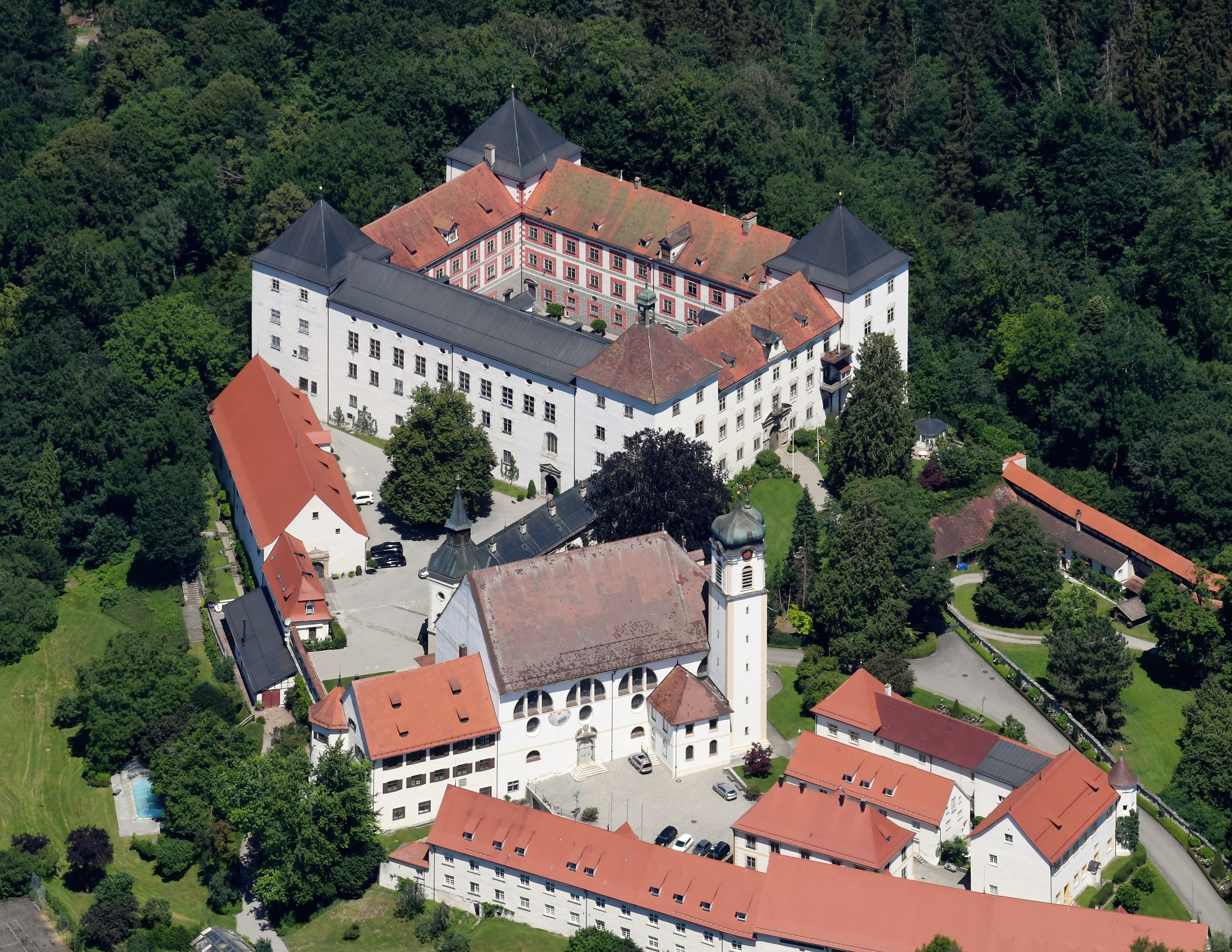
Wolfegg Castle
