= Hans Fugger =

German arts patron, businessman and politician of the Fugger family (1531–1598)

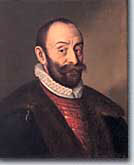
Hans Fugger

Hans Fugger von der Lilie, full name Hans, Freiherr Fugger, Herr zu Kirchheim, Glött, Mickhausen, Stettenfels und Schmiechen, (4 September 1531 – 19 April 1598; buried in Kirchheim in Schwaben) was a German arts patron, businessman and politician of the Fugger family.

== Life ==
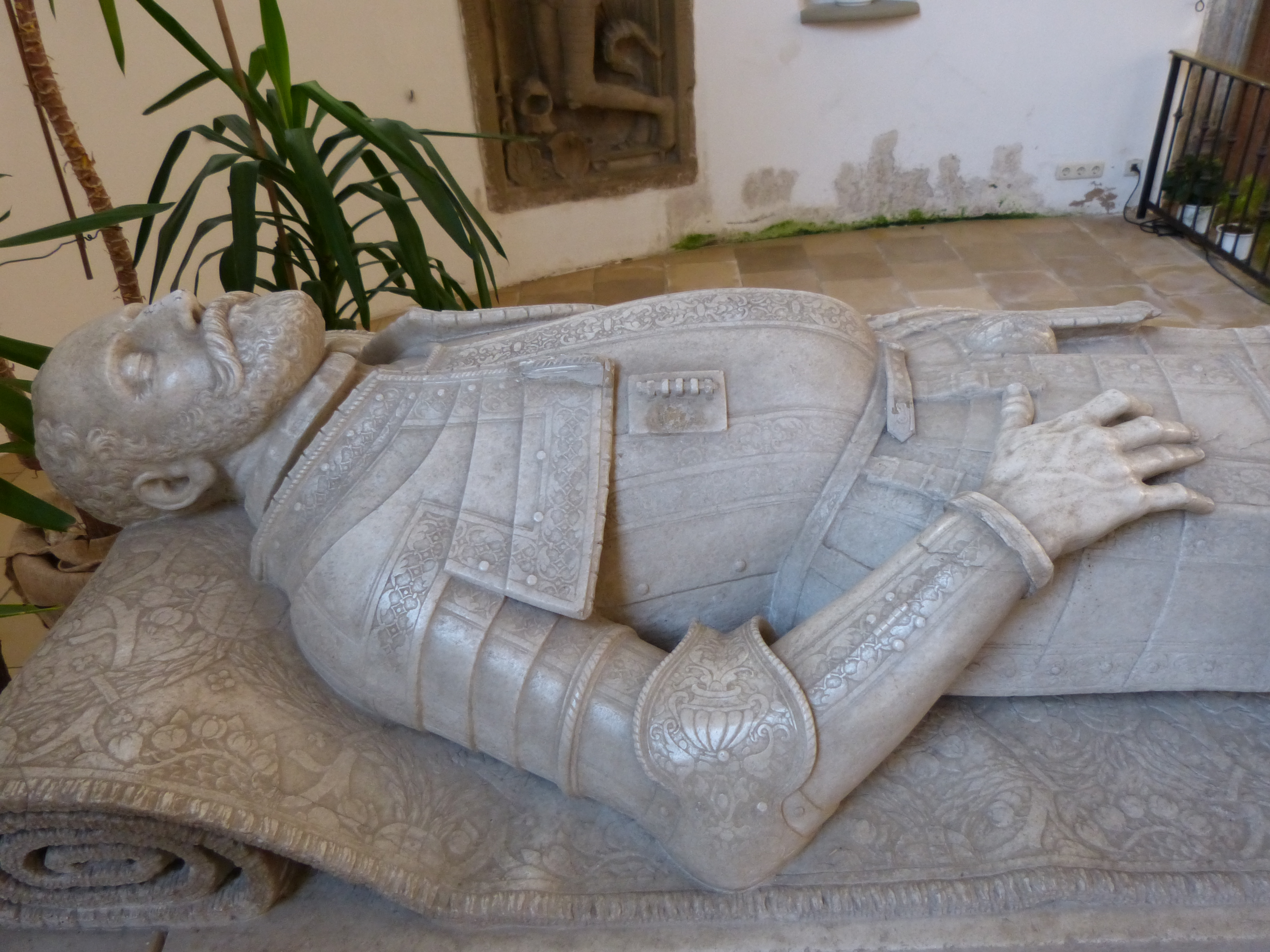
Epitaph of Hans Fugger, St. Peter and Paul, Kirchheim in Swabia

He was the second son of Anton Fugger (1493–1560) and Anna Rehlinger. As befitted the family's new standing, he and his brothers Marx (1529–1597), Hieronimus (1533–1573) and Jakob (1542–1598) received a cultural and philosophical education as well as a mercantile one. Throughout his life Hans served the family's commercial interests in different areas, ranging from the Netherlands to Spain to his native Augsburg.

After his father Anton's death in 1560 he and his brothers managed the now-substantial family estates and business together. In 1573 the brothers divided the business up between them, with Hans getting (among others) the lands in Kirchheim, Glött, Burg Stettenfels and Duttenstein. In 1583 Hans and his brothers had their lands made Imperial States in the Schwäbischen Reichsgrafenkollegium and raised to Kreisstand status in the Swabian Imperial Circle. On his brother Marx's death in 1597, Hans was elected head of the whole Fugger business.

Hans was a great patron of the arts, partly to impress his business clients, showing off his collections in his Burg Stettenfels, the Fuggerschloss Kirchheim and what are now known as the Badstuben in the Fuggerhäuser in Augsburg. His correspondence is also to be found in cartularies now in the Fuggerarchiv in Dillingen an der Donau - precises of these have recently been made available.

== Bibliography ==
- Bayerische Staatsbibliothek München: Die Fugger im Bild . Selbstdarstellung einer Familiendynastie der Renaissance, Ausstellungskatalog; Quaternio Verlag Luzern 2010 ISBN 978-3-88008-003-4
- Johannes Burkhardt: Das Ehrenbuch der Fugger, Faksimile, Transkription und Kommentar, 2 Bände, Wißner Verlag, Augsburg 2004 ISBN 3-89639-445-2
- Christl Karnehm: Die Korrespondenz Hans Fuggers von 1566–1594. Regesten der Kopierbücher aus dem Fuggerarchiv. München 2003, ISBN 3-7696-9706-5
- Franz Karg: Schloss Kirchheim Kunstführer. 2. Auflage. Kunstverlag Josef Fink, Lindenberg 2001, ISBN 3-931820-76-9
- Georg Lill: Hans Fugger (1531–1598) und die Kunst. Ein Beitrag zur Spätrenaissance in Süddeutschland. Duncker & Humblot, Leipzig 1908 (Digitalisat als PDF)
- Johannes Burkhardt/Franz Karg (Hg): Die Welt des Hans Fugger (1531–1598) Materialien zur Geschichte der Fugger Bd. 1. Wissner, Augsburg 2007, ISBN 978-3-89639-557-3
- Mark Häberlein: Die Fugger. Geschichte einer Augsburger Familie (1367–1650). Kohlhammer Verlag, Stuttgart 2006, ISBN 978-3-17-018472-5
