= Ulrich Fugger the Elder =

German businessman (1441–1510)

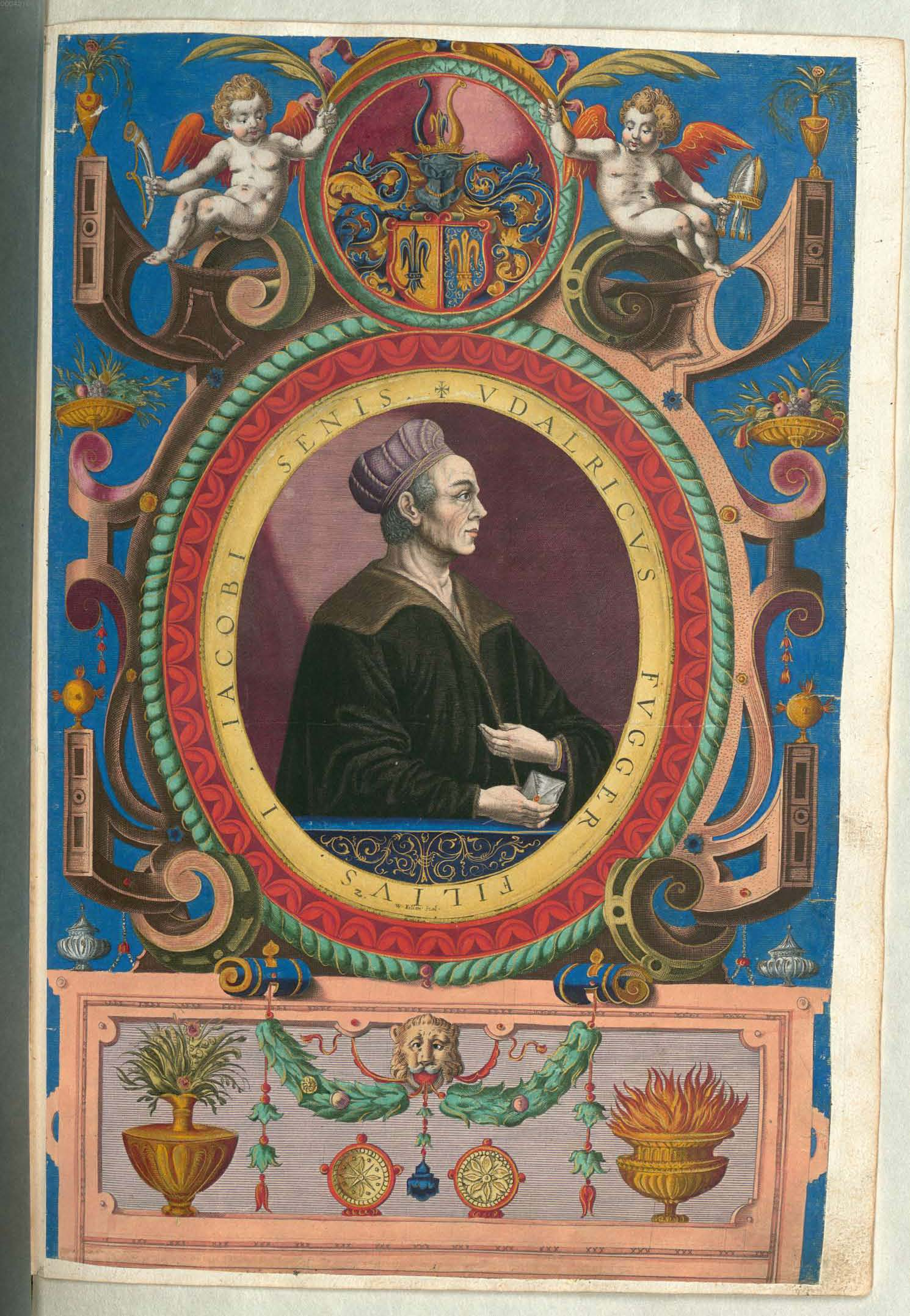
Ulrich Fugger the Elder – a coloured copper-plate from Fuggerorum et Fuggerarum imagines, 1618.

Ulrich Fugger von der Lilie (1441–1510) was a German businessman of the Fugger family. He formally headed the family firm from his father's death in 1469 until his own death in 1510 after an operation to remove a bladder stone, though his business skills never matched those of his younger brother Jakob Fugger.

== Family ==
Fugger was born and died in Augsburg. The eldest son of Jakob Fugger the Elder and his wife Barbara Bäsinger, he was a brother and business partner to Jakob Fugger the Younger and Georg Fugger. His other brothers included Georg Andreas (not to be confused with Andreas Fugger vom Reh), Johann (known as Hans, not to be confused with Ulrich's great-nephew Hans Fugger) and Peter.

In 1479 he married Veronika Lauginger, with whom he had:

- Anna (born 1484)
- Ursula (born 1485)
- Ulrich II (born 1490)
- Sybille (born 1493)
- Hieronymus (born 1499)

== Bibliography ==
- (in German) Bayerische Staatsbibliothek München: Die Fugger im Bild. Selbstdarstellung einer Familiendynastie in der Renaissance, Ausstellungskatalog, Quaternio Verlag, Luzern 2010 ISBN 978-3-88008-003-4
- (in German) Johannes Burkhardt: Das Ehrenbuch der Fugger, Faksimile, Transkription und Kommentar, 2 Bände, Wißner Verlag, Augsburg 2004 ISBN 978-3-89639-445-3
- (in German) Martin Kluger: Die Fugger. Die deutschen Medici in und um Augsburg, Context Verlag, Augsburg 2009 ISBN 978-3-939645-13-9
