= Fugger family =

Historical Augsburg-based family of European bankers

County of Kirchberg and Weissenhorn Grafschaft Kirchberg und Weißenhorn
- 1507–1806
- Coat of arms

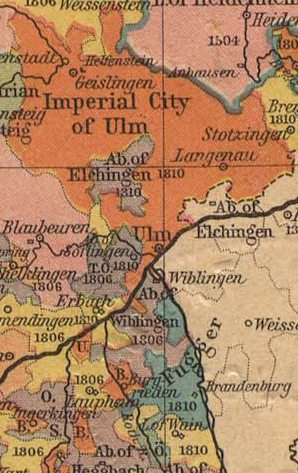
- Map of Württemberg before the French Revolutionary Wars, showing the County of Fugger, with the Danube shown running through the centre of the image and the Iller forming the border between Württemberger lands (coloured) and Bavarian lands (non-coloured)
- Status: County
- Capital: Weißenhorn (nominally); Imp. City Augsburg (de facto)
- Government: Principality
- Historical era: Early modern Europe
  - Pledged non-immediate County of Kirchberg and Lordship of Weißenhorn: 1507
  - Raised to Imperial nobility: 1511
  - Gained immediate Lordship of Glött: 1536
  - Fugger lands' immediacy: 1541
  - Joined Swabian Circle: 1563
  - Mediatised to Bavaria and Württemberg: 1806
Preceded by
Duchy of Bavaria	Duchy of Bavaria
Duchy of Württemberg	Duchy of Württemberg
Imperial City of Augsburg	Augsburg
Succeeded by
Kingdom of Bavaria
Kingdom of Württemberg

The House of Fugger (German pronunciation: [ˈfʊɡɐ]) is a German family that was historically a prominent group of European bankers, members of the fifteenth- and sixteenth-century mercantile patriciate of Augsburg, international mercantile bankers, and venture capitalists. Alongside the Welser family, the Fugger family controlled much of the European economy in the sixteenth century and accumulated enormous wealth. The Fuggers held a near monopoly on the European copper market.

This banking family replaced the Medici family who influenced all of Europe during the Renaissance. The Fuggers took over many of the Medicis' assets and their political power and influence. They were closely affiliated with the House of Habsburg whose rise to world power they financed. Unlike the citizenry of their hometown and most other trading patricians of German free imperial cities, such as the Tuchers, they never converted to Lutheranism, as presented in the Augsburg Confession, but rather remained with the Roman Catholic Church and thus close to the Habsburg emperors.

Jakob Fugger "the Rich" was elevated to the nobility of the Holy Roman Empire in May 1511 and assumed the title Imperial Count of Kirchberg and Weissenhorn in 1514. Today, he is considered to be one of the wealthiest people ever to have lived, with a GDP-adjusted net worth of over $400 billion, approximately 2% of the entire GDP of Europe at the time. While the company was dissolved in 1657, the Fuggers remained wealthy landowners and ruled the County of Kirchberg and Weissenhorn. The Babenhausen branch became Princes of the Holy Roman Empire in 1803, while the Glött branch of the family became Princes in Bavaria in 1914.

== History ==
=== Founding ===
The founder of the family was Hans Fugger, a weaver at Graben, near the Swabian Free City of Augsburg. The last name was originally spelled "Fucker" – the first recorded reference to the family comes when Johann's son, also named Johann (or Hans), moved to Augsburg in 1367, with the local tax register laconically noting Fucker advenit, "Fugger has arrived". He married Klara Widolf and became an Augsburg citizen. After Klara's death, he married Elizabeth Gattermann. He joined the weaver's guild, and by 1396, he was ranked high in the list of taxpayers. He added the business of a merchant to that of a weaver.

His eldest son, Andreas Fugger, was a merchant in the weaving trade, and was nicknamed "Fugger the Rich" after buying land and other properties. The Fugger family itemized and inventoried a large number of Asian rugs, an unusual undertaking at the time. Andreas's son, Lukas Fugger, was granted arms by the Emperor Frederick III, a golden deer on a blue background, and he was soon nicknamed "the Fugger of the Deer". He would eventually go bankrupt. His descendants served their cousins of the famous younger branch and later went to Silesia. Contemporary members of the Fugger of the Deer (German: Fugger vom Reh) are descendants of Matthäus Fugger (1442–1489/92).

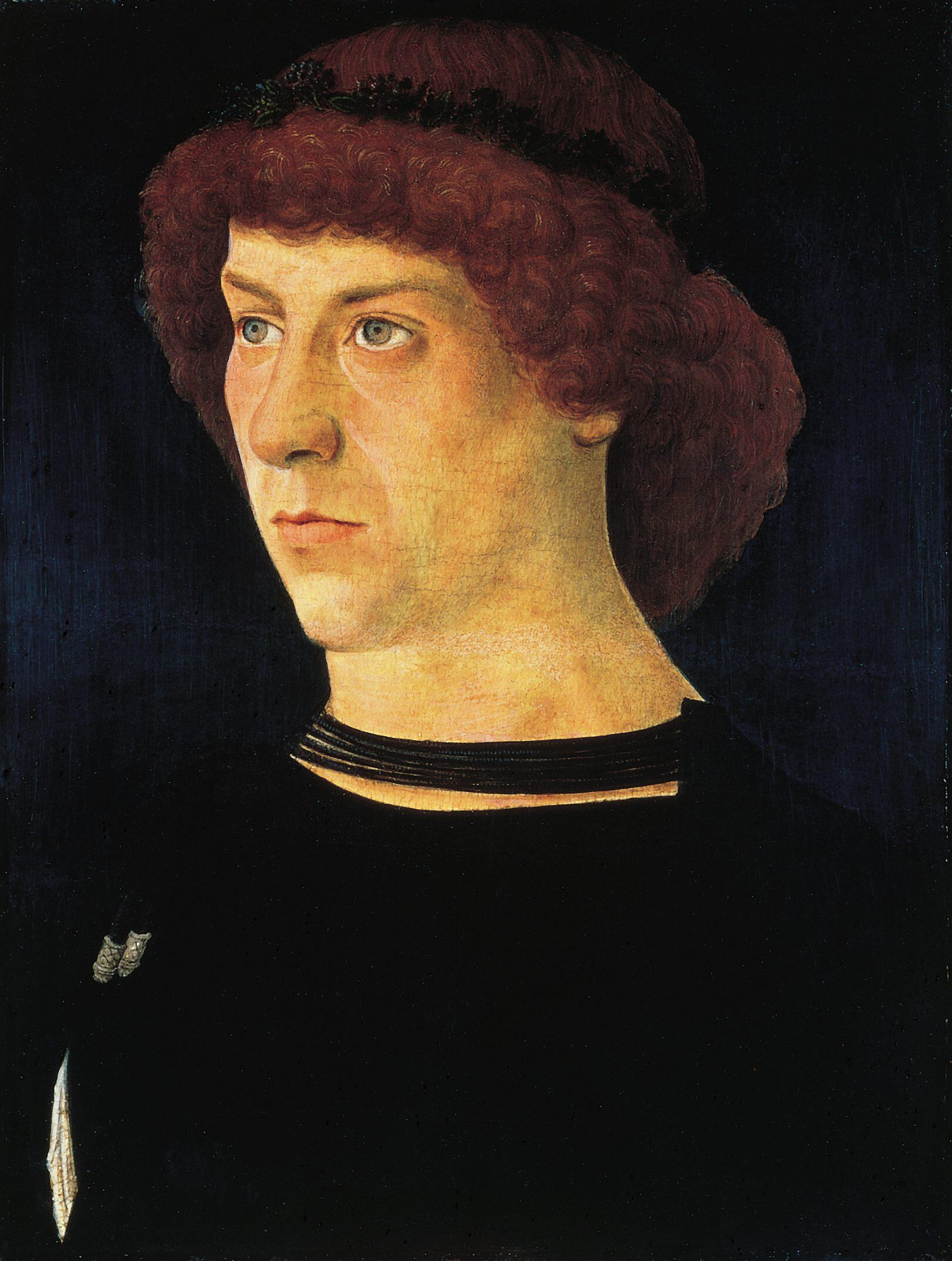
Portrait of Georg Fugger by Giovanni Bellini, 1474

Hans Fugger's younger son, Jakob the Elder, founded another branch of the family. This branch progressed more steadily and they became known as the "Fuggers of the Lily" after their chosen arms of a flowering lily on a gold and blue background. Jakob was a master weaver, a merchant, and an alderman. He married Barbara Bäsinger, the daughter of a goldsmith. His fortune progressed, and by 1461, he was the twelfth richest man in Augsburg. He died in 1469.

Jakob's eldest son, Ulrich, took over the business on his father's death, and in 1473 he provided new suits of clothes to Frederick, his son Maximilian I, and his suite on their journey to Trier to meet Charles the Bold of Burgundy and the betrothal of the young prince to Charles's daughter Maria. Thus began a very profitable relationship between the Fugger family and the Habsburgs.

With the help of their brother in Rome, Marx, Ulrich and his brother George handled remittances to the papal court of monies for the sale of indulgences and the procuring of Church benefices. From 1508 to 1515, they leased the Roman mint. Ulrich died in 1510.

When the Fuggers made their first loan to the Archduke Sigismund in 1487, they took as security an interest in silver and copper mines in the Tyrol. This was the beginning of an extensive family involvement in mining and precious metals. The Fuggers also participated in mining operations in Silesia, and owned copper mines in Hungary. Their trade in spices, wool, and silk extended to almost all parts of Europe.

=== Jakob Fugger "the Rich" ===
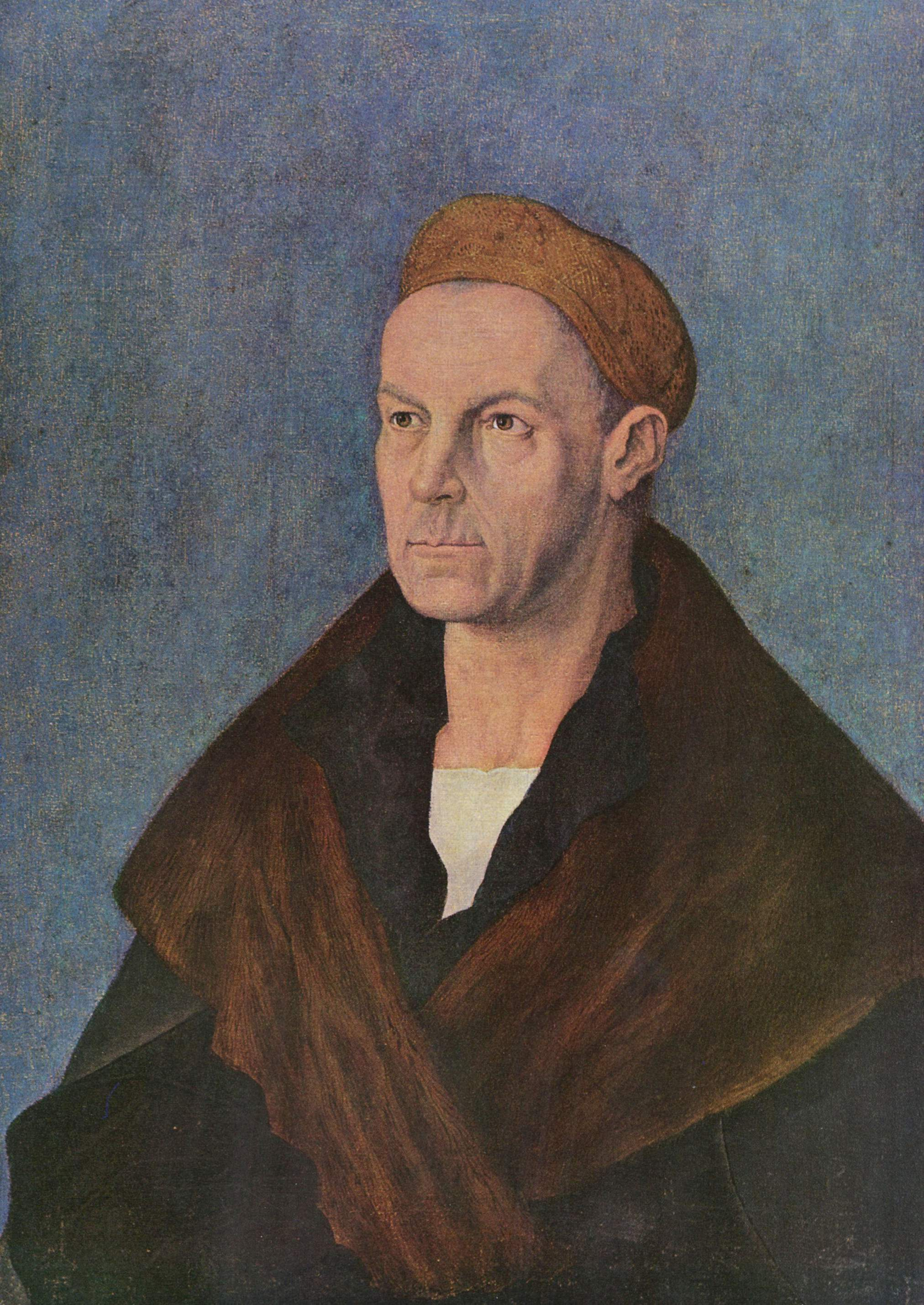
Jakob Fugger, "the Rich" (1459–1525), by Albrecht Dürer

Ulrich's youngest brother Jakob Fugger, born in 1459, was to become the most famous member of the dynasty. In 1498, he married Sibylla Artzt, Grand Burgheress to Augsburg, the daughter of an eminent Grand Burgher of Augsburg (German: Großbürger zu Augsburg). They had no children, but this marriage gave Jakob the opportunity to elevate to Grand Burgher of Augsburg and later allowed him to pursue a seat on the city council (Stadtrat) of Augsburg. He was elevated to the nobility of the Holy Roman Empire in May 1511, made Imperial Count in 1514, and in 1519, led a consortium of German and Italian businessmen that loaned Charles V 850,000 florins (about 95,625 oz(t) or 2974 kg of gold) to procure his election as Holy Roman Emperor over Francis I of France. The Fuggers' contribution was 543,000 florins.

In 1494, the Fuggers established their first public company. Jakob's aim was to establish a copper monopoly by opening foundries in Hohenkirchen and Fuggerau (named for the family, in Carinthia) and by expanding the sales organization in Europe, especially the Antwerp agency. Jakob leased the copper mines in Besztercebánya in the Kingdom of Hungary (today Banská Bystrica, Slovakia) in 1495, eventually making them the greatest mining centre of the time.

At the height of his power Jakob Fugger was sharply criticized by his contemporaries, especially by Ulrich von Hutten and Martin Luther, for selling indulgences and benefices and urging the Pope to rescind or amend the prohibition on the levying of interest. The imperial fiscal and governmental authorities in Nuremberg brought action against him and other merchants in an attempt to halt their monopolistic practices.

In 1511, Jakob deposited 15,000 florins as an endowment for some almshouses. In 1514, he bought up part of Augsburg and in 1516 came to an agreement with the city that he would build and provide a number of almshouses for needy citizens. By 1523, 52 houses had been built, and the Fuggerei had come into existence. It is still used today.

Jakob died in 1525. He is considered to be one of the richest persons of all time, and today he is well known as Jakob Fugger "the rich". At its peak his wealth is estimated to be 2% of Europe's GDP.

=== Later years ===
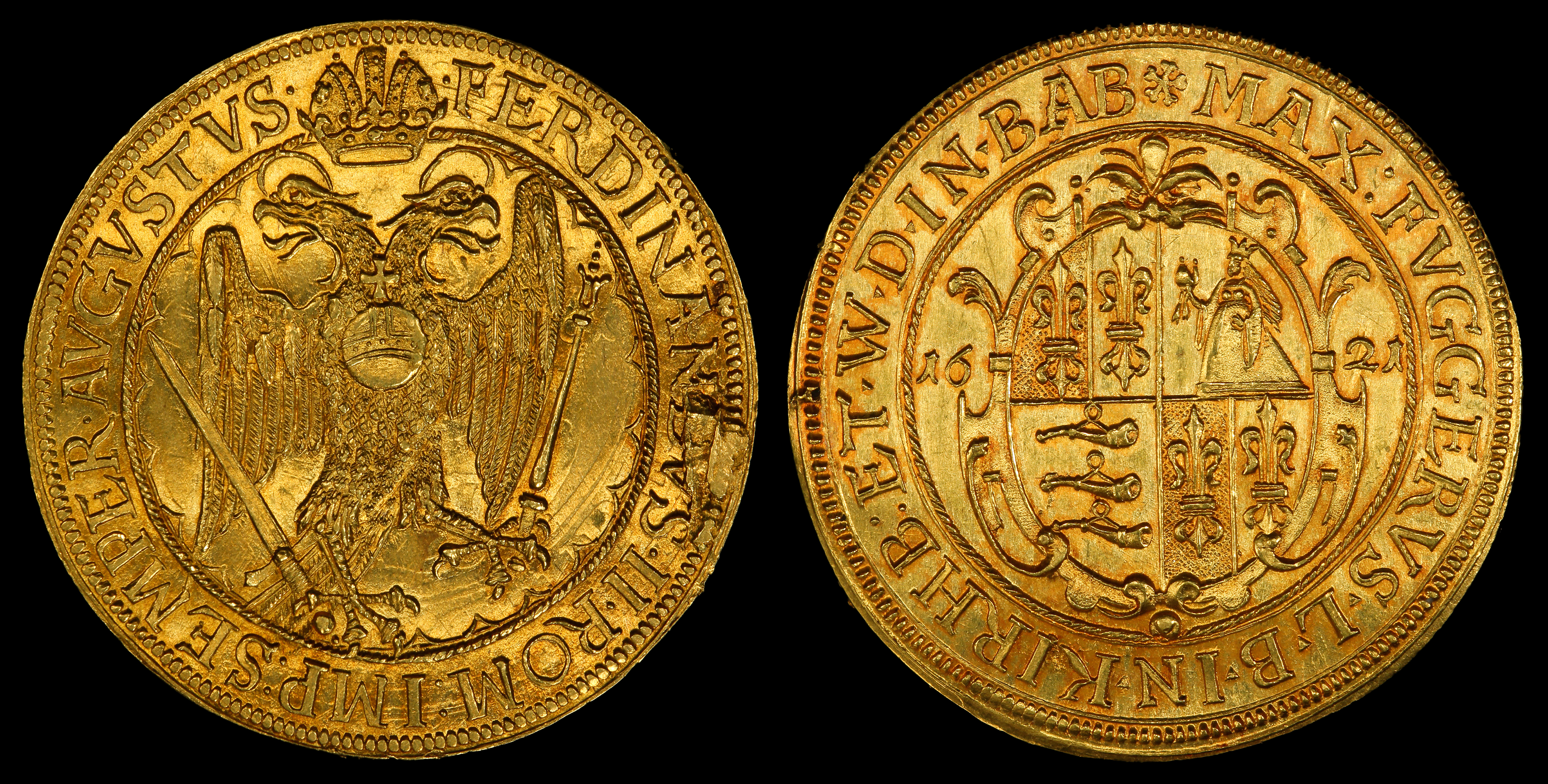
10 ducats (1621) minted as circulating currency by the Fugger family

Jakob's successor was his nephew Anton Fugger, son of his elder brother Georg. Anton was born in 1493, married Anna Rehlinger, and died in 1560.

In 1525, the Fuggers were granted the revenues from the Spanish orders of knighthood, together with the profits from mercury and silver mines. The formerly rich yield of the Tirolean and Hungarian mines decreased, but Anton established new trade ties with Peru and Chile, and he started mining ventures in Sweden and Norway. He was involved in the slave trade from Africa to America, but he was more successful in the spice trade and the importation of Hungarian cattle. Eventually, he was forced to renounce the Maestrazgo lease after 1542 and to give up the silver mines of Guadalcanal.

In 1530 and 1531, the Fuggers held exclusive rights to trade through the strait of Magellan. While European trade with Asia through this route was thought to be possible, the Fuggers never developed this route. Decades later, the Manila galleon would inaugurate trade with Asia across the Pacific with no Fugger involvement.

After hard times under Anton's nephew and successor Johann Jakob, Anton's eldest son Markus carried on the business successfully, earning some 50,000,000 ducats between 1563 and 1641 from the production of mercury at Almadén alone. However, the Fugger company was completely dissolved after the Thirty Years' War, when Leopold Fugger returned the mines in Tyrol to the Habsburgs in 1657.

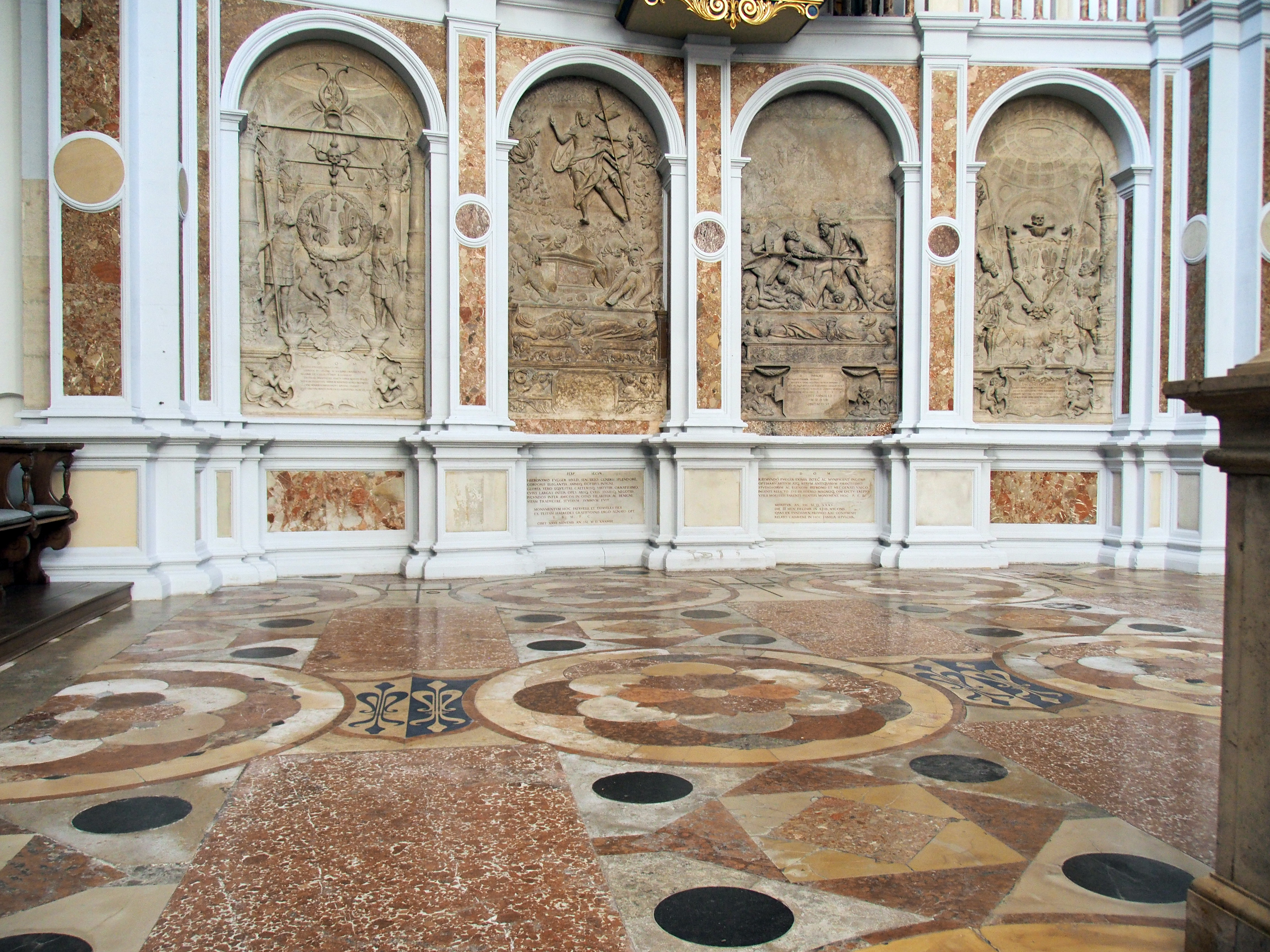
The Fugger family's burial chapel of 1509 at St. Anne's Church, Augsburg

The Fugger family's burial chapel of 1509 in St. Anne's Church in Augsburg is the earliest example of Renaissance architecture in Germany, with its memorial relief tablets in the style of Dürer in the choir of the church. It became the burial place of the three brothers – Jacob Fugger, Georg Fugger and Ulrich Fugger the Elder – and their two nephews, Raymund Fugger and Hieronymus Fugger (1499–1538). When St. Anne's Church became Protestant in 1548, the Fugger Chapel remained Catholic, because the Fugger foundation continued to look after it and contributed to the upkeep of the church. Hence, part of the church is denominationally different from the rest, and the burial place of the Fugger family, who are considered strictly Catholic, is now in a Protestant church. Adding to the oddity is the fact that Jacob Fugger's loans to Cardinal Albert of Brandenburg and the indulgence to repay them were what triggered Martin Luther's Reformation.

Anselm Maria Fugger von Babenhausen (1766–1821) was created Prince of the Holy Roman Empire in 1803. The current head of this branch is Prince Hubertus Fugger von Babenhausen, who owns Jakob the Rich's former business seat (the Fuggerhäuser in Augsburg), as well as nearby Wellenburg Castle and the castle at Babenhausen, Bavaria (purchased by Anton Fugger in 1539 and today housing a museum about the family history). He is also co-owner of a small private bank, the Fürst Fugger Privatbank, in Augsburg.

The Fugger von Glött branch, which descended from Johann Ernst (a great-grandson of Anton), was elevated in 1913 to the rank of a Bavarian prince in the person of Carl Ernst Fürst Fugger von Glött. This branch ended in the male line with his son Joseph-Ernst Fürst Fugger von Glött (1895–1981), husband of Princess Stephanie of Hohenzollern (1895–1975). His estate – including the castle at Kirchheim in Schwaben (acquired in 1551 by Anton Fugger) – was inherited by his sister Maria's (1894–1935) son, Albert Count von Arco-Zinneberg (b. 1932), whom he adopted, and who took the name of Fugger von Glött.

The Fugger von Kirchberg und zu Weissenhorn comital branch is today represented by Countess Maria-Elisabeth von Thun und Hohenstein (née countess Fugger), heiress of Kirchberg Castle at Illerkirchberg (bought in 1507 by Jakob Fugger). She also heads the charitable family foundations, including the Fuggerei in Augsburg and Welden monastery.

In Augsburg, a museum of Fugger and Welser history (Fugger und Welser Erlebnismuseum) was opened.

=== Findings ===
In April 2019, Dutch maritime investigators unearthed a 16th-century shipwreck during an exploration for container ship MSC Zoe which lost containers overboard in January 2019. Copper plates with emblem of the Fugger family were found in the ship built around 1540 in the Netherlands during the reign of Charles V.

== Family members ==
- Hans (I.) Fugger (born 1367 in Augsburg, died 1408)
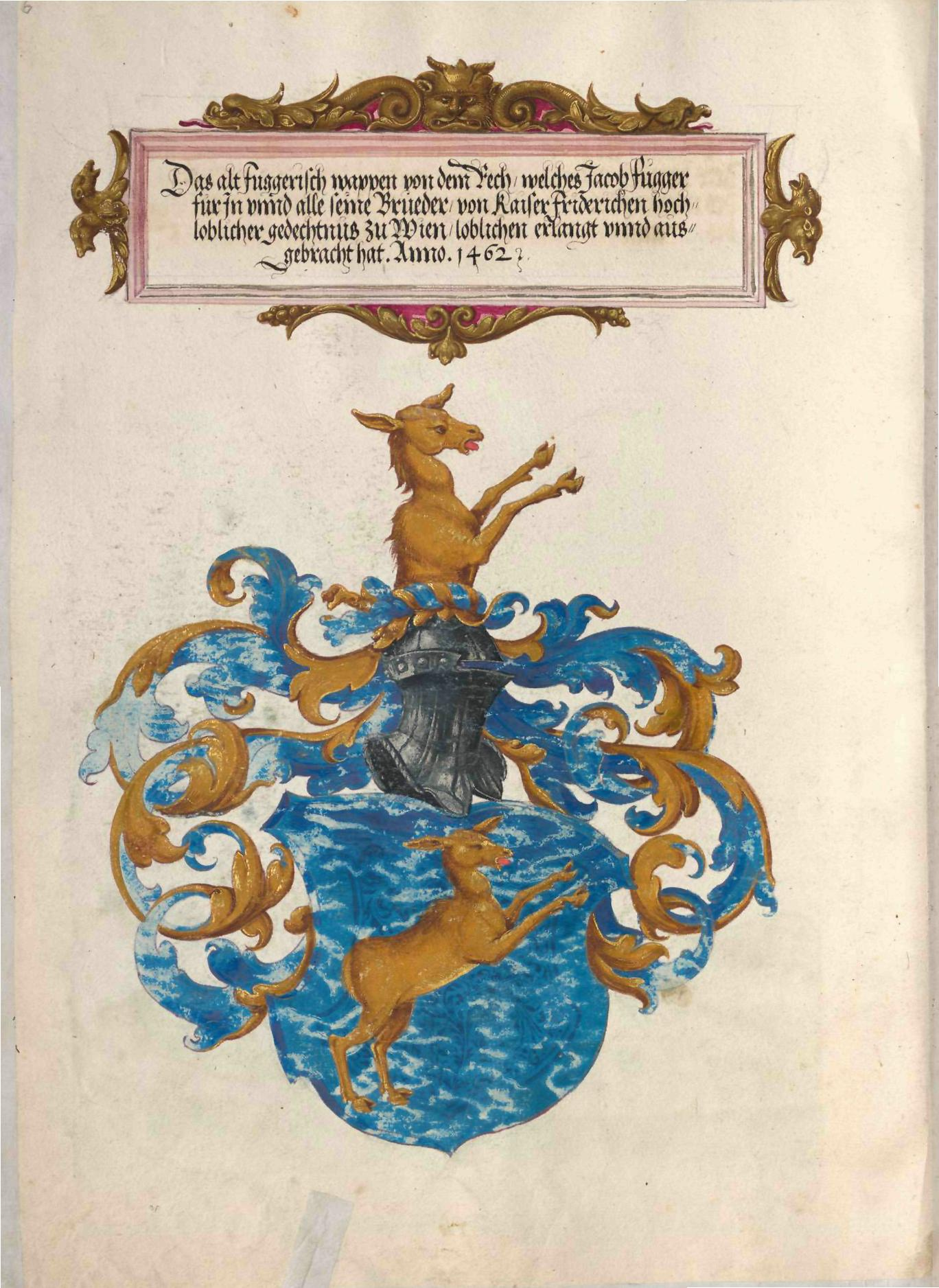
  - Coat of arms of the "Fugger of the Deer"
    Andreas Fugger (1394–1457), founder of the branch "Fugger of the Deer"
    - Jakob Fugger (b. 1430)
    - Lukas Fugger (b. 1439–ca. 1512)
    - Matthäus Fugger (b. 1442)
      - Sebastian Fugger (b. 1470/72)
        - Andreas Wilhelm Hieronimus Fugger (1507–1573)
          - Georg Wilhelm Sebastian Raymund Fugger (1547–ca. 1600)
      - Ulrich Fugger (1524–1586)
    - Hans Fugger (b. 1443)
      - Gastel Fugger (1475–1539), ennobled in 1529
        - Wolfgang Fugger (1519/20–1568)
          - Johann Christoph Fugger (1561–1612)
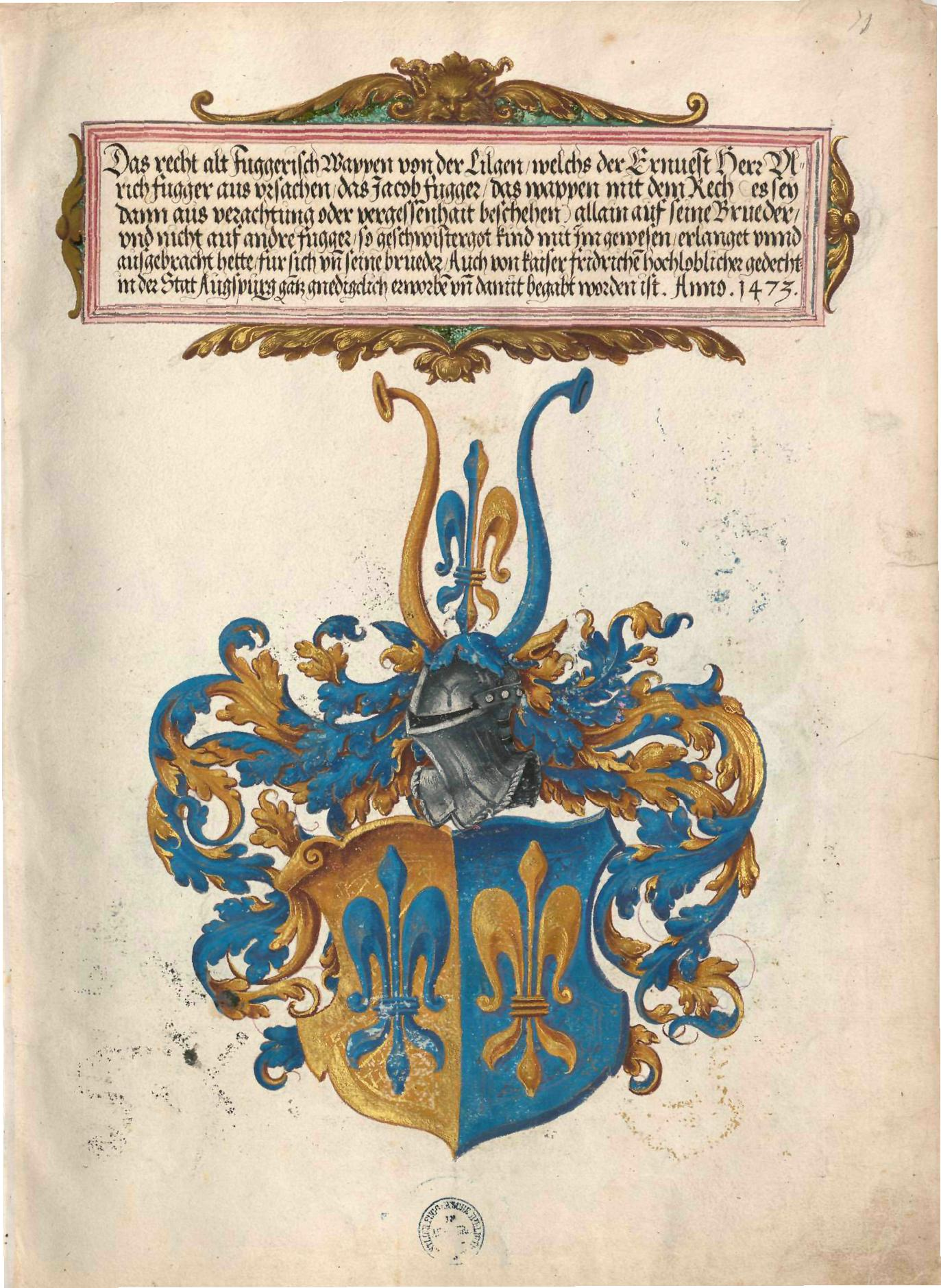
  - Coat of arms of the "Fugger of the Lily"
    Jakob Fugger the Elder (1398–1469), founder of the branch "Fugger of the Lily"
    - Ulrich Fugger the Elder (1441–1510), head of the Augsburg company
      - Ulrich Fugger the Younger (1490–1525)
    - Georg Fugger (1453–1506), head of the Nuremberg company
      - Raymund Fugger (1489–1535), cr. Imperial Count of Kirchberg, Weissenhorn and Marstetten in 1535
        - Johann Jakob Fugger (Hans II. Jakob) (1516–1575)
          - Sigmund Friedrich Fugger (1542–1600), bishop
        - Georg Fugger (1518–1569)
          - Philipp Eduard Fugger (1546–1618)
          - Octavian Secundus Fugger (1549–1600)
        - Ulrich (III.) Fugger (1526–1584)
      - Anton Fugger (1493–1560), cr. Imperial Count in 1530
        - Markus (III.) Fugger (1529–1597), founder of the company Marx Fugger and brothers
        - Hans (III.) Fugger of Kirchheim and Glött (1531–1598)
          - Markus (IV.) Fugger (1564–1614)
          - Jakob (IV.) Fugger (1567–1626)
          - Christoph Fugger (1566–1615)
            - Carl Ernst Fugger (1559–1640)
            - Otto Heinrich Fugger, Count of Kirchberg ("Ottheinrich") (1592–1644), general
        - Jakob (III.) Fugger (1542–1598), Lord of Babenhausen, Wellenburg and Boos
          - Johann Fugger the Elder (1583–1633)
            - [...]
              - Anselm Maria Fugger von Babenhausen (1766–1821), cr. Prince of the Holy Roman Empire in 1803
    - Jakob Fugger "the Rich" (1459–1525), head of international activities, cr. Baron in 1511, cr. Imperial Count in 1514

=== (Mediatized) Princes of Fugger-Babenhausen (1803) ===
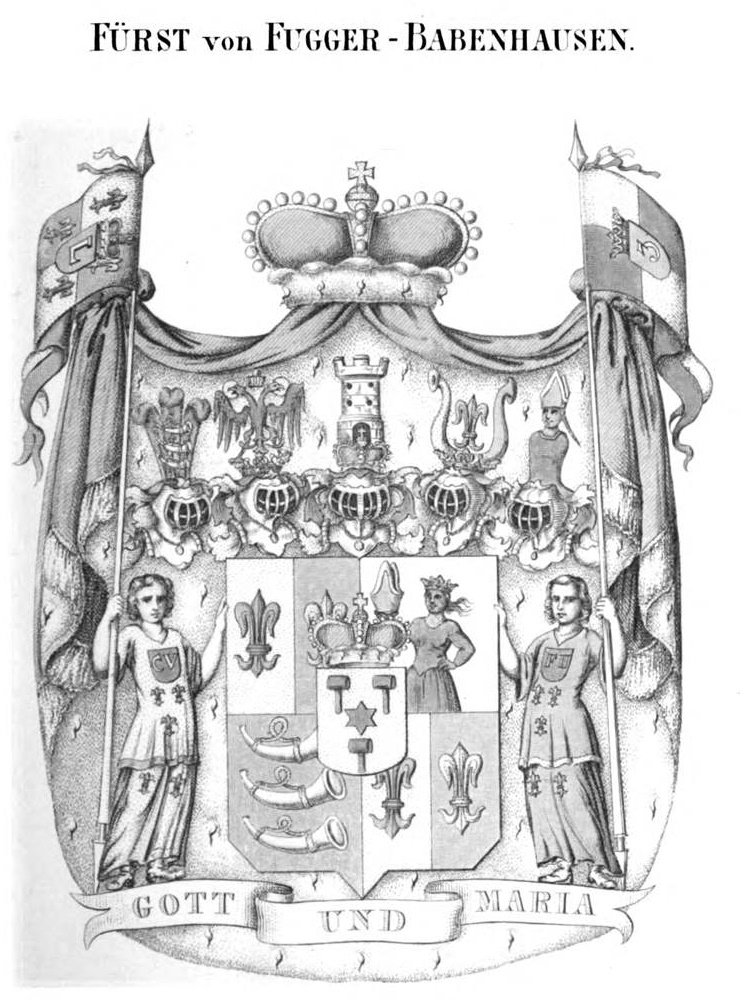
Coat of arms of the Princes of Fugger-Babenhausen

- Anselm, 1st Prince 1803–1821 (1766–1821), m. Countess Maria Antonia of Waldburg zu Zeil-Wurzach
  - Anton, 2nd Prince 1821–1836 (1800–1836), m. Princess Franziska of Hohenlohe-Bartenstein und Jagstberg
    - Leopold, 3rd Prince 1836–1885 (1827–1885), m. Countess Anna von Gatterburg
    - Karl, 4th Prince 1885–1906 (1829–1906), m. Countess Friederike von Christalnigg von und zu Gillitzstein
      - Karl, 5th Prince 1906–1925 (1861–1925), m. Princess Eleonore of Hohenlohe-Bartenstein
        - Georg, 6th Prince 1925–1934 (1889–1934), m. Countess Elisabeth von Plessen
          - Friedrich Carl, 7th Prince 1934–1979 (1914–1979), m. Countess Gunilla Bielke

=== Gallery ===
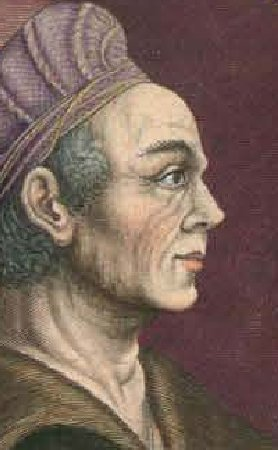
Ulrich Fugger the Elder (1441–1510)

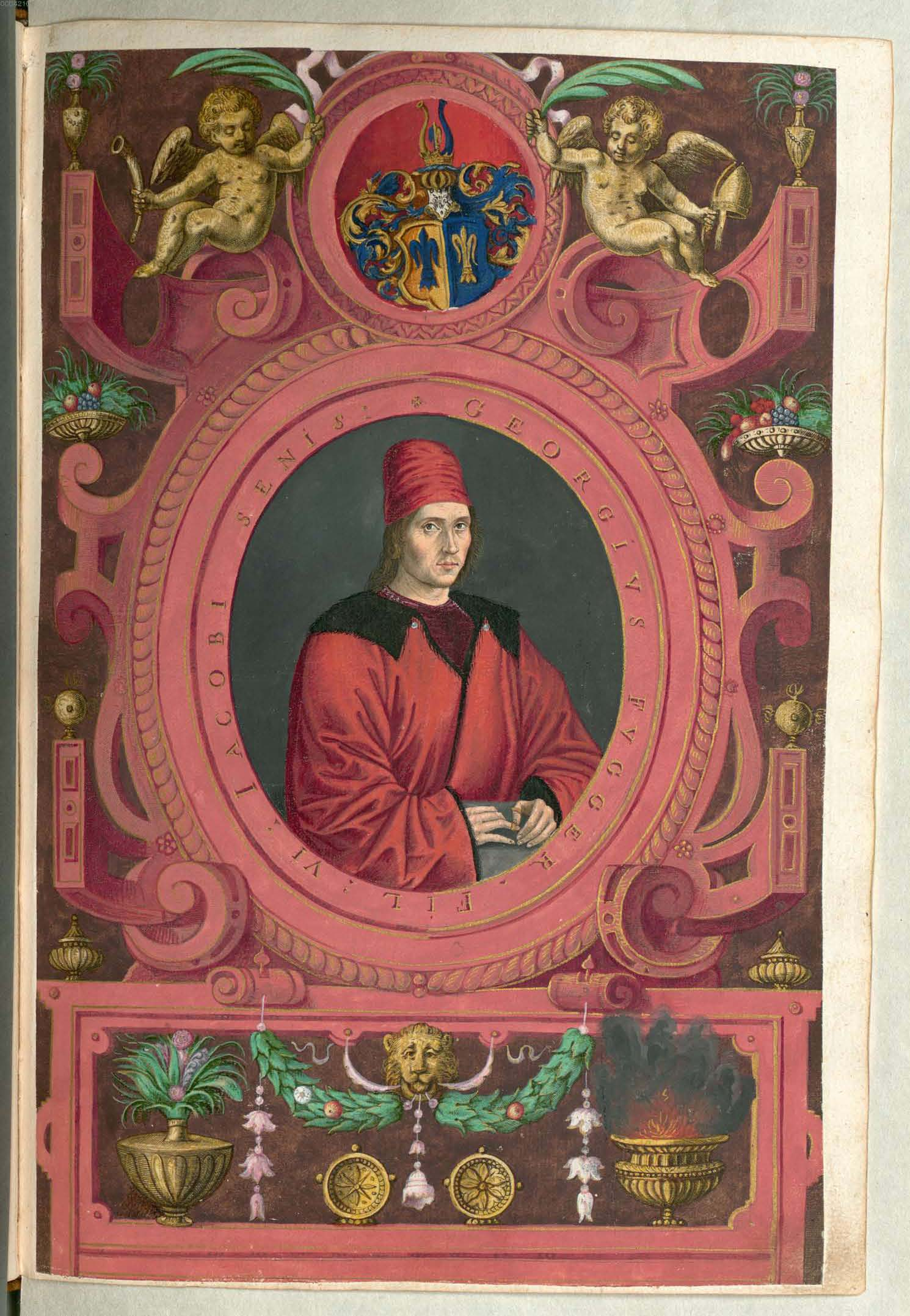
Georg Fugger (1453–1506)

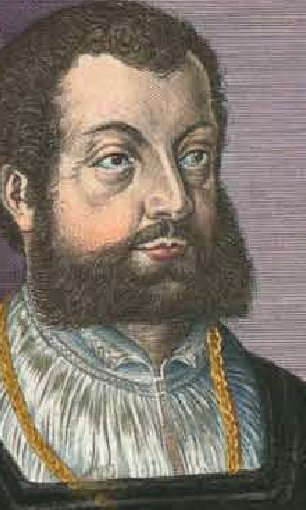
Raymund Fugger (1489–1535)

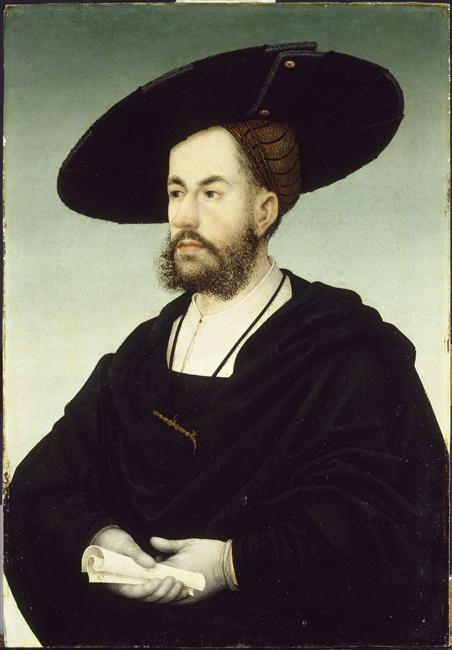
Anton Fugger (1493–1560)

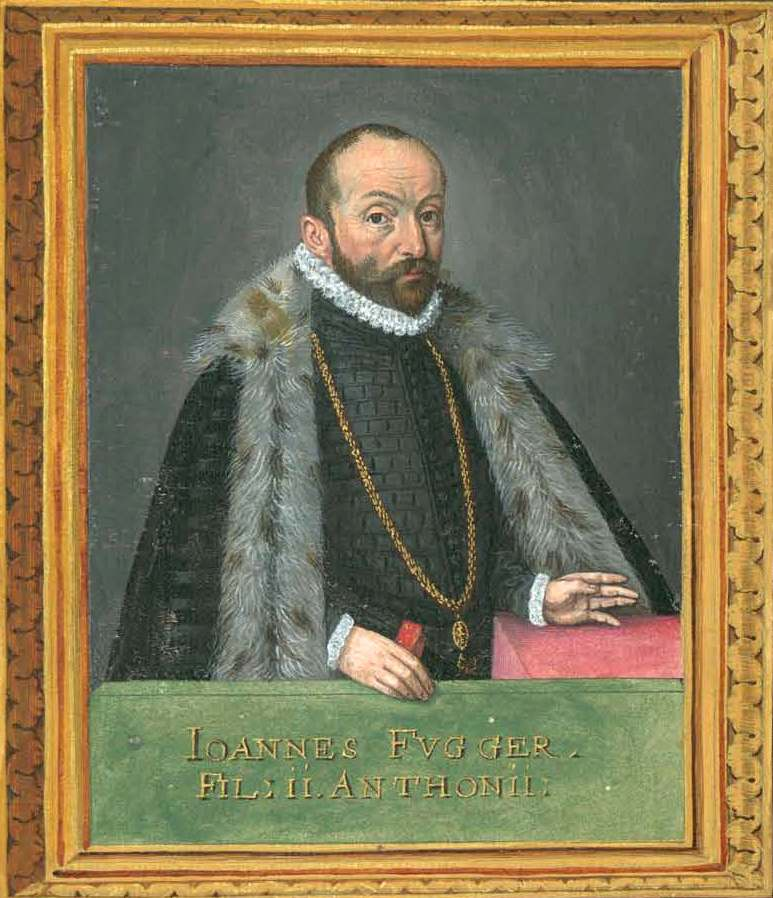
Hans (III.) Fugger (1531–1598)

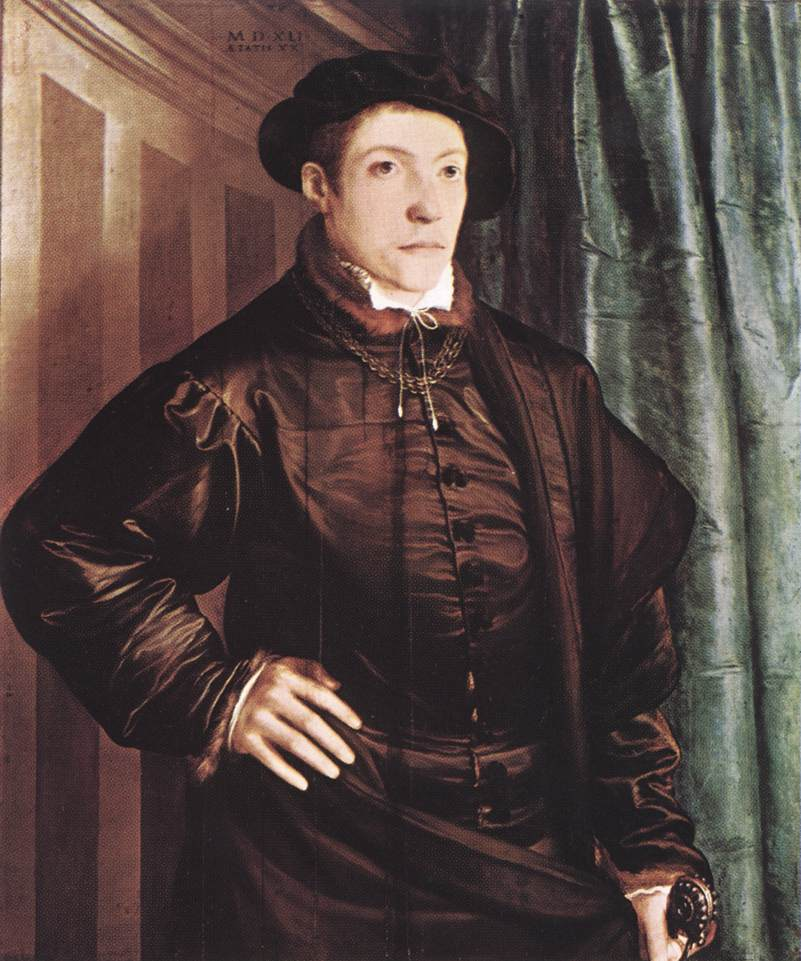
Christoph Fugger, by Christoph Amberger, 1541

== Acquisitions ==
- Kirchberg and Weißenhorn with Wullenstetten and Pfaffenhofen (Roth) (1507)
- Schmiechen (1508)
- Biberbach (1514)
- Gablingen (1527)
- Mickhausen (1528)
- Burgwalden (1529; Burgwalden, in Landkreis Augsburg, Bavaria)
- Oberndorf an der Donau (1533)
- Lands in Hungary (1535)
- Pflege Donauwörth (1536)
- Glött (1537)
- Babenhausen und Brandenburg (1539)
- Pleß (1546)
- Rettenbach (1547)
- Lands in Alsace (1551)
- Kirchheim (1551)
- Duttenstein Castle, near Dischingen (1551; Schloss Duttenstein, in Landkreis Heidenheim, Baden-Württemberg)
- Eppishausen (1551)
- Niederalfingen (1551)
- Stettenfels Castle (1551; Burg Stettenfels, in Landkreis Heilbronn, Baden-Württemberg)
- Reichau, near Boos (1551)
- Kettershausen und Bebenhausen (1558)

The following historic buildings are still owned by the Fugger family:

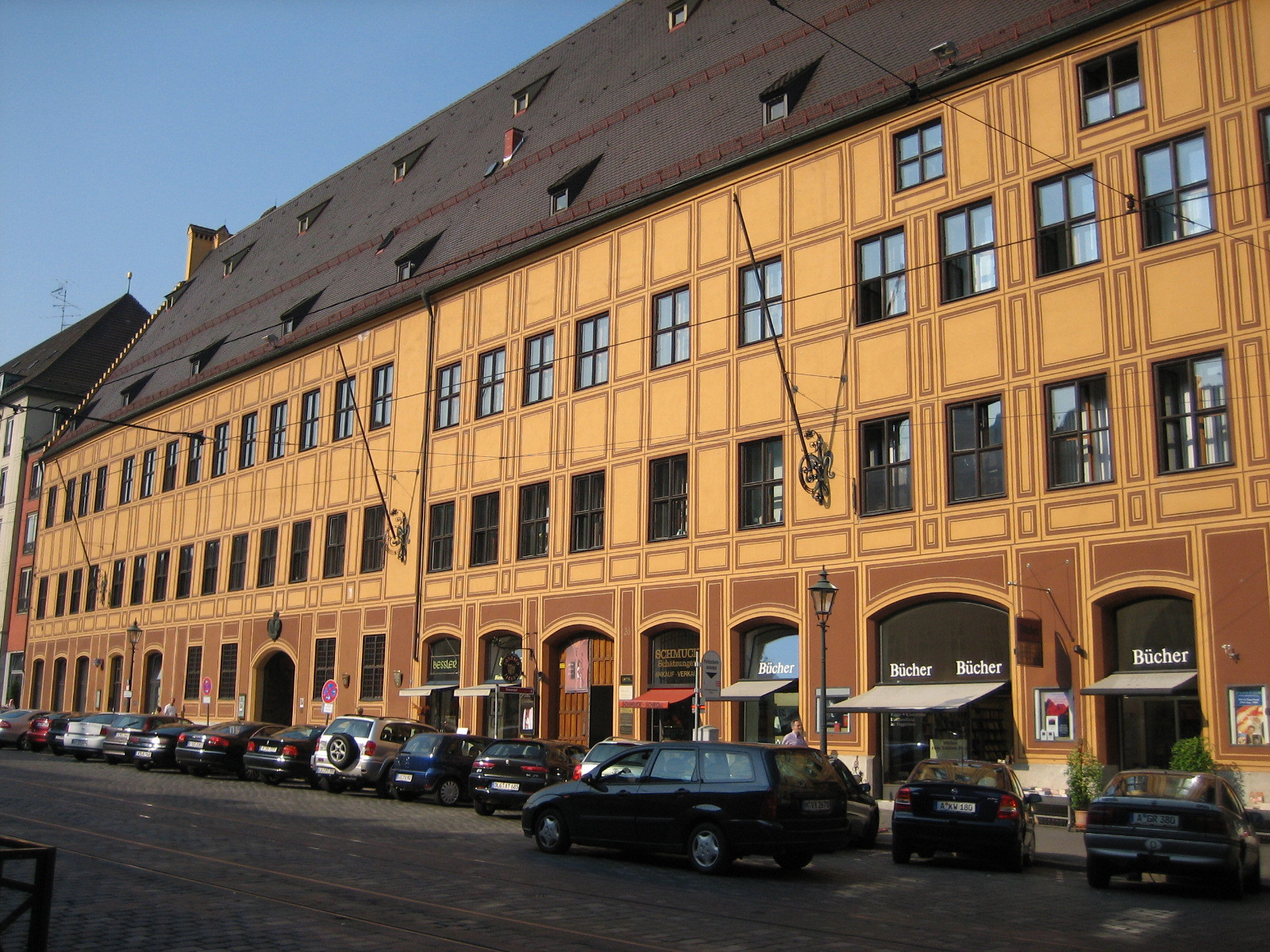
Fuggerhäuser in Augsburg

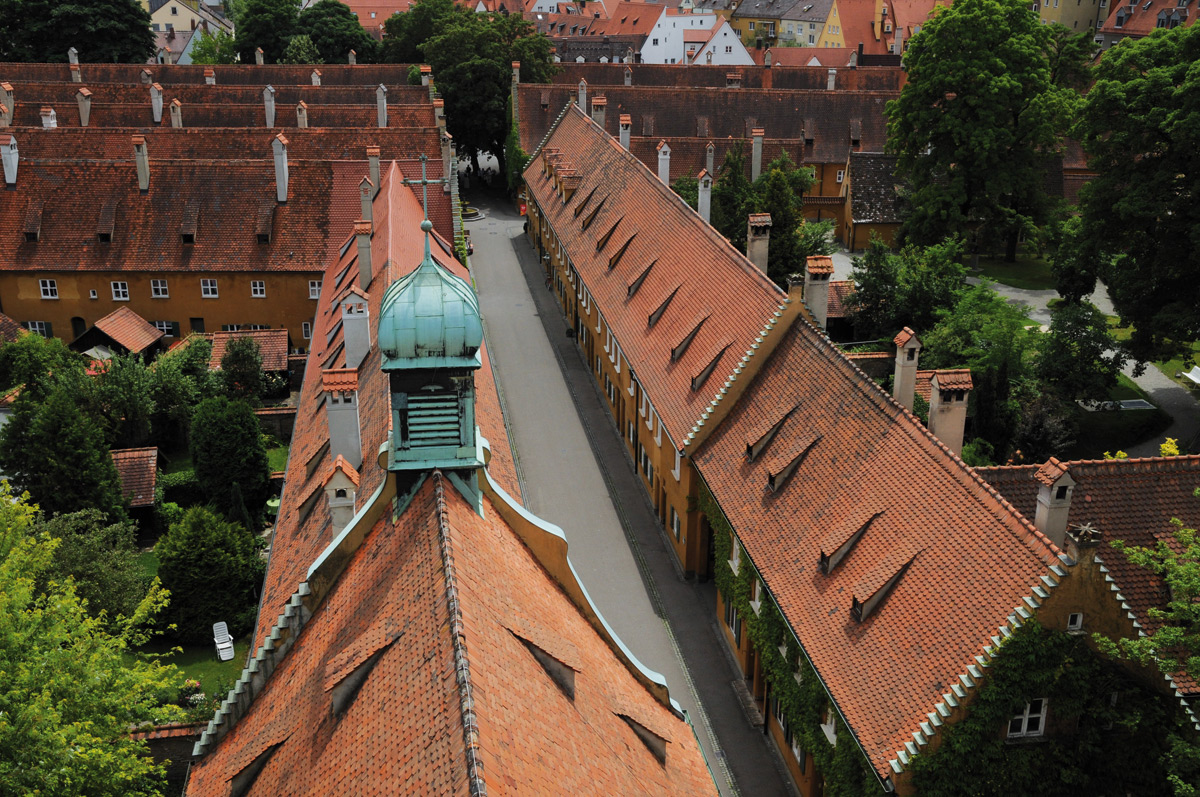
Fuggerei in Augsburg

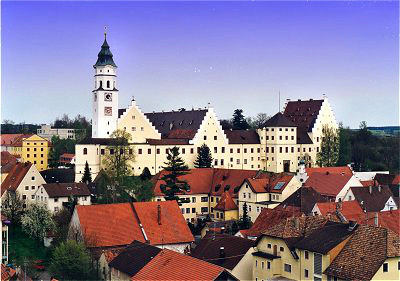
The castle at Babenhausen, Bavaria

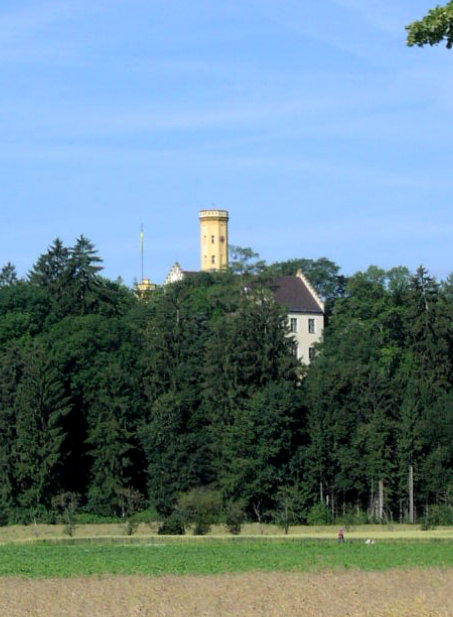
Wellenburg Castle in Augsburg

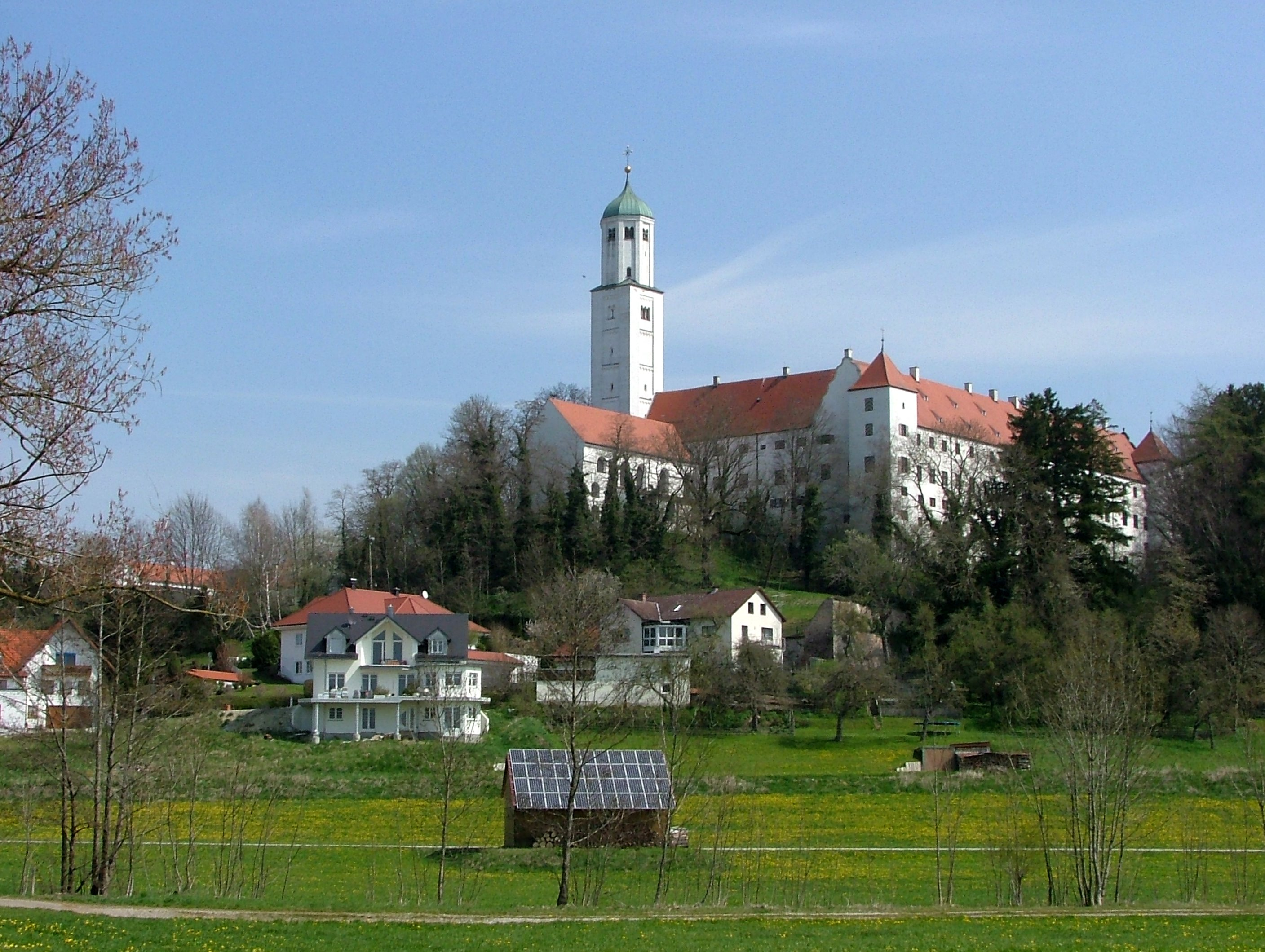
The castle at Kirchheim in Schwaben

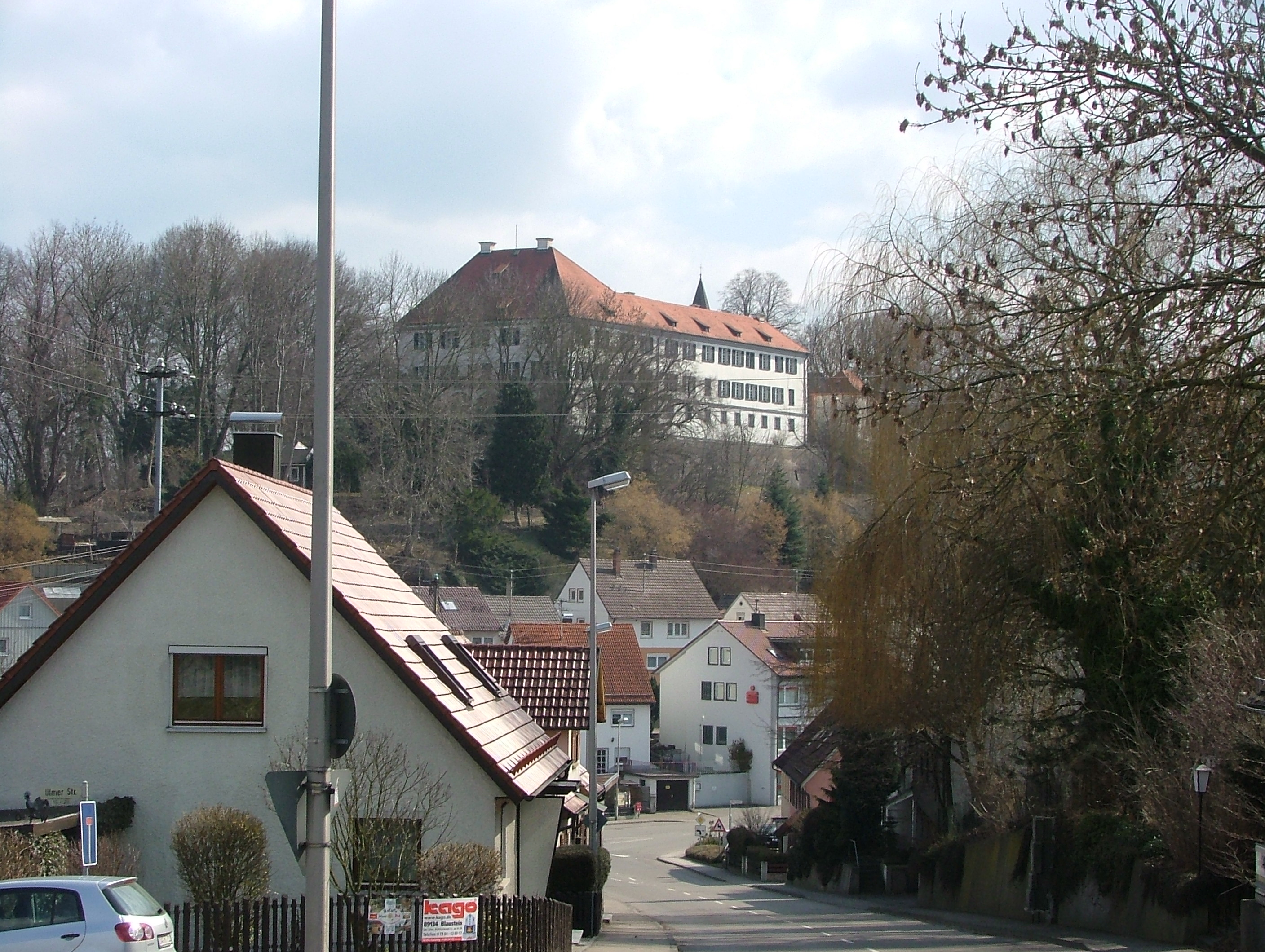
Kirchberg Castle at Illerkirchberg
