= Markus Fugger =

German politician and businessman

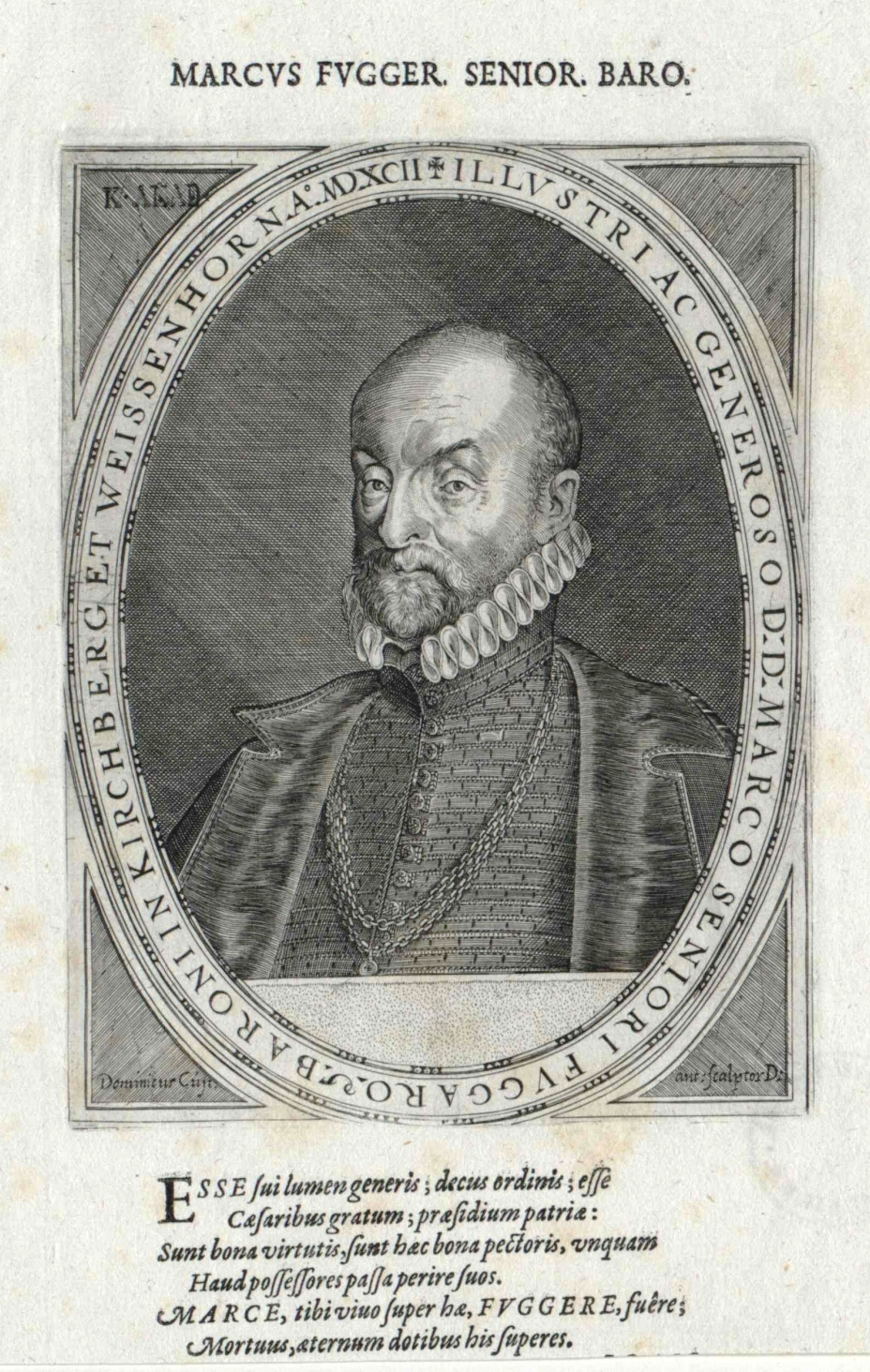
Markus Fugger d.Ä., 1529–1597. Copperplate in Custos, Atrium heroicum (1601).

Markus Fugger (born Marx Fugger; 14 February 1529 – 18 June 1597) was a German politician and businessman of the Fugger family. He was the eldest son of Anton Fugger. He achieved several high offices - chamberlain to Archduke Ernest of Austria, Kammerpräsident, member of the kurbayrische (Bavarian) council, Pfleger (reeve) in the Landshut, and city-pfleger in Augsburg.

== Life ==
On his father's death in 1560, he and his brothers Hans and Jakob jointly managed their father's business. When they split up the business in 1575, Markus took its northern division. With other family members, he took over part of the Fuggerhäuser in Augsburg. Similarly, on his father's death, as eldest son Markus led the newly founded Marx Fugger and Brothers Firm (Firma Marx Fugger und Gebrüder) for 30 years. He was interested in church history, acted as a patron to artists and collected books and antiquities, taking on Nikolaus Juvenel as a portrait painter in Augsburg. He organised sumptuous parties with hour-long firework displays. In 1595, he suffered a stroke, from which he never recovered, and so the business passed to his brother Hans.

== Marriage and issue ==
In 1557, he married Gräfin (countess) Sibylla von Eberstein (1531–1589), allying the Fugger family with a number of noble families in south-west Germany - the Margraves of Baden-Sponheim, the Counts of Hanau-Lichtenberg and the Counts of Eberstein. The marriage produced 13 children (8 girls and 5 boys), though the male-line descent from Markus died out in 1671.

== Bibliography ==
- Klaus Lötzsch: Historische Beziehungen der Grafschaft Hanau-Lichtenberg nach Schwaben im 16. Jahrhundert. Dynastische Verbindung zum Hause Fugger – Graf Philipp IV. auf dem Reichstag zu Augsburg 1566. In: Babenhäuser Mosaik = Babenhausen einst und jetzt 20. Babenhausen 1990. S. 7–19.
- Mark Häberlein: Die Fugger. Geschichte einer Augsburger Familie (1367–1650). Kohlhammer, Stuttgart 2006, ISBN 978-3-17-018472-5
- Franz Herre: Die Fugger in ihrer Zeit, Wißner Verlag, Augsburg, 12. Auflage, 2005 ISBN 3-89639-490-8
- Martin Kluger: Die Fugger. Die deutschen Medici in und um Augsburg, Context Verlag, Augsburg 2009 ISBN 978-3-939645-13-9
- Literature on and by Markus Fugger in the catalogue of the Deutschen Nationalbibliothek
