= Georg Fugger =

German merchant

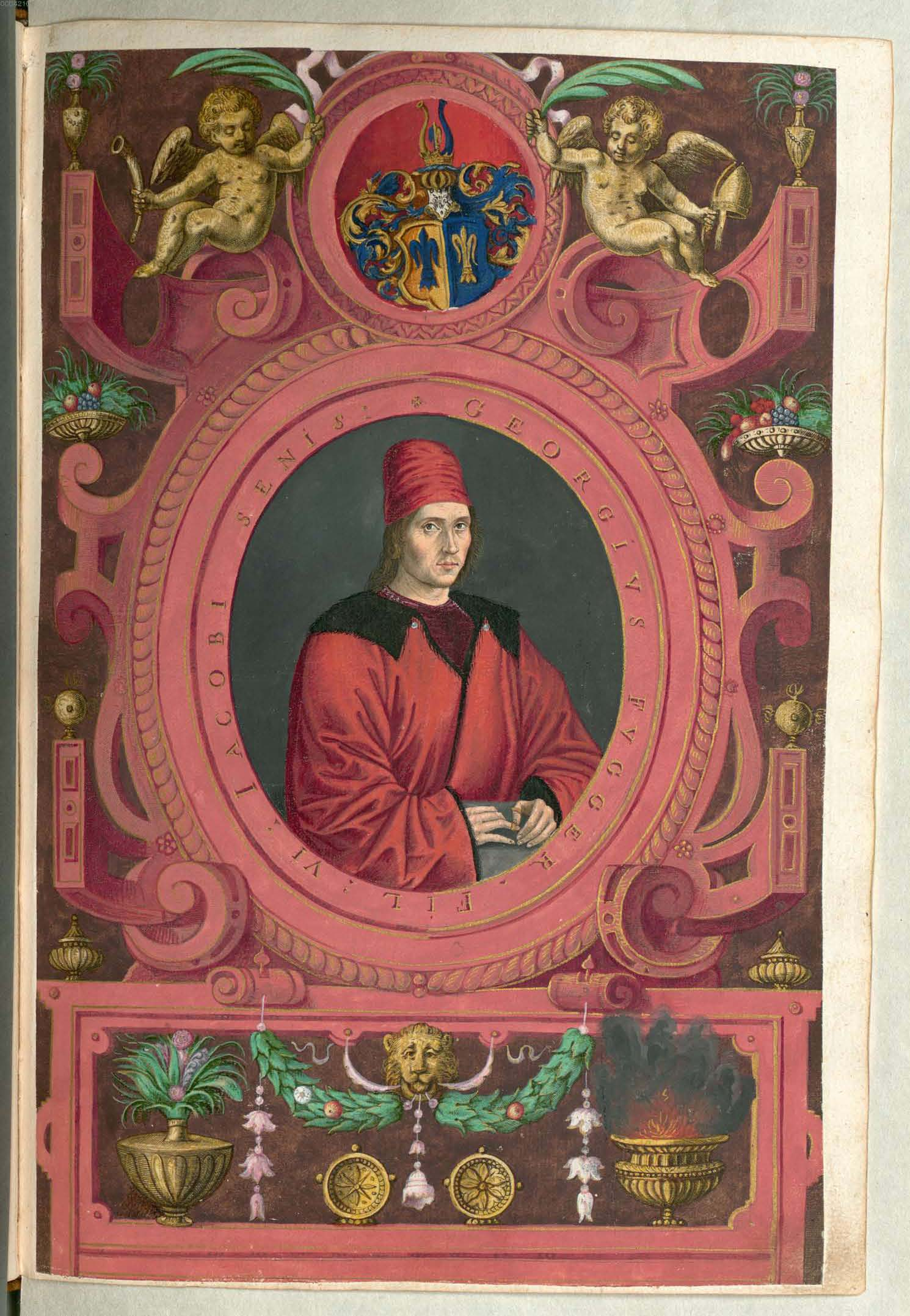
Georg Fugger – coloured copperplate from Fuggerorum et Fuggerarum imagines, 1618

Georg Fugger von der Lilie (1453–1506) was a German merchant of the Fugger dynasty.

== Life ==
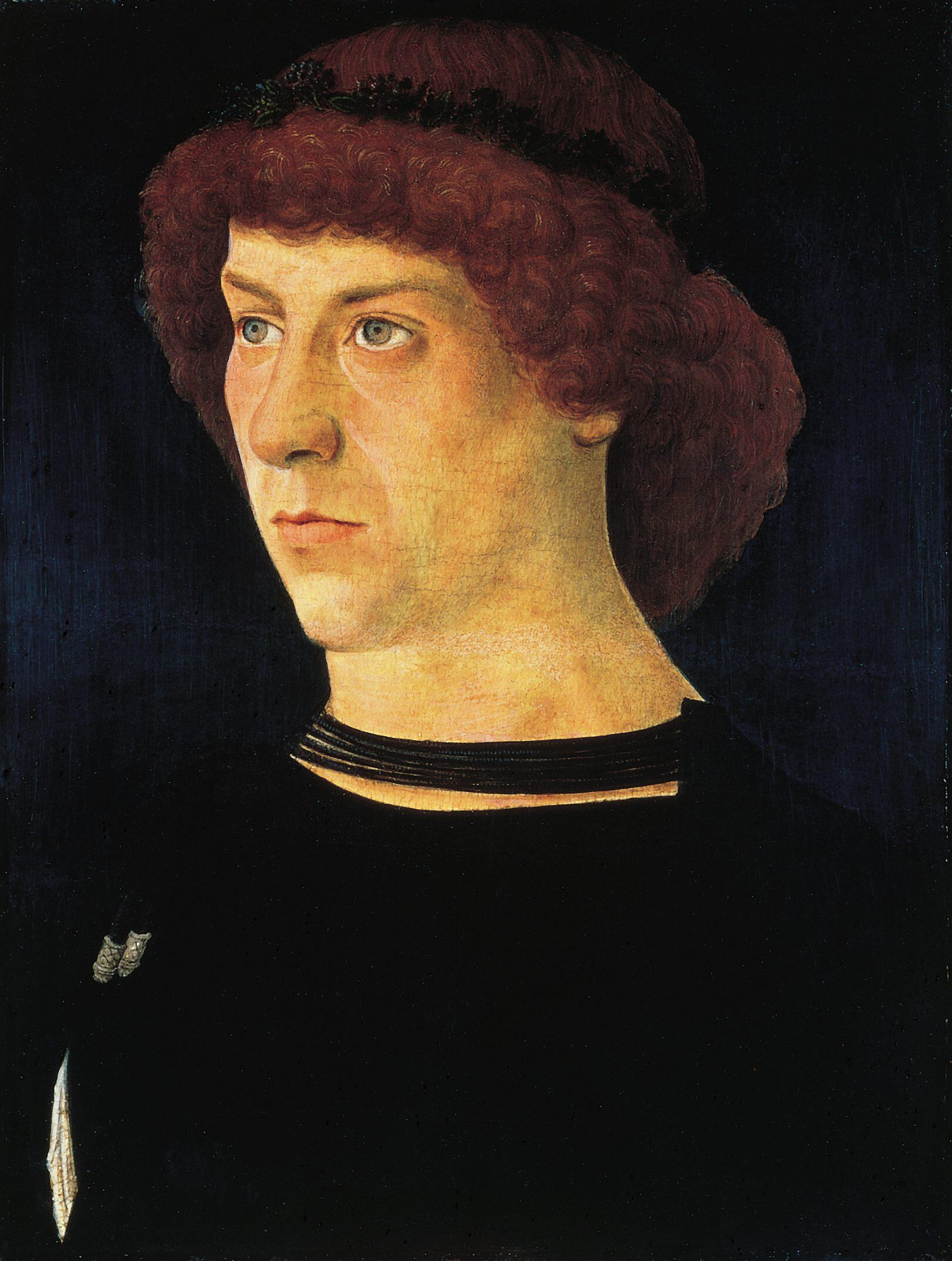
Portrait of Georg Fugger by Giovanni Bellini, 1474

A son of Jakob Fugger the Elder and his wife Barbara Bäsinger (whose sons also included Ulrich and Jakob the Younger), Georg was born and died in Augsburg; it became clear early in life that he would become a merchant. The "Ulrich Fugger und seine Gesellschaft" (Ulrich Fugger and his company) firm was the first general partnership in Europe and soon changed its name to the "Ulrich Fugger und Gebrüder von Augsburg" (Ulrich Fugger and Brothers of Augsburg) when Georg joined it. Ulrich headed its headquarters in Augsburg, with Georg heading its Nuremberg branch and Jakob handling international affairs.

The firm was so successful that Georg was able to commission his portrait from the Venetian painter Giovanni Bellini in 1474. In 1494, the firm made over 54,000 Guilders and the three brothers were also co-founders of the Fuggerei, the oldest social housing project in the world. The House of "Fugger vom Reh" also ran a different Fugger firm at this time, though this was soon to go bankrupt.

== Marriage and issue ==
In 1486, he married Regina Imhoff, daughter of a patrician of Nuremberg. Their son Markus (Marx) was born in 1488, followed by Raymund in 1489. These sons made Georg the founder of the "von Kirchberg" and "von Weißenhorn" lines of the Fugger family. Another son, Anton, was born in 1493 – he later became head of Jakob Fugger the Younger's family business and founder of the "von Glött" and "von Babenhausen" princely lines of the Fugger family. This makes Georg Fugger the founder of all the extant lines of the house of "Fugger von der Lilie".

== Bibliography ==
- (in German) Franz Herre: Die Fugger in ihrer Zeit, Wißner Verlag, Augsburg 12. Auflage, 2005 ISBN 3-89639-490-8
- (in German) Martin Kluger: Die Fugger. Die deutschen Medici in und um Augsburg, Context Verlag, Augsburg 2009 ISBN 978-3-939645-13-9
- (in German) Martha Schad: Die Frauen des Hauses Fugger. Mit sanfter Macht zu Weltruhm, Piper Verlag, München 2009 ISBN 978-3-492-23818-2
