= Lukas Fugger =

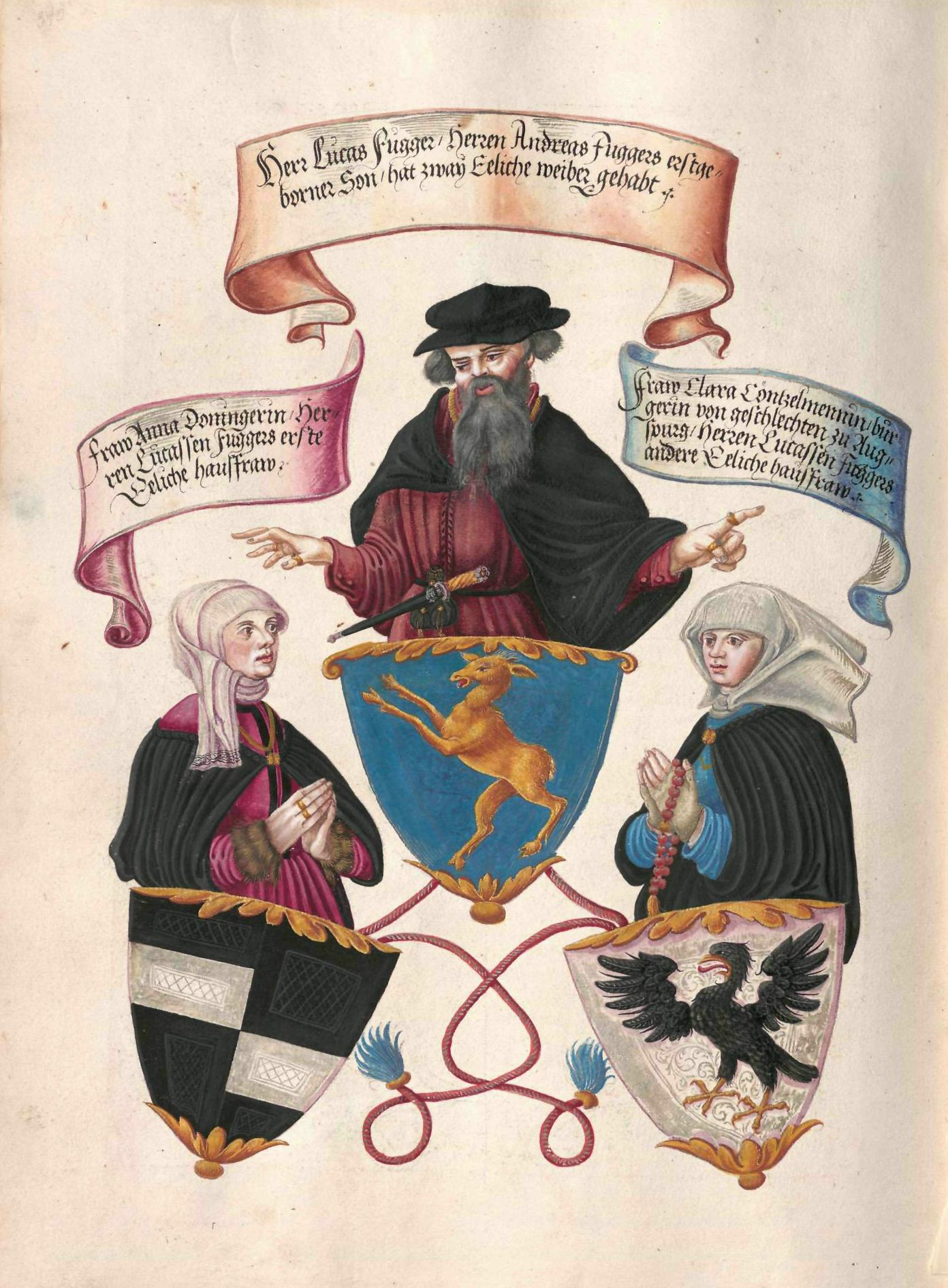
Lukas Fugger vom Reh with his two spouses Anna b. Dauninger and Clara b. Contzelmann by Jörg Breu the Younger (from Geheime Ehrenbuch der Fugger)

Lukas I. Fugger vom Reh (1439 - after 1512) was a German businessman and member of the Fugger family.

He was the second eldest son of Andreas Fugger. Lukas had three brothers, Jakob (about 1430-1505), Matthäus (1442-1489/92), Hans (1443-1501), and five sisters. Together with his brothers, he got the emblem "Fugger vom Reh" by emperor Friedrich III. It was the first emblem of the Fugger family. Lukas Fugger was a very successful salesman and he was the chief of the Fugger company, but after all he made an essential mistake. He awarded a loan to the Habsburg family, which was never repaid. He had received a Surety on account of the town of Leuven, but the town refused to cover it. Lukas and his family went bankrupt. He took refuge to Graben, Bavaria, which is the native place of the Fugger family. Lukas Fugger was married twice. His first wife was Anna Dauninger and, after she died, he married Clara Contzelmann in 1488. Lukas had 13 children altogether. His male line went extinct in 1576 due to the death of his great-grandchild Bartholomäus (1526-1576).
