= Glött =

- Municipality
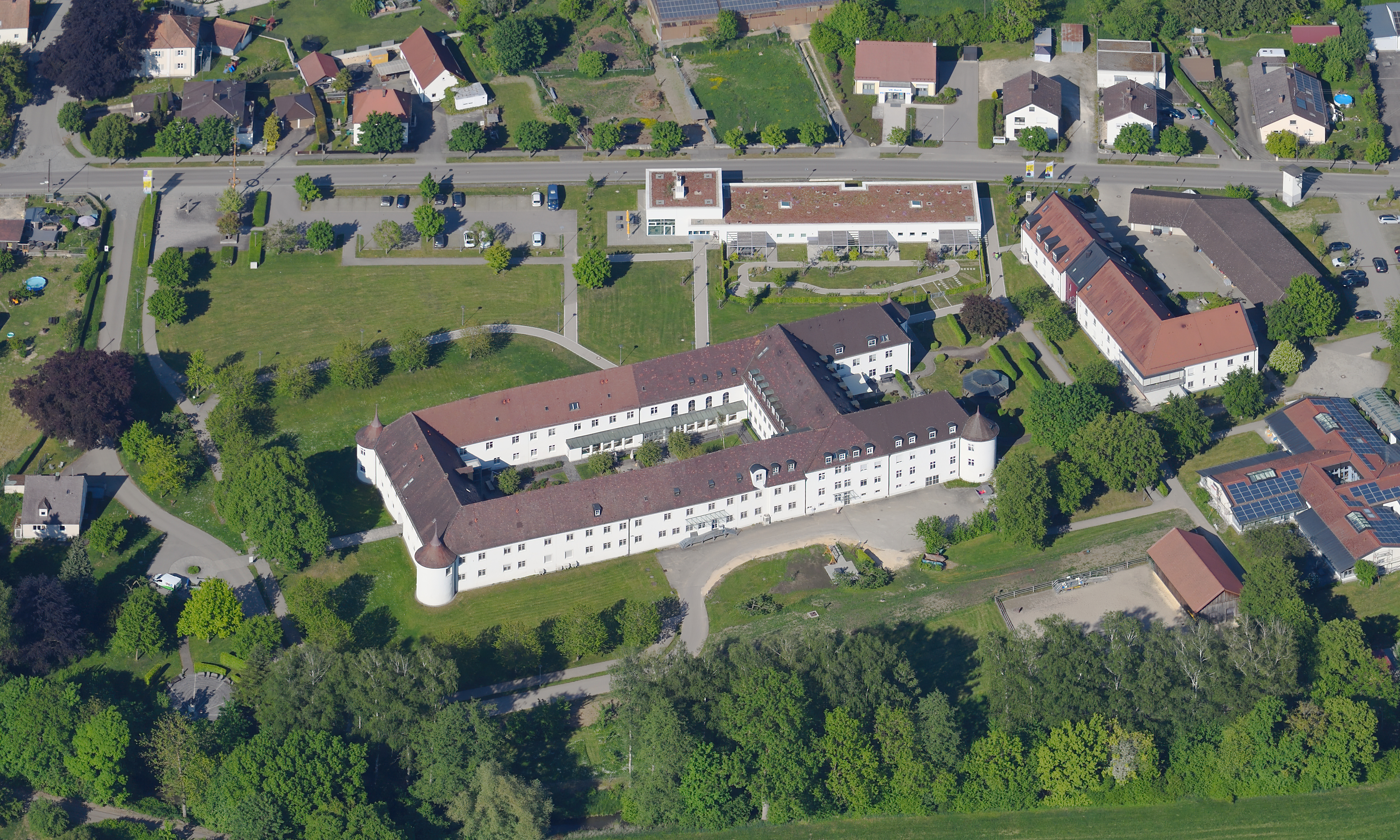
- Glött Castle

- Coat of arms

- Location of Glött within Dillingen district
- Interactive map of Glött
- Location within Germany Location within Bavaria
- Coordinates: 48°30′N 10°29′E
- Country: Germany
- State: Bavaria
- Admin. region: Schwaben
- District: Dillingen
- Municipal assoc.: Holzheim

Government
  - Mayor (2020–26): Fridrich Käßmeyer (CSU)

Area
  - Total: 10.99 km^{2} (4.24 sq mi)
- Elevation: 449 m (1,473 ft)

Population (2025-12-31)
  - Total: 1,085
  - Density: 98.73/km^{2} (255.7/sq mi)
- Time zone: UTC+01:00 (CET)
  - Summer (DST): UTC+02:00 (CEST)
- Postal codes: 89353
- Dialling codes: 09075
- Vehicle registration: DLG
- Website: www.glött.de

Glött is a municipality in the district of Dillingen in Bavaria in Germany.

== History ==
Glött castle and estates were purchased by Anton Fugger in 1537. The Lordship of Glött became part of the Kingdom of Bavaria in 1806. The current municipality was founded in 1818. The castle remained in the ownership of the counts Fugger von Glött until 1869. Thereafter they moved to Kirchheim in Schwaben.
