= Johann Christoph Fugger =

German businessman (1561–1612)

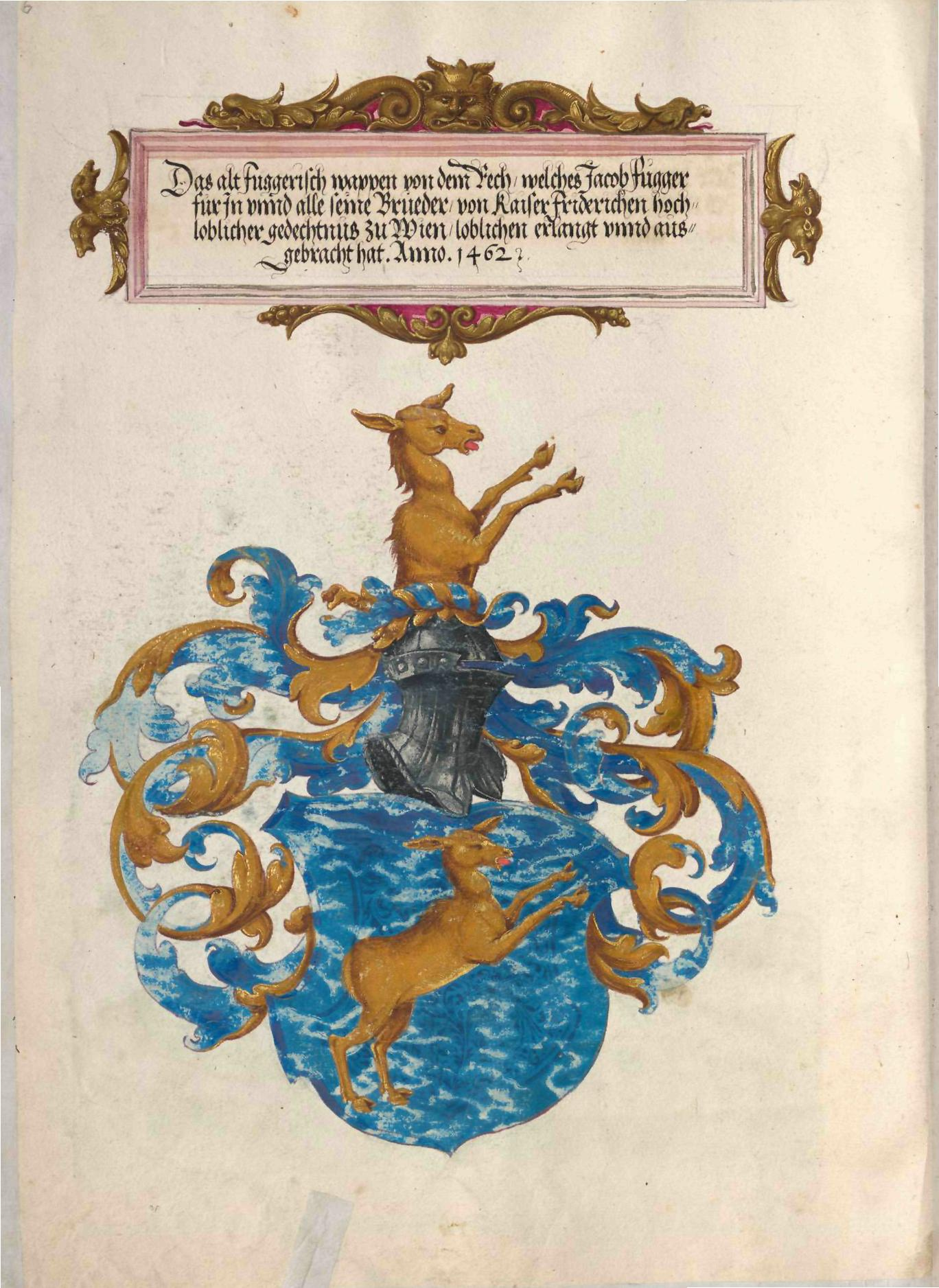
Coat of arms of Fugger vom Reh family

Johann Christoph Fugger (1561–1612) was a German nobleman and businessman.

== Early life and ancestry ==
Born as the tenth child and sixth son of Wolfgang Fugger von Reh (1519/20–1568) and his wife, Margarethe Tetzel, whose family were part of Patriciate of the Imperial City of Nuremberg. He was the last surviving member of this branch of the Fugger family.

== Biography ==
He was employed at the royal court in Prague. In 1603, he married Regina Greiner (b. 1565), widow of Christoph Buroner from Augsburg (1535-1601). Johann Christoph was a member of the German nobility. His grandfather, Gastel Fugger (1475–1539), was the one awarded with a patent of nobility. Johann Christoph Fugger had no descendants. Contemporary members of the Fugger vom Reh are descendants of Matthäus Fugger (1442-1489/92). The current head of the family is Markus Fugger von dem Rech (born 1970).

== Sources ==
- Marianne Fugger, Markus Fugger: Genealogie des Hauses Fugger vom Reh – Stammtafeln und biographische Erläuterungen, Wißner Verlag, Augsburg 2007, ISBN 978-3-89639-631-0.
