= Stettenfels Castle =

Castle in Untergruppenbach, Heilbronn district, Baden-Württemberg, Germany

- Untergruppenbach
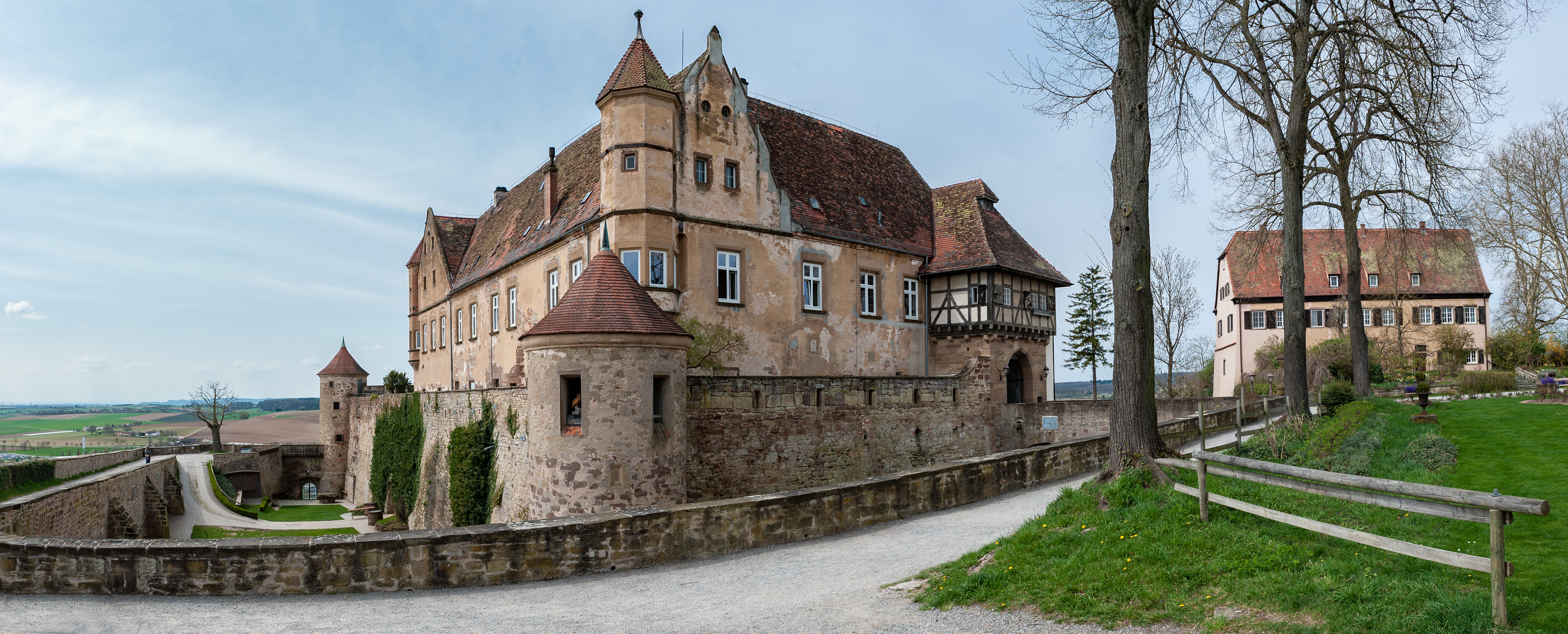
- Stettenfels Castle

Site information
- Type: hill castle
- Code: DE-BW
- Condition: preserved or largely preserved

Location
- Location within Baden-Württemberg Location within Germany
- Coordinates: 49°05′22″N 9°16′54″E

Site history
- Built: From 1000 to 1100

Stettenfels Castle is a medieval castle above the town of Untergruppenbach in Heilbronn. It was once owned by Hans Fugger and is now used for cultural events.

== History ==
The castle was built in the 11th century, probably at about the same time as many other castles in the area. From 1356 Stettenfels was owned by Burkhard, Knight of Sturmfeder. From 1462 to 1478, the Lords of Helmstatt owned of the castle. With the 1504 victory of Ulrich, Duke of Wurttemberg in the Landshut War of Succession the castle became a fief of Württemberg under Marshal Konrad Thumb of Neuburg in 1507. His son Hans Konrad Thumb of Neuburg sold the fief in 1527 to Philip of Hirnheim, the Reformer of Gruppenbach.

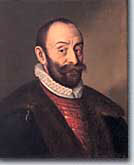
The castle's owner during the Renaissance, Hans Fugger

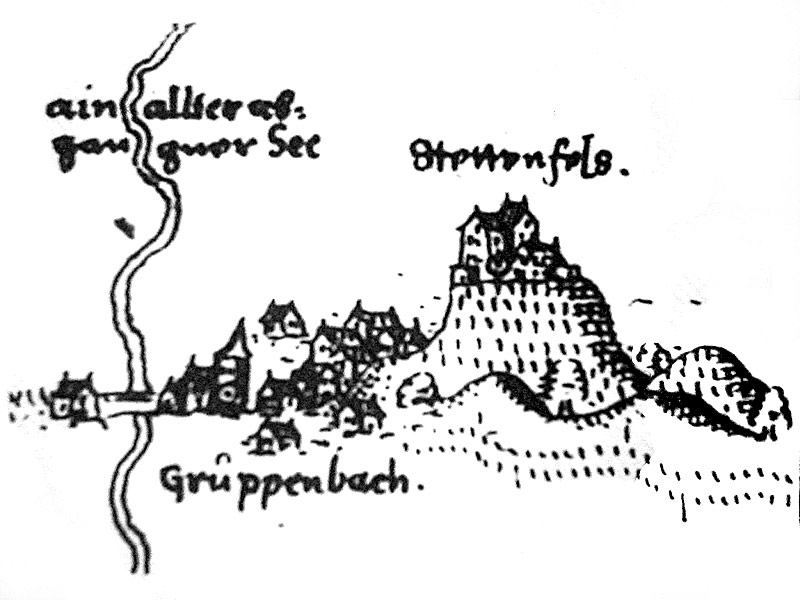
Stettenfels Castle above Gruppenbach on a map from 1598

In 1551 Anton Fugger, a nephew of Jakob the Rich, acquired the castle grounds. His son Hans Fugger had the castle remodelled into a Renaissance chateau in 1576 by the architect Wendel Dietrich. In 1594 the castle burnt down, but was rebuilt by Dietrich. In the 18th century Fugger attempted to establish a Capuchin hospice, but the buildings were destroyed in 1735. Karl Eugen, Duke of Württemberg acquired the site in 1747. In 1829 the municipality of Gruppenbach acquired the ownership and reserved rights for later sale. In the 18th, 19th and 20th centuries the castle was repeatedly renovated. In 1852 the tanner Friedrich Korn from Calw bought the estate, and sold it in 1858 to the Hamburg businessman Anton Mayer, who in turn sold it in 1881 to the landlord Friedrich Bürkle. Until 1888 the site was home to the state forestry office, at which point it was acquired by the Weinberger farmer Christian Hildt.

In 1901 the castle was bought by the Cologne lawyer Dr. Walter Putsch, who renovated the building in a contemporary style. In 1918 the von Haldenwang family bought the property. In 1924, Siegfried Levy, from Kornwestheim, who with his family owned the company Salamander Shoes, acquired the facility in which he established a stud farm. On 5 October 1937 the castle was "Aryanized" (nationalized, i.e., seized by the Nazis and the Jewish owners fled to South Africa. In 1939, the old medieval bailey was rebuilt and parts of the castle were demolished to produce an "Ordensburg" for the Nazi party. The war ended before the reconstruction could be completed.

After the Second World War the site was initially under American asset management. From 1946, the Lutheran Church operated a retreat and retirement home in the castle. In 1951 the castle was returned through a restitution process to the widow of Siegfried Levy, whose family sold the castle to Friedrich Spieser in 1957. It was sold to the architect Roland Fleiner Weimar in 1994.

== Current use ==
The castle is now open to the public. Community concerts and theater events are held at the castle. The private owners rent out the rooms of the castle for events such as receptions, and there is a permanent beer garden in the castle grounds. The grounds are used for a variety of agriculture, including vineyards, and a stud farm.

Every year since 2005 the castle has hosted a medieval festival with jousting tournaments, jugglers, music and artisans. Since 2007 the festival has been held on May 1 and the subsequent weekend, and now has hundreds of contributors and thousands of visitors.

== Grounds ==
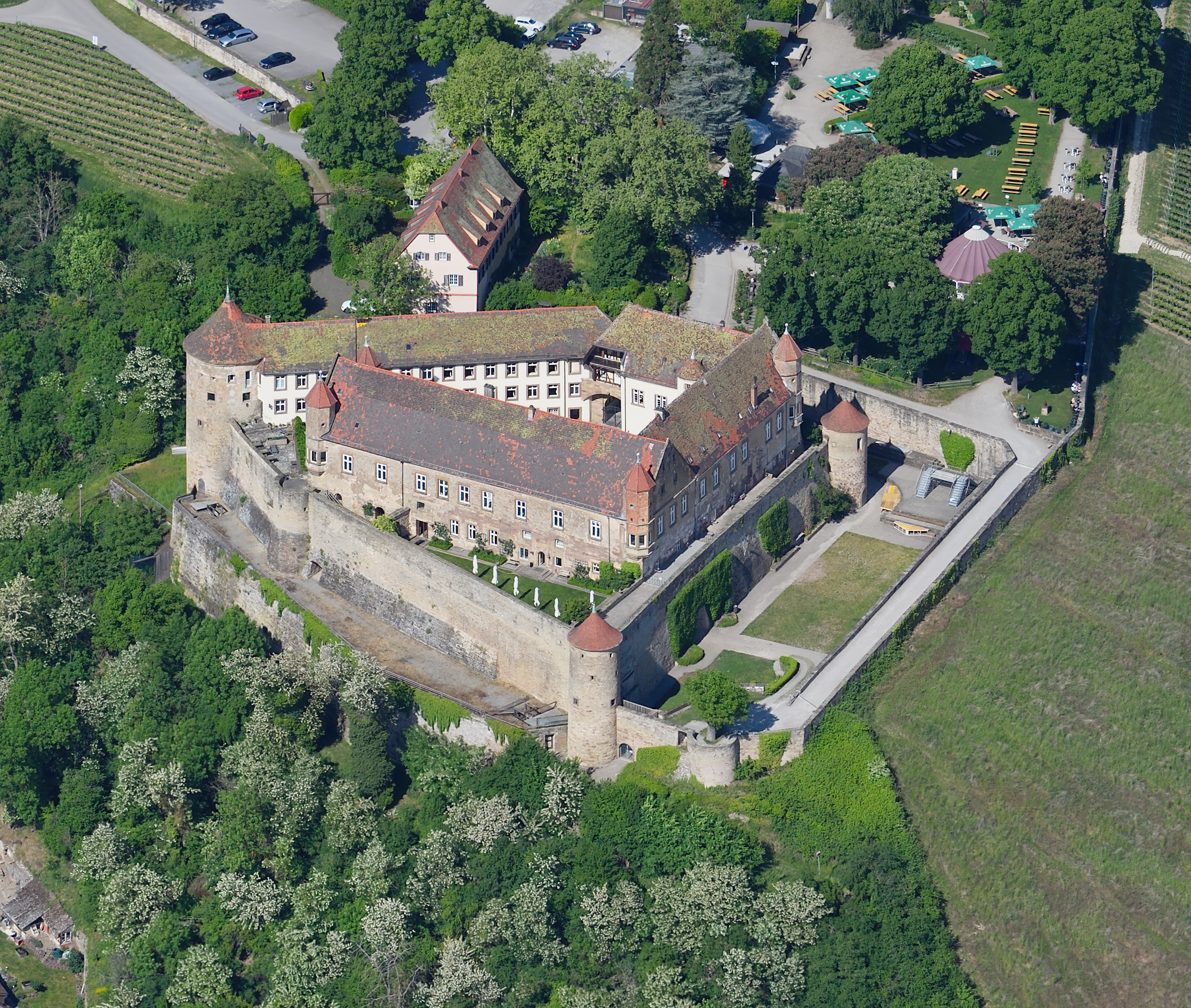
Aerial photograph

Stettenfels castle is east of the historic town center on a sandstone ridge. The castle is surrounded by a broad moat, with three old towers. Over a massive bridge, a gatehouse leads to the triangular castle courtyard, dominated by a fountain and surrounded by various residential buildings of the castle. The moat is accessible and, more recently there is also a fixed stage set up within the moat for events.

Noticeable in the courtyard is the historic staircase tower. While most buildings in the grounds date back to the renaissance castle, the staircase tower is marked by recent rebuilding. Until well into the 20th century, the facade of the residential building and the staircase tower was just a timber balustrade, but the former archways of the commercial areas on the ground floor are now largely walled.

Just beyond the moat to the east of the actual castle are some historic farm buildings, and some modern restaurant buildings.

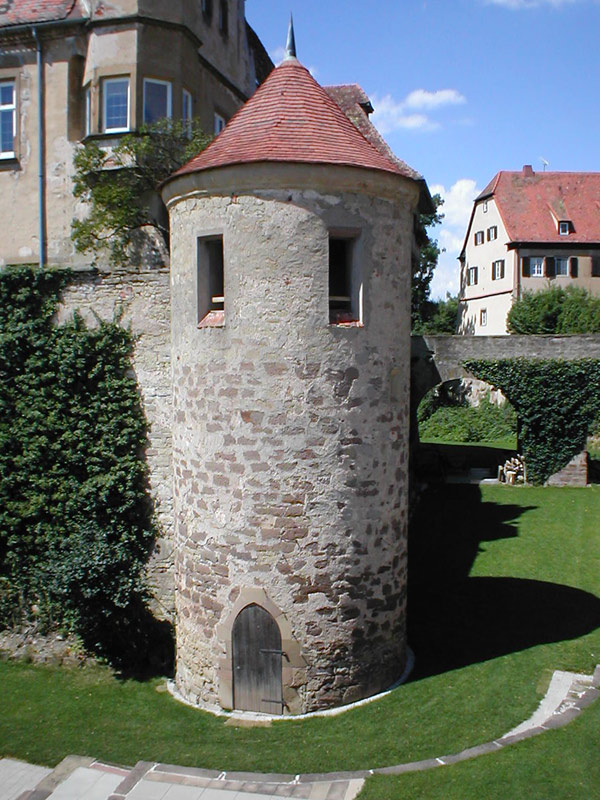
Moat and east tower

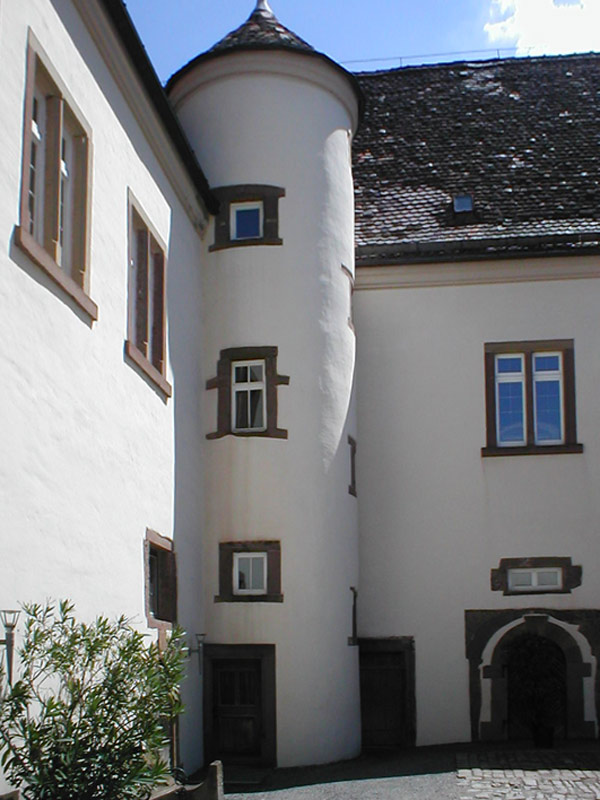
Stair tower

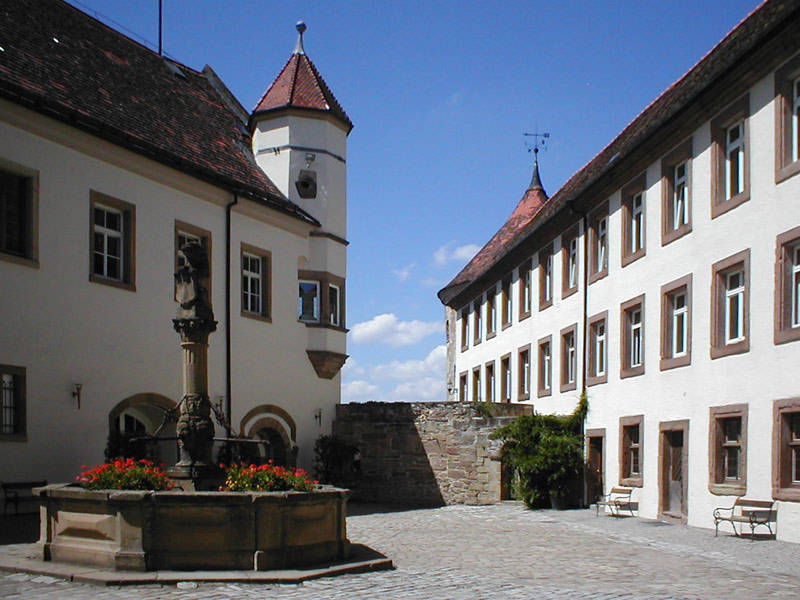
Inner yard

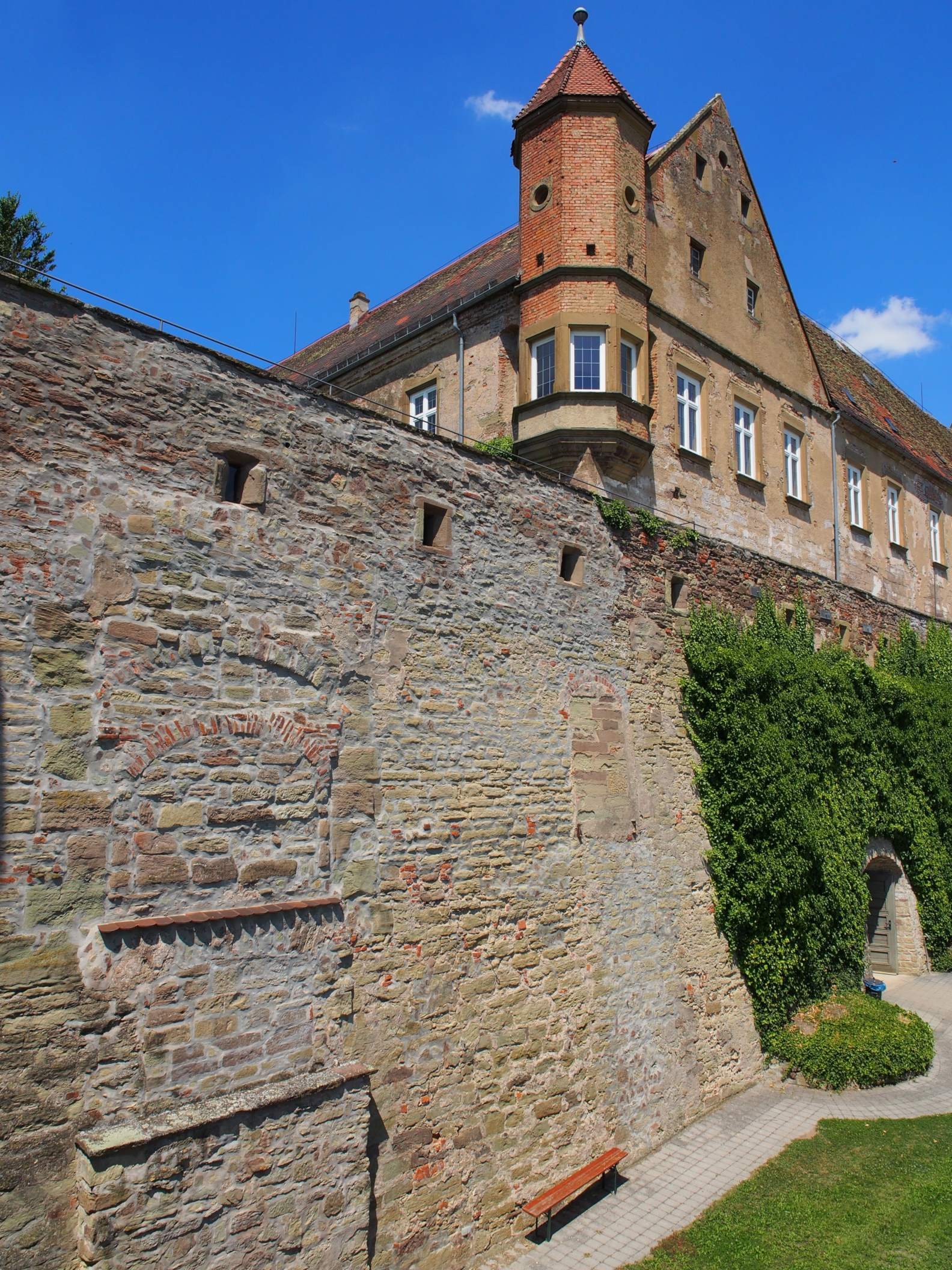
bricked-up doorways
