= Jakob Fugger the Elder =

German merchant (1398–1469)

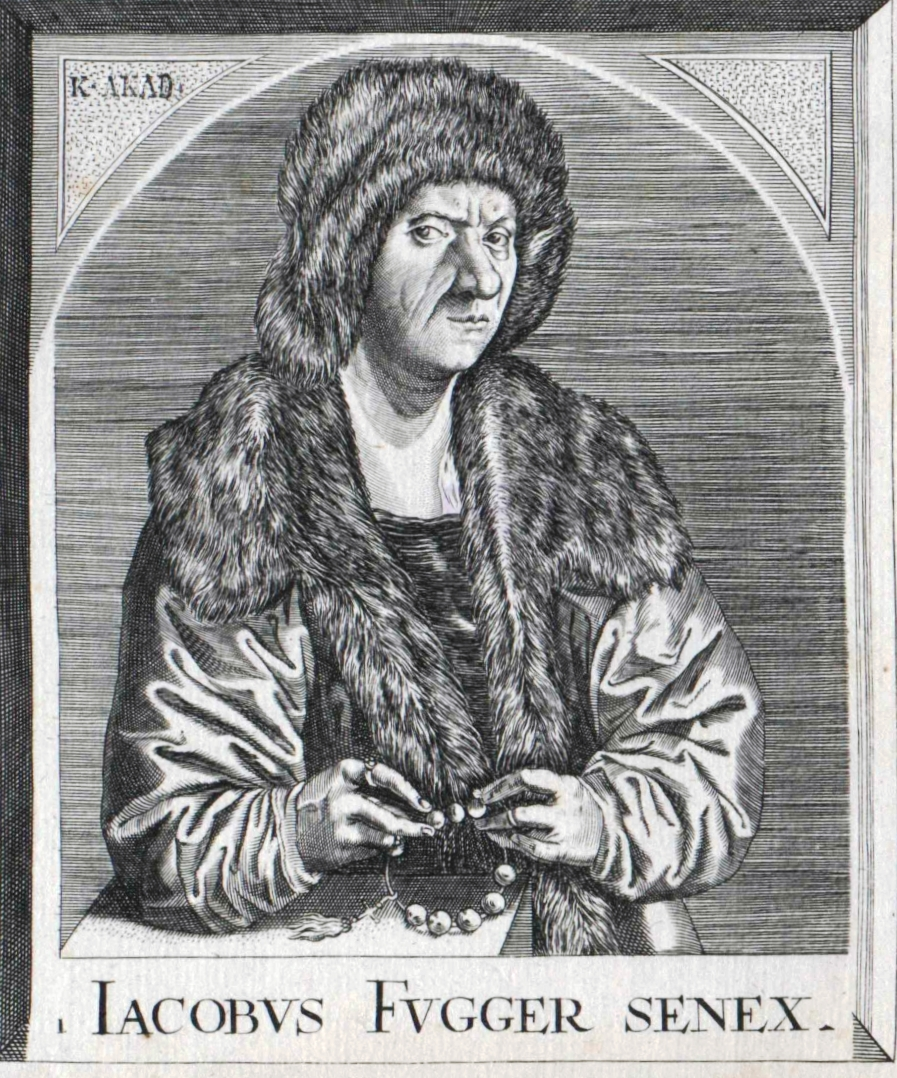
Jakob Fugger the Elder

Jakob Fugger (1398 in Augsburg – 1469 in Augsburg) was a German master weaver, town councillor and merchant, as well as the founder of the Fugger dynasty. He was later known as Jakob Fugger the Elder to distinguish him from his son Jakob Fugger, who took over his father's company and oversaw its rise to be the largest and richest trading house in Europe.

== Life ==
Jakob Fugger's father was Hans Fugger. Hans came from Graben to the free city of Augsburg as a Landweber in 1367. On his death in 1408, through hard work and consecutive marriages to two industrious and well-off women, Hans left his family an on-going business and a large fortune. His widow Elisabeth Fugger-Gfattermann continued running the weaving and textile-trading side of the business until her own death in 1436. Her leadership was aided by Hans (initially) and by her sons Andreas Fugger and Jakob (both apprenticed gold-workers). During the first three decades of the 15th century, the business thrived and the family amassed a considerable fortune. On his mother's death, Andreas assumed leadership of the lucrative, but still low-level, business. After splitting up the family business in 1454, Jakob started operating on his own. By 1461, Jakob was one of the twelve richest citizens of Augsburg.

== Marriage and issue ==
On 13 April 1441, Jakob married Barbara Bäsinger, daughter of the Münzmeister Franz Bäsinger. They had eleven children, including Ulrich, Georg and Jakob Fugger.

== Sources ==
- (in German) Bayerische Staatsbibliothek München: Die Fugger im Bild. Selbstdarstellung einer Familiendynastie der Renaissance. Exhibition catalogue, Quaternio Verlag, Luzern 2010, ISBN 978-3-88008-003-4.
- (in German) Johannes Burkhardt: Das Ehrenbuch der Fugger. Facsimile, transcription and commentary, 2 Bände, Wißner Verlag, Augsburg 2004, ISBN 3-89639-445-2.
- (in German) Götz von Pölnitz: Die Fugger. 6. Auflage. Mohr & Siebeck, Tübingen 1999, ISBN 3-16-147013-3.
- (in German) Franz Herre: Die Fugger in ihrer Zeit. 12. Auflage. Wißner-Verlag, Augsburg 2005, ISBN 3-89639-490-8.
