= Portrait of Georg Fugger =

Painting by Giovanni Bellini, Norton Simon Museum

Portrait of Jörg Fugger
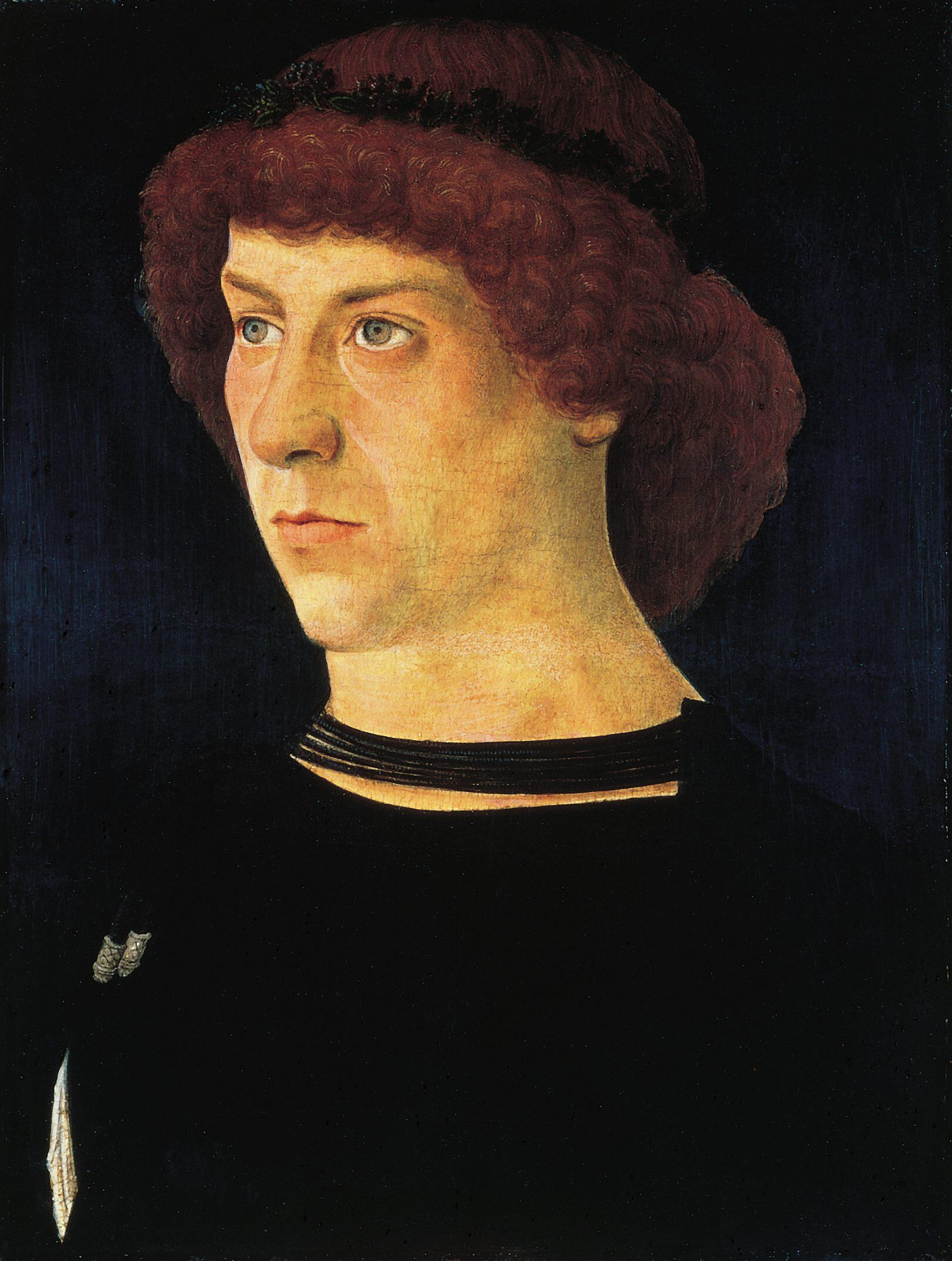
- Artist: Giovanni Bellini
- Year: 1474
- Medium: oil on panel
- Dimensions: 26 cm × 20 cm (10 in × 7.9 in)
- Location: Norton Simon Museum, Pasadena
- Website: Catalogue entry

The Portrait of Georg Fugger is a 1474 oil-on-panel portrait painting by the Italian Renaissance artist Giovanni Bellini, now in the Norton Simon Museum in Pasadena, United States. It is his earliest surviving portrait and one of the first works in oil (rather than tempera) by an Italian artist.

It can be securely dated due to an inscription on its reverse (removed during an early 20th-century restoration) reading "Jeorg Fugger a di XX di Zugno MCCCCLXXIIII" ("Georg Fugger on 20th June 1474"). He was the head of the Nuremberg branch of the German Fugger bank, which was heavily involved in the Fondaco dei Tedeschi in Venice. He wears a garland and his individual features are shown in detail, although the work lacks the psychological elements introduced to Venice in 1475 by Antonello da Messina. A copy after the work is in a private collection in Milan.

It was recorded in the collection of Johannes, Count of Fugger-Oberkirchberg at Schloss Oberkirchberg in Ulm. It was sold by Walter Schnackenberg on 10 December 1926 to the art dealer Franz Kleinberger and Co., who sold it on to Count Alessandro Contini-Bonacossi for $40,000 on 17 May 1928. It passed to his heirs and finally passed from Lorenzo Papi of Florence to its present owner in 1969.

== See also ==
- List of works by Giovanni Bellini
