= Andreas Fugger =

German businessman (1394–1457)

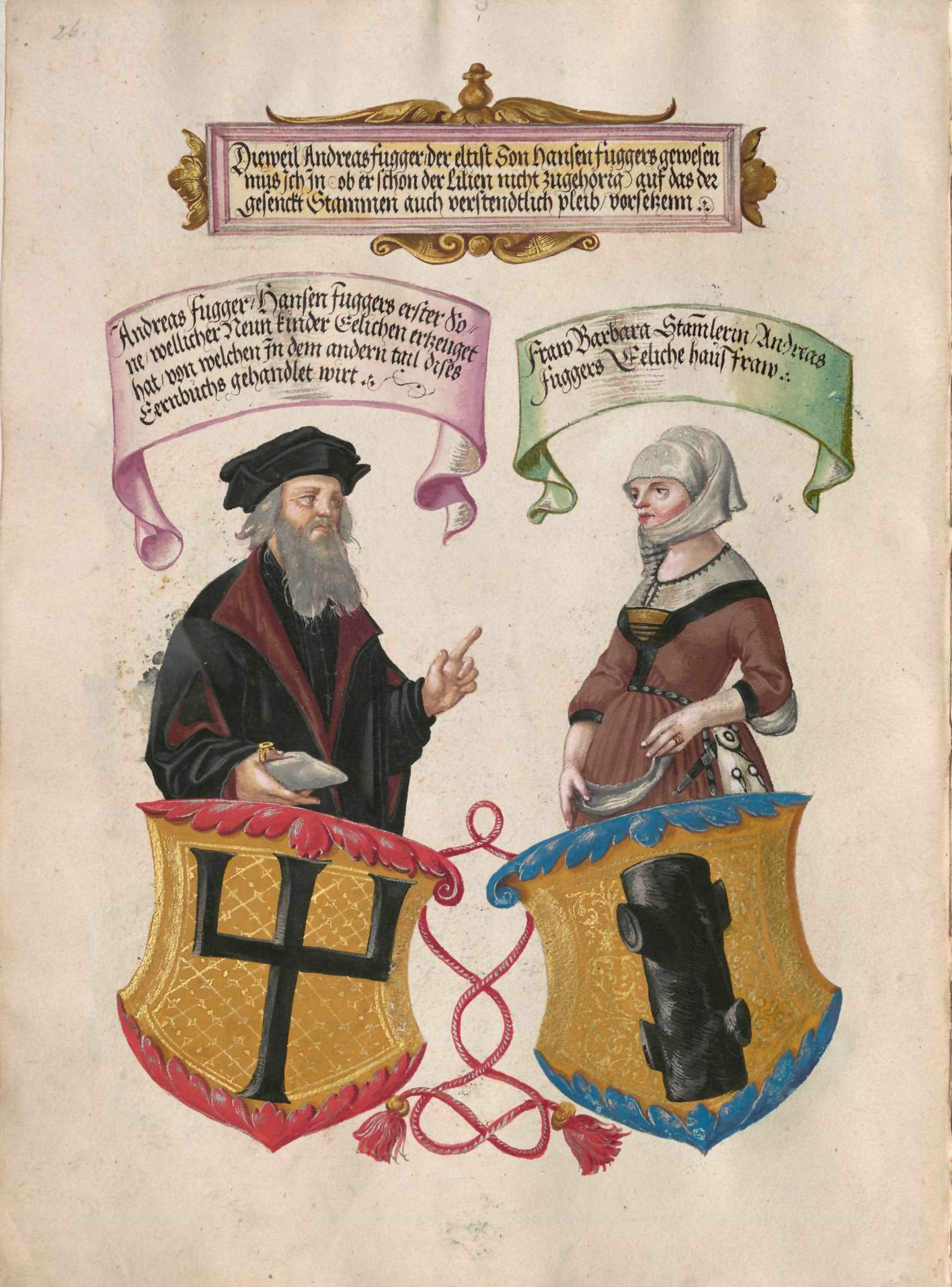
Andreas Fugger

Andreas Fugger (1394, Augsburg – 1457, Augsburg), known as "der Reiche", was a German businessman. He was the oldest son of Hans Fugger and Elisabeth Gfattermann, making him the elder brother of Jakob Fugger the Elder. He was the founder of the Fugger vom Reh branch of the Fugger family. His wife was Barbara Stammler vom Ast (1415/20–1476), a daughter of a rich salesman from Augsburg. Andreas was a very successful and able businessman, so he was called "Andreas der Reiche". He was the first member of the Fugger family who became a businessman. All the other family members were craftsmen at this time. Andreas Fugger and his wife had four sons, Jakob (c. 1430–1505), Lukas the Elder (1439–1512), Matthäus (1442–1489/92) and Hans the Elder (1443–1501). They were the founders of the four main lines of the "Fugger vom Reh".
