= Duttenstein Castle =

Castle in Germany

Coordinates: 48°41′21″N 10°27′42″E

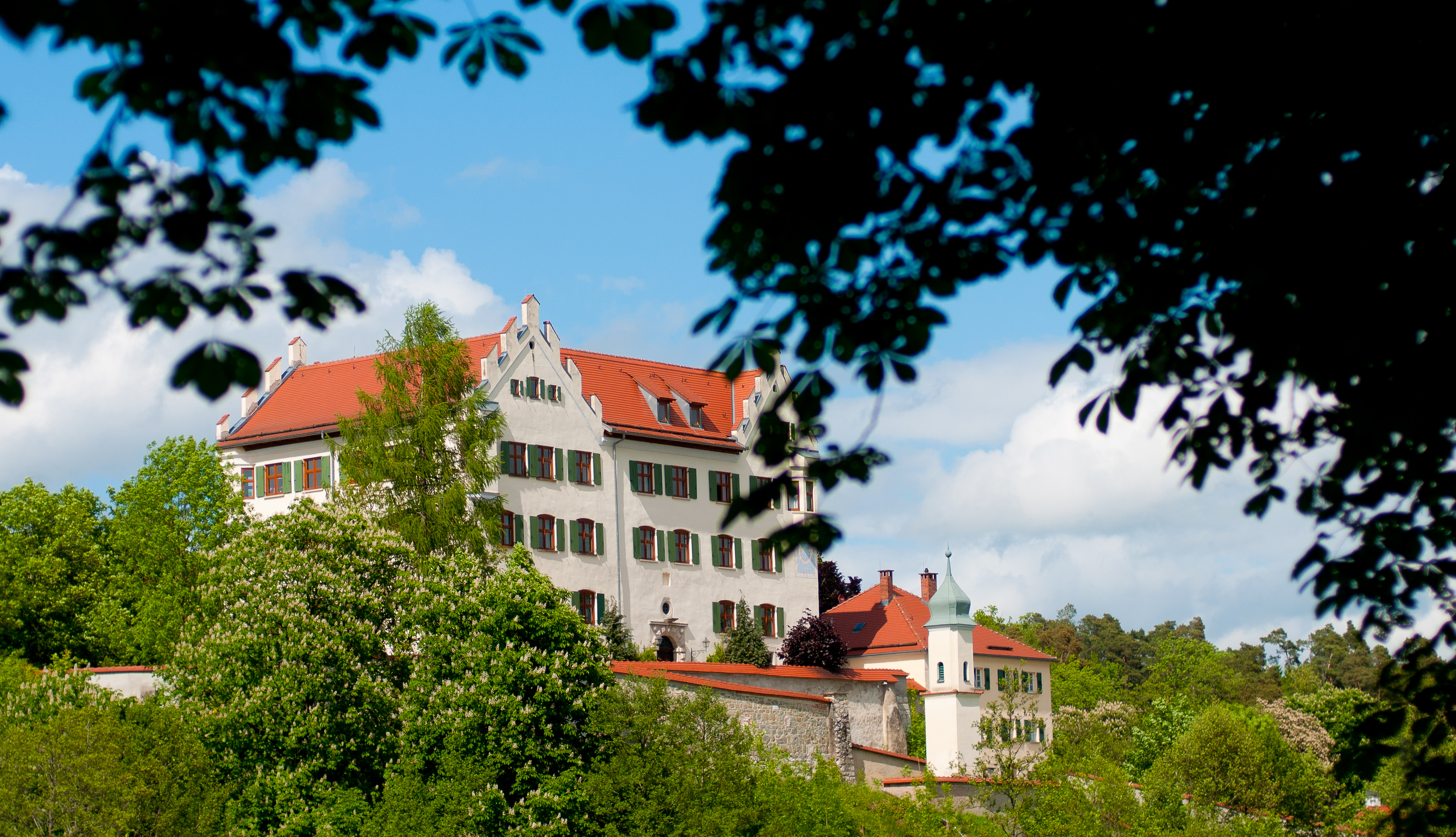
Schloss Duttenstein.

Schloss Duttenstein is a Renaissance hunting castle (German: Jagdschloss) located near the village of Demmingen, which is part of the town of Dischingen in Baden-Württemberg in Germany.

The first castle on this site was built between 1200 and 1374, perhaps for the Graf von Oettingen. The Renaissance style castle was built between 1564 and 1572 for the Fugger family. It passed through several owners before the Princely House of Thurn and Taxis acquired the castle. In 1817, Karl Alexander, 5th Prince of Thurn and Taxis donated 504 hectares for a nature park. The nature park is today home to deer, wild pigs and about 50 other species. The park is open to the public during daylight hours, but the castle is owned by Bernd Schottdorf, a physician who operates medical laboratories.

== See also ==
- List of castles in Baden-Württemberg
