= Anton Fugger =

German merchant (1493–1560)

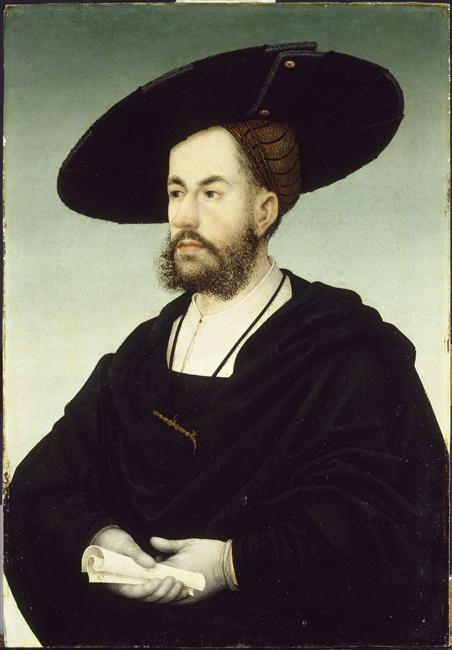
- Portrait by Hans Maler
- Born: 10 June 1493; Augsburg, Holy Roman Empire
- Died: 14 September 1560 (aged 67); Augsburg, Holy Roman Empire
- Spouse: Anna Rehlinger (m. 1527)
- Relatives: Jakob Fugger (uncle)

Anton Fugger (10 June 1493 – 14 September 1560) was a German merchant, banker, and member of the Fugger family. He was a nephew of Jakob Fugger.

== Biography ==
Anton was the third and youngest son of George Fugger and Regina Imhof. He was born in Augsburg on 10 June 1493. At his death on 30 December 1525, Jakob Fugger bequeathed to his nephew Anton Fugger company assets totaling 2,032,652 guilders. He ran his uncle's business along with his brother Raymund and his cousin Hieronymus Fugger. As a result, he expanded trade to Buenos Aires, Mexico and the West Indies. He supported the Emperor Ferdinand I and Charles V. He was regarded as the "Prince of Merchants". His greatest achievement was to set the course for the future of the Fugger family. He prepared the next generation of the family through arranged marriages of his sons and daughters with the nobility.

== Marriage and children ==
In 1527, he married Anna Rehlinger. They had four sons and six daughters.
