= Jakob Fugger =

German merchant, mining entrepreneur and banker (1459–1525)

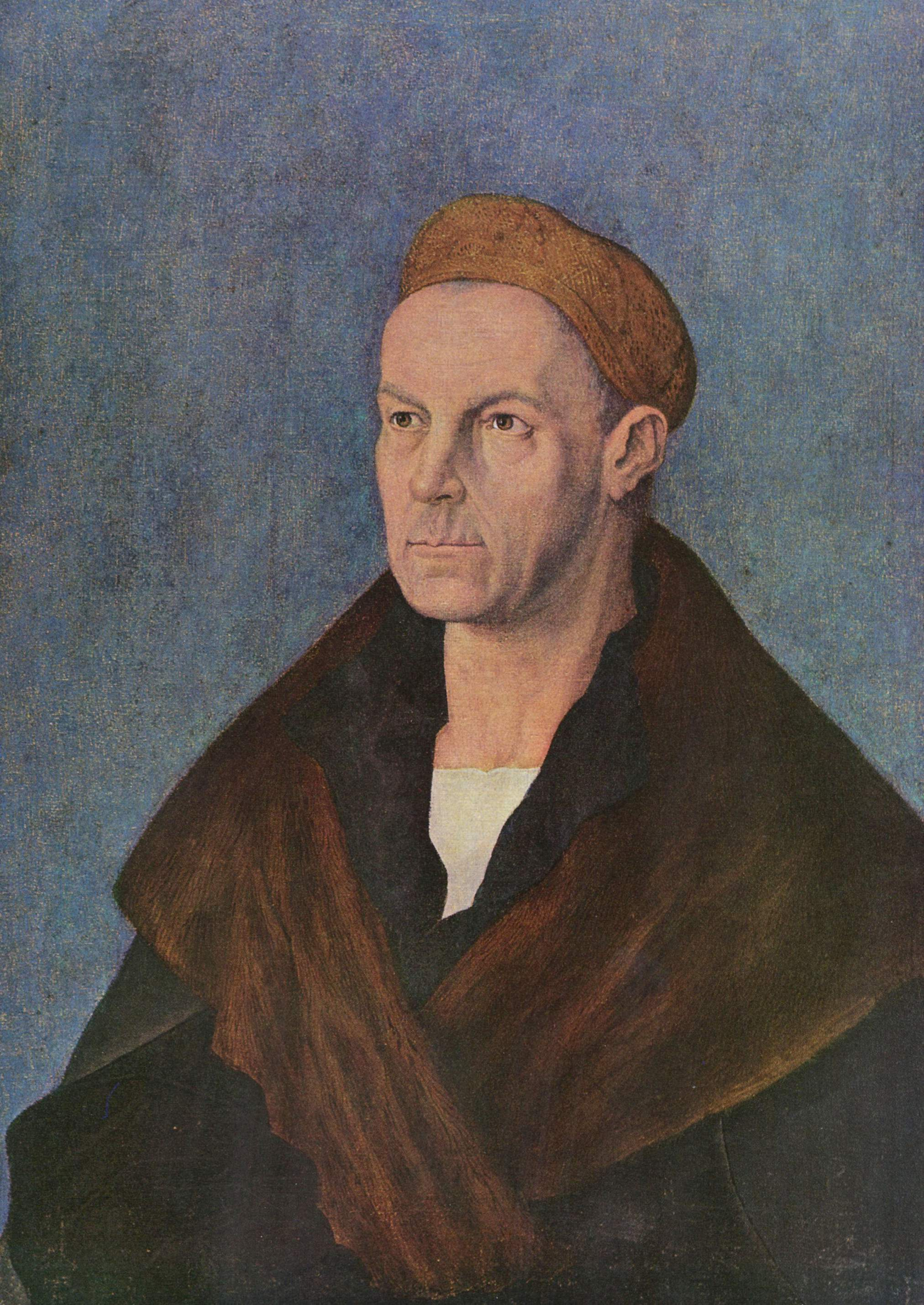
- Portrait of Jakob Fugger by Albrecht Dürer, 1518 (Staatsgalerie Altdeutsche Meister), Augsburg
- Born: 6 March 1459; Augsburg, Holy Roman Empire
- Died: 30 December 1525 (aged 66); Augsburg, Holy Roman Empire
- Resting place: St. Anna's Church
- Spouse: Sybilla Artzt (m. 1498)
- Parents: Jakob Fugger the Elder (father); Barbara Bäsinger (mother)
- Relatives: Anton Fugger (nephew)

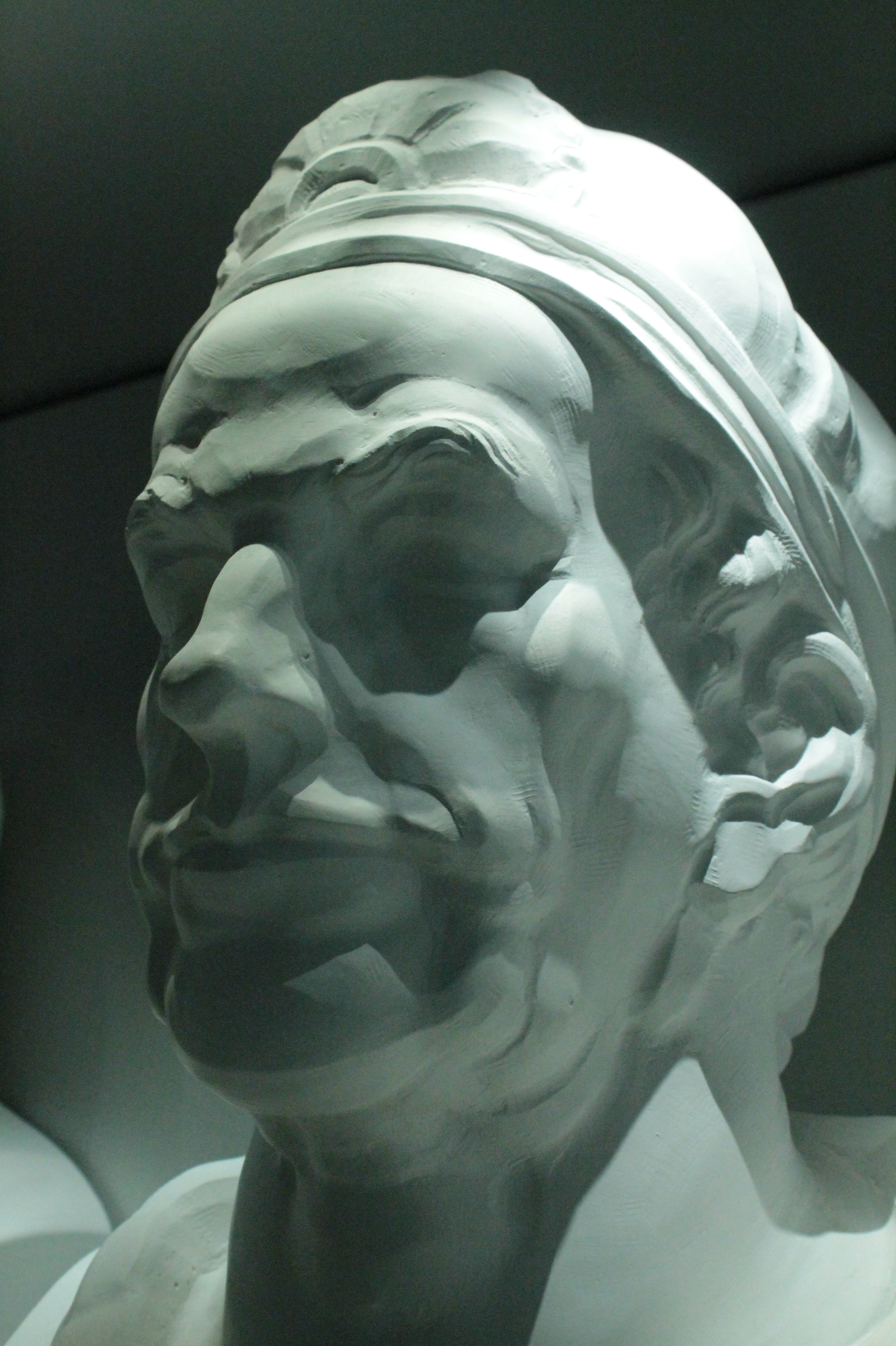
Jakob Fugger, in Bundeswehr Military History Museum, Dresden

Jakob Fugger of the Lily (German: Jakob Fugger von der Lilie; 6 March 1459 – 30 December 1525), also known as Jakob Fugger the Rich or Jakob II, was a major German merchant, mining entrepreneur, and banker. He was a descendant of the Fugger merchant family located in the Free Imperial City of Augsburg. He was born there and later was elevated through marriage to Grand Burgher of Augsburg (Großbürger zu Augsburg). Within a few decades, he expanded the family firm to a business operating in all of Europe. He began his education at the age of 14 in Venice, which also remained his main residence until 1487. At the same time, he was a cleric and held several prebends. American journalist Greg Steinmetz has estimated his overall wealth to be around 2% of the GDP of Europe at that time, the equivalent of around $400 billion adjusted to 2015. (Note: In 2019, 2% of Europe's GDP would have been US$303 billion.)

The foundation of the family's wealth was created mainly by the textile trade with Italy. The company grew rapidly after the brothers Ulrich, Georg and Jakob began banking transactions with the House of Habsburg as well as the Roman Curia, and at the same time began mining operations in Tyrol, and from 1493 on the extraction of silver, and copper in the kingdoms of Bohemia and Hungary. As of 1525, they also had the right to mine quicksilver and cinnabar in Almadén.

After 1487, Jakob Fugger was the de facto head of the Fugger business operations which soon had an almost monopolistic hold on the European copper market. Copper from Hungary was transported through Antwerp to Lisbon, and from there shipped to India. Jakob Fugger also contributed to the first and only trade expedition to India that German merchants cooperated in, a Portuguese fleet to the Indian west coast (1505–1506), as well as a failed 1525 Spanish trade expedition to the Maluku Islands.

With his support of the Habsburg dynasty as a banker, he had a decisive influence on European politics at the time. He financed the rise of Maximilian I and made considerable contributions to secure the election of the Spanish king Charles I to become Holy Roman Emperor Charles V. Jakob Fugger also funded the marriages which later resulted in the House of Habsburg gaining the kingdoms of Bohemia and Hungary.

Jakob Fugger secured his legacy and lasting fame through his foundations in Augsburg. A chapel funded by him and built from 1509 to 1512 is Germany's first renaissance building and contains the tombs of the brothers Ulrich, Georg and Jakob. The Fuggerei, which was founded by Jakob in 1521, is the world's oldest social housing complex still in use. The Damenhof, part of the Fuggerhäuser in Augsburg, is the first secular renaissance building in Germany and was built in 1515.

At his death on 30 December 1525, Jakob Fugger bequeathed to his nephew Anton Fugger company assets totaling 2,032,652 guilders. He is among the most well-known Germans and arguably the most famous citizen of Augsburg, with his wealth earning him the moniker "Fugger the Rich". In 1967 a bust of him was placed in the Walhalla, a "hall of fame" near Regensburg that honors laudable and distinguished Germans.

== Life ==
=== Background, education and early years in Venice ===
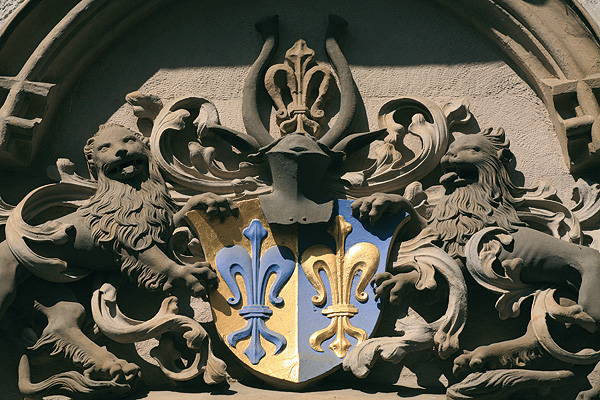
Coat of arms of the Fugger of the lily family, granted in 1473

Jakob Fugger was born the tenth of eleven children to Jakob Fugger the Elder (1398–1469) and his wife Barbara Bäsinger (1419–1497), daughter of Münzmeister Franz Bäsinger. The Fugger family had already established themselves as successful merchants in the city. Hans Fugger, grandfather of Jakob Fugger, had taken up residence in Augsburg in 1367, became a burgher through marriage and acquired considerable wealth by trading textiles with Italy. A few years before his death his son Jakob Fugger the Elder was already one of the richest citizens of Augsburg.

Jakob's older brothers Ulrich (1441–1510) and Georg (1453–1506) created the basis for the rise of the company in Europe. Around 1470 they founded manufactories in Venice and Nuremberg, then important centers of trade. Jakob Fugger's brothers Andreas and Hans both died young in Venice. His brother Markus was a cleric and from 1470 on a writer in a papal chancery in Rome where he died in 1478. His brother Peter died in an epidemic in Nuremberg in 1473.

Loans given to Emperor Frederick III and supplies given to his entourage by Ulrich Fugger were the reason for the family being granted the lily coat of arms in 1473. The "of the lily" (German: von der Lilie) naming after this coat of arms distinguishes this line of the Fugger family from the "of the doe" (German: vom Reh) branch.

Until 2009 historians assumed that Jakob Fugger, who was a minor order at the age of 12, had lived as a canon in a church located in Herrieden. A document from the Austrian state archive has now shown that Jakob Fugger was already representing his family business in Venice in 1473 at the age of 14. Other research showed that Jakob Fugger spent the years between 1473 and 1487 mostly at the Fondaco dei Tedeschi, the house of German merchants in Venice. Venice being one of the most important centers of trade at the time proved to be an ideal environment for Jakob Fugger's education in banking and the metal trade. His long residence in Italy also helped bring the renaissance style to the German region, with his funding the construction of the first buildings of this style that originated in Italy. Legal and architectural structures of Venice also had a significant influence on the funding of the Fuggerei which was similar to the social housing of Venice.

=== Beginnings of the mining and metal trade ===
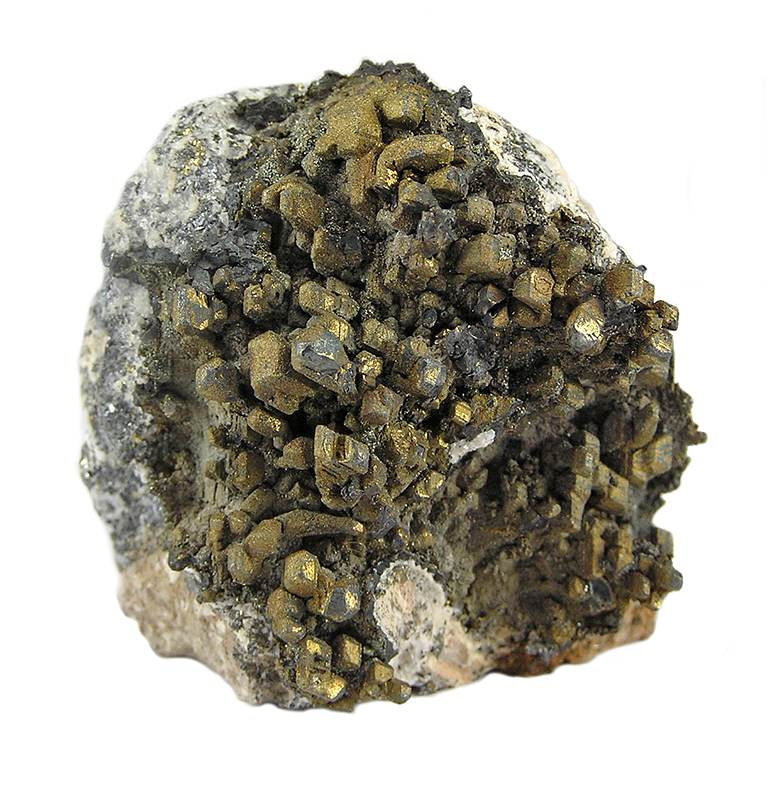
Rich silver ore (argentite) from Banská Štiavnica mines

Jakob Fugger laid the foundation of his mining business in Salzburg. He provided loans to the independent silver mine owners in the Salzburg Slate Alps which had constant need for new capital. Instead of receiving the usual documents acknowledging debt, he demanded "Kuxe", which essentially made him a shareholder in the mines. Through this he forced more and more mine operators in the area of Gastein and Schladming to sell their silver directly to the Fugger family instead of intermediary traders.

Jakob Fugger was responsible for his family's business in Augsburg, Tyrol, Venice and Rome. Around 1485 the family also founded manufactories in Innsbruck (since 1510 in Hall, since 1539 in Schwaz). Through a small loan he there first came into contact with Archduke Sigismund, a member of the Habsburg family. The archduke had as the sole owner of the Tyrol property rights handed out permissions for mining operations to private investors which in return had to pay a share of their profits to Sigismund. Despite this income he was constantly short of money owing to a lavish lifestyle, several illegitimate children and his extensive construction projects. A responsibility to pay the amount of 100,000 guilders of war reparations to Venice was eventually financed by Jakob Fugger. In 1488 the total debt already amounted to more than 150,000 guilders. Notable was the form of payment: Instead of paying the Fürst directly the Fugger family paid the money to his creditors as well as providing the wages for the royal court and craftsmen. Fugger met an engineer by the name of Jan Thurzo, and they formed a powerful copper company in the neighbouring town of Banská Bystrica in 1495. In 1517 the Fugger family financed more than half of Tyrol's public budget. As a result, they were at times entitled to all the silver and copper out of Tyrol.

=== Relationship with Maximilian I ===
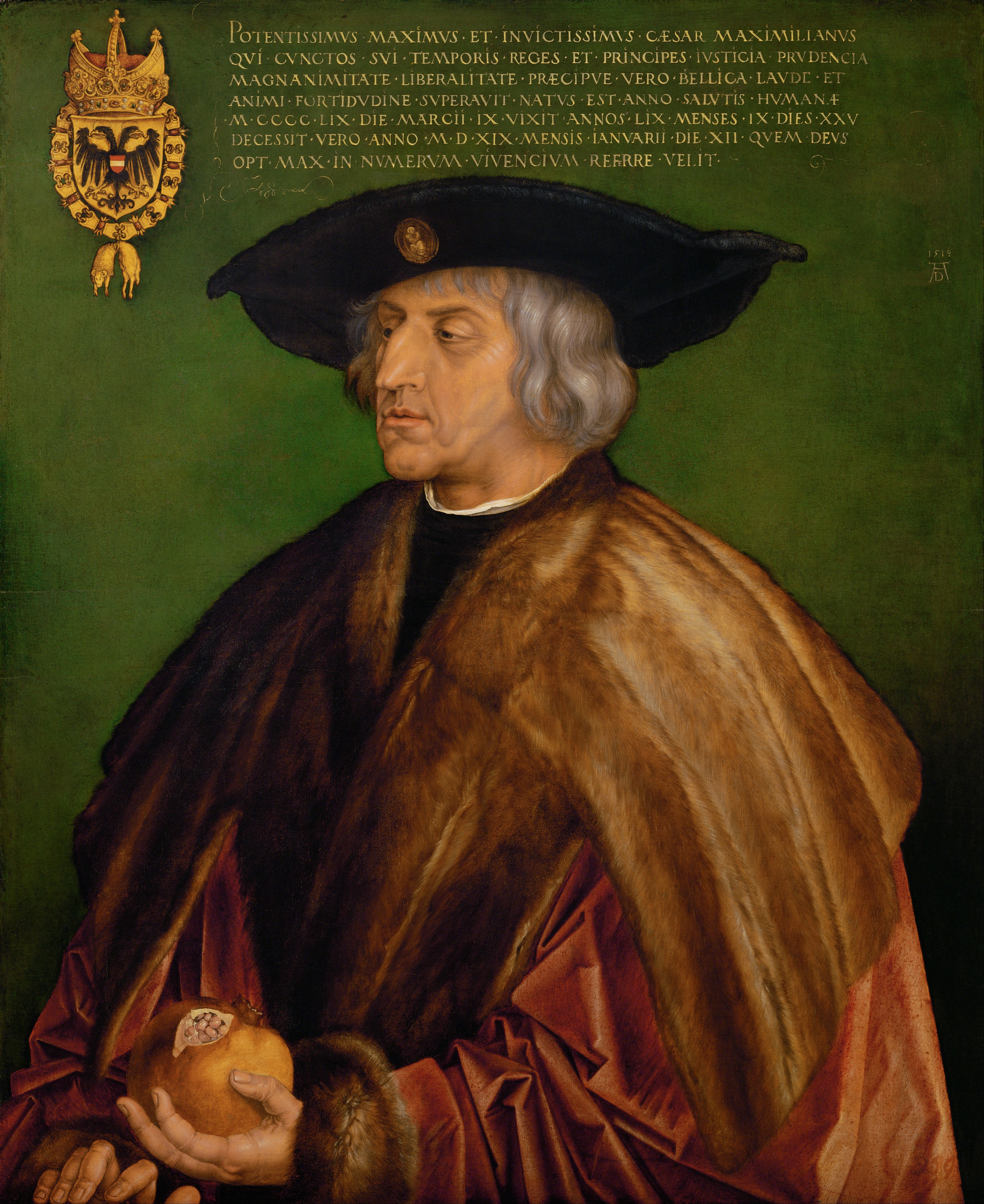
Emperor Maximilian I., Albrecht Dürer (1519)

The expansion of high-risk, albeit very lucrative, business connections to Maximilian I was undoubtedly promoted by Fugger. In his view, the House of Habsburg was bound to be the dominant power and dynasty within the German region, and as such should receive his financial and political support. Jakob Fugger met the young Roman-German king for the first time in 1489 at a Frankfurt fair. At that time, his plans for the independent Duchy of Tyrol had been agreed upon with the king's chancellor, Johann Waldner. On 16 March 1490 Sigismund and the Tyrol Estates came together with King Maximilian also present. The archduke had to resign under the pressure from the estates, who accused him of mismanagement, and his possessions fell to the king. Maximilian then promised to repay all loans of its predecessor to Jakob Fugger.

Thus the Fugger business became one of the most important financial backers of Maximilian, who since 1486 was co-regent of the Holy Roman Empire. After his father Frederick III died in 1493 he became the reigning emperor. Despite having constant financial difficulties due to an extravagant lifestyle and many failed political projects his reign saw the kingdoms of Spain, Bohemia and Hungary gained for the House of Habsburg, not by waging war but through advantageous marriage arrangements which were funded with the help of Jakob Fugger.

On 15 July 1507 Maximilian I sold the County of Kirchberg, located at Ulm, the adjacent lordship Weißenhorn with the associated city, as well as the lordships Wullenstetten and Pfaffenhofen (Roth) from the Habsburg possessions in Further Austria to Jakob Fugger. Maximilian I who crowned himself Holy Roman Emperor in 1508 received a payment of 50,000 guilders for these sales. More sales followed in 1508 where he sold manor Schmiechen and in 1514 where he sold the lordship Biberbach to Fugger. Maximilian I elevated Jakob Fugger into nobility in 1511 and granted him the title of Imperial Count in 1514 so the former burgher could operate his business without interference from local nobility. In the course of his life Jakob Fugger also became lord of more than 50 smaller villages.

Criticism from reformer Martin Luther on the Fugger business methods and novelistic portrayal from early research have led to the notion that Jakob Fugger exercised considerable power over Maximilian I the king and emperor of the Holy Roman Empire, while more recent research shows that this was only partially true. However, close to the end of his life Maximilian was so heavily indebted to Jakob Fugger that he had no choice but to continue his support for the Emperor to still be able reclaim his outstanding debits. When Maximilian's grandson Charles V stood for election to become the next Emperor, Jakob Fugger raised a sum of more than 500,000 guilders, a significant portion of his wealth and of the total amount raised in his support, to ensure the seven prince-electors would choose him. Thereby he helped prevent the election of Francis I of France which would have endangered his claims and investments gravely, although it also made him highly dependent on the House of Habsburg.

Much later the Fugger family lost a large portion of their wealth following three Spanish state bankruptcies (1557, 1560 and 1575) under the reign of Philip II of Spain.

=== Mining and metal trade ===
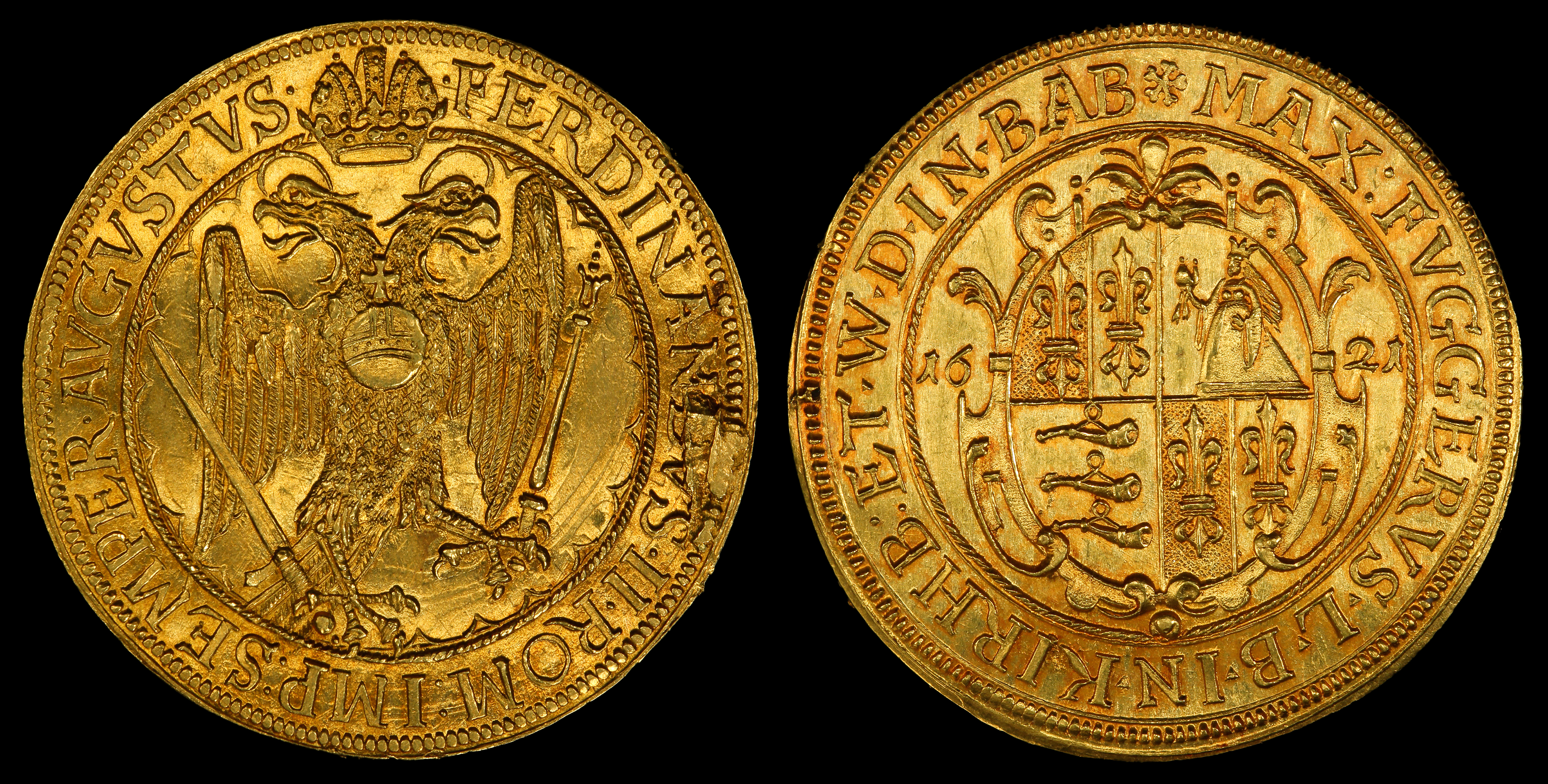
10 ducats (1621), minted as circulating currency by the Fugger family

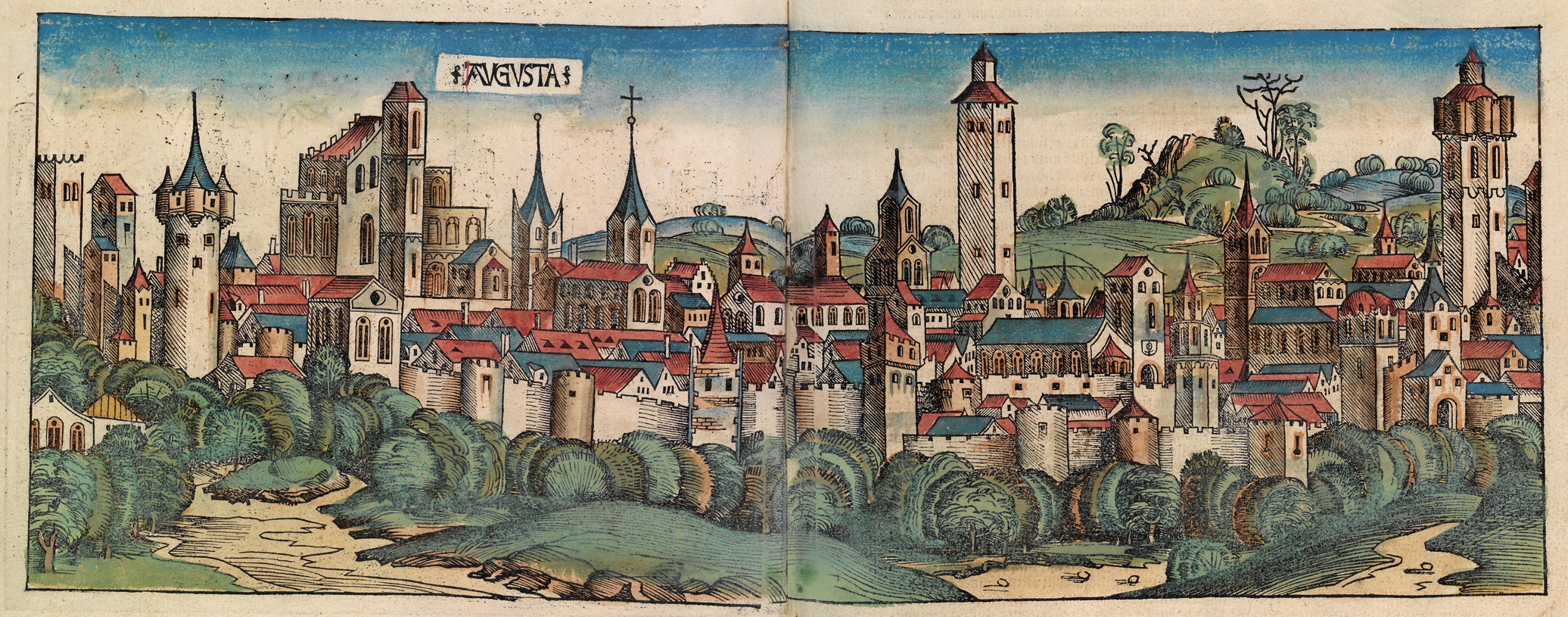
Augsburg, Nuremberg Chronicle (1493)

Likely at the insistence of Jakob Fugger the company became one of the first open trading companies (German: "der compagnia palese des welschen Rechts") in Europe in 1494. At the same time, it was renamed into "Ulrich Fugger of Augsburg and brothers" to show the equality of the three brothers involved in business issues, even though Tyrolean sources almost universally speak of the Jakob Fugger company and central contracts of the Hungarian trade were all signed by him. At this development the greatly increased influence of Jakob within the company can be observed. During the late 1480s Jakob Fugger dominated the company's policies, although the eldest brother Ulrich still formally led the company.

The enormous growth potential in the mining and ore trade was very profitably harnessed by Jakob Fugger in the following years. As collateral for loans that he had given to the Habsburgs and the King of Hungary, he demanded mine revenues of Tyrol and the transfer of mining rights in Upper Hungary to him. Through this method he eventually established a dominant and almost monopolistic hold on the copper trade in Central Europe. With his business partner Hans Thurzó he founded the Hungarian trade in 1494. Mines funded by Fugger were constructed in Neusohl (present-day Banská Bystrica, Slovakia), at the time part of the Hungarian Kingdom. The expansion continued with the construction of smelting plants in Neusohl and nearby Moschnitz, Arnoldstein in Carinthia, Hohenkirchen in Thuringia. The copper was distributed through manufactories in Breslau, Leipzig, Kraków and Ofen. For transportation to the ports of Danzig, Stettin and Lübeck on the Baltic Sea Fugger funded the construction of a new road across the Jablunkov Pass. From those ports the copper was shipped to the Russian region and additionally through Antwerp to Lisbon where it was an important Portuguese trade good destined for the export to India. Part of the copper was also transported through Wiener Neustadt and the Adriatic ports Triest and Zengg to the copper market in Venice. At the time mines from both Tyrol and Hungary provided the bulk of the total European production in copper which provided an incredibly advantageous position in the European market, albeit not a total monopoly.

=== The Vatican as a client ===
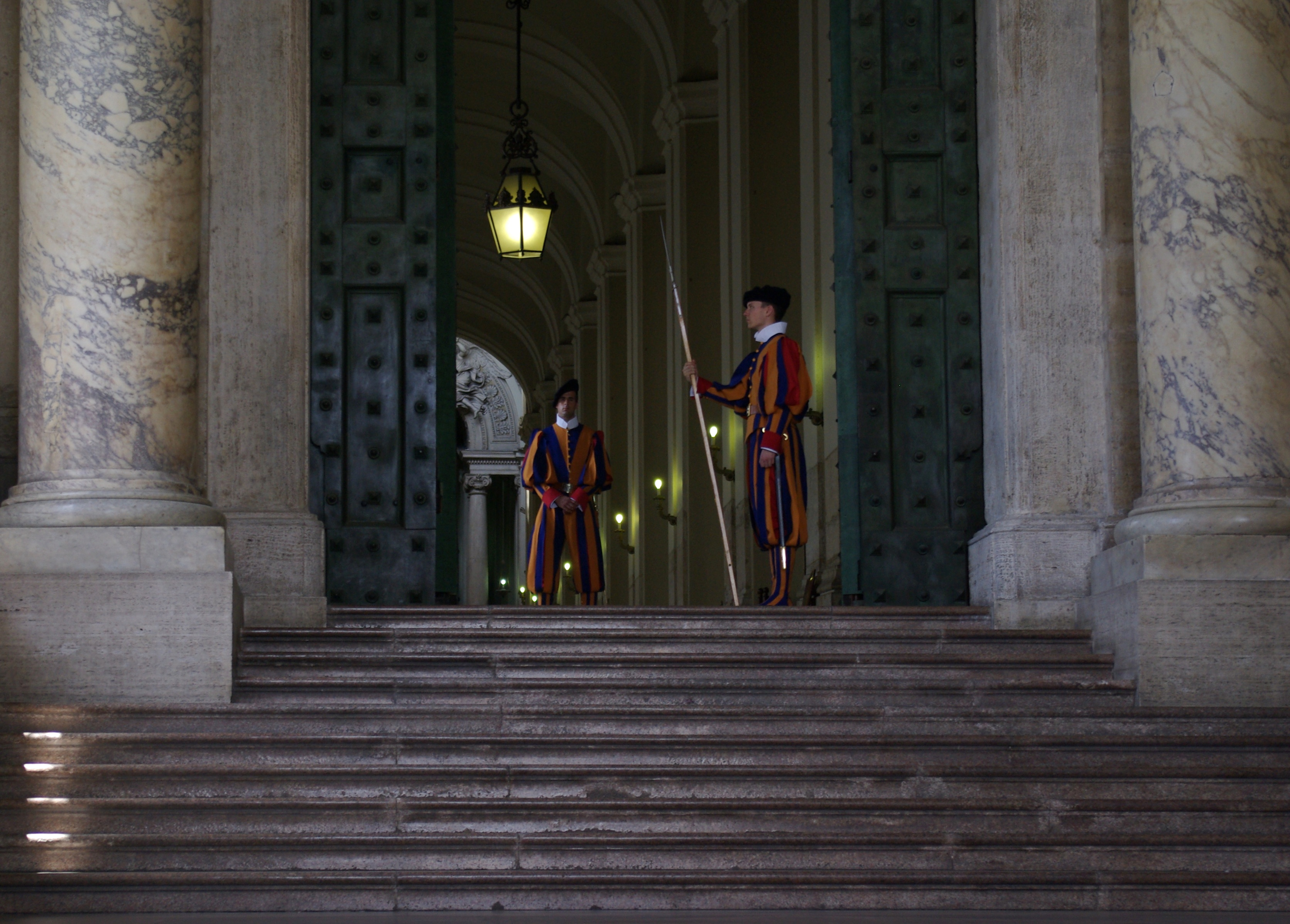
Swiss Guard, 2009

The Fugger family were the first German trading house in a direct business relationship with the Roman Curia. In the year 1500, Jakob Fugger loaned the Vatican the money necessary to build the new St. Peter's Basilica, the Sistine Chapel, as well as other buildings within the Vatican. To repay Jakob the massive amount of money owed, Pope Leo X had to heavily tax the German people as well as sell indulgences, which was heavily unpopular with a large group of monks, including Martin Luther. Partly because of the corruption within the church, Martin Luther was prompted to write his Ninety-five Theses. Following the death of Pope Alexander VI in August 1503 Jakob Fugger intensified his contacts to the Vatican in Rome. For the new Pope Julius II Fugger financed the recruitment in 1505/1506 of the Swiss Guard, which still exists today. Early dealings in Rome are attributed to the cleric Markus Fugger in 1473. In 1477 the Fugger business was responsible for transferring church revenues from Sweden to Rome. Between 1507 and 1524, the company leased the Roman mint, the Zecca, manufacturing 66 types of coins for four different popes. After this the Fugger family was represented by only one manufactory in Rome, mostly due to the 1527 Sack of Rome and the less German-friendly Medici pope Clement VII.

=== Overseas trade ===
The commodity trade played a relatively small role compared to the two main branches of the Fugger business, banking and mining. It is only because of the associated exotic investments that Jakob Fugger's early trading expeditions take a prominent place in the history of the Fugger business.

After Vasco da Gama's discovery of the sea route to India and the establishment of the Portuguese spice monopoly, Jakob Fugger took part in the spice trade and in 1503 opened a manufactory in Lisbon. He received permission to trade pepper, other spices, and luxury goods such as pearls and gemstones through Lisbon. Along with other merchant houses of Germany and Italy he contributed to a fleet of 22 Portuguese ships led by Francisco de Almeida that sailed to India in the year 1505 and returned in 1506. Even though one third of the imported wares had to be ceded to the King of Portugal the operation was still profitable. Soon afterwards the King declared the spice trade a monopoly of the crown in order to secure his income and exclude foreign merchants from participating. However, the Portuguese were still largely dependent on the copper delivered by Fugger which was an essential export good for the trade with India.

Unlike the Welser family, Jakob Fugger's participation in the overseas trade was very cautious and conservative, and the only other operation of this kind he invested in was a failed 1525 trade expedition to the Maluku Islands led by the Spaniard Garcia de Loaisa. There is some evidence that he financed Magellan's famed voyage.

=== The great crisis of Jakob Fugger ===
Especially for mining projects in upper Hungary the Fugger company required enormous capital, which at the time it could not raise. Hence Cardinal Melchior von Meckau was the main sponsor of the Fugger business in 1496. The Prince-Bishop had secretly and unknown to his church chapter invested 150,000 guilders in the Fugger company in return for interest, thereby evading the official church ban on interest. When he died in Rome in 1509 this investment was uncovered. The Pope, the bishopric Brixen and the family of Meckau all claiming the inheritance now demanded the immediate payback of these assets which would have resulted in insolvency for Jakob Fugger. It was this situation that prompted Emperor Maximilian I to step in and assist his banker. On the condition of assisting Pope Julius II in a war against the Republic of Venice the Habsburg monarch was recognized as being the rightful heir of Cardinal Melchior von Meckau. The inheritance could now be settled by amortizing outstanding debts. Fugger also had to deliver jewels as compensation to the Pope. However, in return for his support, Maximilian I demanded the continuous financial support of his ongoing military and political campaigns.

Since the death of his brothers Georg in 1506 and Ulrich in 1510, Jakob Fugger was now running the Fugger business as the sole policy and decision maker. The company was renamed into "Jakob Fugger und Gebrüder Söhne" (Jakob Fugger and Brother's Sons). In the following years up until his death Jakob Fugger managed to raise the family fortune which amounted to about 200,000 guilders in 1511 to more than two million guilders, perhaps 2% of Europe's GDP.

=== Election of Charles V in 1519 ===
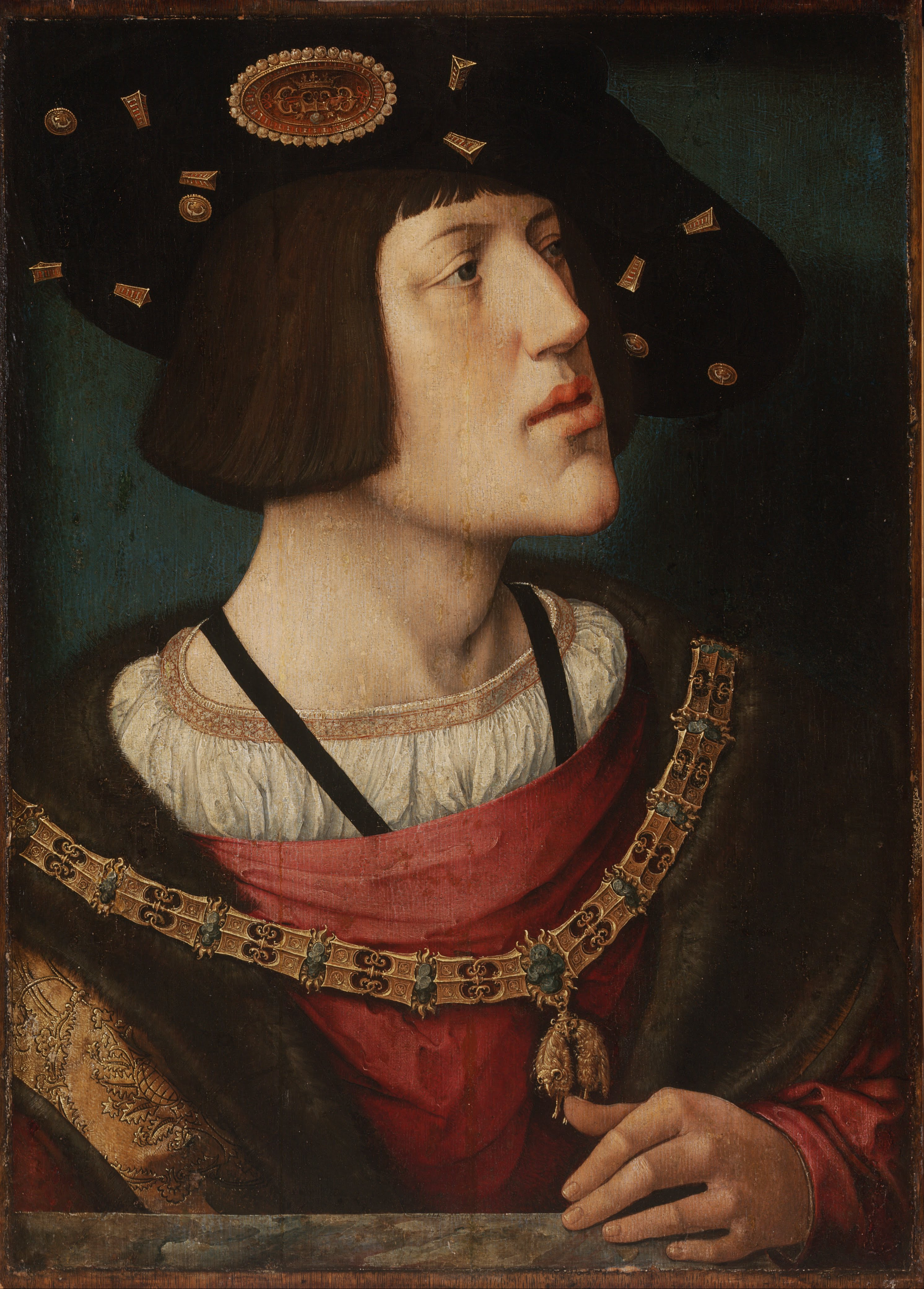
Portrait of Charles V, Bernard van Orley (1519 to 1520)

Emperor Maximilian died in January 1519 and bequeathed to his grandson Charles the hereditary lands of House Habsburg with adjoining Burgundian lands as well as a disputed claim to the throne of the Holy Roman Empire. To secure his essential investments into House Habsburg Jakob Fugger decided to support the election of the 19-year-old claimant to the throne. In addition to Charles, the English king Henry VIII, the French king Francis I and Frederick III, Elector of Saxony announced their candidacy. Francis I had already secured the votes of the Archdiocese of Trier and the Electorate of the Palatinate as well as offering a sum of 300,000 guilders of election money. The prince-electors consisted of the three archbishops of Mainz, Cologne and Trier in addition to the King of Bohemia, the Elector of the Palatinate, the Margrave of Brandenburg and the Duke of Saxony.

This was a difficult situation for Charles who now relied on the riches of Jakob Fugger to sway the election in his favor. Fugger transferred the enormous sum of more than 850,000 guilders to the prince-electors which ultimately resulted in the unanimous election of Charles Holy Roman Emperor on 28 July 1519. Out of this 850,000 guilders Fugger himself funded around 550,000 while another merchant house of Augsburg, the Welser family, contributed about 150,000 and three Italian bankers providing the rest. What today would be seen as bribery was common practice in the election of the Emperor. Exceptional however were the immense sums involved, mainly due to the keen competition among the princely candidates.

A few days later the Pope granted Charles the right to name himself Elected Emperor. It was only in 1530 that Charles V was crowned Emperor by the Pope in Bologna. He was the last Emperor to receive a papal coronation. Charles V, since his election reigning over a realm where the sun never set, was now deeply indebted to Jakob Fugger. In 1521 the debts amounted to more than 600,000 guilders. The Emperor amortized 415,000 of this sum and in return granted the Fugger company the silver and copper mining operations of Tyrol. During the Imperial Diet of 1523 in Nuremberg it was debated whether to restrict trade capital and the number of trade establishments companies were allowed to maintain. Jakob Fugger intervened and reminded the Emperor that "It is known that your imperial majesty could not have claimed the Roman crown without my help,..." (German: „Es ist auch wissentlich und liegt am Tage, dass Eure Kaiserliche Majestät die römische Krone ohne mein Zutun nicht hätte erlangen können,…") The added demand of repayment of all debts eventually led to all discussions of trade restrictions and limits to monopolies being dropped. In addition to this Jakob Fugger was granted a concession to mine quicksilver and cinnabar in Almadén. The Fugger company was involved in the Spanish mining business up to the year 1645.

== Marriage, heritage and successors ==
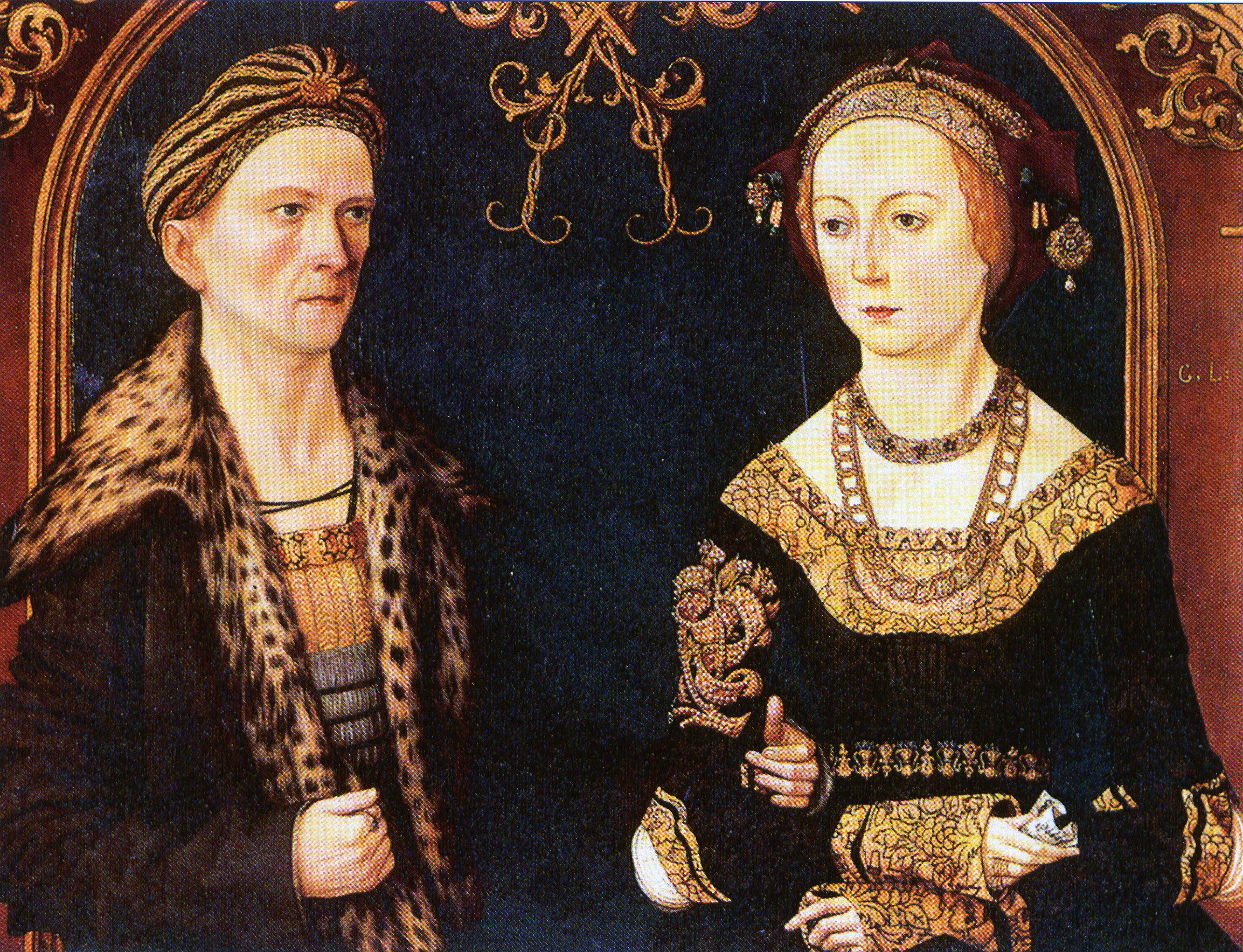
Portrait of Jakob Fugger and Sibylle Artzt, around 1500

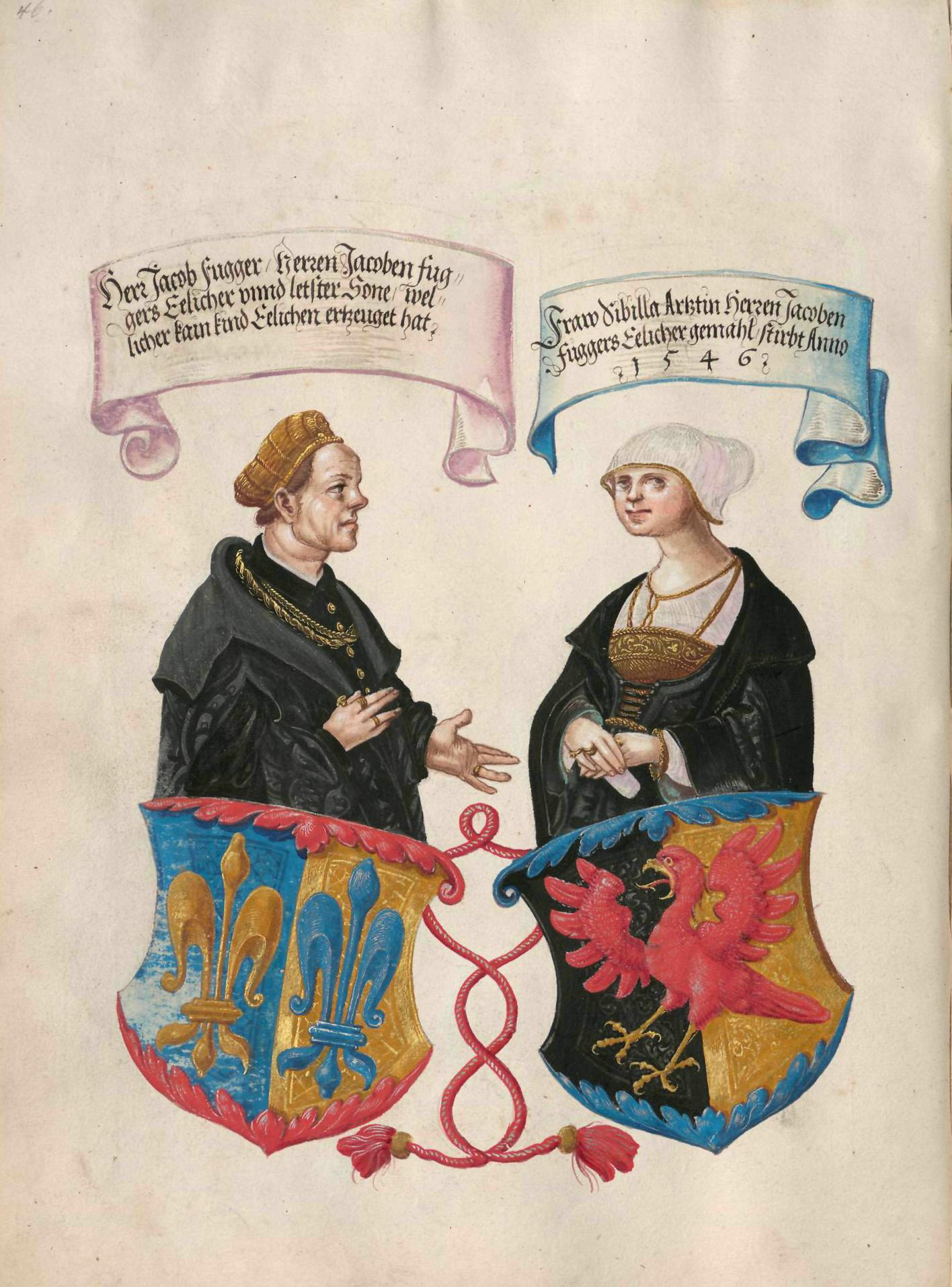
Jakob Fugger and Sybille Artzt, Miniature in the Ehrenbuch of the Fugger family, Augsburg, Workshop Jörg Breu der Jüngere, 1545–1549

In 1498 the 40-year-old Jakob Fugger married Sybille Arzt (also: Artzt) Grand Burgheress of Augsburg, the 18-year-old daughter of an eminent Augsburg Grand Burgher. This marriage opened the opportunity for Jakob to elevate to Grand Burgher of Augsburg (German Großbürger zu Augsburg) and later finally giving Jakob Fugger the long-awaited aspiration of a seat on the city council (German Stadtrat) of Augsburg. Four years after the wedding, Jakob Fugger bought for his young wife 40,000 guilders' worth of jewels from the treasure of Burgundy, among them the jewel known as the Three Brothers, which the Fuggers later sold to Edward VI to become part of the Crown Jewels of England. Jakob wanted to demonstrate that he was after all equal to the Habsburgs, at least financially. However, the jewels were left in a chest in the basement of his house for fear of theft and envy. The couple had no children. Seven weeks after her husband died, Sybille Arzt married a business partner of Jakob and converted to the Protestant faith.

Jakob Fugger died on 30 December 1525. The inventory performed by his heirs revealed assets totaling 3,000,058 guilders and liabilities amounting to 867,797 guilders resulting in a surplus of 2,132,261 guilders.

Because Fugger had no direct descendants, the company and its assets were bequeathed to his nephews Raymund and Anton Fugger, who also led the company. Anton managed to double the family's fortune once more by 1546.

== Religious views and Reformation ==
Jakob was a lifelong Roman Catholic. In 1513 he granted the Archbishop of Magdeburg and bishop of Halberstadt, Albert of Brandenburg, a loan of 20,000 guilders to persuade the Roman Curia to approve his additional election as Archbishop of Mainz, for this choice violated the canonical prohibition to hold more than one bishopric. Albert also did not meet the requirements for taking over a diocese, since the 24-year-old had not yet reached the appropriate age and did not have a university degree and therefore needed a study leave for which the curia charged a high "processing fee". In 1514 Albert suggested to Pope Leo X that a special indulgence be announced in his three dioceses as well as in his native diocese of Brandenburg and that half of the income should be used for the construction of the new St. Peter's Basilica and half for his repayments to Jakob Fugger. An according papal bull was issued on March 31, 1515. The indulgence was entrusted to Albert in 1517 for publication in Saxony and Brandenburg. It cost him an additional sum of ten thousand ducats, and Albert employed Johann Tetzel for the actual preaching of the indulgence. Later, Martin Luther, then professor of theology in Wittenberg, addressed a letter of protest to Albert concerning the conduct of Tetzel. Largely in reaction to Tetzel's actions, Luther wrote his famous Ninety-five Theses, which led to the Reformation. After the Diet of Augsburg in 1518, Luther had to answer for his theses in the Fugger House before Cardinal Thomas Cajetan, who had been commissioned by the Pope. When Luther refused to retract his theses, he had to flee the city at night.

The citizens of Augsburg now demanded the unhindered spread of the Evangelical faith, which brought Jakob Fugger, who preferred to remain Catholic and thus remain loyal to the Emperor, especially since he operated his mines in Habsburg lands and had very high outstanding debts with the Emperor, into contrast to the majority of his fellow citizens. The Fugger family largely financed the House of Habsburg, who would play a prominent role in the Counter-Reformation. Fugger insisted that only Catholic inhabitants should "find care and cure" in his Fuggerei. As the Reformation progressed, the complex found itself located in an increasingly Protestant city of Augsburg.

Only a few years after Jakob Fugger's death the Augsburg Confession by Philip Melanchthon was formulated at the Diet of Augsburg in 1530. The Confessio Augustana represents the confessional and founding document of the Lutheran Church. The descendants of Jakob Fugger have remained Catholic to this day.

== Foundations and buildings of Jakob Fugger ==
=== Fugger chapel in the Annakirche ===
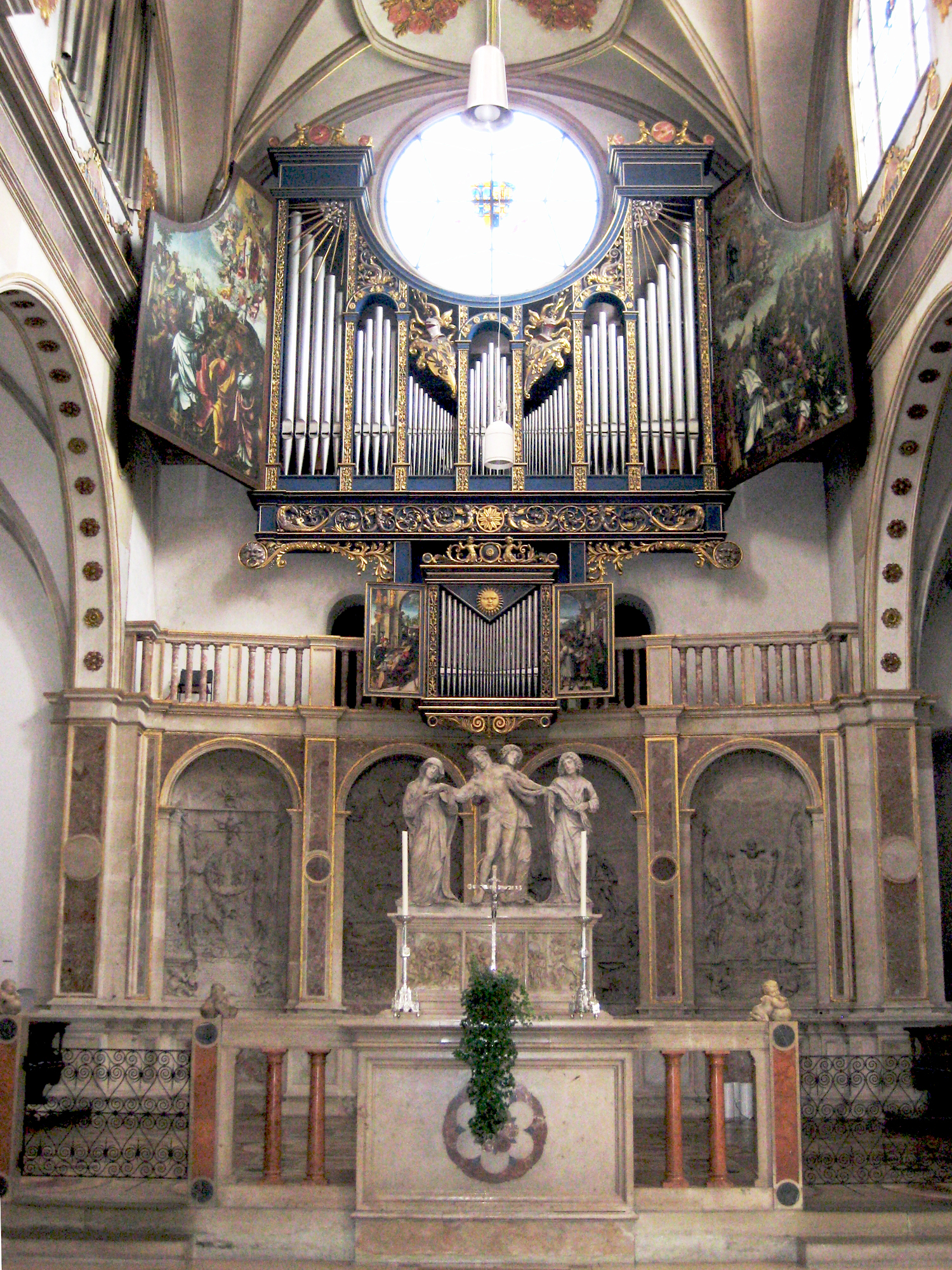
The Fugger chapel in the Annakirche, Augsburg, 2007

Together with his brother Ulrich and on behalf of his deceased brother Georg, Jakob Fugger founded the Fugger chapel in the Carmelite monastery's St. Anna church located in Augsburg. It became the burial place of the three brothers and the two nephews Raymund Fugger and Hieronymus Fugger (1499–1538).

Construction began in 1509 and was finished in 1512. The chapel was modeled after Italian burial chapels with clear influences out of Venice and Rome, thereby becoming Germany's first renaissance construction. The interior was designed with the help of many notable German artists of the time, such as Albrecht Dürer, Hans Burgkmair, Jörg Breu the Elder and Hans Daucher. The building is thought to have been built in preparation for Fugger's elevation into nobility and to distance himself from the local Patricians. Furthermore, it was a medium to preserve the name and memory of Fugger in the style of the Italian "Memoria" architecture.

In 1518 the chapel was consecrated to the patron saint of Jesus Christ in the altar sacrament, the Holy Virgin Mary and the Evangelist Matthew and has remained a consecrated Catholic place of worship to this day. When St. Anne's Church became Protestant in 1548, the Fugger Chapel remained Catholic because the Fugger Foundation continued to look after it and contributed to the upkeep of the church. This is how the remarkable fact came about that part of the church is denominationally different from the rest, and that the burial place of the Fugger family, who are considered strictly Catholic, is now in a Protestant church.

=== Fuggerhäuser in Augsburg ===
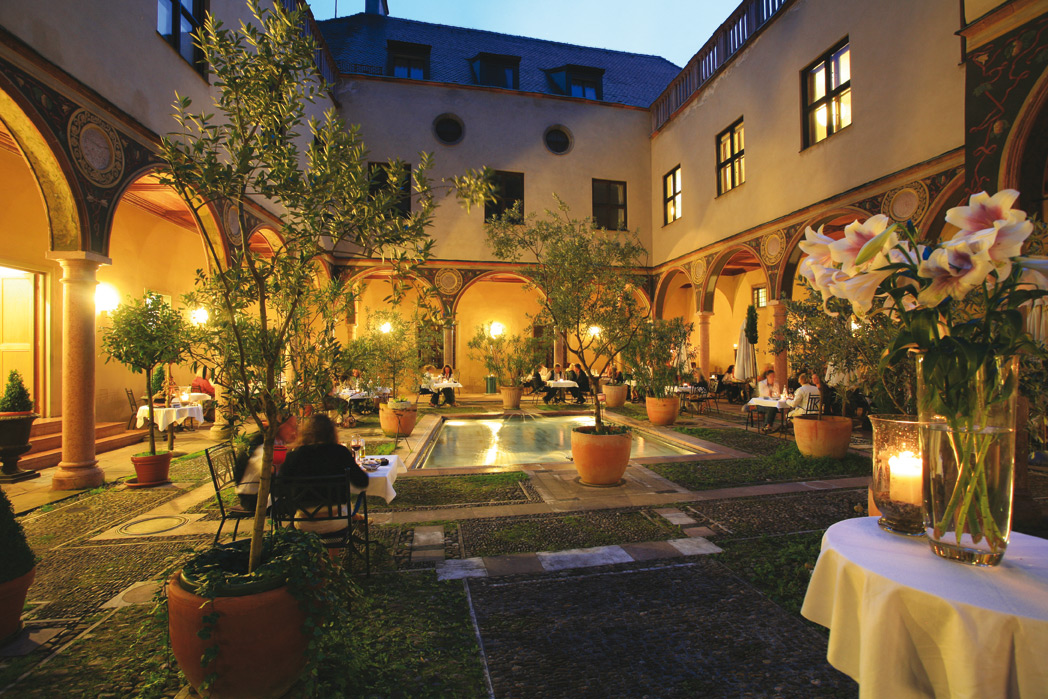
Damenhof in the Fuggerhäuser in Augsburg

The Fugger family already owned two houses in Augsburg in prominent locations when Jakob Fugger built the Fuggerhäuser near the wine-market (now Maximilianstraße) from 1512 to 1515. The Builder of this Residence was most likely Hans Hiebe. Inside the Fuggerhäuser, the Damenhof (Ladies courtyard) was modeled after the florencian style grand courtyards, thus becoming Germany's first secular renaissance building. The complex was expanded once more in 1523 to accommodate the receiving of illustrious guests. The Fuggerhäuser were the private residence and administrative center of Jakob Fugger and his wife Sybille Fugger-Arzt.

Later members of the Fugger family enlarged the complex several times. The complex was mostly destroyed during air raids on Augsburg in World War II and rebuilt in a simplified way in 1955. The courtyards and several other rooms however are still in their original state. The houses are still owned by the Fugger family, partly being used to house the Fürst Fugger Privatbank.

=== St.-Moritz-Prädikatur-Stiftung ===
In 1515 Jakob Fugger advocated for an improved sermon in the church of his parish St. Moritz. In 1517 Pope Leo X issued a papal bull granting Fugger and his heirs the patronage to the church and being able to choose the priest. The foundation still exists and the Fugger family still recommends the priests.

=== Fuggerei ===
View into the Herrengasse of the Fuggerei

Beginning in 1516 Jakob Fugger funded the construction of a settlement for craftsmen and day laborers in need. In 1523, 52 houses of the estate were built. It was first named Fuggerei in 1531. Originally it was meant to house people who were in a difficult situation through no fault of their own until they could establish a stable household on their own. The yearly rent was one symbolic guilder, though additionally requested were three daily prayers in the name of Fugger and his family.

The settlement was expanded several times, lastly in 1973. About 150 people live in the Fuggerei today, still paying an annual rent of the equivalent of one guilder (€0.88). The Fuggerei is a major tourist attraction of Augsburg and since 2006 also houses a museum. The settlement is still administered by the descendants of the Fugger family and financed through a foundation (originally from 1521).

=== Other foundations and buildings ===
Jakob Fugger made several contributions to churches and monasteries in Augsburg some of which still show the Fugger family's coat of arms. He funded the church San Blas in Almagro, Spain and the reconstruction of the Santa Maria dell'Anima in Rome. He also built a chapel in Oberkirchberg as well as building a palace in Weißenhorn.

== Literature ==
=== Academic ===
- Bruno Bushart: Die Fuggerkapelle bei St. Anna in Augsburg, Munich 1994, ISBN 978-3-422-06115-6.
- Richard Ehrenberg: Das Zeitalter der Fugger, Geldkapital und Creditverkehr im 16. Jahrhundert (2 Vol), Jena 1896.
- Peter Geffcken: Jakob Fuggers frühe Jahre. In: Martin Kluger (Augsburg): Jakob Fugger (1459–1525). Sein Leben in Bildern, context medien und verlag, Augsburg 2009, ISBN 978-3-939645-14-6.
- Peter Geffcken: Jakob Fugger der Reiche (1459–1525): "Königsmacher", Stratege und Organisator". in: DAMALS 7/2004.
- Peter Geffcken: Fugger – Geschichte einer Familie: "Die Handelsherren mit dem Dreizack". in: DAMALS 7/2004.
- Mark Häberlein: Die Fugger. Geschichte einer Augsburger Familie (1367–1650), Kohlhammer Verlag, Stuttgart 2006, ISBN 978-3-17-018472-5.
- Sarah Hadry: Die Fugger in Kirchberg und Weißenhorn. Herrschaftsverfassung und Leibeigenschaft, Konfessionalisierung und Residenzbildung, Wißner, Augsburg 2007, ISBN 978-3-89639-613-6.
- Max Jansen: Die Anfänge der Fugger, Leipzig 1907, ISBN 978-3-86741-614-6.
- Peter Kalus: Die Fugger in der Slowakei, Augsburg 1999, ISBN 978-3-89639-175-9.
- Franz Karg: Eines Stadtherren Profil. Jakob der Reiche, der erste Fugger in Weißenhorn, in: Weißenhorner Profile 1160–2010. Beiträge und Untersuchungen zur Stadtgeschichte (Kataloge und Schriften des Weißenhorner Heimatmuseums 5), Weißenhorn 2010.
- Hermann Kellenbenz: Die Fugger in Spanien und Portugal bis 1560. Ein Großunternehmen des 16. Jahrhunderts (2 Vol), Munich 1990, ISBN 978-3-925355-60-8.
- Norbert Lieb: Die Fugger und die Kunst. Band 1: Im Zeitalter der Spätgotik und der frühen Renaissance, Munich 1952.
- Götz von Pölnitz: Jakob Fugger, in: NDB, Neue Deutsche Biographie, 5. Bd. (1961), S. 710–716.
- Götz von Pölnitz: Die Fugger. Mohr & Siebeck, 6. Aufl. Tübingen 1999, ISBN 3-16-147013-3.
- Götz von Pölnitz: Jakob Fugger. Mohr & Siebeck, Tübingen 1949. Preview: Jakob Fugger, Quellen und Erläuterungen.
- Benjamin Scheller: Memoria an der Zeitenwende. Die Stiftungen Jakob Fuggers des Reichen vor und während der Reformation (ca. 1505–1555), Berlin 2004, ISBN 978-3-05-004095-0.
- Aloys Schulte: Die Fugger in Rom 1495–1523 (2 Vol), Leipzig 1904, ISBN 978-5-87416-398-3.
- Marion Tietz-Strödel: Die Fuggerei in Augsburg, Tübingen 1982, ISBN 978-3-16-844570-8.
- Eike Eberhard Unger: Die Fugger in Hall i. T., Tübingen 1967, ASIN B0000BTV29.
- Jacob Strieder: Jacob Fugger the Rich, Washington 1931, ISBN 978-1-163-18704-3.
- Barbara Günther: Sybille Fugger, die Frau Jakobs des Reichen., 1985, ISBN 3-7987-0235-7

=== Popular ===
- Franz Herre: Die Fugger in ihrer Zeit. Wißner-Verlag, 12. Auflage, Augsburg 2005, ISBN 3-89639-490-8.
- Tanja Kinkel: "Die Puppenspieler". München 1993
- Martin Kluger: Die Fugger in Augsburg. Kaufherrn, Stifter und Mäzene, context verlag, Augsburg 2010, ISBN 978-3-939645-31-3.
- Martin Kluger: Die Fugger: Die deutschen Medici in und um Augsburg, context verlag, Augsburg 2009, ISBN 978-3-939645-13-9.
- Martin Kluger: "Jakob Fugger (1459–1525). Sein Leben in Bildern", context medien und verlag, Augsburg 2009, ISBN 978-3-939645-14-6
- Martin Kluger: Die Fuggerei. Ein Führer durch die älteste Sozialsiedlung der Welt. context-verlag, Augsburg 2009, ISBN 978-3-939645-16-0
- Martin Kluger: Fugger – Italien. Geschäfte, Hochzeiten, Wissen und Kunst. Geschichte einer fruchtbaren Beziehung, context medien und verlag, Augsburg 2010, ISBN 978-3-939645-27-6.
- Martin Kluger: The Fugger Dynasty in Augsburg. Merchants, Mining Entrepreneurs, Bankers and Benefactors. context verlag Augsburg, Augsburg 2014, ISBN 978-3-939645-74-0.
- Günter Ogger: Kauf dir einen Kaiser. Die Geschichte der Fugger. Droemer Knaur, 17. Auflage, Munich 1995, ISBN 3-426-03613-4.
- Greg Steinmetz, The Richest Man Who Ever Lived: The Life and Times of Jacob Fugger (New York, NY: Simon & Schuster, 2015). ISBN 978-1-451-68855-9

=== In fiction ===
- Florian M. Nebel: Fugger's Legacy KDP, 2025, ISBN 979-8265932006.
- Peter Dempf: Das Amulett der Fuggerin BLT, Bergisch-Gladbach 2006, ISBN 978-3-404-92273-4.
- Rebecca Abe: Im Labyrinth der Fugger Gmeiner 2011, ISBN 978-3-8392-1144-1.
- Patrick O'Brian: The Thirteen Gun Salute Collins (UK) 1989, ISBN 0-00-223460-2.
- Neal Stephenson, Nicole Galland: The Rise and Fall of D.O.D.O. William Morrow 2017, ISBN 978-00-62409-16-4.
