= Johann Jakob Fugger =

German banker and patron of the arts and sciences (1516–1575)

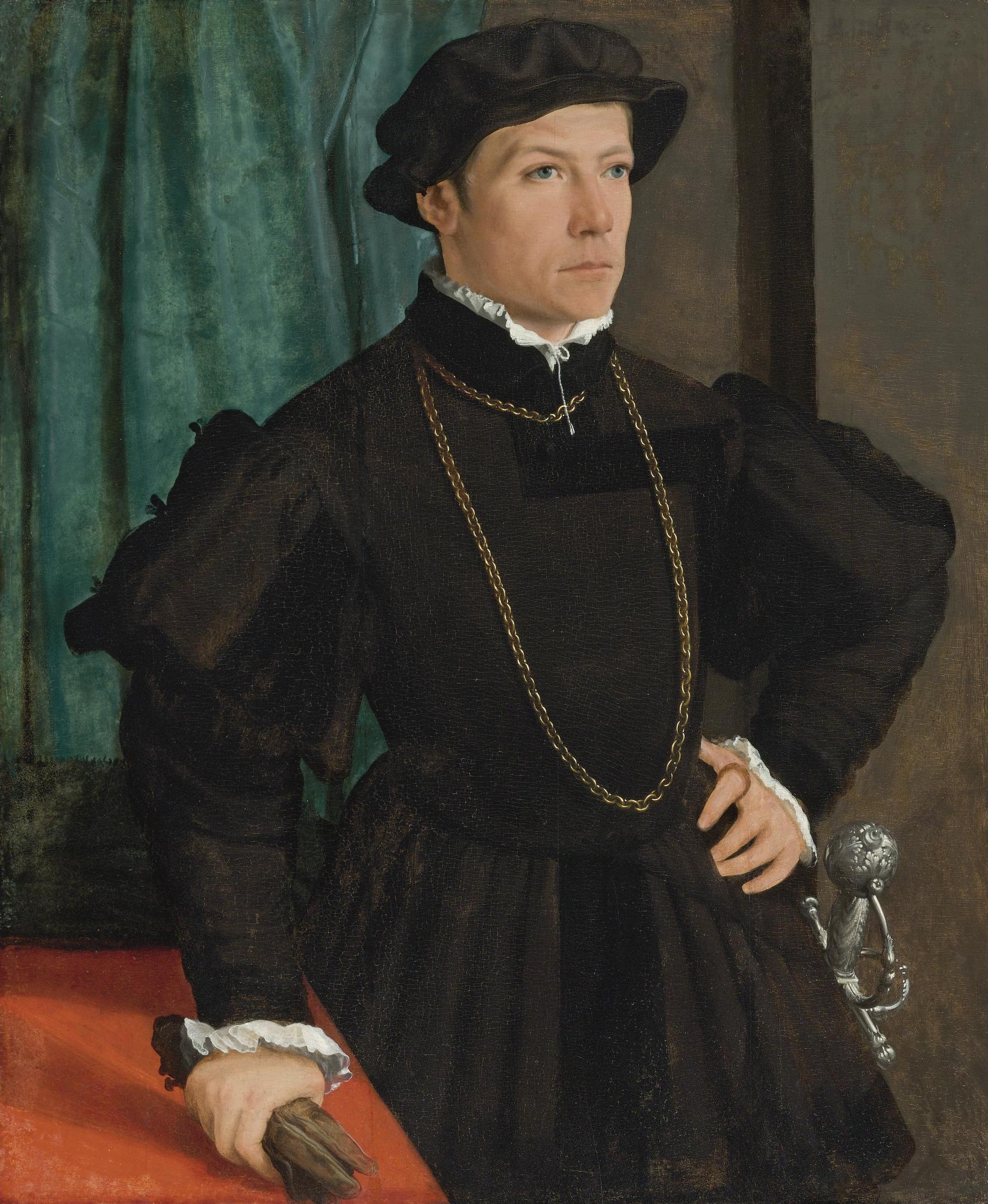
Johann Jakob Fugger by Christoph Amberger, 1541.

Johann Jakob Fugger or Hans Jakob Fugger (23 December 1516, Augsburg - 14 July 1575, Munich) was a German banker and patron of the arts and sciences from the von der Lilie (of the Lily) line of the noted Fugger banking family.

== Life ==
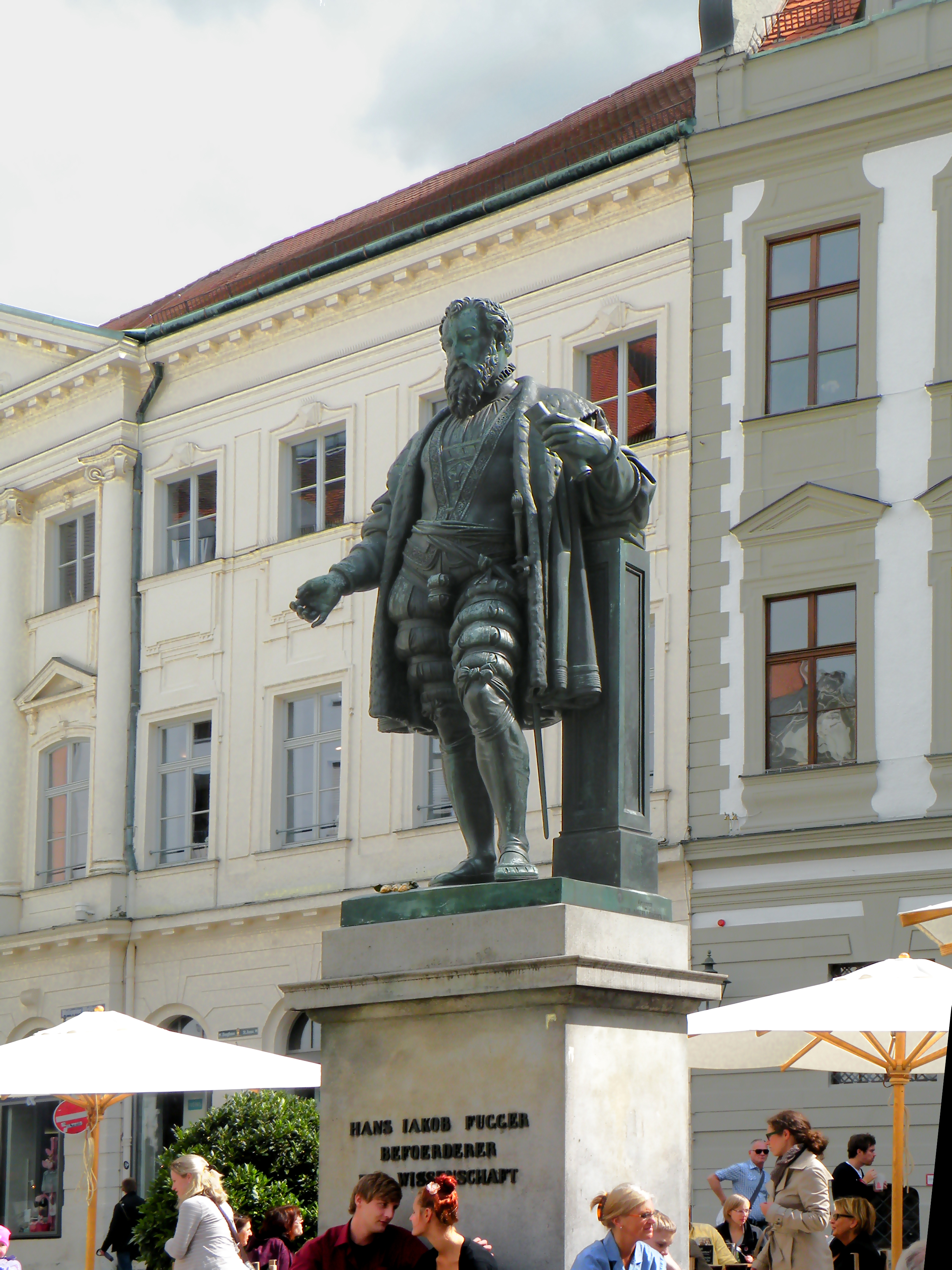
Memorial to Johann Jakob Fugger in Augsburg, put up by Louis I of Bavaria.

He was the son of Raymund Fugger (1489–1535) and his wife Katharina Thurzó (1488–1535), daughter of János Thurzó, owner of a mining company. Johann Jakob inherited the business from his father's brother Anton Fugger in 1560 but did not prove so fortunate in his business dealings - the family had lent money to Charles V, Holy Roman Emperor, landing them in deep trouble when Spain went bankrupt. Johann Jakob had to sell off his whole collection (except his library) to improve matters and handed the business over to his cousin Marcus (1529–1597), who was able to consolidate it. In 1565 he entered Albert V's service and later became president of his privy chamber.

On Titian's advice, Johann Jakob brought Titian's pupil Antonio Ponzano to Augsburg to paint frescoes in the inner courtyard of the Fuggerhäuser - frescoes had already been painted on the building's inner courtyard and outer wall by Hans Burckmair the Younger (1500–1562) and Albrecht Altdorfer. Jacopo Strada also acted as Johann Jakob's art agent in Italy. He was in correspondence with cardinal de Grandvelle - one of his letters to him was included in Pelisson's Traité de la Tolérance des religions (Treatise on Tolerance of religions). He also had a major library and tried to convince Hieronymus Wolf to become its librarian. In 1571 he sold it to Albert V, making it the nucleus of the Bayerische Staatsbibliothek.

Johann Jakob is also thought to be the author of the two folio-volume Wahrhaftigen Beschreibung des österreichischen und habsburgischen Rahmens, Herkommens, Geschlechte, Fortpflanzung (True Description of the Austrian and Habsburg Houses...), written in German, with over 30,000 coats of arms, seals, portraits and other images. Copies of it survive in libraries in Vienna and Dresden, Lambécius and Rollar published fragments from it and Sigismond de Birken published an extract under the title Spiegel der Ehren des höchstlöblichen Kayser- und Königlichen Ertzhauses Oesterreich (Mirror of the Lords of the most high Imperial and Kingly House of Austria).

== Marriage and issue ==
He married twice:

- in 1540, Ursula von Harrach (1522–1554):
  - Eleonora (1541–1576); ∞ 1558 Freiherr Sigmund von Lamberg (1536–1619)
  - Sigmund (1542–1600)
  - Karl (1543–1580); ∞ Anna Starkh
  - Alexander Secundus (1546–1612), cathedral provost in Freising
  - Viktor August (1547–1586), canon in Passau
  - Justina Benigna (1548–1600), Freiin zu Altkainach; ∞ 1573 Friedrich von Holleneck († 1593)
  - Maximilian (1550–1588), Deutschordenscomptur in Sterzing; ∞ 1547 Anna von Egkh
  - Severin (1551–1601), Herr zu Schwabmünchen; ∞ 1583 Katharina von Helfenstein (1563–1627)
  - Ferdinand (1552–1580)
- in 1560, Sidonia von Colaus or Wazler († 1572):

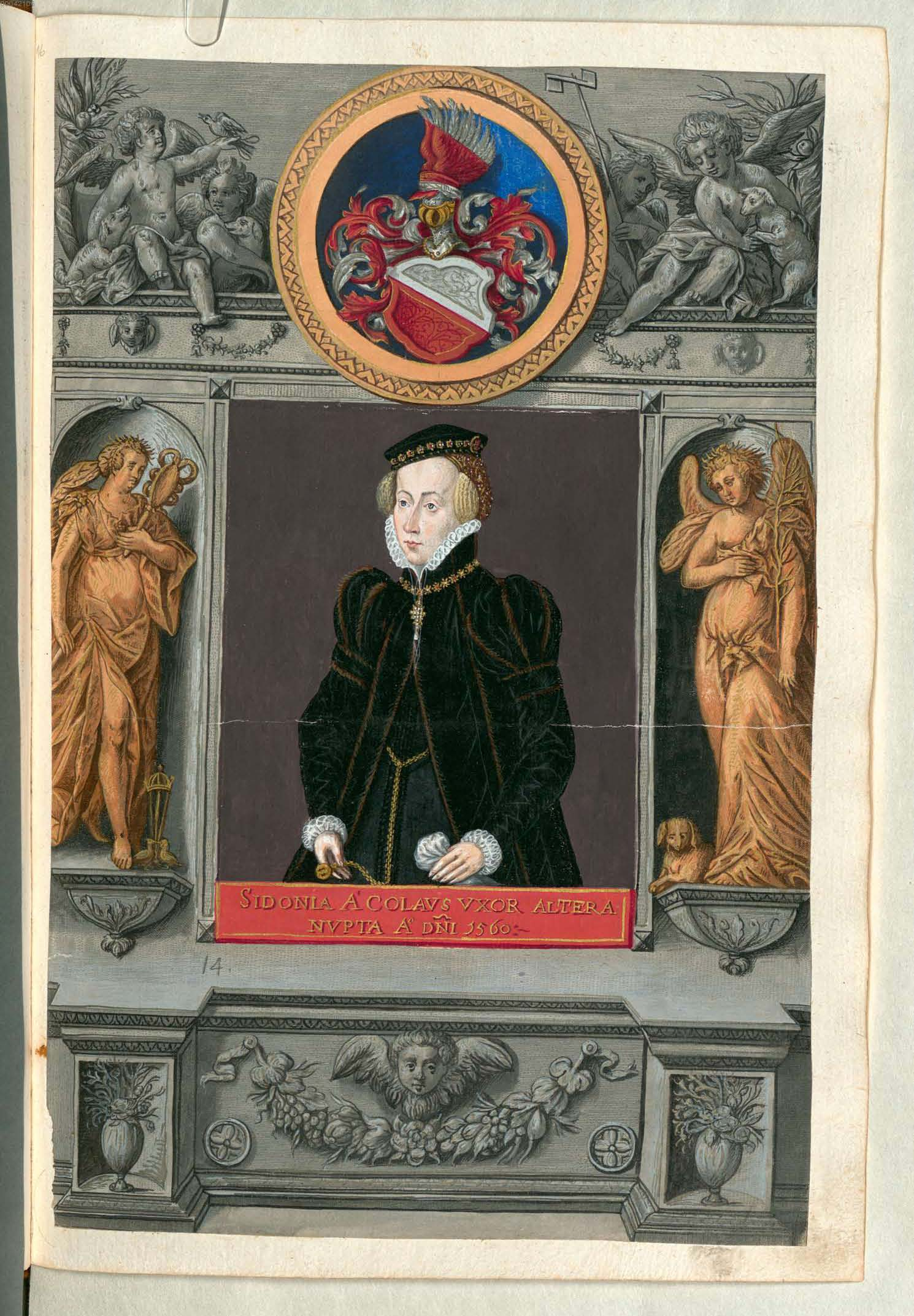
Sidonia von Colau

  - Adalberta (1560–1611); ∞ 1582 Freiherr Christoph von Welsperg († 1634)
  - Alexius (1562–1623), Herr von Adelshofen; ∞ 1593 Maria von Gumppenberg (1570–1613)
  - Joachim (1563–1607), Herr von Taufkirchen und Altenerding; ∞ 1590 Gräfin Magdalen von Helfenstein (1562–1622)
  - Aemilia (1564–1611); ∞ 1582 Freiherr Alexander von und zu Sprinzenstein († 1597)
  - Albrecht (1565–1624); ∞ 1600 Katharina von Gumppenberg (1581–1661)
  - Alfons (1567–1569)
  - Constantia (1568–1594); ∞ 1592 Bernhardin II. von Herberstein Reichsfreiherr zu Neuberg und Gutenhag (1566–1624)
  - Konstantin I. (1569–1627), Herr zu Zinnenberg; ∞ 1597 Anna Maria Münich von Münchhausen
  - Trajan (1571–1609), Herr von Untersulmentingen; ∞ 1596 Regina von Freyberg
  - Matthias (1572–1603); ∞ Anna Jakobäa von Köckritz († 1600)
