= Raymund Fugger =

German businessman

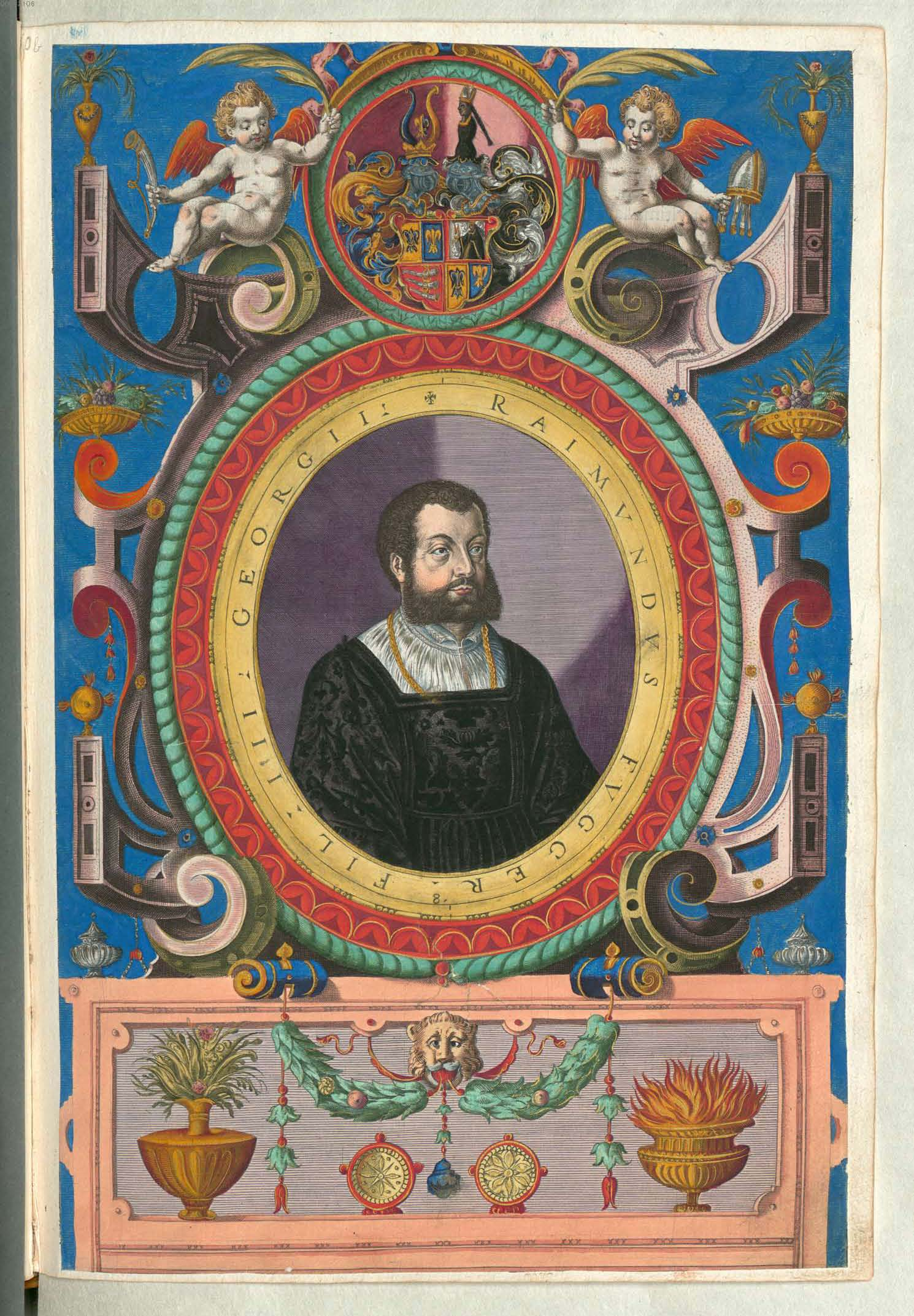
Raymund Fugger - colour copperplate from Fuggerorum et Fuggerarum imagines, 1618

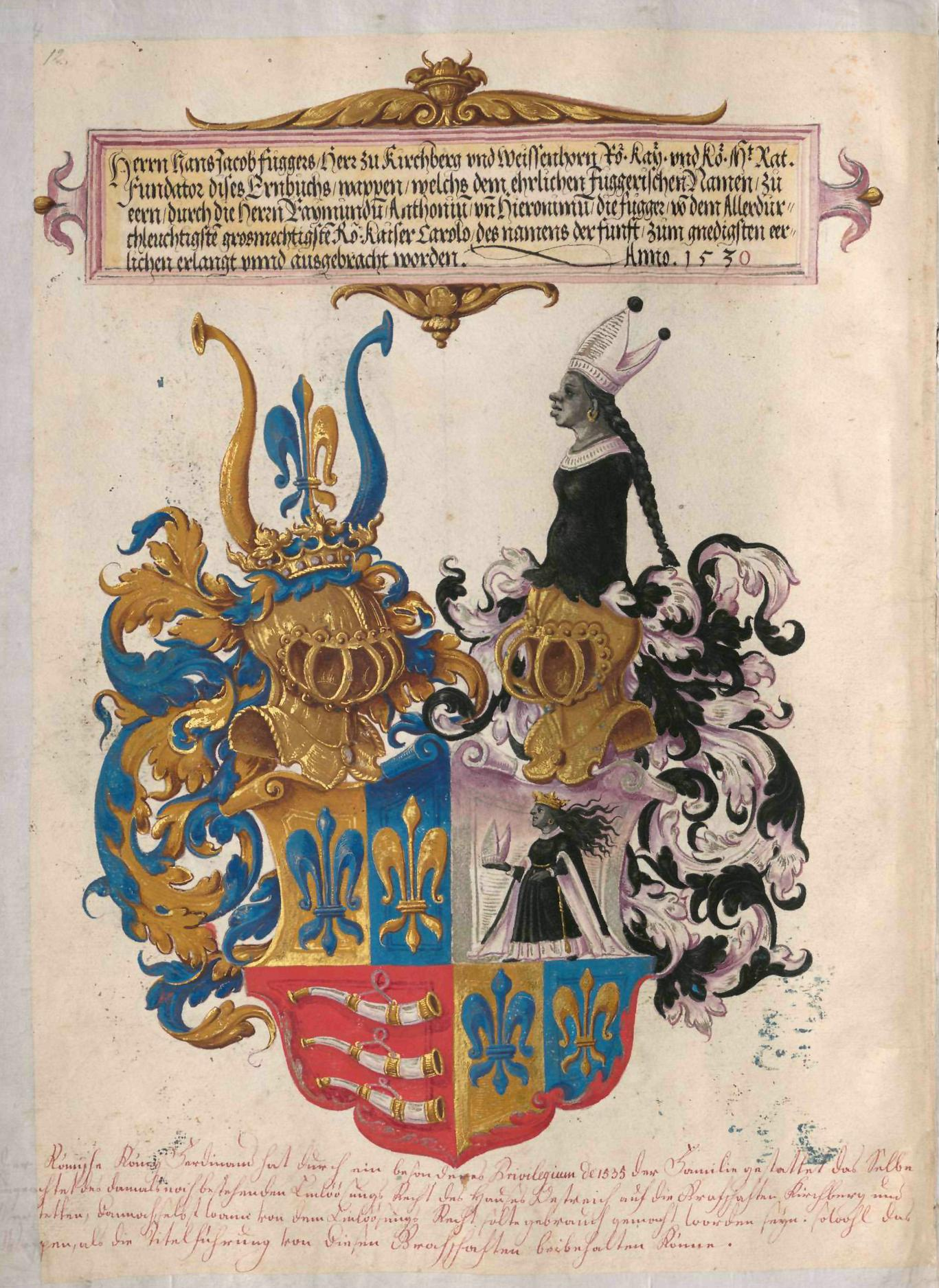
Fugger coat of arms, granted in 1530

Raymund or Raimund Fugger (24 October 1489 – 3 December 1535) was a German businessman, Imperial Count and art collector of the 'of the Lily' (von der Lilie) branch of the Fugger family.

== Life ==
Fugger was born on 24 October 1489 in Augsburg. He was the second son of Georg Fugger. After his father's death in 1506 his education was probably overseen by Georg's brother Jakob. From autumn 1509 to 1510 Raymund took care of his uncle's financial affairs at the court of Maximilian I, Holy Roman Emperor. Between February and May 1511 Raymund also acted as a representative at the congress of ambassadors in Mantua before staying with Pope Julius II. Jakob wrote a will on 30 December 1512, making his other nephew Ulrich Fugger the Younger head of the business, to be followed by Raymond. At the same time he wrote a special contract giving Ulrich and Raymund a privileged position regarding his copper mines in Hungary and his real estate – it gave Raymund and his brother Anton a one-third share each in that real estate.

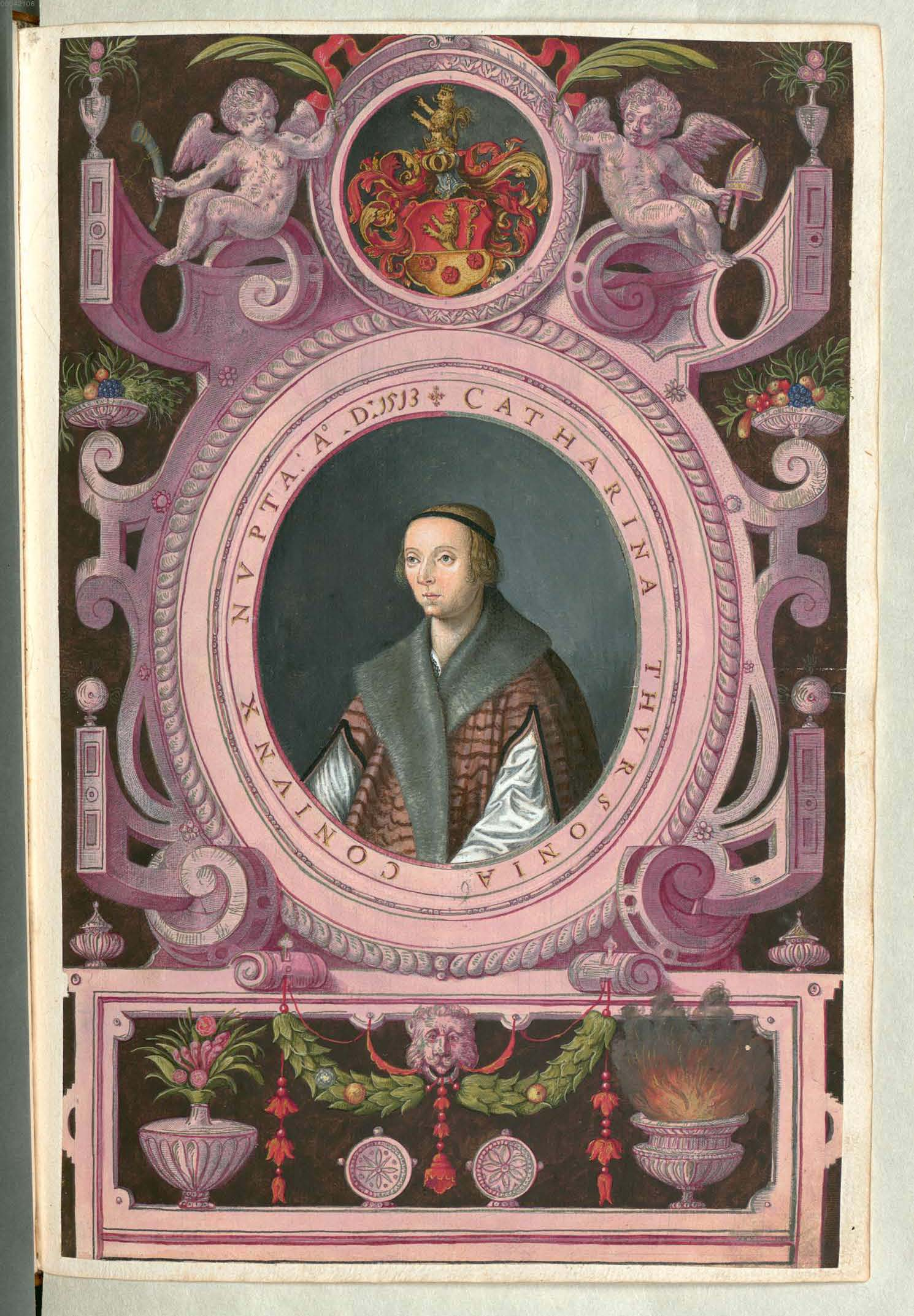
His wife Katharina Thurzó

Raymund next moved to Kraków, a major trading centre for his own family and for the mine-owners the Thurzó family. On 16 January 1513 he married Katherina, daughter of the mining engineer and businessman János Thurzó. Raymund was also Jakob's first choice as head of the joint Fugger-Thurzó mining company in Kraków and he initially agreed, before buying the lordship of Biberach jointly with Ulrich the Younger and settling in Augsburg by 1515 at the latest, as is clear from the tax records. His wife remained in Kraków, where their second son was born and died, both in 1516. Their children included Ulrich Fugger III (1526–1584), a papal chamberlain, and Johann Jakob (1516–1575), art collector and businessman.

Raymund built up a major estate in Augsburg which the humanist Beatus Rhenanus regarded as equal to the gardens of Francis I of France. He also befriended the humanist Erasmus of Rotterdam and the Protestant reformer Philipp Melanchthon as well as gathering a large library. His main interests were his own family history as well as science and classical antiquity. His collection of artworks and antiquities is now largely scattered, but was described by Rhenanus when he was allowed to visit Raymund's house and gardens on the Kleesattlergasse in 1530. It included Italian and especially Venetian paintings, although only one can be definitely traced back to Fugger's collection, namely Vincenzo Catena of Raymund. Raymund also patronised Lucas Cranach the Elder, who he may have met in Kraków. His books included an illuminated layman's prayer-book. He mainly acquired his ancient coins and sculptures from Greece, southern Italy and Sicily, possibly through Venice via the family's trading networks – among other things Rhenanus described "a clothed, prancing figure, holding in its raised right hand a vessel in animal form, in its left a small bowl with a lion's head" and "a naked warrior with helmet, holding in his hands two snakes". He also commissioned medals himself.

Raymund made several business and trade trips in the following years. In 1522–1523 he was unable to maintain the Fuggers' monopoly on trade in Nuremberg, but was able to prevent the company going into liquidation. Jakob changed his will on 22 December 1525 – since Ulrich the Younger had already died and Jakob's other nephew Hieronymus Fugger had withdrawn from the company, Raymond and Anton were to head the business after Jakob's death, which occurred on 30 December the same year. Due to the Fuggers' financial links with the House of Habsburg, Charles V appointed Raymond to the Imperial Diet and granted him exemption from the jurisdiction of the Rottweil and Westphalian courts, among others. On 30 June Charles V also confirmed Raymond and his heirs as owners of Kirchberg, Weißenhorn, Wullenstetten and Biberbach.

Raymund was present when Charles V entered the Imperial Diet at Augsburg on 15 June 1530. On 14 November he granted the Fuggers the right to change their coat of arms to match their new status and on 1 March 1534 granted them the right to mint coins. On 20 June 1535 Ferdinand I, Holy Roman Emperor gave the Fuggers the right to call themselves 'Counts of Kirchberg, Weißenhorn and Marstetten' and four days later Raymund was also raised to the Hungarian nobility. On 3 December 1535 in Mickhausen, however, Raymund died of a stroke in his doctors' presence – he had been ill since a young age, as shown by his portraits by Holbein and others.
