= Barbara Fugger =

German businessperson and banker (1419–1497)

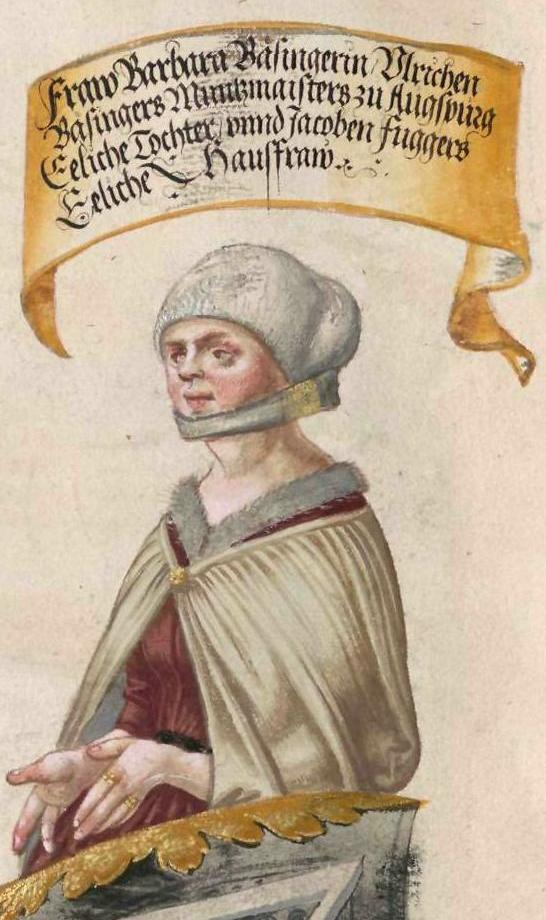
- Portrait of Barbara Fugger.
- Born: 1419; Augsburg
- Died: 23 July 1497 (aged 77–78)
- Occupation: Banker

Barbara Fugger (née Bäsinger; 1419 – 23 July 1497) was a German businessperson and banker.

== Biography ==
Barbara Bäsinger was born to a wealthy family in Augsburg, Germany. In 1441, she married textile merchant Jakob Fugger the Elder. She had eleven children with him before he died, including Ulrich, Georg and Jakob Fugger. She successfully managed the family business and eventually traded internationally in linen and wool. She provided money for her sons' businesses and her daughters' dowries. After the death of her spouse in 1469, she managed the Fugger bank until her death in 1497. She was assisted by her sons, but they did not gain full access until after her death.
