= Hans Daucher =

German Renaissance Woodcarver, Sculptor and Medal designer

- Born: 1486
- Died: 1538 (aged 51–52)
- Known for: Wood carving

Hans Daucher (1486, Augsburg – 1538, Stuttgart) was a German Renaissance wood carver, sculptor and medal designer.

== Life ==
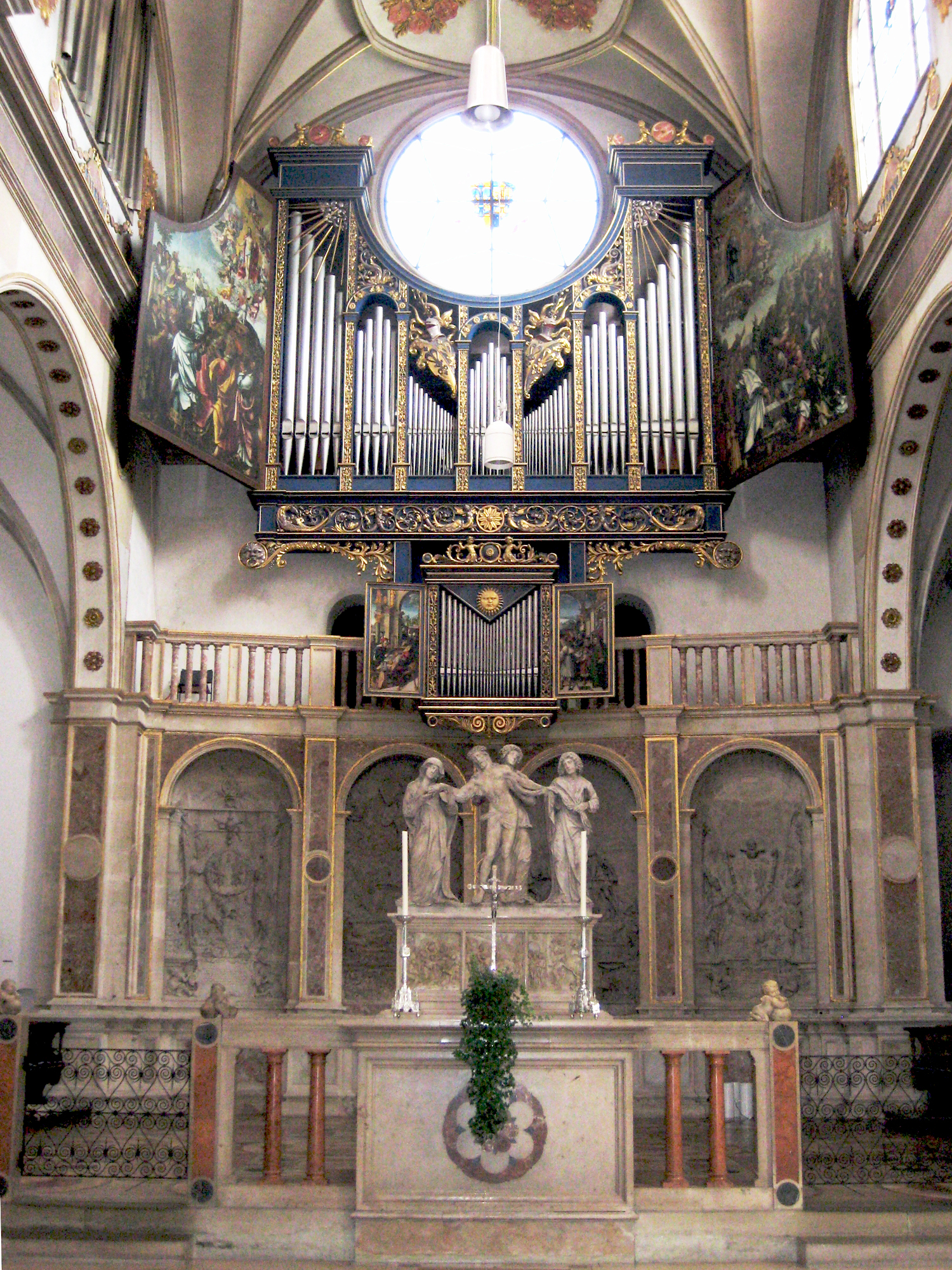
The high altar of the St. Annakirche

Hans and his father, the sculptor and woodcarver Adolf Daucher (c. 1460, Ulm – c. 1524, Augsburg), both worked in Augsburg and belonged to the Ulm School. Either Hans or Adolf produced the altarpiece weighing 370 talents which has been on the high altar of the Evangelical Lutheran St. Annenkirche in Annaberg-Buchholz, though it was long thought to be a collaboration between them. Some of its materials originated in the Ore Mountains on the Czech border, 403 kilometres from Augsburg. In 1522 the work was unveiled in the 'Hauptchor' or upper choir of the church. The Solhofen limestone sculptures were surrounded by a framework made up of ten different types of Italian marble. Hans is also known to have worked independently on the Fugger Chapel in the same church after 1512 – its central Corpus Christi and Lamentation of Christ groups, the putti on the marble balustrade in front of the chapel and the choir stalls are his work.

Daucher's sculpture The Lamentation of Christ, dated to around 1500, is in Notre-Dame-de-la-Nativité in the town of Saverne. Hans also worked between 1515 and 1516 on the late Gothic decoration of the Rathaus in Augsburg. Schindler considers the marble monument to the nobles of Hürnheim in Hochaltingen to be Daucher's masterpiece. He was so in demand that he had to maintain a large studio in Augsburg, with one area producing and processing huge marble blocks for his sculptures and another for melting and casting medals and cooling his large and small sculptures. It also included a desk with his drawing instruments, where he produced designs after living and dissected models – Daucher often dissected these himself, using a basement filled with ice tubs to preserve the specimens and bodies.

== Selected works ==
=== Reliefs ===
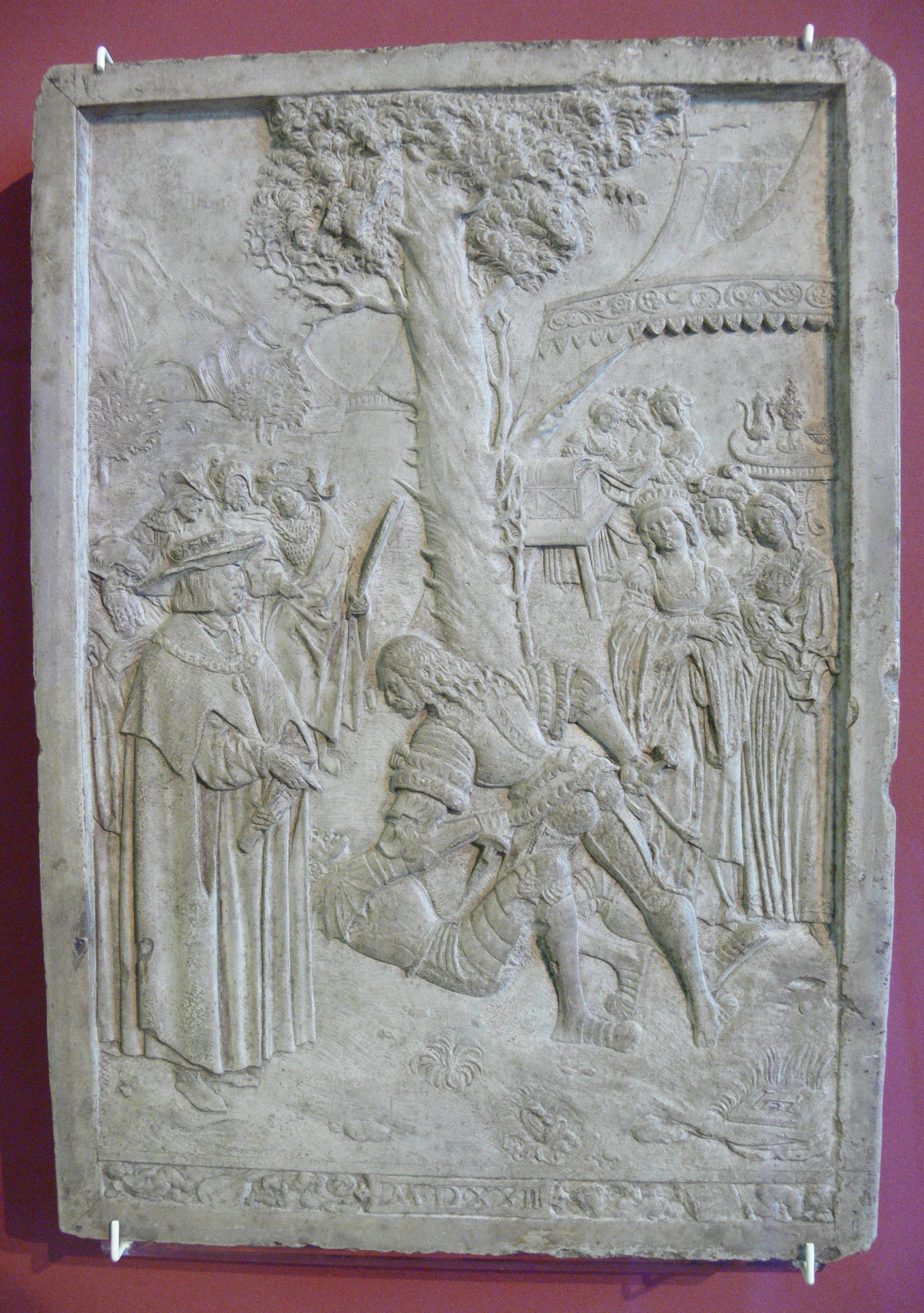
Daucher: Allegorical Battle Between Dürer and Apelles

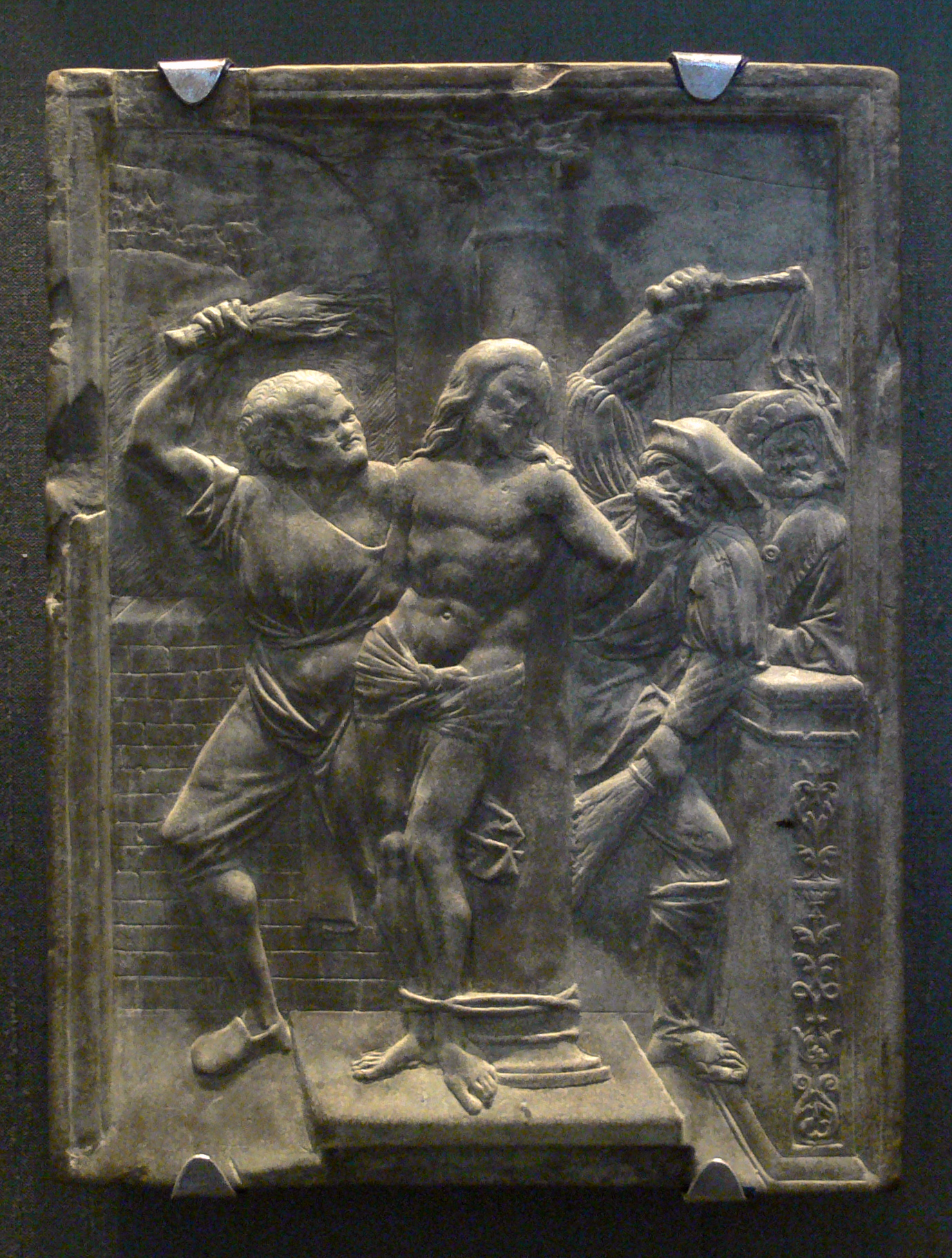
Daucher: The Flagellation of Christ.

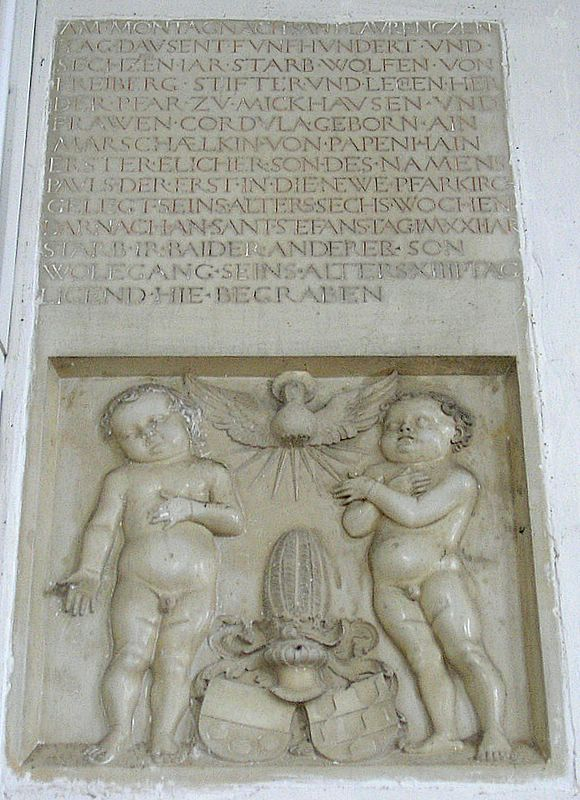
Epitaph

=== Medals ===
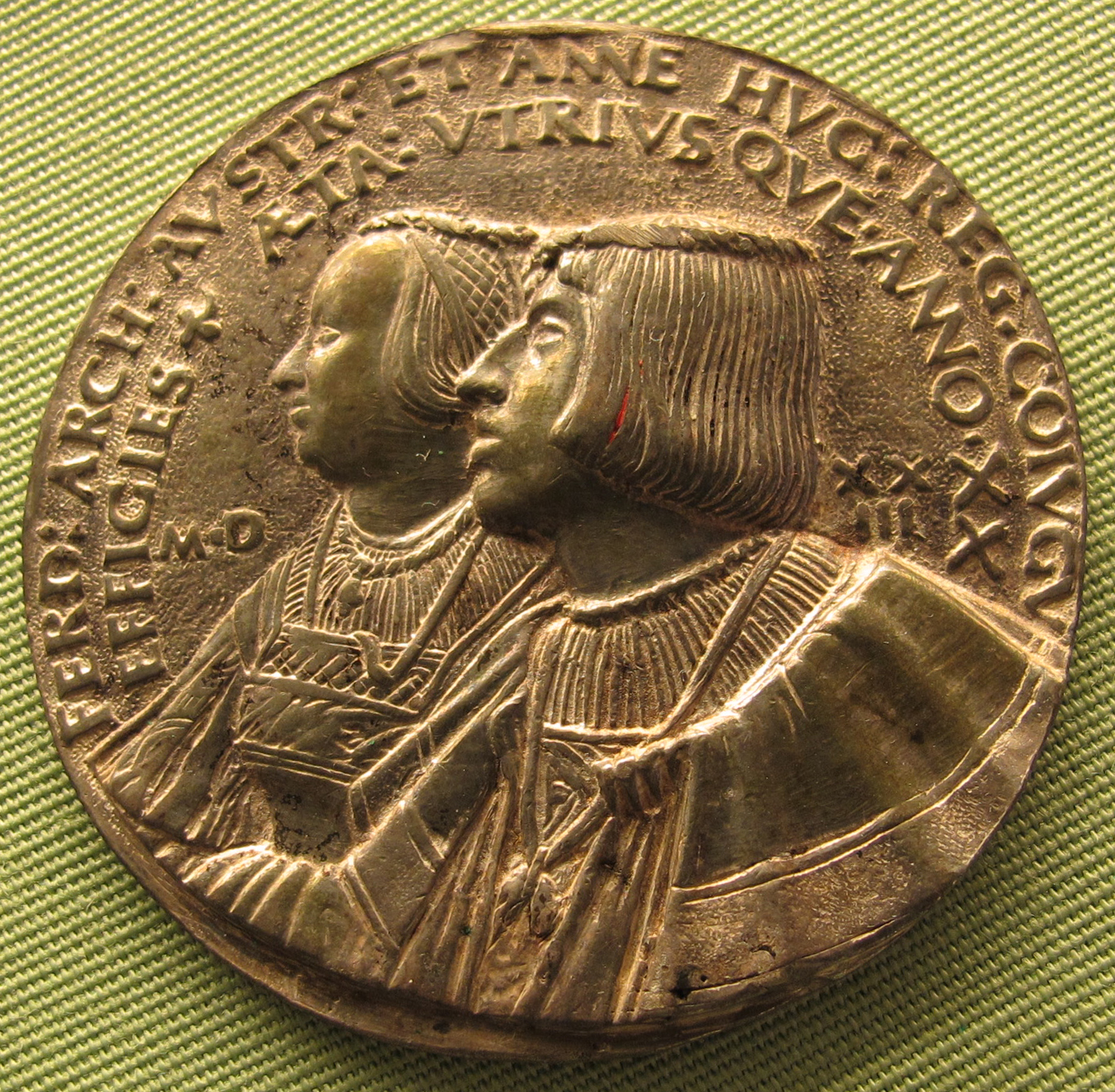
Daucher: Ferdinand and Anna of Bohemia, 1523, SMM.

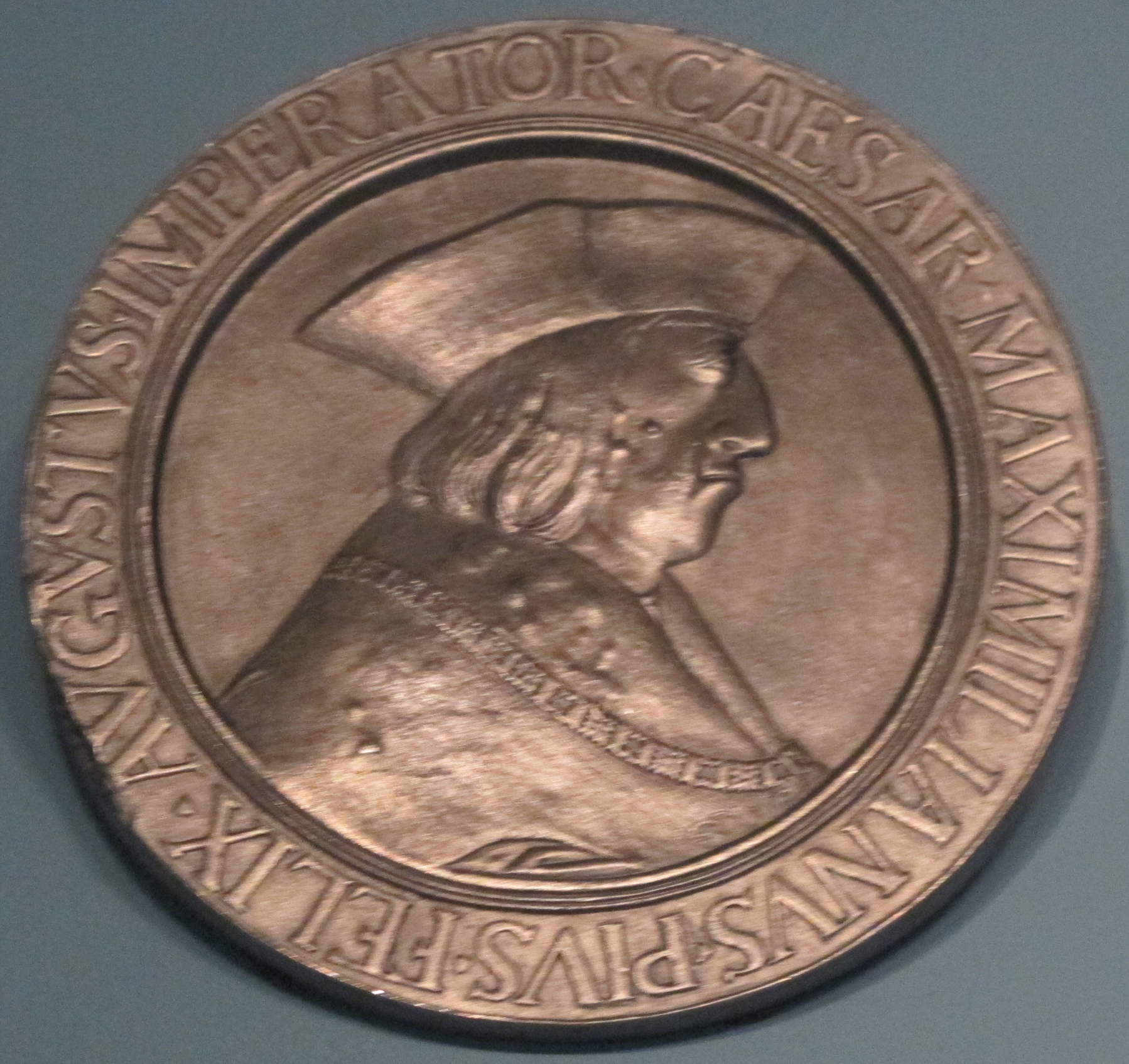
Maximilian I, Holy Roman Emperor

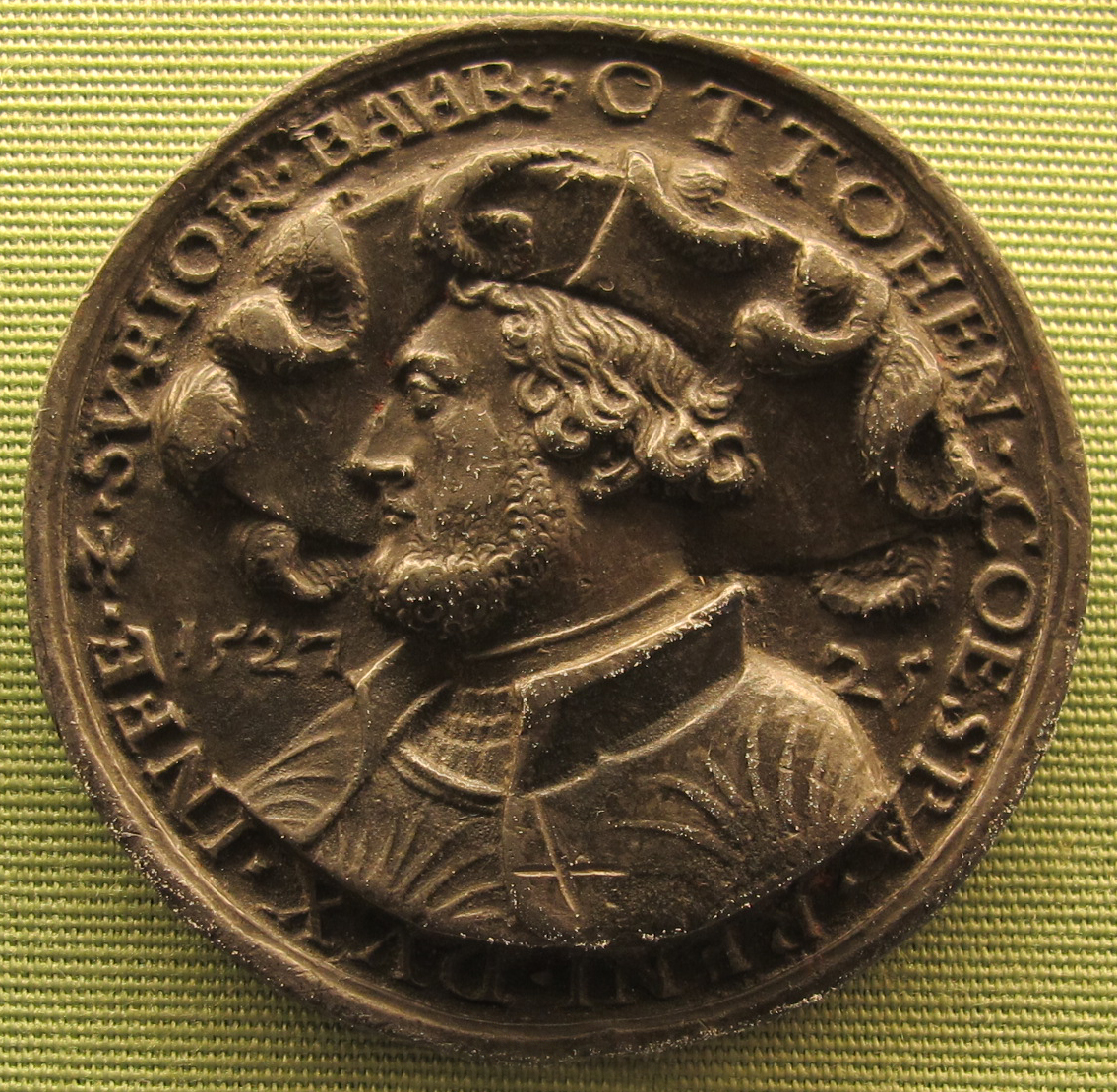
Ottheinrich von Pfalz-Neuburg, 1527.Staatliche Münzsammlung München SMM

== Bibliography ==
- Eser, Thomas: Hans Daucher. München/Berlin 1996
