= János Thurzó =

Hungarian entrepreneur and mining engineer

János Thurzó (Hungarian: Thurzó János, German: Johann T(h)urzo, Polish: Jan Turzo, Slovak: Ján T(h)urzo; 30 April 1437 in Levoča (Lewscen in 15th century) – 10 October 1508 in Nagybánya) was a Hungarian entrepreneur and mining engineer. From 1477 until his death he was an Alderman (a member of the city council) of Kraków, Poland, and even became its mayor for a while.

By establishing "The Common Hungarian Trade" (German: Gemeine Ungarische Handel, also known as Fugger–Thurzo company), he developed a very profitable business relationship with Jakob Fugger, which held a de facto monopoly over copper mining and trade in the Holy Roman Empire around 1500.

Thurzo first married Ursula Boehm and the couple had three sons: György Thurzó who married Anna Fugger, later György Thurzó became the mayor of Kraków; another son of János, became the archbishop of Breslau (today Wroclaw); and their third son became the bishop of Olomouc.

His second marriage was with Barbara Beck: their daughter Katharina married Raymund Fugger and was mother of Johann Jakob Fugger.

== See also ==
- Thurzó family
