= Rebecca Abe =

German writer and illustrator

Stephanie Fey
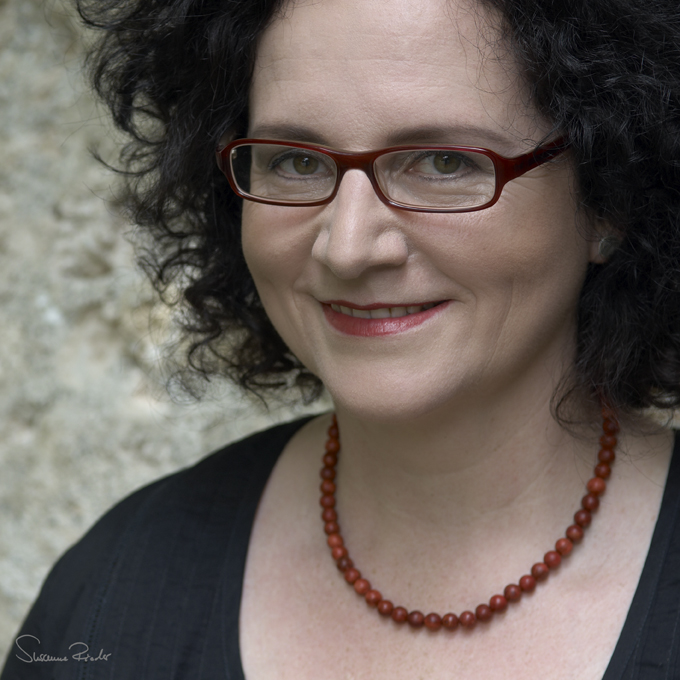
- Born: 1967 (age 58–59); Starnberg, West Germany
- Occupations: Writer and illustrator
- Writing career
- Pen name: Rebecca Abe, Stephanie Schuster, and Ida Ding

Stephanie Fey, who also publishes under the names Rebecca Abe, Stephanie Schuster and Ida Ding, (born 1967, in Starnberg, West Germany) is a German writer and illustrator.

== Biography ==
Stephanie Fey studied graphic design in Munich, and she has illustrated several school and children's books. Her first published illustrations were for an edition of Heidi by Johanna Spyri.

== Works ==
=== As Rebecca Abe ===
- Das Gedächtnis der Lüge. Skalding Verlag, 2008
- Im Labyrinth der Fugger. Gmeiner-Verlag 2011

=== As Stephanie Fey ===
- Die Gesichtslosen, 2011
- Die Verstummten, 2013
- Die Zerrissenen, 2015

=== As Ida Ding ===
- Hendlmord, 2015
- Jungfernfahrt, 2015

=== As Stephanie Schuster ===
- Der Augenblick der Zeit, 2018

==== Anthologies ====
- 24 Geschichten zur Winterzeit. Esslinger Verlag, 2009
