= Greg Steinmetz =

American journalist and author

- Born: Cleveland, Ohio, U.S.
- Occupation: Journalist; author; securities analyst
- Education: Colgate University (BA); Medill School of Journalism

Greg Steinmetz is an American journalist, retired securities analyst and author of two financial biographies: The Richest Man Who Ever Lived: The LIfe and Times of Jacob Fugger and American Rascal: How Jay Gould Built Wall Street's Biggest Fortune.

Steinmetz was born and raised in Cleveland, Ohio. He graduated from Colgate University in 1983 with a Bachelor of Arts degree in History and German, and earned a master's degree from the Medill School of Journalism at Northwestern University.

Steinmetz spent 15 years working as a journalist for the Sarasota Herald-Tribune, the Houston Chronicle, Newsday, and The Wall Street Journal. He served as the Bureau Chief for The Wall Street Journal in Berlin and London. In 2023, he retired from a New York money management firm where he was a partner and a member of the board of a mutual fund.

In his 2015 book The Richest Man Who Ever Lived: The Life and Times of Jacob Fugger, he explores how Fugger, a banker from Renaissance, Germany, triggered the Reformation, enabled Charles V to build an empire and created the world's first low-income housing project. His 2022 book, American Rascal: How Jay Gould Built Wall Street's Biggest Fortune, argues Gould was as rich, ruthless and powerful as John D. Rockefeller, Andrew Carnegie and other Gilded Age contemporaries but has been largely forgotten because he didn't live long enough to build a philanthropic legacy.

His third book, The President and the Plutocrat: Roosevelt, Mellon and the Triumph of Big Government, will appear in the fall of 2026.

== Books ==
- The Richest Man Who Ever Lived: The Life and Times of Jacob Fugger. 2015. Simon and Schuster. ISBN 978-1451688559. Review at New York Review of Books, 2016
- American Rascal: How Jay Gould Built Wall Street's Biggest. 2022. Simon and Schuster. ISBN 978-1982107406.
