= Bernhardin II von Herberstein =

Austrian nobleman

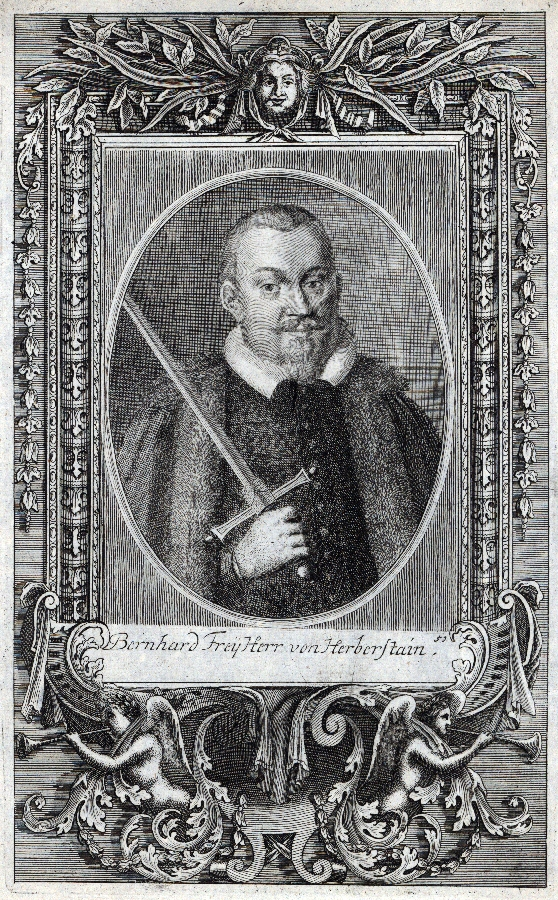
Bernhardin II. von Herberstein (Tripota)

Bernhard II. von Herberstein (1566 - 30 July 1624) was an Austrian nobleman, who was Reichsfreiherr of Neuberg and Gutenhag, Prince of Lankowitz in the Duchy of Carinthia, and Lord of the lordships of Herberstein, Reifenstein and Krems.

He was in the special favor of Archduke Ferdinand II of Austria, later Emperor Ferdinand II (1587–1637), who appointed him Archducal Chamberlain, Oberststallmeister and later privy councilor and Imperial Oberst-Hofmarschall. He was also highly valued by Archduchess consort Maria Anna Duchess of Bavaria.
