= Constantin, 3rd Prince of Waldburg-Zeil =

German prince (1807–1862)

Constantin
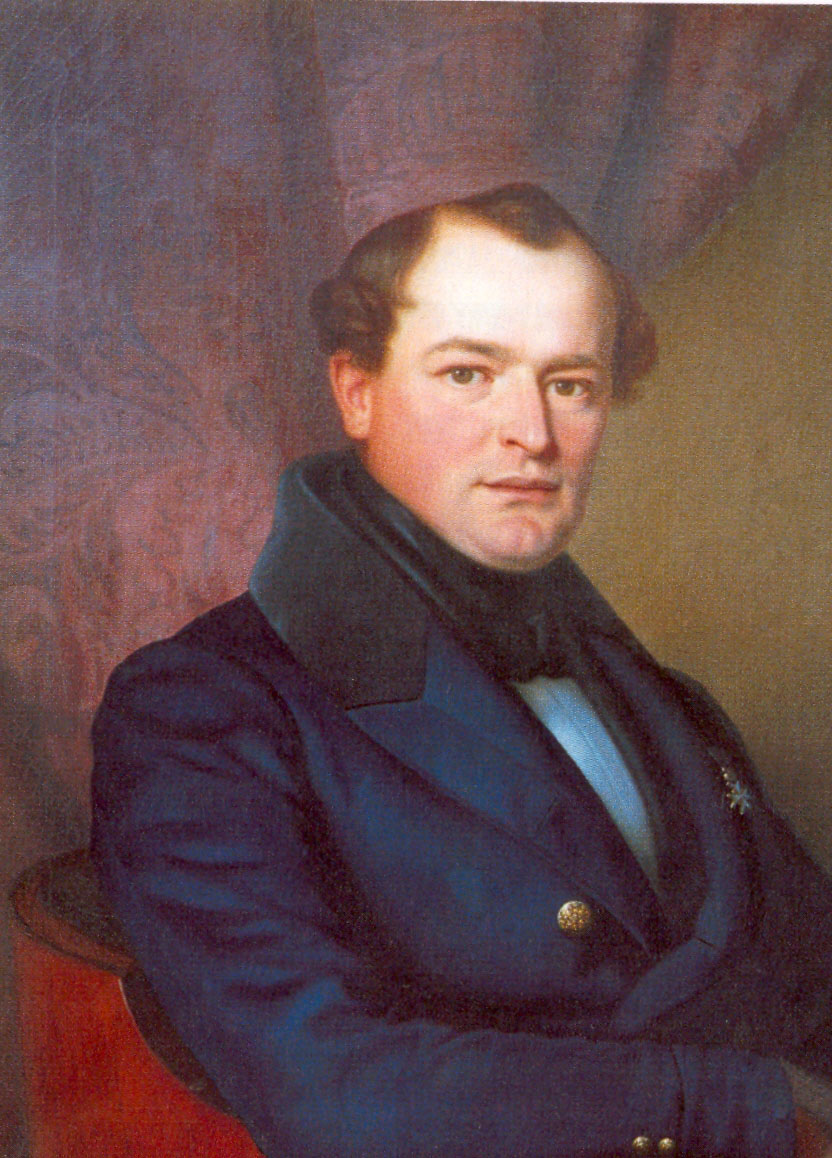

Prince of Waldburg-Zeil-Trauchburg
- Tenure: 2 August 1955 – 17 December 1862
- Predecessor: Franz
- Successor: Wilhelm
- Born: 8 January 1807; Kleinheubach
- Died: 17 December 1862 (aged 55); Kenzingen
- Spouse: Countess Maximiliane von Quadt-Wykrath-Isny (m. 1833; died 1862)
- Issue: Countess Ottolina of Waldburg-Zeil; Wilhelm, 4th Prince of Waldburg-Zeil; Count Konstantin of Waldburg-Zeil; Countess Alexandrine of Waldburg-Zeil; Count Karl of Waldburg-Syrgenstein; Anna, Baroness von Enzberg
Names
- Constantin Maximilian von Waldburg zu Zeil und Trauchburg
- House: Waldburg-Zeil
- Father: Franz, 2nd Prince of Waldburg-Zeil
- Mother: Princess Christiane of Löwenstein-Wertheim-Rosenberg

Constantin Maximilian, 3rd Prince of Waldburg-Zeil-Trauchburg (8 January 1807 – 17 December 1862) was a Royal Württemberg Standesherr, Royal Bavarian Imperial Councillor, Landlord in Baden and member of the Frankfurt National Assembly.

== Early life ==
Constantin was born on 8 January 1807 in Kleinheubach. He was the son of Franz, 2nd Prince of Waldburg-Zeil-Trauchburg (1778–1845) and Princess Christiane of Löwenstein-Wertheim-Rosenberg (1782–1811).

His paternal grandparents were Maximilian, 1st Prince of Waldburg-Zeil and Baroness Maria von Hornstein. His maternal grandparents were Dominic Constantine, Prince of Löwenstein-Wertheim-Rochefort, and Princess Leopoldine of Hohenlohe-Waldenburg-Bartenstein. His maternal uncle was Charles Thomas, Prince of Löwenstein-Wertheim-Rosenberg.

Beginning in 1824, Constantin studied in Freiburg im Breisgau, where he joined the Corps Rhenania Freiburg, in Munich and in Tübingen. He traveled across half of Europe between 1830 and 1832, visiting the Viennese Imperial Court among others.

== Career ==
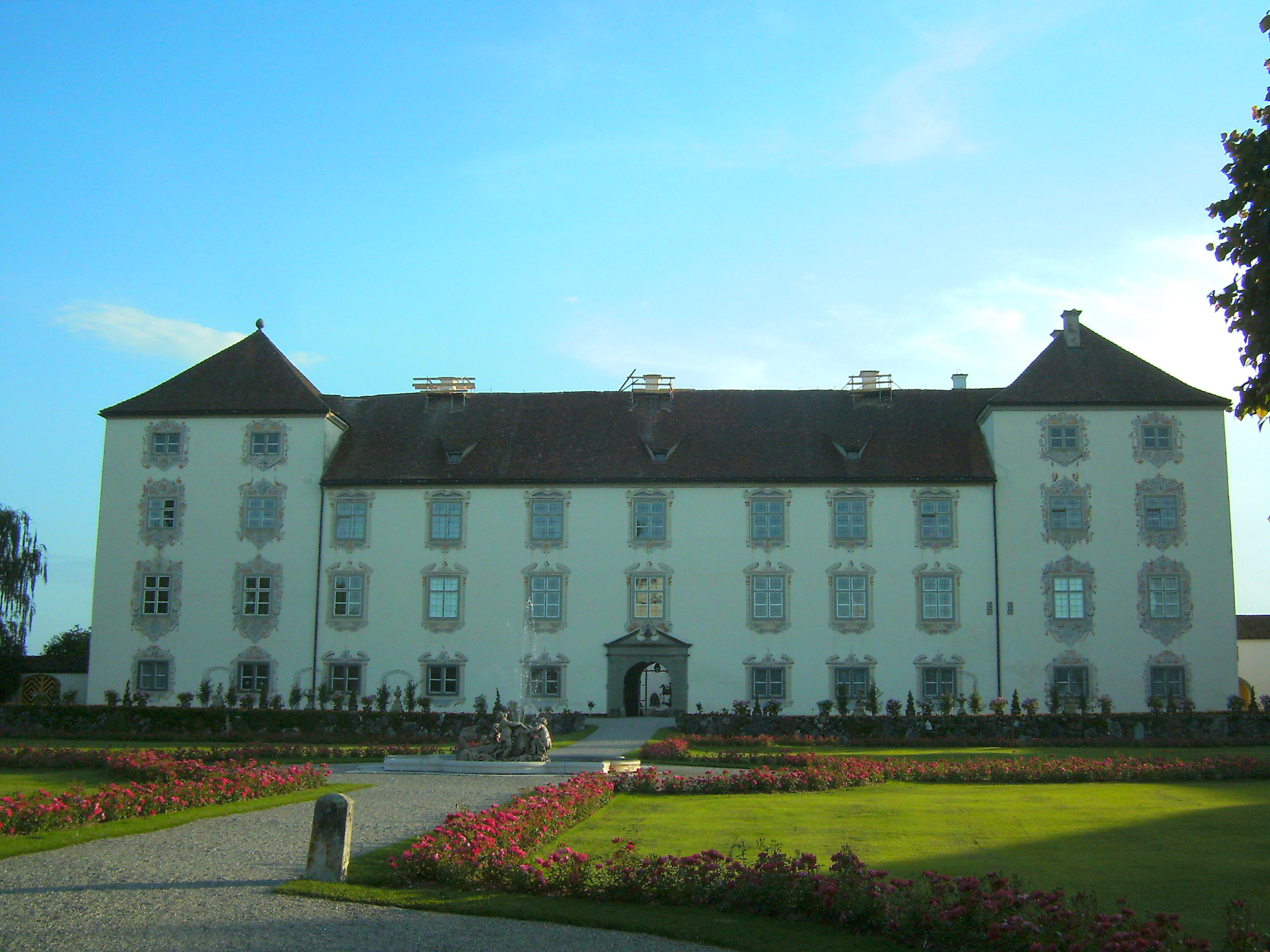
Zeil Castle near Leutkirch

In 1833, as Lord of Zeil Castle, Constantin received the title of Grand Master of the Court (Obersthofmeister) in Württemberg. In the same year, he entered the Chamber of the Standesherren of the Kingdom of Württemberg as a hereditary member, a position he held until 1851, and from 1847 onward served as its vice president.

As early as the 1830s, he was a Catholic resistance leader against the Protestant-dominated Württemberg church policy and published numerous political articles. Upon his father's death in 1845, he inherited the princely title, accompanied by the title "Serene Highness", the title of Hereditary Imperial Councilor of the Crown of Bavaria, and the title of Imperial Steward (Reichserbtruchseß) which had been granted to the head of the family since 1628.

In 1848 he was a member of the Preliminary Parliament. In the elections to the Frankfurt National Assembly on 26 April 1848, he was elected for the Biberach-Leutkirch district to the Revolutionary Parliament in Frankfurt's Paulskirche. In addition to his personal reputation, the decisive factor for his success was probably the fact that he was willing to stand up for the rights of the people in the National Assembly and to renounce all privileges for himself and his class. As a widely visible symbol of his political views, the black, red, and gold flag flew from the Zeil Castle. While the election of a nobleman to the Paulskirche was a minor sensation, his work there was apparently not of particular importance. In the minutes of the proceedings, he is only mentioned in roll call votes, where he consistently voted with the "Left" without, however, joining a faction. Together with the Democrats, he spoke out against the election of the Prussian King Frederick William IV as "Emperor of the Germans". He voted for a moderate burden on peasants when abolishing feudal rights. He also advocated a strict separation of church and state. He is therefore called the "Red Prince." In 1849, he was sentenced to five months' imprisonment in Hohenasperg for insulting state authority due to an article in the Leukircher Wochenblatt.

From 1850 to 1851, he served in the 1st and 3rd "Constitutional Revision State Assembly" of the Kingdom of Württemberg, and was active in state politics on behalf of the People's Party. In 1850, he was sentenced to five months in military prison and fined 200 guilders for lèse majesté and insulting the State Government and the judiciary in an election manifesto. He served his sentence in Hohenasperg Fortress.

== Personal life ==
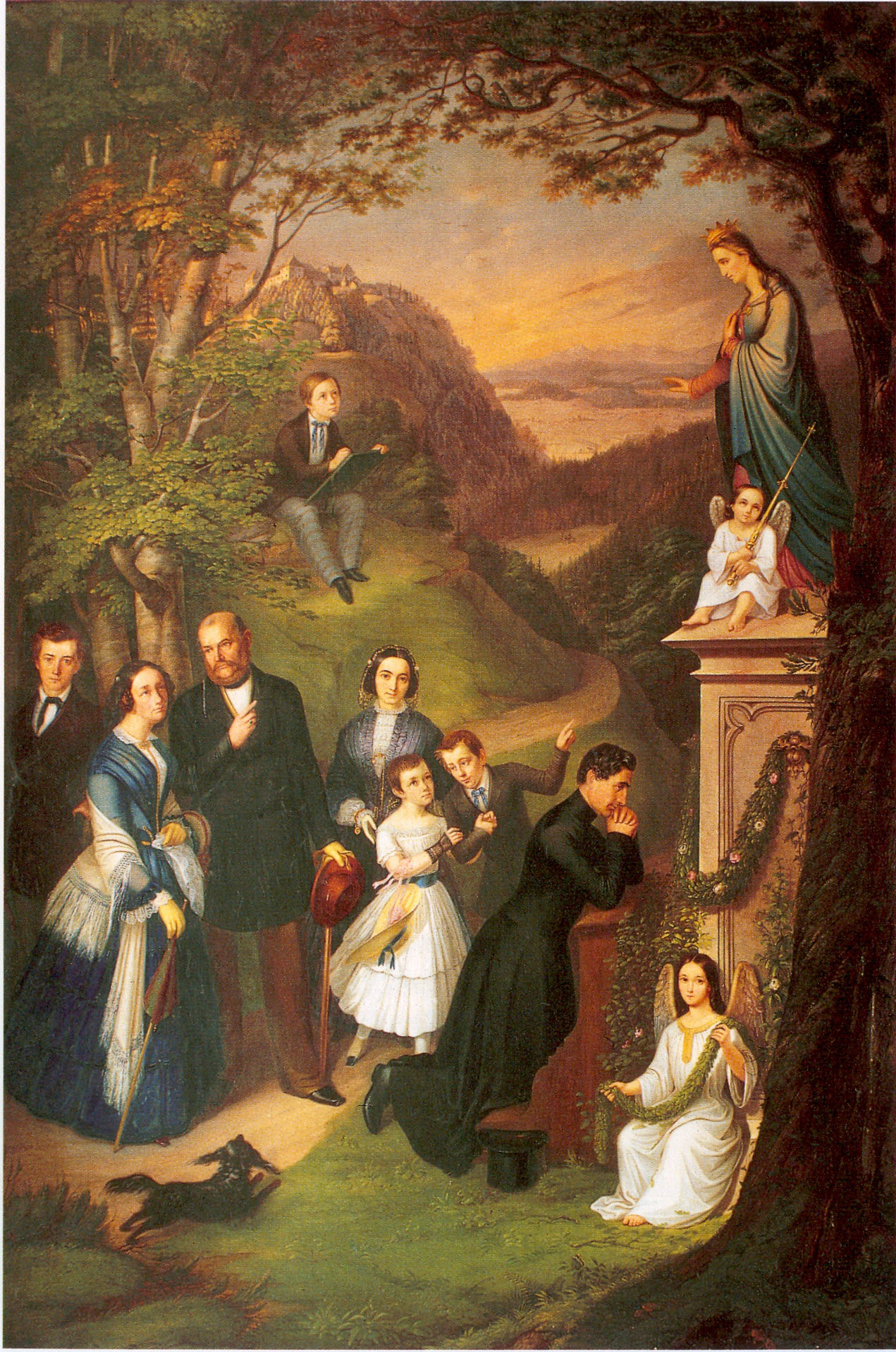
Oil painting of Prince Constantin with his family c. 1850

On 30 September 1833, then Count Constantin was married to Countess Maximiliane von Quadt-Wykrath-Isny (1813–1874), eldest child of Count Wilhelm von Quadt-Wykradt-Isny and Maria Anna, Countess von Thurn-Valsassina. Among her siblings were brothers Count Otto von Quadt-Wykradt-Isny (who married Countess Marie von Schönburg-Forderglauchau, a daughter of Alban von Schönburg-Forderglauchau) and Count Friedrich von Quadt-Wykradt-Isny (who married Countess Marianne of Rechberg and Rothenlöwen). Together, they were the parents of six children:

- Countess Ottolina of Waldburg-Zeil (1834–1842), who died young.
- Wilhelm, 4th Prince of Waldburg-Zeil (1835–1906), who married Countess Maria Josepha von Wolfegg-Waldsee in 1862. After her death in 1885, he married Princess Marie Georgine von Thurn und Taxis in 1889.
- Count Konstantin of Waldburg-Zeil (1839–1905), who married Baroness Ludwina von Hruby-Gelenj, in 1863.
- Countess Alexandrine of Waldburg-Zeil (1840–1840), who died as an infant
- Count Karl of Waldburg-Syrgenstein (1841–1890), who married Countess Sophie von Waldburg-Zeil-Wurzach, in 1875.
- Countess Anna of Waldburg-Zeil (1844–1877), married Baron Nikolaus Rudolf von Enzberg, a son of Baron Leopold von Enzberg and Baroness Luise von Leoprechting, in 1875.

Prince Constantin died on 17 December 1862 in Kenzingen.
