= Wilhelm, 4th Prince of Waldburg-Zeil =

German prince (1835–1906)

Wilhelm
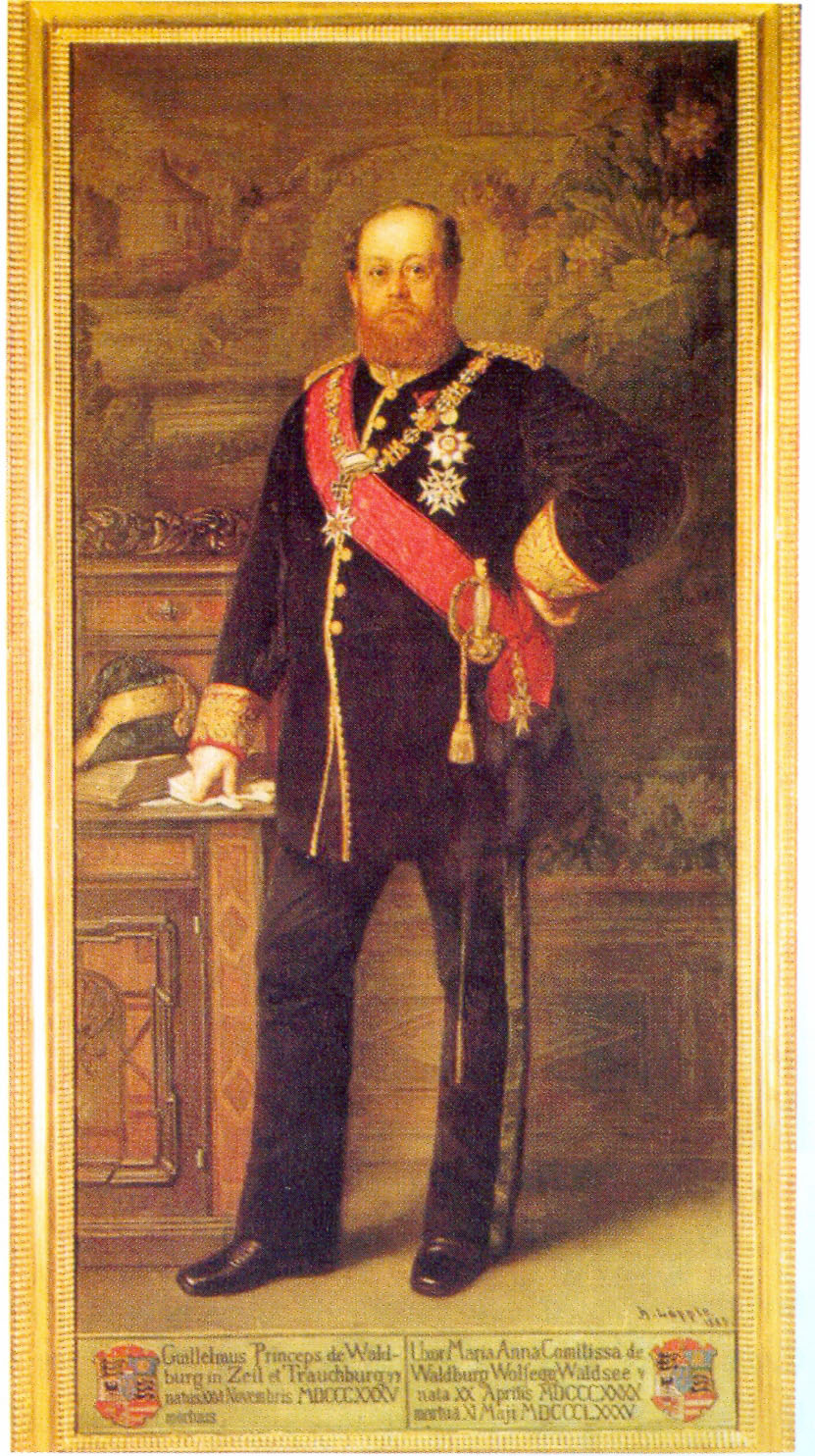

Prince of Waldburg-Zeil-Trauchburg
- Tenure: 17 December 1862 – 20 July 1906
- Predecessor: Constantin
- Successor: Georg
- Born: 26 November 1835; Isny im Allgäu
- Died: 20 July 1906 (aged 70); Zeil Castle
- Spouse: Countess Maria Josepha von Wolfegg-Waldsee (m. 1862; died 1885) Princess Marie Georgine von Thurn und Taxis (m. 1889)
- Issue: Count Georg of Waldburg-Zeil; Georg, 5th Prince of Walburg-Zeil; Count Willibald of Waldburg-Zeil; Count Anton of Waldburg-Zeil; Count Konstantin of Waldburg-Zeil
Names
- Wilhelm Franz Maria Christian von Waldburg zu Zeil und Trauchburg
- House: Waldburg-Zeil
- Father: Constantin, 3rd Prince of Waldburg-Zeil
- Mother: Countess Maximiliane von Quadt-Wykrath-Isny

Constantin Maximilian, 3rd Prince of Waldburg-Zeil-Trauchburg (26 November 1835 – 20 July 1906) was a Royal Württemberg Standesherr, Royal Bavarian Imperial Councillor, Landlord in Baden and member of the Frankfurt National Assembly.

== Early life ==
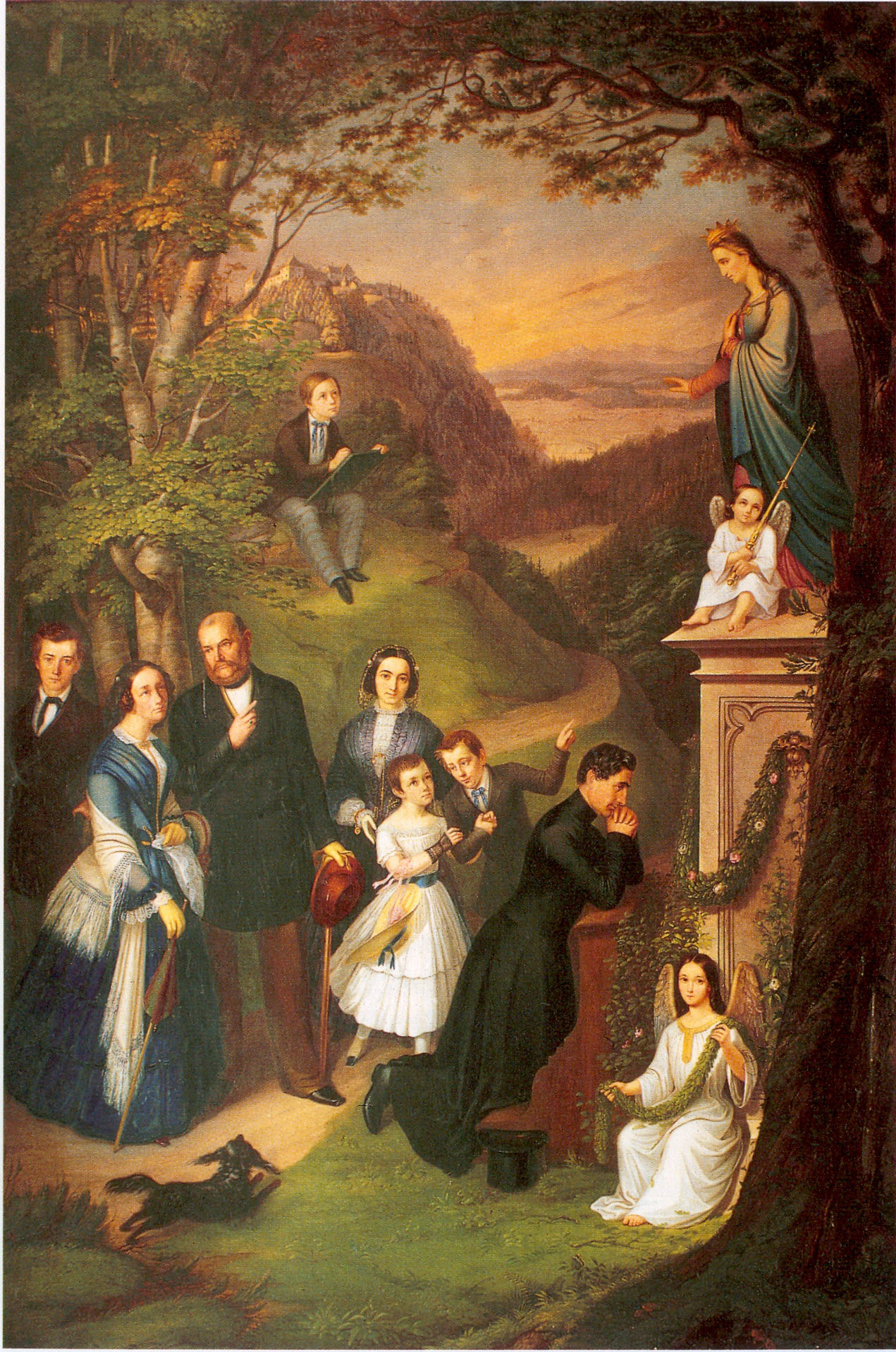
Oil painting of Prince Wilhelm with his family c. 1850

Constantin was born on 26 November 1835 at Neutrauchburg Castle in Isny im Allgäu. He was the eldest son of Constantin, 3rd Prince of Waldburg-Zeil and Countess Maximiliane von Quadt-Wykrath-Isny (1813–1874). Among his siblings were Count Konstantin of Waldburg-Zeil (who married Baroness Ludwina von Hruby-Gelenj); Count Karl of Waldburg-Syrgenstein (who married Countess Sophie von Waldburg-Zeil-Wurzach); and Countess Anna of Waldburg-Zeil (who married Baron Nikolaus Rudolf von Enzberg).

His paternal grandparents were Franz, 2nd Prince of Waldburg-Zeil-Trauchburg and Princess Christiane of Löwenstein-Wertheim-Rosenberg (a daughter of Dominic Constantine, Prince of Löwenstein-Wertheim-Rochefort). His maternal grandparents were Count Wilhelm von Quadt-Wykradt-Isny and Countess Maria Anna von Thurn-Valsassina. Among his maternal family was uncle Count Friedrich von Quadt-Wykradt-Isny (who married Countess Marianne of Rechberg and Rothenlöwen).

Wilhelm initially attended the University of Freiburg, the University of Paris, and the Ludwig-Maximilians-Universität München before attending the Hohenheim Agricultural Academy to study agriculture and forestry.

== Career ==
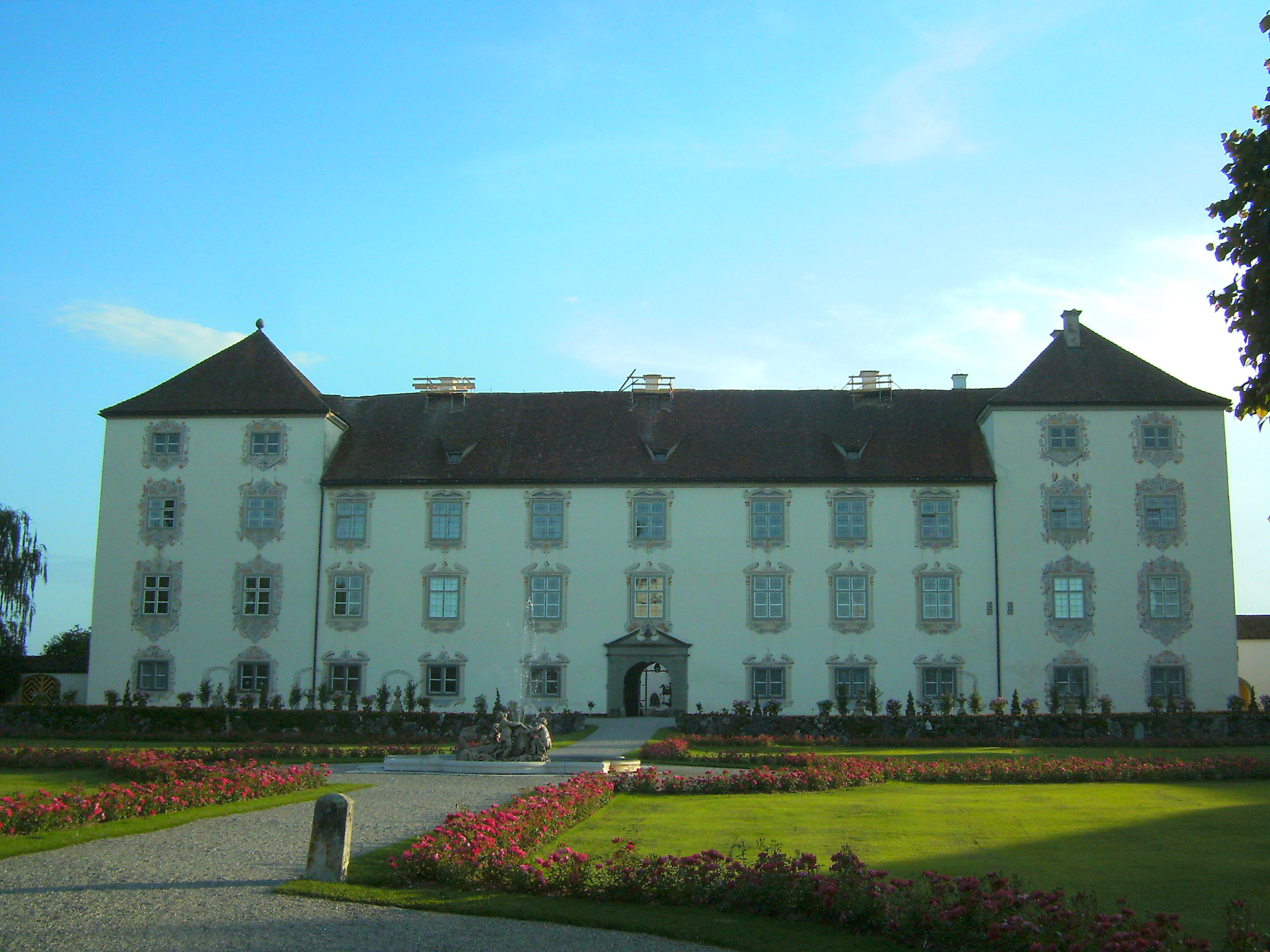
Zeil Castle near Leutkirch

From 1859 to 1860 he was attaché at the Royal Bavarian Embassy to the Kingdom of Hanover. From 1861 he acted as his father's deputy in the Chamber of the Estates of Württemberg. After his father's death in 1862, he served as a hereditary member of this First Chamber of the Estates of Württemberg until his own death in 1906.

Prince Wilhelm was also a member of the Chamber of Imperial Councillors of the Crown of Bavaria. During the Austro-Prussian War of 1866 and the Franco-Prussian War from 1870 to 1871, he was active in the organization of hospitals and the transport of the wounded.

From 1871 to 1872, he was a member of the German Imperial Party in the first Reichstag. He won his seat in the constituency of Württemberg (Biberach, Leutkirch, Waldsee, Wangen). At the beginning of 1872, he resigned his seat as a member of the Reichstag. From 1872 to 1899, he was President of the First Chamber of the Estates of Württemberg. From 1899, due to his poor health, he was represented in the state parliament by his son, Hereditary Count Georg. After the line of Waldburg zu Zeil und Wurzach died out with the death of Prince Eberhard II in 1903, Wilhelm bore the title of Prince of Waldburg-Zeil-Trauchburg-Wurzach.

== Personal life ==
On 24 February 1862 in Wolfegg, shortly before his father's death, then Count Wilhelm was married to Countess Maria Josepha von Wolfegg-Waldsee (1840–1885), a daughter of Friedrich, 2nd Prince of Waldburg-Wolfegg-Waldsee, and Countess Elisabeth von Königsegg-Aulendorf. Before her death in 1885, they were the parents of:

- Count Georg of Waldburg-Zeil (1866–1866), who died in infancy.
- Georg, 5th Prince of Walburg-Zeil-Trauchburg-Wurzach (1867–1918), who was killed at Allaines in Péronne; he married Countess Marie Therese of Salm-Reifferscheidt-Raitz, a daughter of Count Erich of Salm-Reifferscheidt-Raitz (youngest son of Hugo, 2nd Prince of Salm-Reifferscheidt-Raitz) in 1897.
- Count Willibald Friedrich of Waldburg-Zeil (1871–1947), who entered into two morganatic marriages and, therefore, had to renounce his princely title; he married Babette Brunn, (née Jirask) in 1900.
- Count Anton of Waldburg-Zeil (1873–1948), who married Countess Maria Immakulata von Beroldingen, a daughter of Count Franz von Beroldingen and Maria von Handel, in 1902.
- Count Konstantin of Waldburg-Zeil (1874–1935)

After her death in 1885, he married Princess Marie Georgine von Thurn und Taxis (1857–1909) in 1889. She was the youngest child of Maximilian Karl, 6th Prince of Thurn and Taxis, and Princess Mathilde Sophie of Oettingen-Spielberg. Together, they were the parents of one son:

- Count Wilhelm Karl of Waldburg-Zeil (1890–1927), who married Countess Marie-Therese of Salm-Reifferscheidt-Raitz, a daughter of Count August of Salm-Reifferscheidt-Raitz (son of Count Erich of Salm-Reifferscheidt-Raitz) and Baroness Gabriella Perényi de Perény (sister to Baron Zsigmond Perényi).

Prince Wilhelm died at Zeil Castle on 20 July 1906. His widow died in Munich on 13 February 1909.
