= Carl Ernst Fürst Fugger von Glött =

German jurist and banker (1859–1940)

- President of the imperial council of the crown of Bavaria, royal colonel marshal
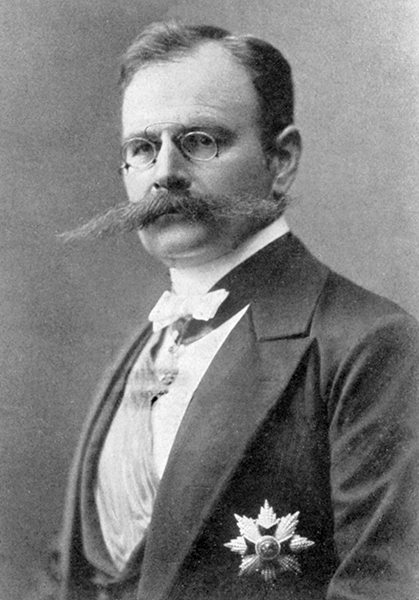
- Carl Ernst Fürst Fugger von Glött 1909
- Born: 2 July 1859; Oberndorf am Lech
- Died: 25 April 1940 (aged 80); Kirchheim in Schwaben
- Buried: Kirchheim in Schwaben
- Noble family: Fugger
- Father: Ernst Graf Fugger von Glött
- Mother: Maria Luise Alexandra, Freiin von Künsberg
- Occupation: Jurist, banker

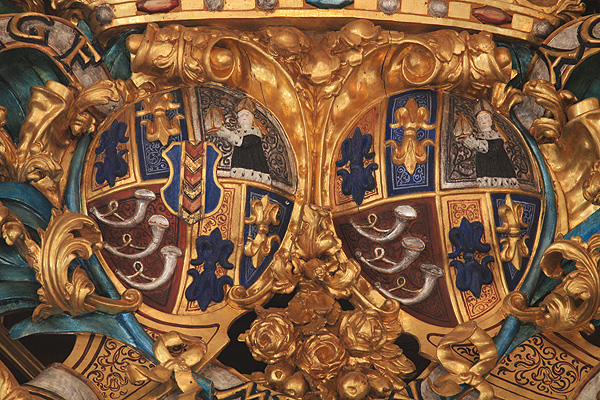
Coat of Arms

Graf Carl Ernst Maria Fidel Alfred Anton Fugger von Glött, since 1914: Fürst Fugger von Glött (2 July 1859, Oberndorf am Lech – 25 April 1940, Kirchheim in Schwaben) was a member of the noble family of the Fugger. He was a jurist, president of the imperial council of the crown of Bavaria and royal colonel marshal of the Kingdom of Bavaria. Furthermore, he was Lord of Kirchheim in Schwaben, Lord of Oberndorf and Count of Kirchberg and Weißenhorn.

== Early life ==
Carl Ernst Fürst Fugger von Glött was the oldest of seven children and one of four sons of Ernst Graf Fugger von Glött, Lord of Oberndorf and Lord of Kirchheim (1821–1885) and Maria Luise Alexandra, Freiin von Künsberg (1834–1901).

He visited the clerical residential schools in Metten und Feldkirch/Vorarlberg and studied laws at the universities Munich, Würzburg and Erlangen.

== Career ==
As a jurist he was working in Donauwörth, Passau, Bamberg and Lindau. From 2 October 1891 to 1918 he was as a hereditable (formerly corporative) imperial counselor member of the imperial council (ger. Reichsrat) of the crown of Bavaria and from 1911 to the end of the Kingdom of Bavaria in 1918 president of the imperial council (ger. Reichsrat) of the crown of Bavaria. Together with count Georg von Hertling and count Maximilian von Soden-Fraunhofen he had a crucial share in the proclamation of Ludwig III to be the king. On 30 December 1913 he was awarded the hereditable rank of a prince (ger. Fürst) for his merits for the Kingdom of Bavaria.

As a confident Catholic he had the heraldic motto 'God and Mary'. In 1901 he was awarded for his charitable work by Pope Leo XIII with the grand cross of the Order of St. Gregory the Great. Since 1904 he has been honorary citizen of Kirchheim in Schwaben because of his charitable and cultural merits, especially for public education. He had also an important role in the implementation of the railway line Pfaffenhausen-Kirchheim.

On 9 May 1918 he was appointed to be royal colonel marshal of the Kingdom of Bavaria. But he could hold this position only until November 1918 because of the end of the monarchy by the November Revolution.

From 1922 to 1938 he was supervisory board member of the Bayerische Hypotheken- und Wechselbank, which opposed the Nazi dictatorship. From 1931 to 1938 he had the position of the chairman of the supervisory board of the bank.

== Personal life ==
On 1 November 1891, he married in Moss, near Lindau, to Countess Elisabeth of Quadt-Wykradt-Isny (1862–1940), the daughter of Count Friedrich von Quadt-Wykradt-Isny. With her he had three children:

- Anna Friederike Elisabeth Maria, Countess Fugger von Glött (1893–1962)
- Maria Countess Fugger von Glött (1894–1935)
- Joseph-Ernst Graf Fugger von Glött (1895–1981).

Carl Ernst Fürst Fugger von Glött died on 25 April 1940 in Kirchheim in Schwaben and is buried there.

== Orders and decorations ==
- Kingdom of Bavaria:
  - Grand Cross of the Order of Merit of the Bavarian Crown, 1906
  - Knight of the Royal Order of St. Hubert. 1912
- Holy See: Grand Cross of the Order of St. Gregory the Great, 1901

== Notes/Further reading ==
- Bosl, Karl (Hg.): Bosls Bayerische Biographie: 8000 Persönlichkeiten aus 15 Jahrhunderten. Regensburg 1983; Ergänzungsband 1988.

== See also ==
- Fugger
- Kirchheim in Schwaben
