= Westerbach =

Westerbach may refer to:

- Westerbach (Hasel), a river in Bavaria, Germany, tributary of the Hasel
- Westerbach (Kahl), a river in Bavaria, Germany, tributary of the Kahl
