= Westerbach (Hasel) =

River in Bavaria, Germany

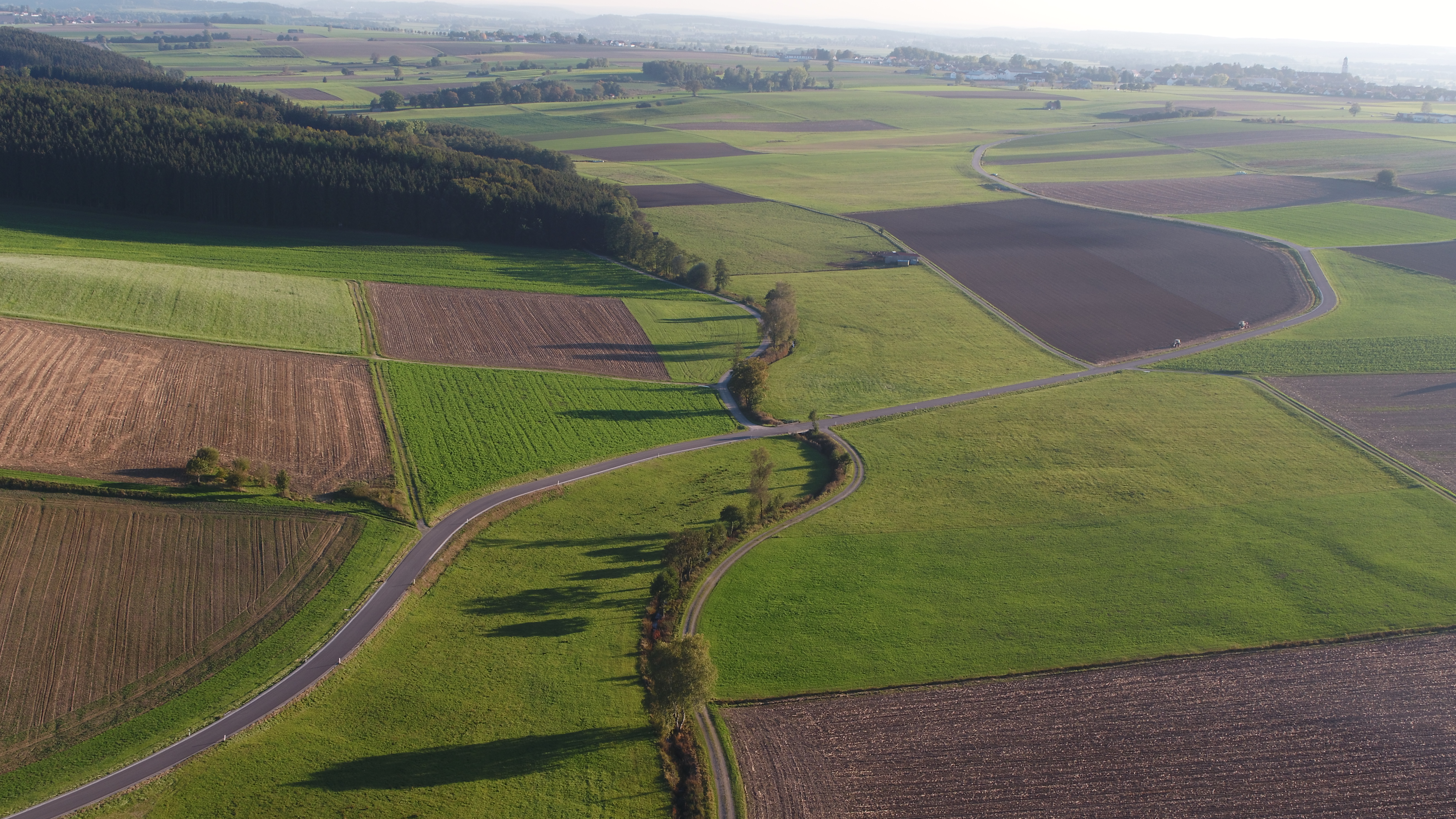
- The Westerbach at Eppishausen

Location
- Country: Germany
- State: Bavaria

Physical characteristics
- Source
  - location: mouth_location = Hasel
- Mouth
  - coordinates: 48.2056°N 10.5036°E
- Length: 13.4 km (8.3 mi)

Basin features
- Progression: Hasel→ Mindel→ Danube→ Black Sea

Westerbach (German pronunciation: [ˈvɛstɐbax]) is a river of Bavaria, Germany. It is a left tributary of the Hasel near Eppishausen.

== See also ==
- List of rivers of Bavaria
