= Könghausen =

- Ortsteil of Eppishausen
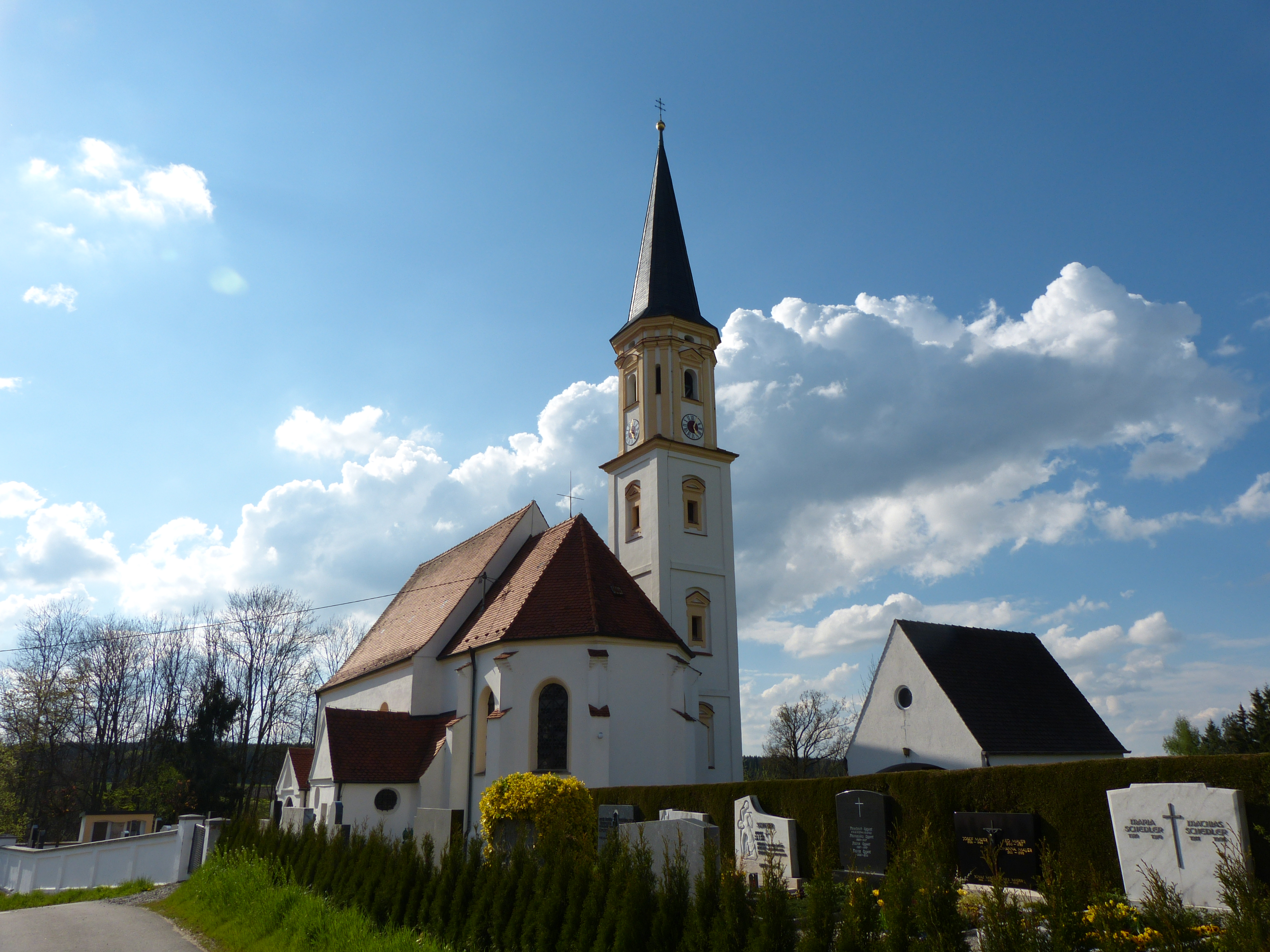
- Parish church of St. John the Baptist
- Interactive map of Könghausen
- Location within Germany Location within Bavaria
- Coordinates: 48.1877°N 10.5678°E
- Country: Germany
- State: Bavaria
- Municipality: Eppishausen
- Elevation: 554 m (1,818 ft)
- Time zone: UTC+01:00 (CET)
  - Summer (DST): UTC+02:00 (CEST)
- Postal codes: 87746
- Dialling codes: 08266

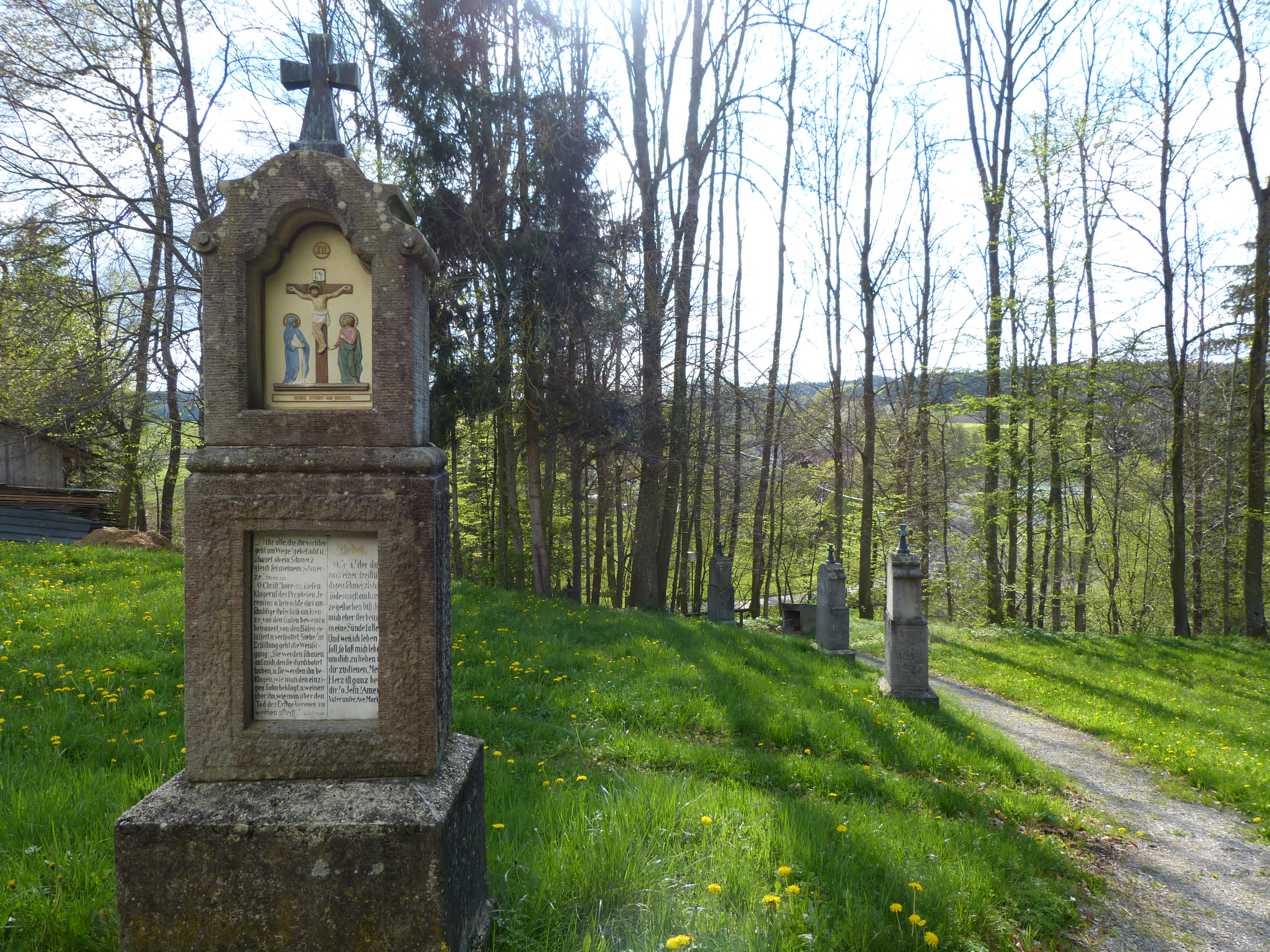
Kreuzweg

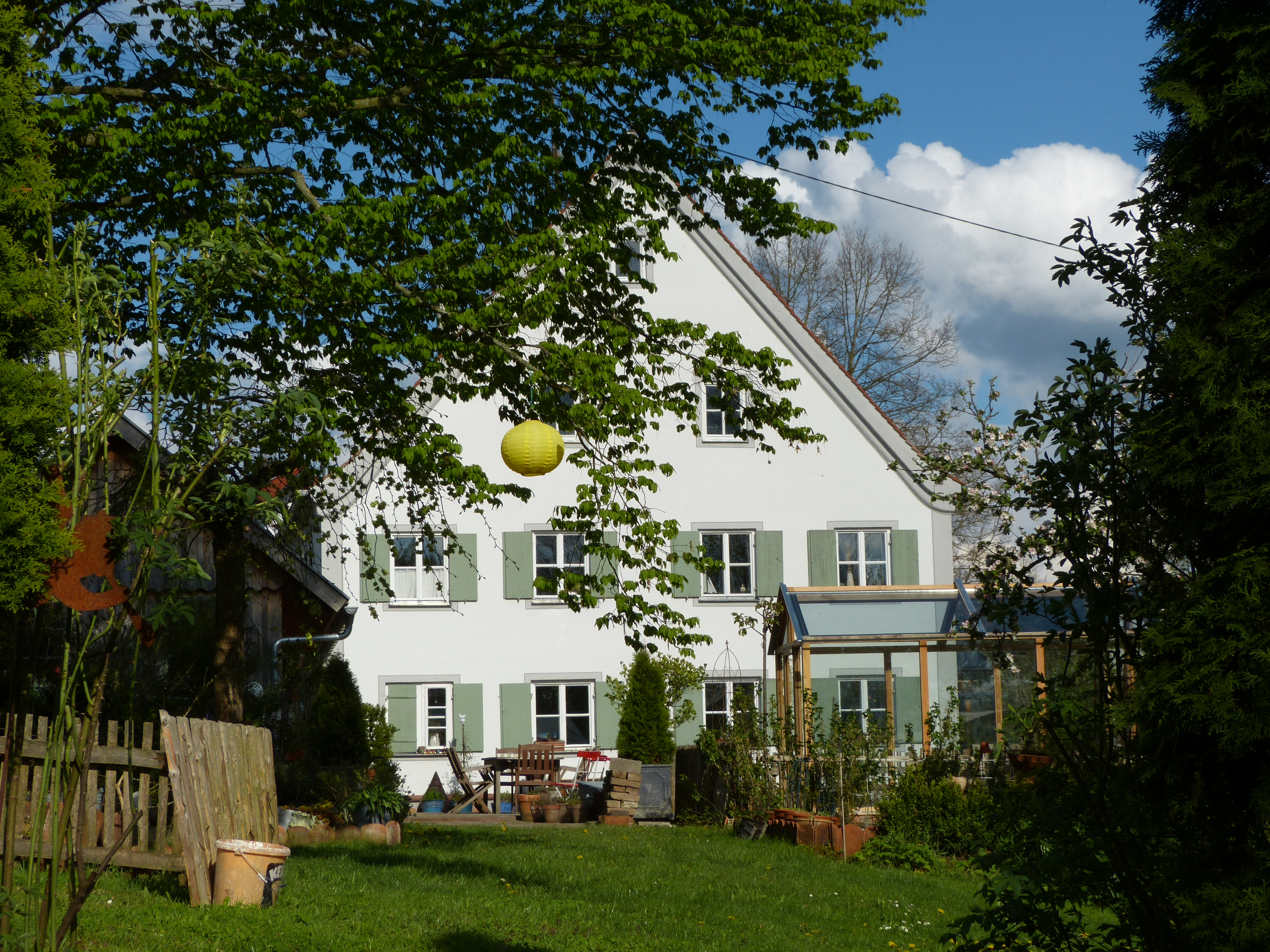
Denkmalgeschütztes Pfarrhaus

Könghausen is a village in the Upper Swabian municipality of Eppishausen in Unterallgäu.

== Geography ==
The Parish village of Könghausen is four kilometers northeast of the main town of Eppishausen, with which it is connected by the District road MN 3. The State Road 2027 leads through the village, which leads to Obergessertshausen in the north and Mittelneufnach in the southeast. Furthermore, the District road MN 23 begins in the center of the village and leads to Immelstetten and Markt Wald in the south.

== History ==
It was founded in the late 11th century as Kenginshuosin, and since its first historical records it has been renamed several times.

== Incorporation ==
The formerly independent municipality of Könghausen included the districts Aufhof, Ellenried, Klenkerhof, Lutzenberg and Weißenhof. The entire municipality was incorporated into the municipality of Eppishausen in the course of the territorial reforms of Bavaria in 1972.

== Notes ==
- Hermann Haisch, ed. (1987), Landkreis Unterallgäu (in German), Memmingen: Memminger Zeitung Verlagsdruckerei, p. 982, ISBN 3980064921
