= Kirchheim in Schwaben =

Kirchheim i.Schw.
- Municipality
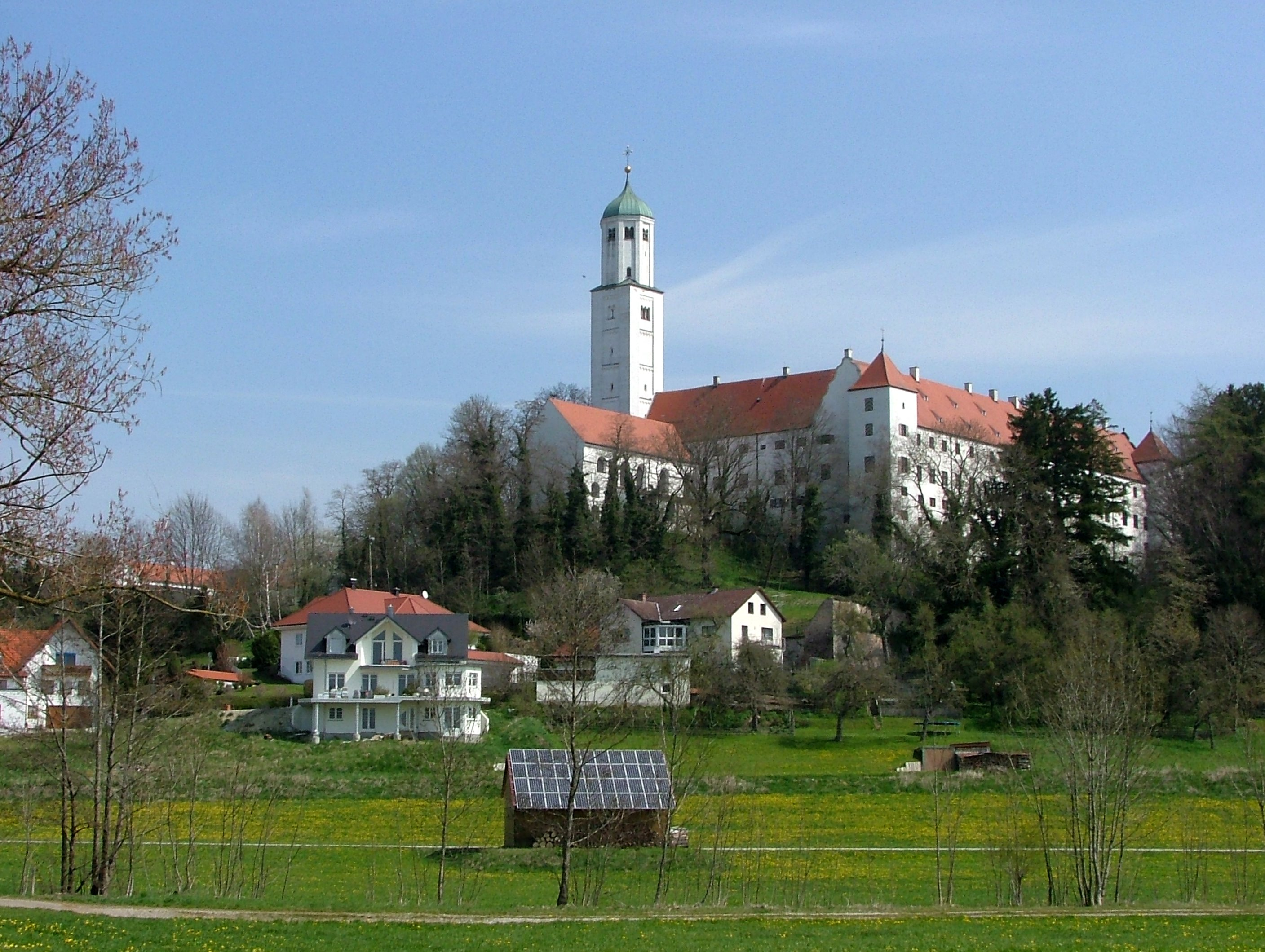
- Fugger castle at Kirchheim

- Coat of arms

- Location of Kirchheim i.Schw. within Unterallgäu district
- Interactive map of Kirchheim i.Schw.
- Location within Germany Location within Bavaria
- Coordinates: 48°10.36′N 10°28.53′E
- Country: Germany
- State: Bavaria
- Admin. region: Schwaben
- District: Unterallgäu
- Municipal assoc.: Kirchheim in Schwaben
- Subdivisions: 4 Ortsteile

Government
  - Mayor (2020–26): Susanne Fischer

Area
  - Total: 31.95 km^{2} (12.34 sq mi)
- Elevation: 581 m (1,906 ft)

Population (2025-12-31)
  - Total: 2,528
  - Density: 79.12/km^{2} (204.9/sq mi)
- Time zone: UTC+01:00 (CET)
  - Summer (DST): UTC+02:00 (CEST)
- Postal codes: 87757
- Dialling codes: 08266
- Vehicle registration: MN
- Website: www.kirchheim- schwaben.de

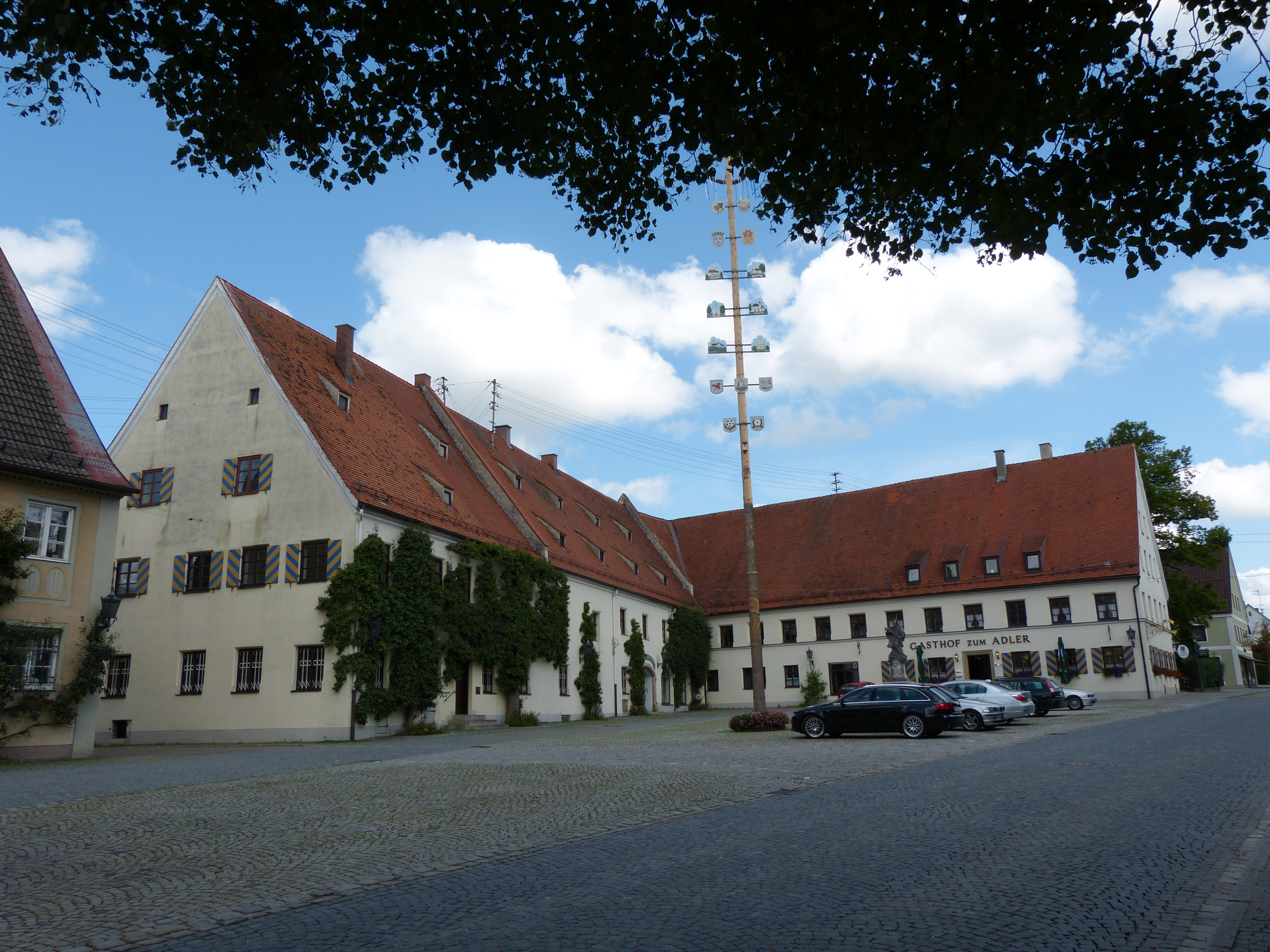
market place

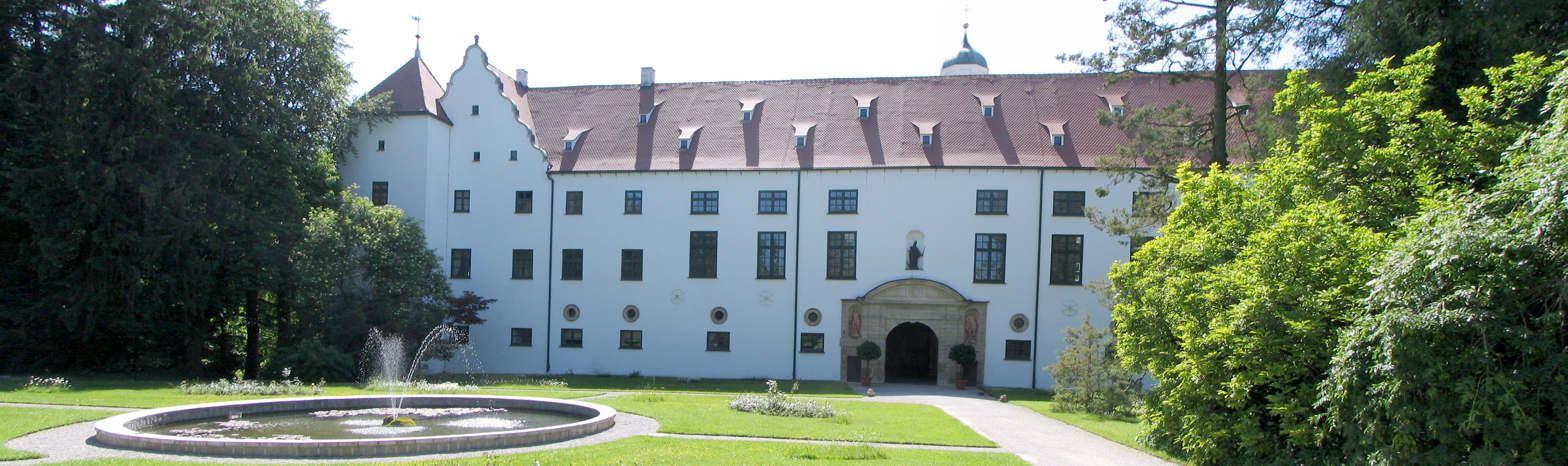
Fugger castle garden side

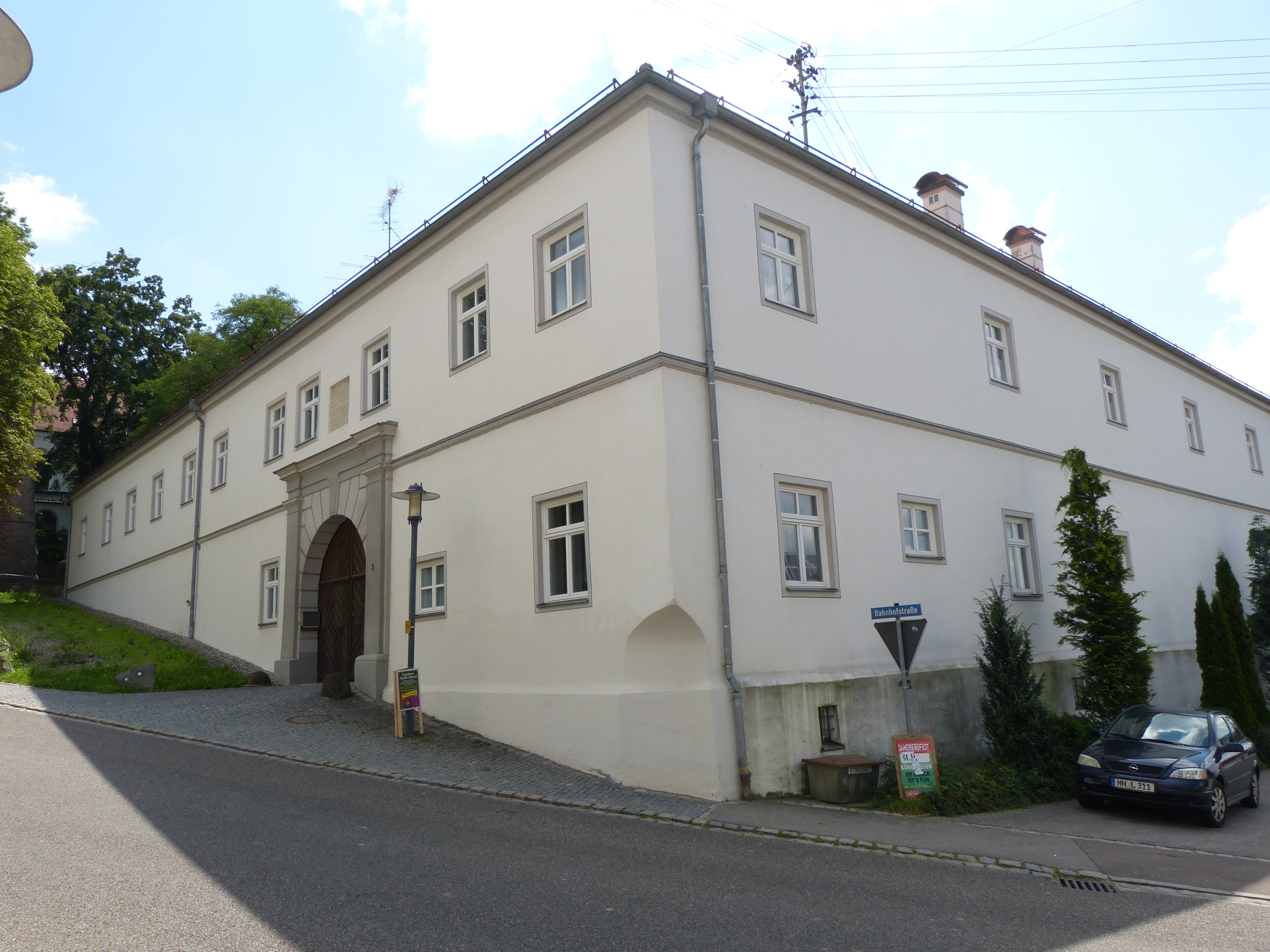
Former Dominican friary below the church and castle

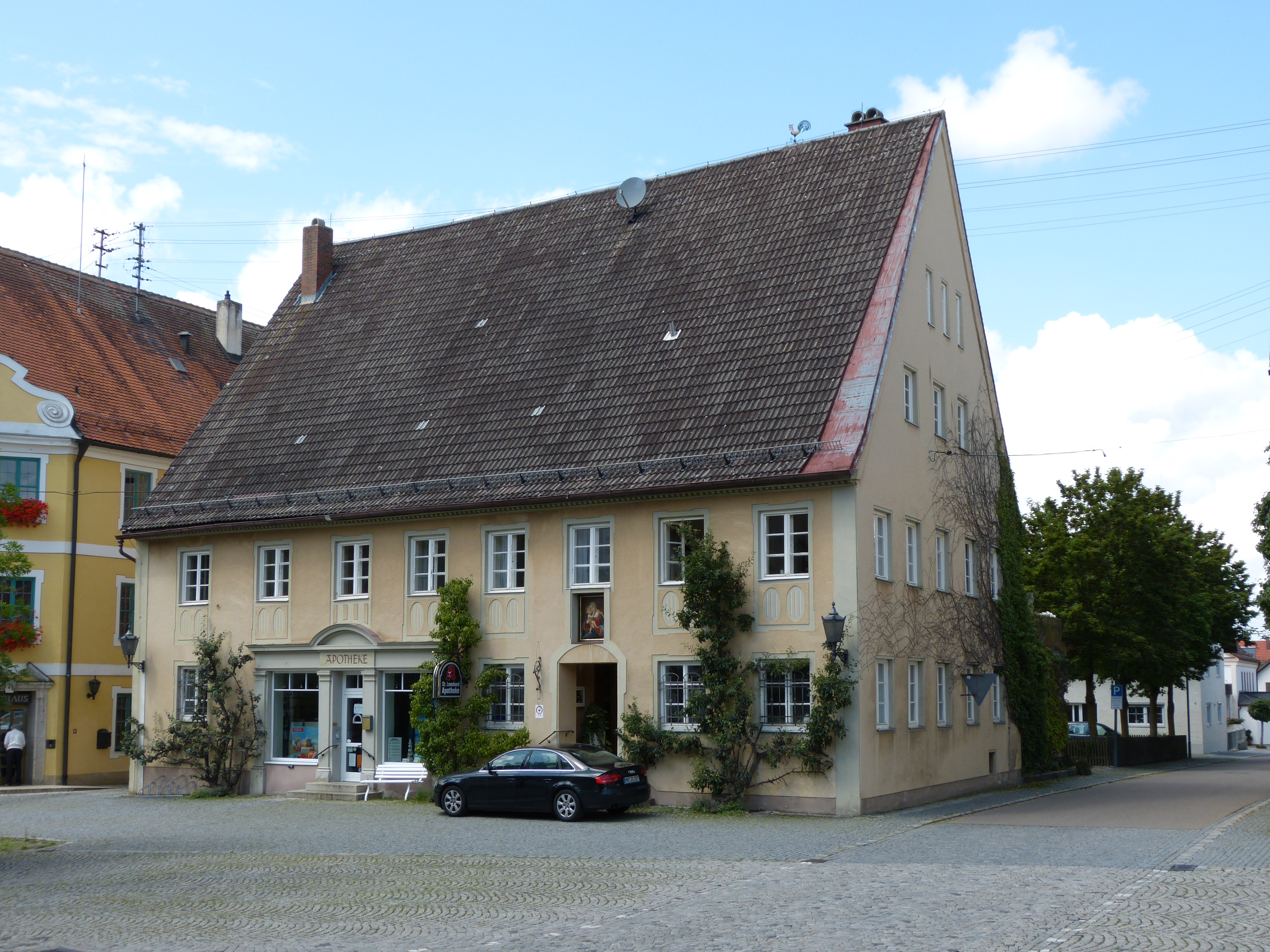
Pharmacy at the market place

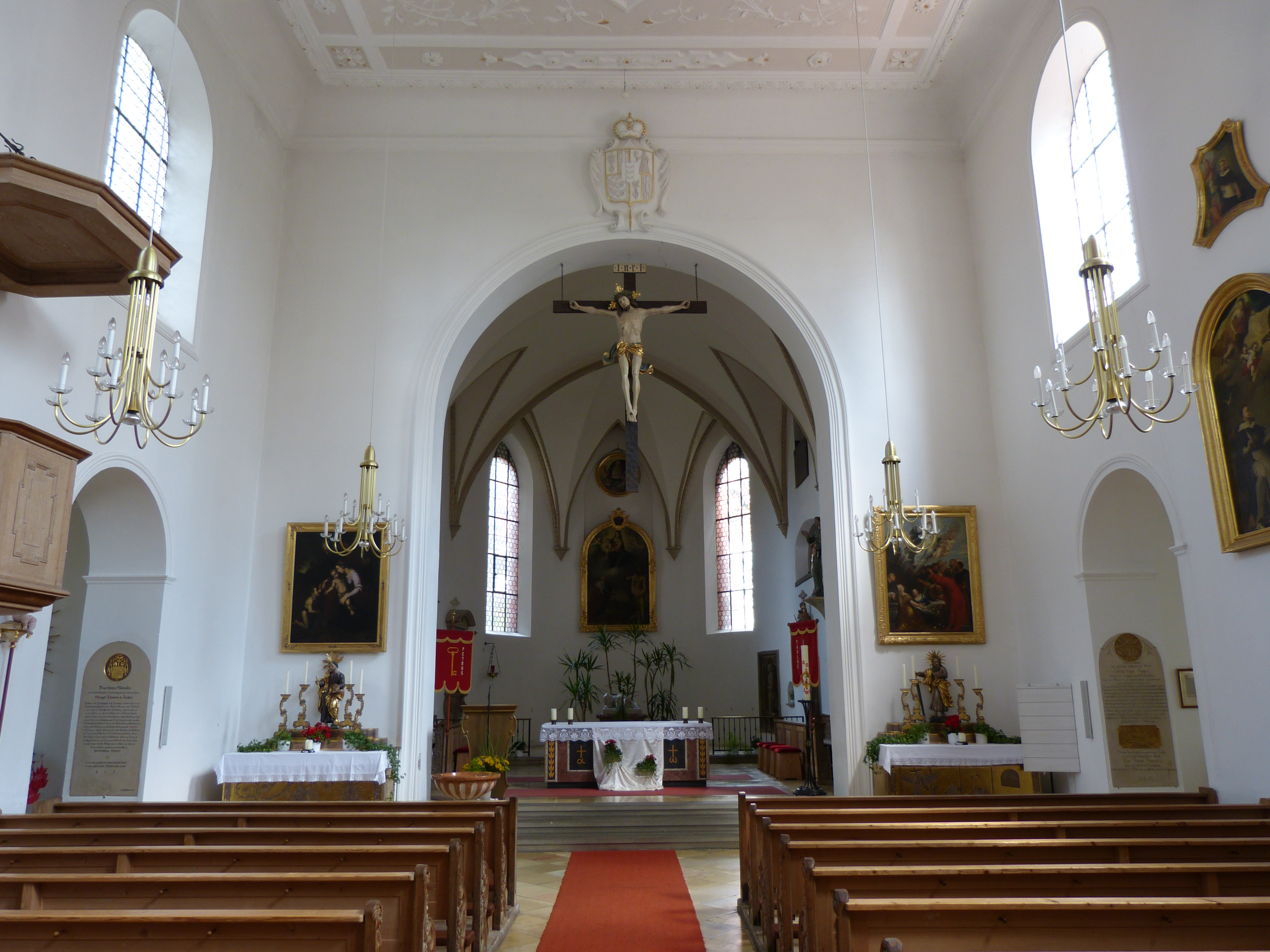
Church St. Peter and Paul

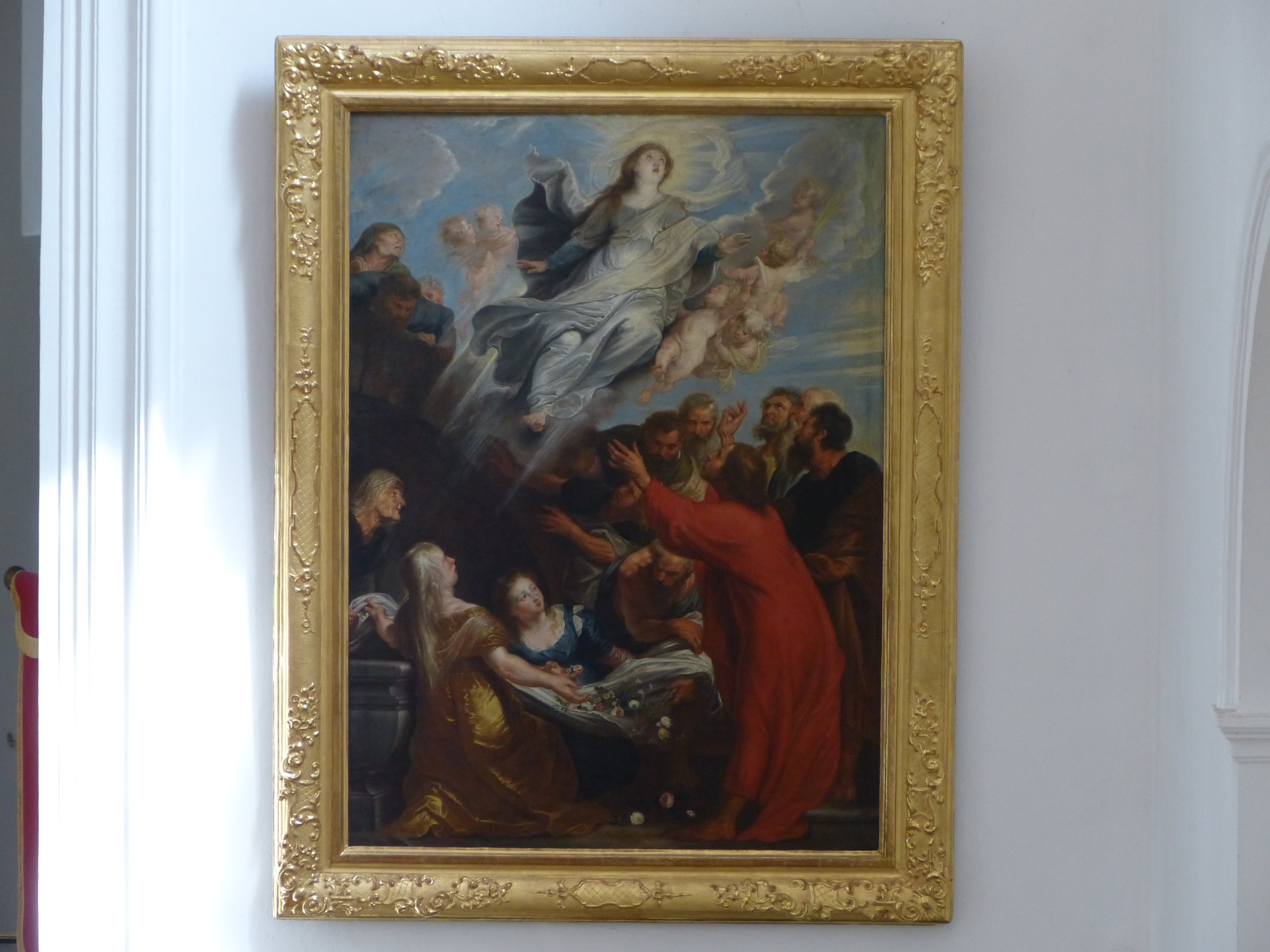
Ascension of Mary, painting by Peter Paul Rubens in the church

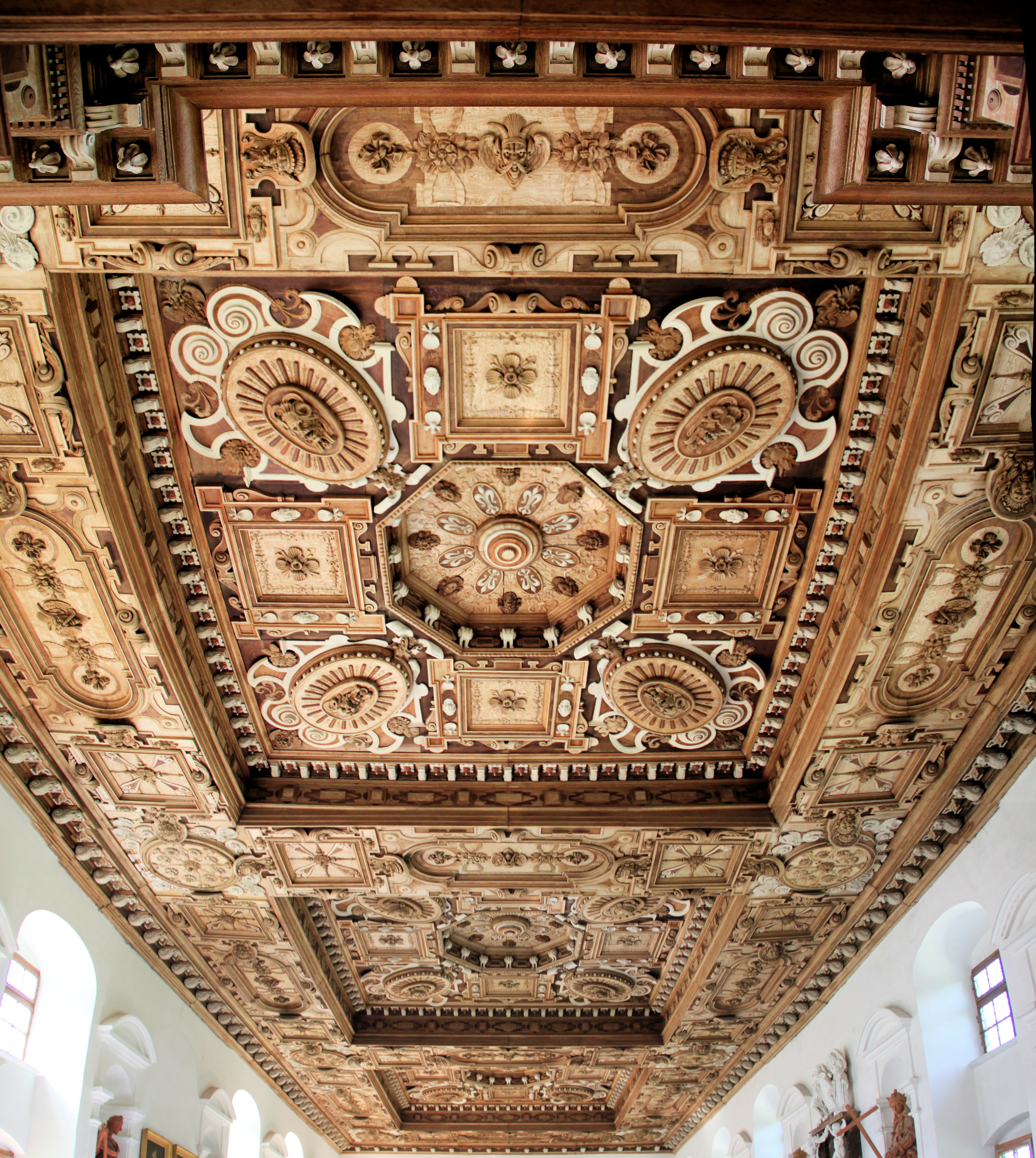
Coffered ceiling in cedar hall

Kirchheim or Kirchheim in Schwaben (German pronunciation: [ˈkɪʁçhaɪm ʔɪn ˈʃvaːbn̩], lit. 'Kirchheim in Swabia') is a municipality and a market town in the district of Unterallgäu in the region of Swabia (Schwaben) in the south-west of Bavaria, Germany. The town was greatly influenced by the Fugger family. North-east of the town lies the Augsburg Western Woods Nature Park.

Besides the town of Kirchheim, the municipality encompasses the villages of Derndorf, Hasberg, Spöck und Tiefenried. The town has a municipal association with Eppishausen of which it is the capital and place of administration.

The town lies 38 kilometres (24 mi) south-west of Augsburg, 80 kilometres (50 mi) west of Munich.

== History ==
=== Early history ===
Kirchheim's History already begins 8000 BC in the Stone Age with the first traces of hunter-gatherers. In the Bronze Age around 1800 BC the first larger settlement was founded with around 15 homesteads. After the Romans the Alemanni were settling in the town and were establishing the name Kirchheim (German "Heim bei der Kirche", English "home at the church").

=== Middle Ages and Renaissance ===
In the Middle Ages the dominion of Kirchheim first was a crown land of the king. The first mention in a document was 1067. Between the 8th and 10th century it was given away to the bishops auf Augsburg. The bishops gave it as a fief to different aristocratic families. 1343 Holy Roman Emperor Louis IV gave Kirchheim high justice. Kirchheim was burned to the ground in July 1372 because of a dispute between its feudal lord and the city of Augsburg over custom laws on the lech river. Also in the War of the cities 1387–1389 the town had to take heavy damages. Kirchheim was vested with market rights 1490 by Holy Roman Emperor Frederick III which stimulated economic growth. In the German Peasants' War the town and castle was sacked on 7. May 1525. Knight Hans Walther von Hürnheim was awarded for his merits for Kaiser and empire 1544 with coat of arms and seal for Kirchheim by Holy Roman Emperor Charles V himself.

The dominion of Kirchheim was 1551 sold to Anton Fugger. Hans Fugger from 1578 to 1585 erected a glorious renaissance castle instead of the medieval castle complex. The castle was created after the model of the Spanish El Escorial near Madrid with integrated church. 1601 a friary of the Dominican Order was established. An own guild system was founded 1626. When trying to drain the swampy Mindel valley in 1581, the largest plough in the world, pulled by 102 horses, was used. One of the huge ploughshares is preserved in the castle.

=== Modern Europe ===
In the Thirty Years' War Swabia was occupied by the Swedes in 1632. In the beginning Kirchheim could escape depredations by paying danegeld by the Fugger. Swedish chancellor Axel Oxenstierna gave Kirchheim 1633 as a war loot to the Swedish employed general Hohenlohe-Langenburg. The town was sacked and the population was tortured and murdered. The neighbouring Eppishausen was totally burned down. The Swedish withdrew after the total looting in 1635. In 1646 the place was again a theatre of the war between Swedish, Bavarian, imperial and French troops. All of them pressed the people to pay protection money and war costs.

After some of the peasants refused to swear the oath of allegiance to count Joseph Hugo Fugger and after it was tried to be enforced, it came 1785 to the peasant shooting: Three peasants where shot and six deadly wounded.

As a result of the Napoleonic Wars, Kirchheim fell in 1806 to the Kingdom of Bavaria. On 20 June 1861 nearly the whole town burned down in a great fire. Only three days later a hail storm destroyed most of the harvest. The town was newly structured and rebuilt in the years after.

=== 20th and 21st centuries ===
During the First World War, soldiers from Kirchheim were mainly deployed on the western front. In the end there were 77 dead and missing. In World War II the town was occupied on 27 April 1945 by US tank units of the 7th US Army. Because of the war, the town had 96 dead and missing citizens.

Count Joseph-Ernst Graf Fugger von Glött was a supporter of the 20 July plot to assassinate Hitler and later a politician and founder of the Christian Social Union of Bavaria, for which he was a representative in the German Bundestag and the Landtag of Bavaria. He established regular meetings of the bavarian delegates of the Bundestag of his party in Kirchheim. The there proclaimed Kirchheimer resolutions were determining for German and bavarian politics.

The castle's Cedar Hall (Zedernsaal), finished in 1585, has a carved wooden ceiling by the Augsburg cabinetmaker Wendel Dietrich.

=== Population development ===
population of the market town Kirchheim in Swabia 1840-2012
year	1840	1871	1900	1925	1939	1950	1961	1970	1987	2002	2003	2004	2005	2006	2007	2008	2009	2010	2011	2012
residents	1.834	1.802	1.939	2.256	2.149	3.274	2.425	2.376	2.403	2.571	2.567	2.544	2.517	2.505	2.480	2.483	2.489	2.444	2.548	2.545

== Culture and places of interest ==
Kirchheim has a rich cultural heritage. Most famous is the large fugger castle, built after the model of the Spanish El Escorial near Madrid with the attached castle and parish church St. Peter and Paul. In it the prominent painting Assumption of Mary of Peter Paul Rubens is located on the southern side altar. Other paintings are of Domenichino und Padovini. Inside the church is the table tomb of Hans Fugger made by Hubert Gerhard and Alexander Colyn, which is regarded to be an outstanding artwork of sculpture of the renaissance in south Germany. The cedar hall inside the castle has the most beautiful carved ceiling of the Renaissance north of the alps and is said to have the best acoustics in Europe. Other places of interest include the museum of local history inside the historic town hall and the statue of St. Nepomuk on the market square.

== Economy and infrastructure ==
=== Local companies ===
- Wanzl Metallwarenfabrik: metal works factory and the world's largest producer of shopping carts
- Franz Wolf GmbH: internationally active producer of precision parts with die casting
- Max Holzheu Bauunternehmen GmbH and Holzheu Holzbau GmbH: over-regional construction and wood construction companies
- Fa. Schneider Kunststofftechnik GmbH: international company for plastics engineering, specialised in polymer processing at die casting
- Kirchheim has its own electric power generation plant

=== Traffic connections ===
Kirchheim lies on the state road 2037 and on state road 2025 Thannhausen – Kirchheim – Türkheim. Via the state road 2037 and the Bundesstraße 16 it is connected to Bundesautobahn A96 /E54 Lindau – Memmingen – Landsberg am Lech – Munich near Mindelheim, via state road 2025 to Bundesautobahn A8 /E52 Stuttgart – Ulm – Augsburg – Munich at Jettingen-Scheppach and in Memmingen to the Bundesautobahn A7. Train stations are in Pfaffenhausen and Mindelheim. Local public transport is organized in the Transport Association Middleswabia (Verkehrsverbund Mittelschwaben - VVM).

The international airport Memmingen (FMM) is 27 km away, Augsburg Airport (AGB) is in a distance of 43 km.

== Notable people ==
- Angelus Dreher (1741–1809), composer and Dominican friar
- Carl Ernst Fürst Fugger von Glött (1859–1940), president of the imperial council of the crown of Bavaria, royal colonel marshal
- Joseph-Ernst Graf Fugger von Glött (1895–1981), supporter of the 20 July plot to assassinate Hitler, co-founder of the CSU in Mindelheim, delegate in the Bundestag and in the Bavarian Landtag, member of the Council of Europe, deputy chairman of the CSU parliamentary group, county councillor in Mindelheim, chairman of the Swabian collegiate advisory board
- Anna Gräfin Fugger von Glött (1893–1962), artist, benefactress, second federal chairman and diocesan leader of the papal mission of Catholic women in Germany, bearer of the Pro Ecclesia et Pontifice
- Hans Walther von Hürnheim (c. 1500–16 September 1557), knight, royal and imperial councillor, seneschal, colonel of the mercenaries (Landsknechte)
- Johann Pankraz Kober (1796–1832), painter, creator of the interior decoration of many churches in Middle Swabia, father of Joseph Kober
- Joseph Kober (1823–1884), academic painter, one of the most important Swabian church painters of the Nazarene movement
- Johann Jakob Kollmann (1714–1778), city physician in Deggendorf, member of the Bavarian Academy of Science
- Manfred Lochbrunner (born 1945), theologian and dogmatist
- Aemilian Rosengart (1757–1810), composer and monk of the Order of Saint Benedict
- Johann Schuster (1912–1975), politician (WAV, DP)
- Marquard Schwegler, wood carver of Christian art of the 18th century
- Anton Wiedemann (1865–1945), historical researcher and chronicler of the town
- Gregor Thomas Ziegler (1770–1852), bishop of Tyniec and Linz and benedictine monk, court chaplain of St. Stefan in Vienna, inventor of the pastoral letters and the popular missions
