= Hasel (Mindel) =

River in Germany

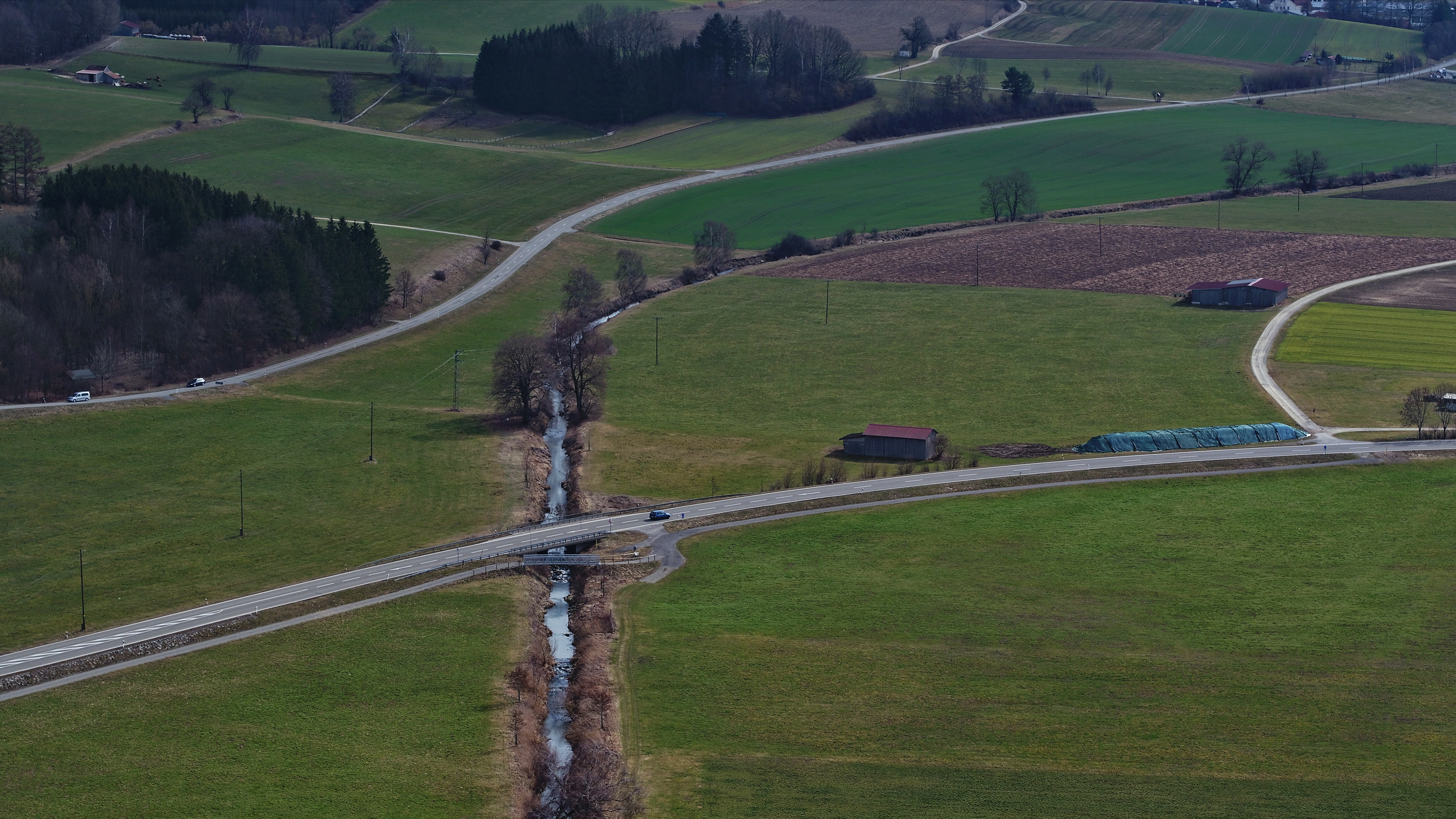
- The Hasel north of Haselbach, a part of Eppishausen

Location
- Country: Germany
- State: Bavaria

Physical characteristics
- Mouth
  - location: Mindel
  - coordinates: 48.2750°N 10.4728°E
- Length: 18.5 km (11.5 mi)

Basin features
- Progression: Mindel→ Danube→ Black Sea

Hasel (German pronunciation: [ˈhaːzl̩]) is a river of Bavaria, Germany. It is a right tributary of the Mindel in Thannhausen.

== See also ==
- List of rivers of Bavaria
