= Kirchheim in Schwaben (Verwaltungsgemeinschaft) =

- Verwaltungsgemeinschaft
- Location of Kirchheim in Schwaben within Unterallgäu district
- Interactive map of Kirchheim in Schwaben
- Location within Germany Location within Bavaria
- Coordinates: 48°10′N 10°29′E
- Country: Germany
- State: Bavaria
- Admin. region: Swabia
- District: Unterallgäu
- Seat: Kirchheim in Schwaben
- Subdivisions: 2 municipalities

Area
  - Total: 71.4 km^{2} (27.6 sq mi)

Population (2025-12-31)
  - Total: 4,462
  - Density: 62.5/km^{2} (162/sq mi)
- Time zone: UTC+01:00 (CET)
  - Summer (DST): UTC+02:00 (CEST)
- Website: vgem.kirchheim-schwaben.de

Kirchheim in Schwaben is a Verwaltungsgemeinschaft (municipal association) in the district of Unterallgäu in Bavaria, Germany. Its seat is in Kirchheim in Schwaben. It consists of the following municipalities:

1. Eppishausen
2. Kirchheim in Schwaben
