= Aufhof =

- Ortsteil of Eppishausen
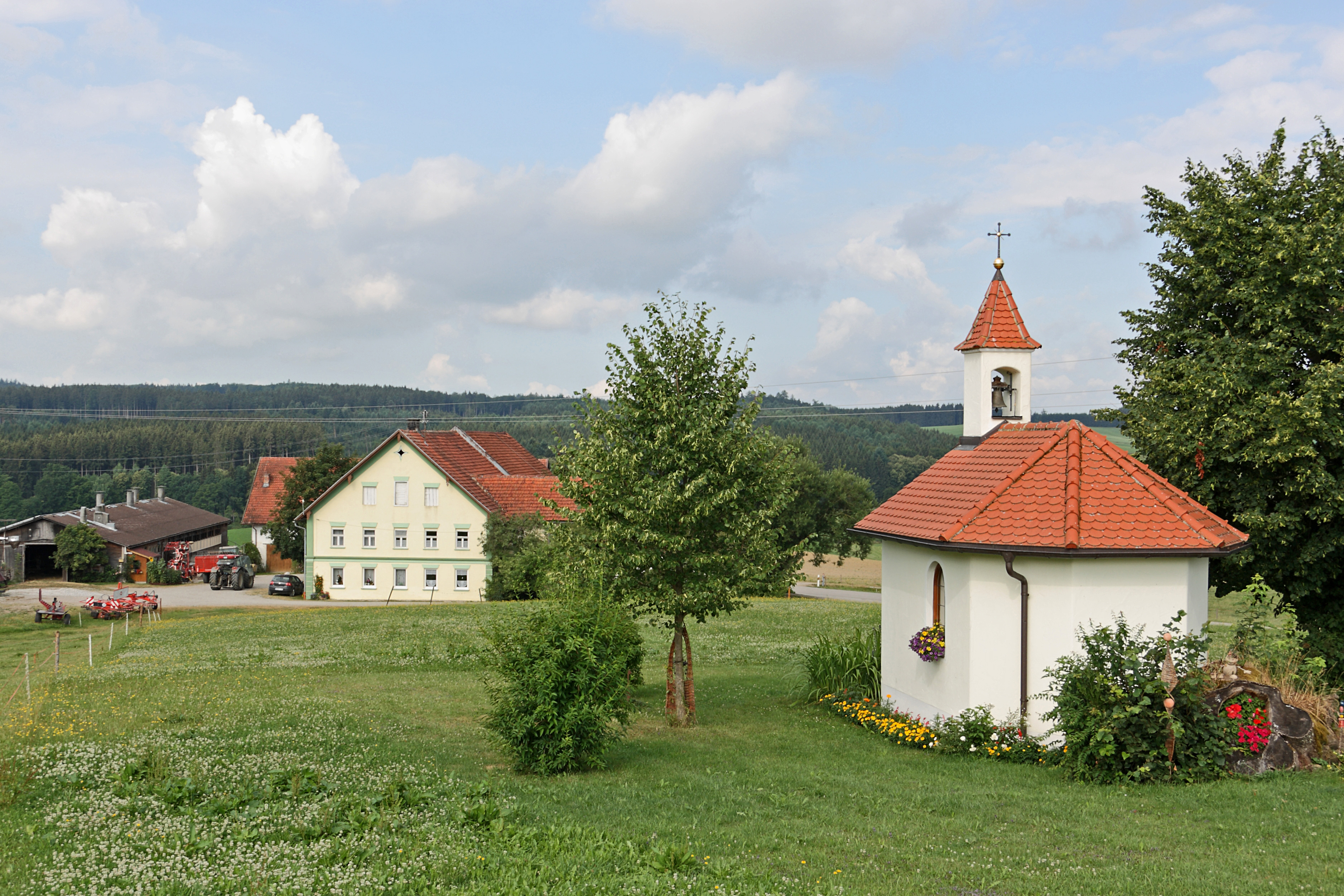
- Courtyard with Maria Trost chapel
- Interactive map of Aufhof
- Location within Germany Location within Bavaria
- Coordinates: 48.2029°N 10.5730°E
- Country: Germany
- State: Bavaria
- Municipality: Eppishausen
- Elevation: 550 m (1,800 ft)
- Time zone: UTC+01:00 (CET)
  - Summer (DST): UTC+02:00 (CEST)
- Postal codes: 87745
- Dialling codes: 08266

Aufhof is a settlement of the Upper Swabian municipality of Eppishausen in the Unterallgäu district of Germany. The single settlement is about 6 kilometres (3.7 mi)northeast of the main town and is connected to it by the state road St 2027 and the district road MN 3. It originally belonged to the municipality of Könghausen and was incorporated into the municipality of Eppishausen on July 1, 1972, as part of the regional reforms in Bavaria.
