= List of presidents of the First Chamber of the Estates of Württemberg =

List of presidents of the First Chamber of the Estates of Württemberg

Name	Period
August zu Hohenlohe-Öhringen	1820–1835
Ernst zu Hohenlohe-Langenburg	1835–1860
Albert von Rechberg und Rothenlöwen zu Hohenrechberg	1860–1872
Wilhelm von Zaldburg zu Teil und Trauchburg	1872–1899
Otto von Rechberg von Rothenlöwen zu Hohenrechberg	1899–1910
Johannes zu Hohenlohe-Bartenstein und Jagstberg	1911–1918

== Sources ==
- Raberg, Frank (editor): Biographisches Handbuch der württemberbergische Lantagsabgeordneten 1815-1933, Kohlhammer Verlag, Stuttgart 2001 ISBN 3-17-016604-2
