= Rechberg =

Former noble family

Coat of arms of Rechberg family

The House of Rechberg is an old noble comital family in Swabia during the Holy Roman Empire period. They were sovereign counts of Rechberg and Rothenlöwen. As a mediatized house (mediatized by Württemberg in 1806), the family belonged to the high nobility.

== Notable family members ==
- Ulrich I von Rechberg, ca. 1140–1206, auf Hohenrechberg, Swabian Marschall, married Edilhardis von Ramis and Berchterad von Biberbach
- Hildebrand (Hiltprand) von Rechberg, fl 1194–1226, auf Hohenrechberg, d. before 1235, married Anna, daughter of Heinrich Marschall von Pappenheim
- Conrad I "Monacus" von Rechberg, fl 1235
- Conrad II "der Landvogt" von Rechberg, fl 1259
- Albrecht (I) "der Landvogt" von Rechberg, fl 1293
- Albrecht III von Rechberg, zu Staufeneck, zu Falkenstein d. 1408
- Wilhelm I von Rechberg zu Hohenrechberg, d. after 1401; married Sophie von Veringen, daughter of Heinrich IV of Veringen
- Heinrich I von Rechberg zu Hohenrechberg und Gammertingen, d. 1437; married Agnes von Helfenstein, daughter of Ulrich VII of Helfenstein
- Hans von Rechberg-Hohenrechberg, zu Gammertingen, married Veronika von Waldburg (d. 1443) and Elisabeth von Werdenberg-Sargans, daughter of Heinrich IX (II) of Werdenberg-Sonnenberg (d. 1469)
