= Oberndorf am Lech =

- Municipality
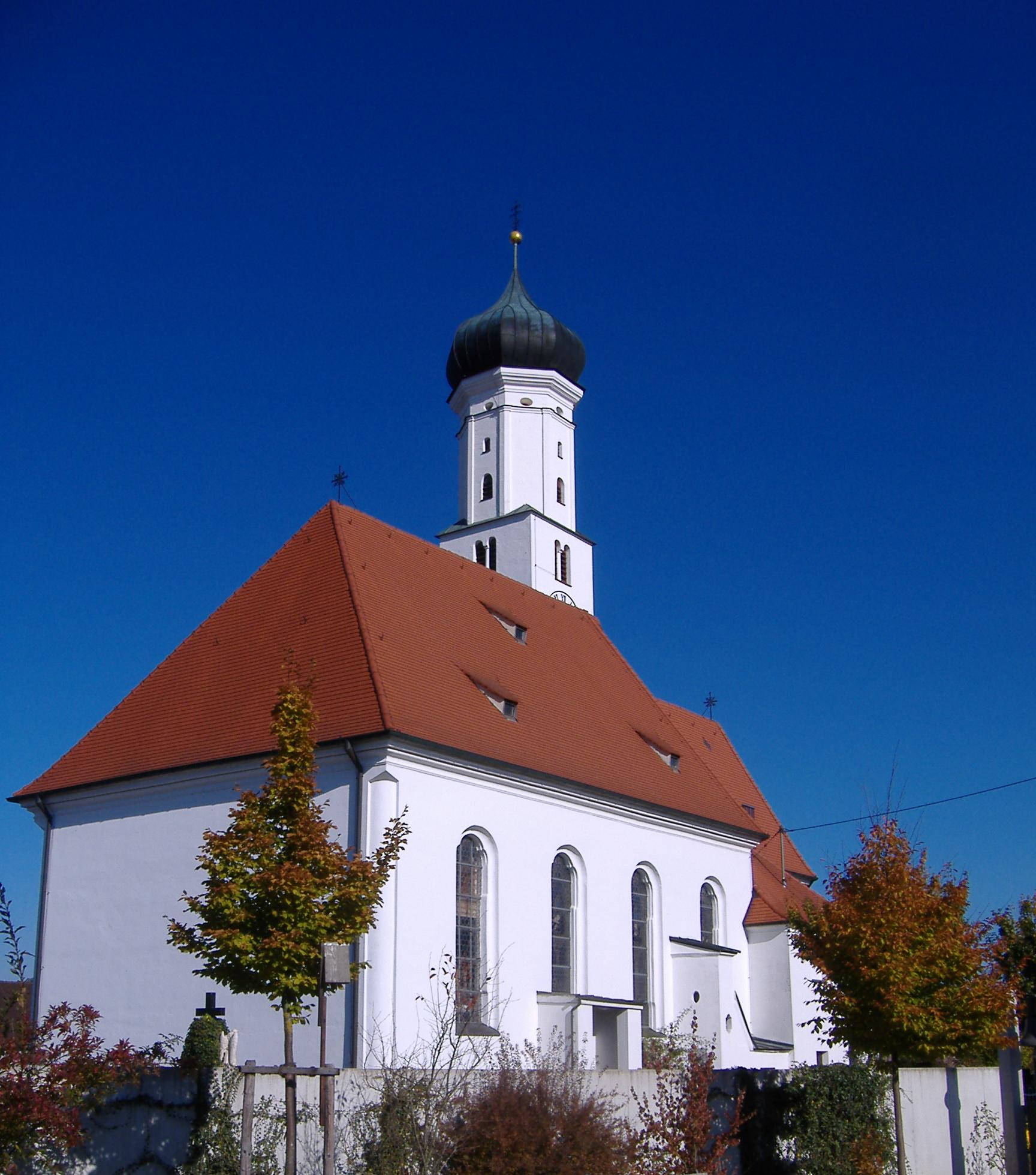
- Church of Saint Nicholas

- Coat of arms

- Location of Oberndorf am Lech within Donau-Ries district
- Interactive map of Oberndorf am Lech
- Location within Germany Location within Bavaria
- Coordinates: 48°40′N 10°52′E
- Country: Germany
- State: Bavaria
- Admin. region: Schwaben
- District: Donau-Ries

Government
  - Mayor (2020–26): Franz Moll

Area
  - Total: 19.37 km^{2} (7.48 sq mi)
- Elevation: 407 m (1,335 ft)

Population (2025-12-31)
  - Total: 2,649
  - Density: 136.8/km^{2} (354.2/sq mi)
- Time zone: UTC+01:00 (CET)
  - Summer (DST): UTC+02:00 (CEST)
- Postal codes: 86698
- Dialling codes: 09090
- Vehicle registration: DON
- Website: www.oberndorf-am-lech.de

Oberndorf (German pronunciation: [ˈoːbɐndɔʁf ʔam ˈlɛç], lit. 'Oberndorf on the Lech') is a municipality in the district of Donau-Ries in Bavaria in Germany. The river Lech flows through the village.

== Mayors ==
The mayor is Hubert Eberle, he was elected in 2002.

- Stefan Rößle (CSU), 1996 to 2002
- Franz Döschl, 1978 to 1996
