= Joseph-Ernst Graf Fugger von Glött =

German politician (1895–1981)

Joseph-Ernst Graf Fugger von Glött , since 1940: Fürst Fugger von Glött (26 October 1895, in Kirchheim in Schwaben – 13 May 1981, in Miesbach) was a German politician and representative of the Christian Social Union of Bavaria. He was a member of the Bundestag of Germany between 1949 and 1953. From 1954 to 1962 he was a member of the Landtag of Bavaria. He is a member of the famed House of Fugger, the preeminent bankers of the renaissance era.

== Early life ==
Joseph-Ernst Fugger von Glött was born on 26 October 1895 in the Kirchheim Castle near Augsburg. He was the third child and first son of Carl Ernst Fürst Fugger von Glött and his wife Elisabeth (Gräfin von Quadt-Wykradt-Isny). As a member of the famous Fugger family, Fugger von Glött was born into wealth and power. His father gained further fame and power by serving as the president of the upper house of the Bavarian Landtag.

Fugger von Glött received a typical upbringing for a young, aristocratic country man of his time: he completed his Abitur at the elite Gymnasium "Stella Matutina," took part in World War I as a lieutenant for an extremely prestigious Bavarian cavalry regiment, and completed his "Studium" after the war at the University of Hohenheim.

In his first marriage, he was married to Princess Stephanie of Hohenzollern (1895-1975, eldest daughter of Prince Karl Anton of Hohenzollern and Princess Joséphine Caroline of Belgium) between 1920 and 1943, when they divorced. In 1975 he married Angela von Kienlin (born in 1935), who was 40 years his junior.

At the death of his father in 1940 Fugger von Glött took over the official leadership of his household.

== Nazi Era ==
Fugger von Glött was drafted as an officer into the Wehrmacht in 1939 but, because of the Prinzenerlass, was prevented from serving. After being dismissed from military service, Fugger von Glött joined the Kreisau Circle.

After the 20 July plot failed, Fugger von Glött was arrested at his castle in Kirchheim on 3 September 1944 by the Gestapo for his role in the assassination attempt. Unlike the majority of conspirators, Fugger von Glött was sentenced to penal servitude rather than execution. He was freed by American troops in April 1945.

== Post-War ==
After the war, Fugger von Glött returned to his hometown in order to devote himself once again to his family and chores. During this time he was responsible for the activities of the many institutions of the family, including the reconstruction and expansion of the Fuggerei in Augsburg.

Fugger von Glött quickly began to invest himself in politics, and helped found the CSU in 1945/1946. He belonged to the first Bundestag and was president of the Interparliamentary Committee from 1953 until 1956. He was also a member of the Landtag of Bavaria from 1954 until 1962. He assisted fellow Kreisauer Kreis survivor Rudolf Ruby in providing his castle as a venue for Ruby's Deutsche Harmonia Mundi artists.

He was awarded the Order of Merit of the Federal Republic of Germany in 1965.

== See also ==
- List of Bavarian Christian Social Union politicians
