= Eppishausen =

- Municipality
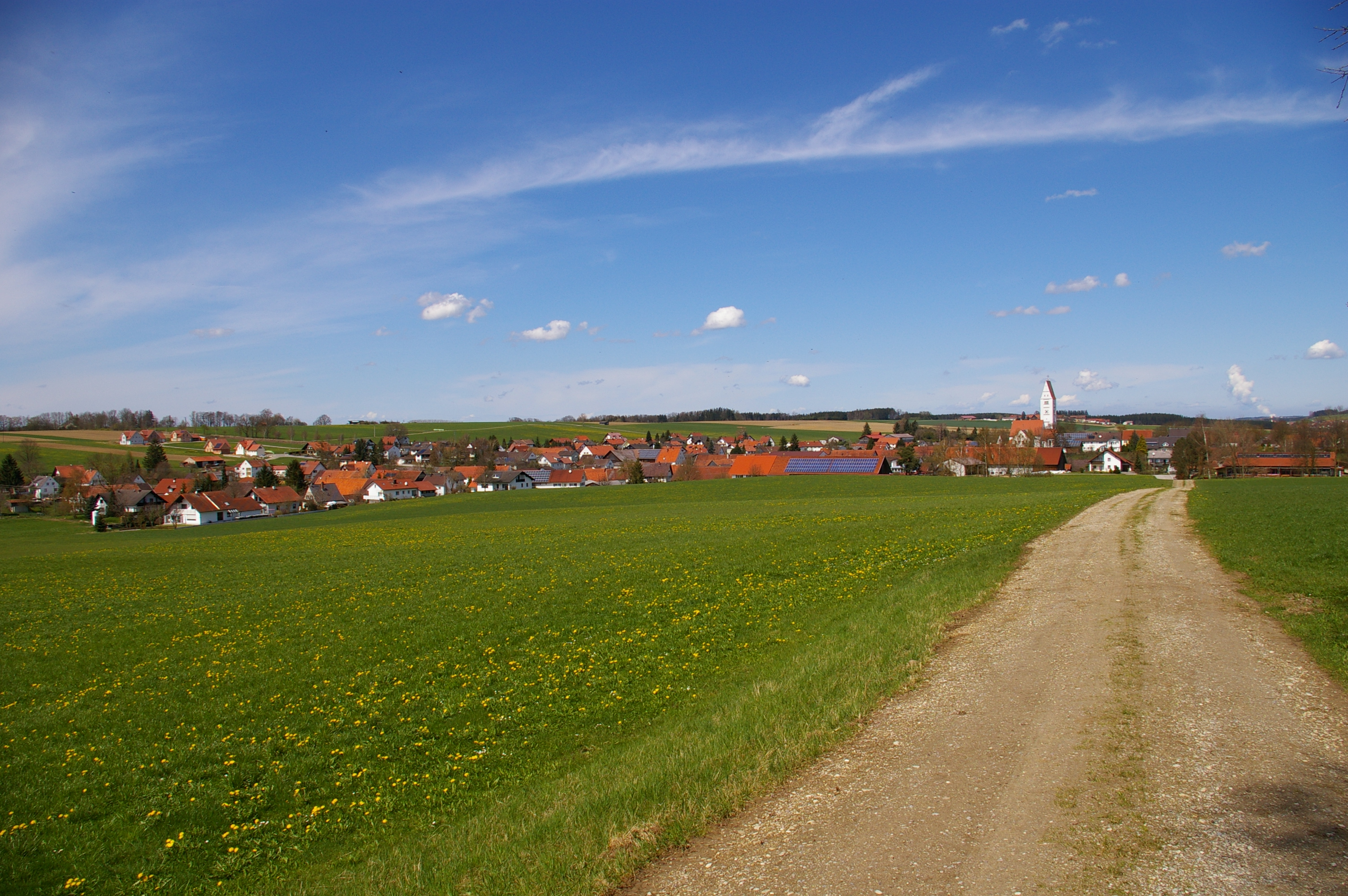
- Eppishausen

- Coat of arms

- Location of Eppishausen within Unterallgäu district
- Interactive map of Eppishausen
- Location within Germany Location within Bavaria
- Coordinates: 48°10′N 10°31′E
- Country: Germany
- State: Bavaria
- Admin. region: Schwaben
- District: Unterallgäu
- Municipal assoc.: Kirchheim in Schwaben

Government
  - Mayor (2020–26): Susanne Nieberle

Area
  - Total: 39.50 km^{2} (15.25 sq mi)
- Elevation: 550 m (1,800 ft)

Population (2025-12-31)
  - Total: 1,934
  - Density: 48.96/km^{2} (126.8/sq mi)
- Time zone: UTC+01:00 (CET)
  - Summer (DST): UTC+02:00 (CEST)
- Postal codes: 87745
- Dialling codes: 08266
- Vehicle registration: MN
- Website: www.eppishausen.de

Eppishausen is a municipality in the district of Unterallgäu in Swabia in Bavaria, Germany. It has a municipal association with Kirchheim in Schwaben, where the place of administration is centralized.

== Localities ==
- Aufhof
- Könghausen
