= Rechberg and Rothenlöwen =

County in the Holy Roman Empire

Coordinates: 48°9′N 10°10′E

Lordship (Barony, County) of Rechberg and Rothenlöwen Herrschaft (Freiherrschaft, Grafschaft) Rechberg und Rothenlöwen
- before 1206–1806
- Coat of arms of Osterberg
- Status: State of the Holy Roman Empire
- Capital: Unknown
- Government: Principality
- Historical era: Middle Ages
  - First mention of Rechberg: 1176
  - Established: before 1206 12th century
  - Raised to barony: 1577
  - Raised to county: 1607
  - Inherited Osterberg: 1767
  - Mediatised to Württemberg: 1806
  - Acquired by Bavaria: 1810
Preceded by	Succeeded by
Duchy of Swabia	Kingdom of Württemberg

Rechberg and Rothenlöwen was a county within the Holy Roman Empire. Rechberg and Rothenlöwen was a renaming of Osterberg, and it inherited Osterberg in 1767. Rechberg and Rothenlöwen was mediatised to Württemberg in 1806. It was ruled by the House of Rechberg which would be an important one in the 19th century. Aloys was a prominent Bavarian statesman, while his son Johann Bernhard, would enter the Austrian diplomatic service and rise eventually to the post of Minister of Foreign Affairs.

== Counts of Rechberg and Rothenlöwen ==
=== After German Mediatisation ===
- Maximilian Emanuel, Count 18..–1819 (1736–1819)
  - Aloys, Count 1819–1849 (1766–1849)
    - Albrecht, Count 1849–1885 (1803–1885)
      - Otto, Count 1885–1918 (1833–1918)
        - Joseph, Count 1918–1967 (1885–1967)
        - Count Albert (1887–1983)
          - Albert, Count 1967–2013 (1912–2013)
            - Bernhard, Count 2013–present (b.1956)
              - Konrad, Hereditary Count (b.1994)
              - Count Gaudenz (b.1996)
            - Count Nikolaus (b.1958)
              - Count Leon (b.1996)
