= Eberhard, 4th Prince of Waldburg-Zeil-Wurzach =

Prince of Waldburg-Zeil-Wurzach (1828–1903)

Eberhard II
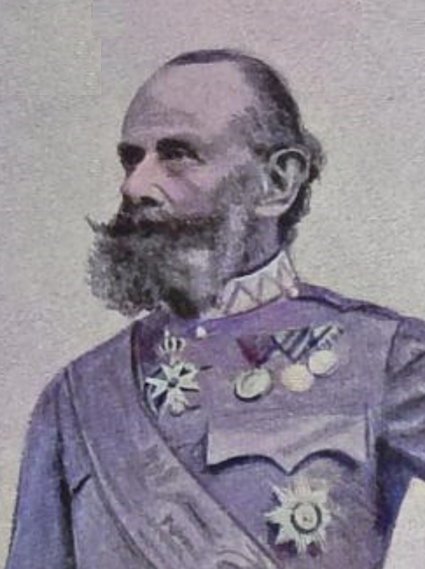

Prince of Waldburg-Zeil-Wurzach
- Reign: 1865–1903
- Predecessor: Karl
- Successor: None
- Born: 17 May 1828; Wurzach
- Died: 1 August 1903 (aged 75); Kisslegg
- Spouse: Countess Sophie Dubský of Trebomyšlice (m. 1856; died 1857) Countess Julia Dubský of Trebomyšlice (m. 1858; died 1903)
Names
- Eberhard II Franz Leopold Maria zu Waldburg-Zeil-Wurzach
- House: House of Waldburg
- Father: Leopold, 2nd Prince of Waldburg-Zeil-Wurzach
- Mother: Countess Maria Josepha Fugger von Babenhausen

Eberhard II, 4th Prince of Waldburg-Zeil-Wurzach (17 May 1828 – 1 August 1903) was a German prince and politician.

== Early life ==
Eberhard was born on 17 May 1828 at Wurzach. He was the son of Leopold, 2nd Prince of Waldburg-Zeil-Wurzach (1795–1861), and Countess Maria Josepha Fugger von Babenhausen (1798–1831), who were first cousins. Among his siblings was elder brother, Karl, 3rd Prince of Waldburg-Zeil-Wurzach.

His paternal grandparents were Hereditary Count Leopold von Waldburg-Zeil-Wurzach (only son and heir apparent of Eberhard, 1st Prince of Waldburg-Zeil-Wurzach), and Countess Maria Walburga von Kirchberg-Weißenhorn. His maternal grandparents were Anselm, 1st Prince Fugger von Babenhausen and Countess Maria Antonia von Waldburg-Zeil-Wurzach. His maternal uncle, Anton, 2nd Prince Fugger von Babenhausen, married Princess Franziska of Hohenlohe-Bartenstein-Jagtsberg (a daughter of Charles Joseph, 1st Prince of Hohenlohe-Jagstberg).

== Career ==
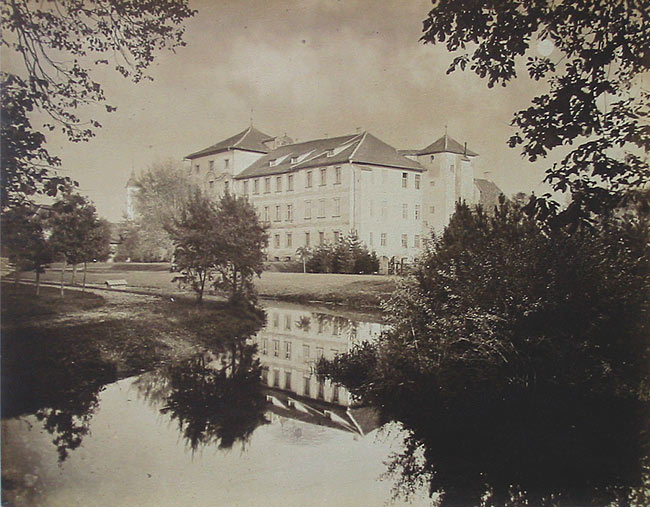
Wurzach Castle, 1870

Upon renunciation of title by his elder brother in 1865, he succeeded as the titular 4th Prince of Waldburg-Zeil-Wurzach, a former Principality within Holy Roman Empire located on the southeastern border of Baden-Württemberg, Germany, located around Wurzach, that had been partitioned from Waldburg-Zeil. The Principality, however, had been mediatised to the Kingdom of Württemberg in 1806.

From 1864 to 1869 he was a member of the Chamber of Imperial Councillors in the Kingdom of Bavaria. In 1865, Eberhard II also entered the First Chamber of the Estates of Württemberg as a Standesherr and personally attended the sessions until 1891. From 1877 to 1880, he was the leader of the vote for the Prince of Löwenstein-Wertheim-Freudenberg. Beginning in 1893, Prince Eberhard II was represented in the state parliament by the Prince of Löwenstein-Wertheim-Freudenberg, then from 1895 by the Prince of Hohenlohe-Waldenburg-Schillingsfürst.

When Prince Eberhard II considered moving his residence from Wurzach to Kißlegg in the early 1870s, he gradually acquired the individual shares of the Hundswiese meadow and the gardens north of the palace. Even before moving into his palace in September 1876, he appointed Joseph Kieferle von Mengen as court gardener to create a stately vegetable garden with a greenhouse and a spacious palace park.

In 1870, he was awarded the Grand Cross of the Order of the Württemberg Crown. From 22 April 1871, he was the senior most member of the House of Waldburg and, as such, was Imperial Hereditary Oberhofmeister of the Kingdom of Württemberg.

== Personal life ==
Prince Eberhard was married twice. On 28 August 1856 at Zdislawitz Castle near Kroměříž in Moravia (present day Zdislavice in the Czech Republic), he married Countess Sophie Dubský of Třebomyslice (1835–1857), a daughter of Count Franz Josef Ignaz Nepomuk Vinzenz Dubský, Baron of Třebomyslice, of Kißlegg Castle in Württemberg, and, his second wife, Baroness Eugenie von Bartenstein. From her father's first marriage, she had an elder half-sister, noted writer Countess Marie von Ebner-Eschenbach. Before her death in 1857, they were the parents of one daughter:

- Countess Marie Eugenie Sophie Xaverine Gisella of Waldburg-Zeil-Wurzach (1857–1924), who married Count Karl von Waldburg-Zeil (later Waldburg-Syrgenstein), a son of Prince Constantin von Waldburg zu Zeil und Trauchburg and Countess Maximiliane von Quadt-Wyckradt-Isny, in 1882. After his death in 1890, she married Austrian diplomat Baron Karl Heidler von Egeregg, a son of medical professor Baron Karl Heidler von Egeregg.

On 5 August 1858, also at Zdislawitz Castle, he married the younger half-sister of his first wife, Countess Julia Dubský of Třebomyslice (1841–1914), the daughter of Count Franz Josef Ignaz Nepomuk Vinzenz Dubský of Třebomyslice, and, his third wife, Countess Xaverine von Kolowrat-Krakowsky. Together, they were the parents of five daughters:

- Countess Xaveria Maria Juliana of Waldburg-Zeil-Wurzach (1860–1901), who married, as his second wife, Count Sigismund von Attems-Petzenstein, in 1880.
- Countess Marie Gabriele Josepha of Waldburg-Zeil-Wurzach (1861–1941), who died unmarried.
- Countess Anna Maria Josepha Leopoldina of Waldburg-Zeil-Wurzach (1862–1868), who died young.
- Countess Franziska Seraphica Maria Assumpta of Waldburg-Zeil-Wurzach (1863–1924), who died unmarried.
- Countess Elisabeth Sophia Maria of Waldburg zu Zeil-Wurzach (1866–1950), who married Count Maximilian von Moy de Sons in 1889.

Prince Eberhard II died at Kisslegg on 1 August 1903. As he had no male issue, the Waldburg-Zeil-Wurzach line died out in the male line after which Prince Wilhelm of Waldburg-Zeil, also bore the title of Prince of Waldburg-Zeil-Wurzach.
