= Anselm Maria Fugger von Babenhausen =

Anselm Maria
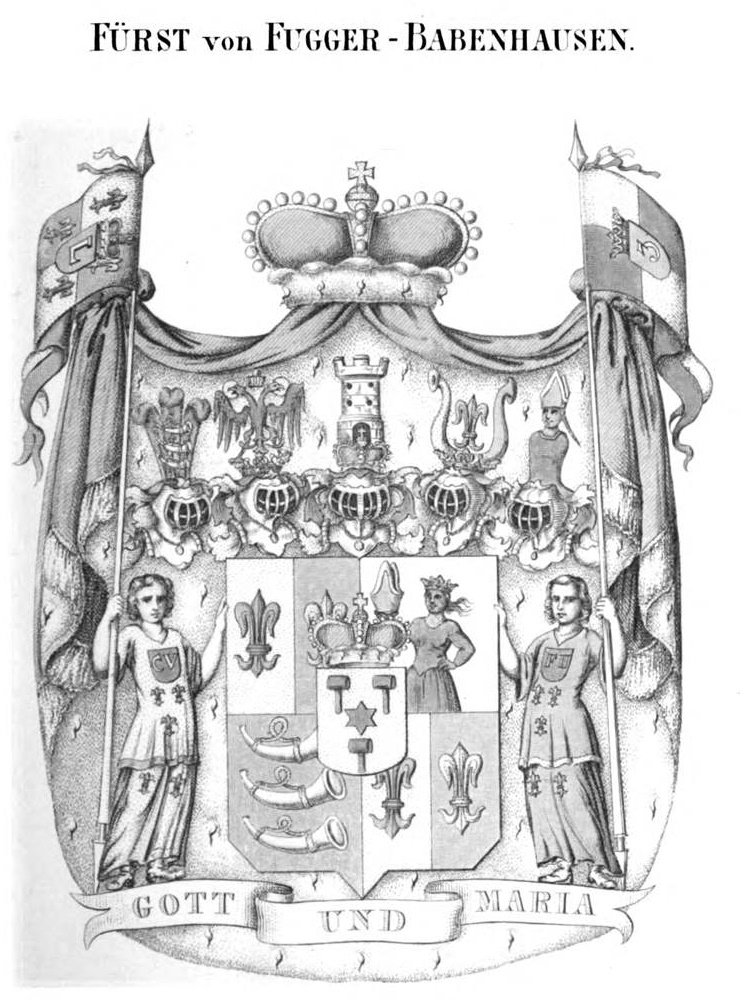

Prince Fugger von Babenhausen
- Reign: 1803–1821 (mediatized in 1806)
- Predecessor: None
- Successor: Anton
- Born: 1 July 1766; Babenhausen
- Died: 20 November 1821 (aged 55); Babenhausen
- Spouse: Countess Maria Antonia Elisabetha von Waldburg zu Zeil-Wurzach (m. 1793; died 1814)
- Anselm Maria Joseph Christoph Johann Baptist Johann Nepomuk Rupert Theodor Aloys Karl Fugger von Babenhausen
- House: Fugger
- Father: Count Anselm Viktorian Fugger
- Mother: Countess Maria Walburga von Waldburg-Wolfegg-Wolfegg

Anselm Maria Fürst Fugger von Babenhausen (1 July 1766 – 20 November 1821) was a German nobleman of the Fugger family. He was the first reigning Count (and later Imperial Prince) of the Principality of Babenhausen, in what is now the Landkreis Unterallgäu.

== Early life ==
Anselm was born on 1 July 1766 in Babenhausen. He the eldest son of Count Anselm Viktorian Fugger and Countess Maria Walburga von Waldburg-Wolfegg-Wolfegg. His sister, Countess Maria Walpurga Franziska Fugger von Babenhausen, married Hereditary Count Leopold von Waldburg-Zeil-Wurzach.

A direct male-line descendant of Anton Fugger, through his son, son Jakob Fugger (1542–1598), Anselm Maria was a fifth-generation descendant of his son Johann Fugger the Elder. After an education by a court master tours of the court, and studies in Mainz, Fugger began to concentrate on his future duties as ruler of Babenhausen in 1785. After his father's death in 1793, he took over the affairs of government. Since 1583, the Fuggers had held hereditary imperial and district estates in the Swabian Circle and belonged to the Swabian College of Imperial Counts.

== Career ==
After an apprenticeship with a court master, cavalier journeys and studies in Mainz, from 1785 Fugger began to focus his future duties as sovereign in Babenhausen. After the death of his father in 1793 he took over the affairs of state. Since 1583, the Fuggers had held the hereditary imperial and district estates in the Swabian district and belonged to the Swabian Imperial Counts' College.

From 1796 Fugger's actions were influenced by the beginning of the Napoleonic era, as there was a strong Austrian decline in power in Swabia. French armies began to devastate Swabia. In 1800 Babenhausen was occupied by French troops for the first time.

=== Elevation to Imperial Prince ===
Around 1800 there was an imbalance in the Council of Princes in favour of the Protestant princes. The imperial court had the ambition to change this. Thus it let it be circulated that under certain circumstances it could raise catholic states of the empire into the imperial princely state. However, this increase was not to be free of charge. Given Anselm Maria's desolate financial circumstances, the sum of 20000 gulden demanded was horrendous. Nevertheless, it was important for Anselm Maria to seize the opportunity.

After the Peace of Lunéville in 1801 and the subsequent main decision of the Reichsdeputation in 1803, Fugger's efforts consisted in securing the future of his present principality through as many activities as possible. Through activities in the Swabian district and in the Swabian Imperial Count's College he tried to do this with like-minded people. In the War of the Third Coalition in autumn 1805, he and his colleagues tried in vain to preserve independence and reduce the burden of war.

With the conclusion of the Rhenish Confederation Act of 12 July 1806, and the associated end of the Empire, the end of the smaller states and thus also of the Principality of Babenhausen was sealed. On 15 September 1806, the Kingdom of Bavaria formally took possession of the Principality of Babenhausen. In 1806 and 1807, Anselm Maria attempted to improve the lot of his principality and his dominions under the Bavarian crown. He was only granted the same rights as the other formerly smaller secular imperial estates occupied by Bavaria, the Mediatized. In 1808, he received the court office of a Bavarian Crown chamberlain.

From 1815 to 1817, he was a voting member of the Estates of Württemberg, however, he did not attend the meetings in Stuttgart in person, but was represented by Count Richard von Schaesberg-Tannheim.

== Personal life ==
On 15 October 1793 in Mooshausen, he married Countess Maria Antonia Elisabetha von Waldburg zu Zeil-Wurzach (1774–1814), a daughter of Eberhard, 1st Prince of Waldburg-Zeil-Wurzach and Countess Maria Katharina Fugger von Kirchberg-Weißenhorn. Together, they were the parents of the following children:

- Countess Maria Karolina Fugger von Babenhausen (1794–1799), who died young.
- Countess Maria Walburga Fugger von Babenhausen (1796–1833)
- Countess Maria Josepha Fugger von Babenhausen (1798–1831), who married her cousin, Leopold, 2nd Prince of Waldburg-Zeil-Wurzach, in 1821.
- Anton Anselm Fugger von Babenhausen (1800–1836), who married Princess Franziska of Hohenlohe-Bartenstein-Jagtsberg, a daughter of Charles Joseph, 1st Prince of Hohenlohe-Jagstberg.
- Countess Maria Fugger von Babenhausen (1802–1803), who died young.
- Count Joseph Anselm Fugger von Babenhausen (1804–1835)
- Count Jacob Anselm Fugger von Babenhausen (1805–1832)
- Count Maximilian Anselm Fugger von Babenhausen (1807–1809), who died young.

His wife died on 5 October 1814. Prince Anselm died in 1821 from the effects of a stroke. In keeping with his rank, he was buried in the Fugger family crypt in the castle church in Babenhausen.

=== Descendants ===
Through his daughter Maria Josepha, he was a grandfather of Karl, 3rd Prince of Waldburg-Zeil-Wurzach and Eberhard, 4th Prince of Waldburg-Zeil-Wurzach.
