= Leopold, 2nd Prince of Waldburg-Zeil-Wurzach =

Leopold
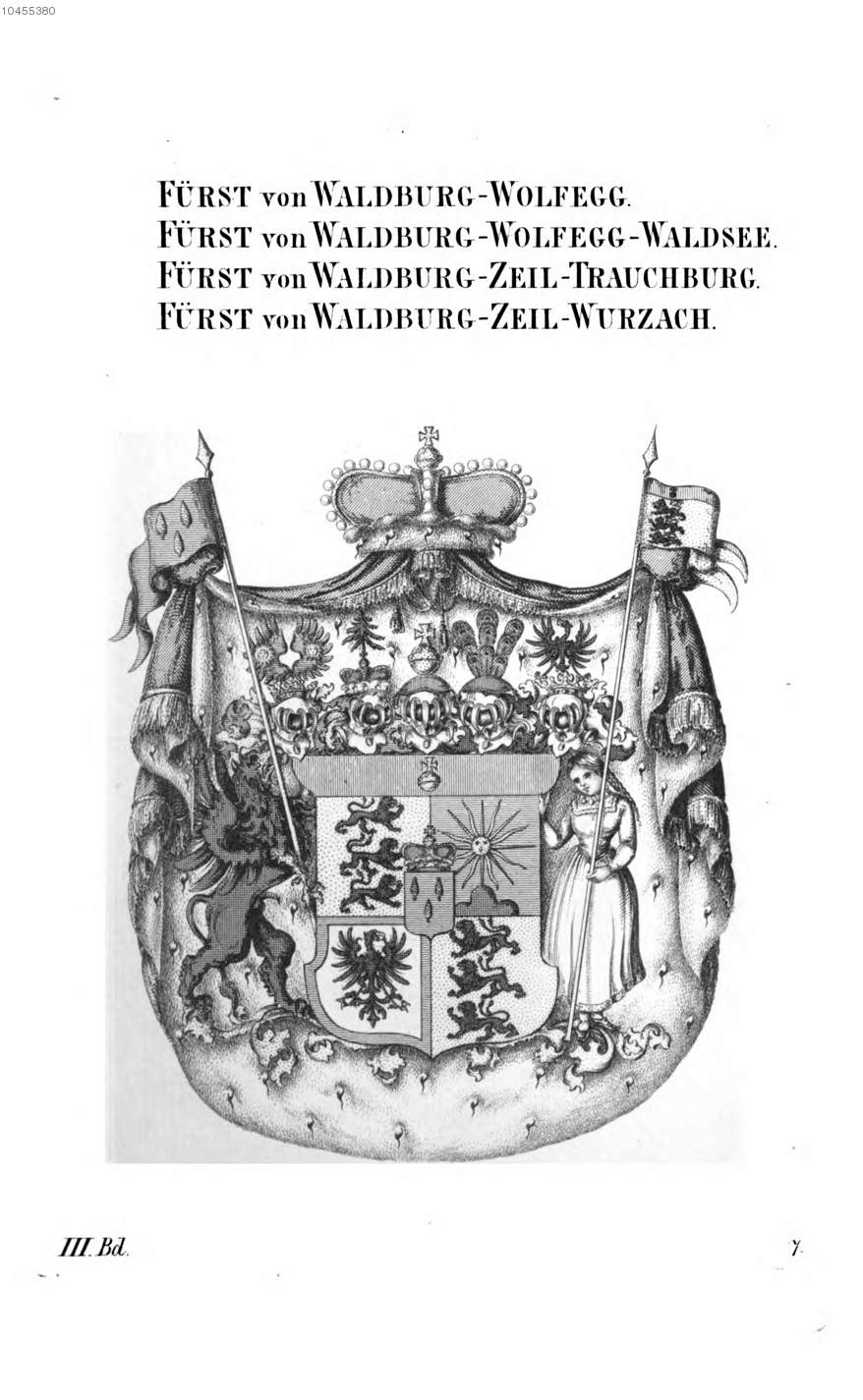

Prince of Waldburg-Zeil-Wurzach
- Reign: 1807–1861
- Predecessor: Eberhard
- Successor: Karl
- Born: 11 November 1795; Bad Wurzach
- Died: 26 April 1861 (aged 65); Bad Wurzach
- Spouse: Countess Maria Josepha Fugger von Babenhausen (m. 1821; died 1831)
Names
- Leopold Maria Carl Eberhard Fidel Alois Stephan Martin von Waldburg zu Zeil-Wurzach
- House: Waldburg
- Father: Count Leopold von Waldburg-Zeil-Wurzach
- Mother: Countess Maria Walburga von Kirchberg-Weißenhorn

Leopold Maria Carl Eberhard Fidel Alois Stephan Martin, 2nd Prince of Waldburg-Zeil-Wurzach (11 November 1795 – 26 April 1861) was a German prince and politician.

== Early life ==
Leopold was born at Bad Wurzach on 11 November 1795. He was the son of Hereditary Count Leopold von Waldburg-Zeil-Wurzach (1769–1800) and Countess Maria Walburga von Kirchberg-Weißenhorn (1771–1841). Among his siblings were Countess Walpurgis (wife of Charles Joseph, 1st Prince of Hohenlohe-Jagstberg), Count Maximilian (who died unmarried), Count Carl (who died unmarried), and Countess Maria Theresia (wife of Count Karl von Maldeghem).

His father was the only son, and heir apparent before his death, of Eberhard, 1st Prince of Waldburg-Zeil-Wurzach and Countess Maria Katharina Fugger von Glött. His paternal aunt, Countess Maria Antonia von Waldburg-Zeil-Wurzach, married Anselm, 1st Prince Fugger von Babenhausen.

== Career ==
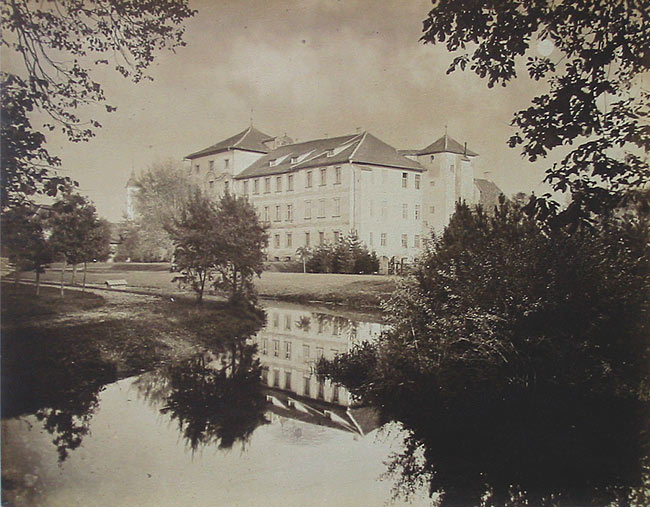
Wurzach Castle, 1870

As his father predeceased his grandfather, upon the death of the latter in 1807, the minor Leopold succeeded as the titular 2nd Prince of Waldburg-Zeil-Wurzach, a former Principality within Holy Roman Empire located on the southeastern border of Baden-Württemberg, Germany, located around Wurzach, that had been partitioned from Waldburg-Zeil. The Principality had been mediatised to the Kingdom of Württemberg in 1806, the year before he became Prince. Because of his minority, he was initially under guardianship until 1815.

In 1833, Prince Leopold entered the First Chamber of the Estates of Württemberg as a member of the Estates of the State Parliament, and personally participated in its sessions until 1853 after which the Prince was represented in the Württemberg State Parliament. From 1846 until his death 1861, he was also a member of the Chamber of Imperial Councillors of the Crown of Bavaria.

== Personal life ==
On 18 December 1821, he married his first cousin, Countess Maria Josepha Fugger von Babenhausen (1798–1831), a daughter of Anselm, 1st Prince Fugger von Babenhausen and Countess Maria Antonia von Waldburg-Zeil-Wurzach. Her brother, Anton, 2nd Prince Fugger von Babenhausen, married Princess Franziska of Hohenlohe-Bartenstein-Jagtsberg (a daughter of Charles Joseph, 1st Prince of Hohenlohe-Jagstberg). Together, they lived at Wurzach Castle and were the parents of:

- Countess Maria of Waldburg-Zeil-Wurzach (1822–1893), who never married.
- Countess Maria Walpurga of Waldburg-Zeil-Wurzach (1824–1837), who died young.
- Karl, 3rd Prince of Waldburg-Zeil-Wurzach (1825–1907), who resigned in 1865 in favor of his younger brother; he married Marie Luise Laib in 1858.
- Countess Maria Theresia of Waldburg-Zeil-Wurzach (1827–1831), who died young.
- Eberhard, 4th Prince of Waldburg-Zeil-Wurzach (1828–1903), who married Countess Sophie Dubský of Třebomyslice, a daughter of Count Franz Josef Ignaz Nepomuk Vinzenz Dubský, Baron of Třebomyslice, of Kißlegg Castle in Württemberg, and, his second wife, Baroness Eugenie von Bartenstein, in 1856. After her death in 1857, he married the younger half-sister of his first wife, Countess Julia Dubský of Třebomyslice.

Prince Leopold died at Bad Wurzach on 26 April 1861. He was succeeded by his eldest son, Karl. Four years later, Karl resigned his princely rights in favor of his younger brother, Eberhard II. Following his Eberhard's death in 1903, the Waldburg-Zeil-Wurzach line died out in the male line after which Prince Wilhelm of Waldburg-Zeil, also bore the title of Prince of Waldburg-Zeil-Wurzach.

=== Descendants ===
Through his son Eberhard's first marriage, he was a grandfather of Countess Marie of Waldburg-Zeil-Wurzach (1857–1924), who married Count Karl von Waldburg-Zeil (later Waldburg-Syrgenstein), and, after his death, Austrian diplomat Baron Karl Heidler von Egeregg. Through his son Eberhard's second marriage, he was the grandfather of five, including Countess Xaveria of Waldburg-Zeil-Wurzach (1860–1901), who married Count Sigismund von Attems-Petzenstein, and Countess Elisabeth of Waldburg zu Zeil-Wurzach (1866–1950), who married Count Maximilian von Moy de Sons.
