= Jakob III. Fugger =

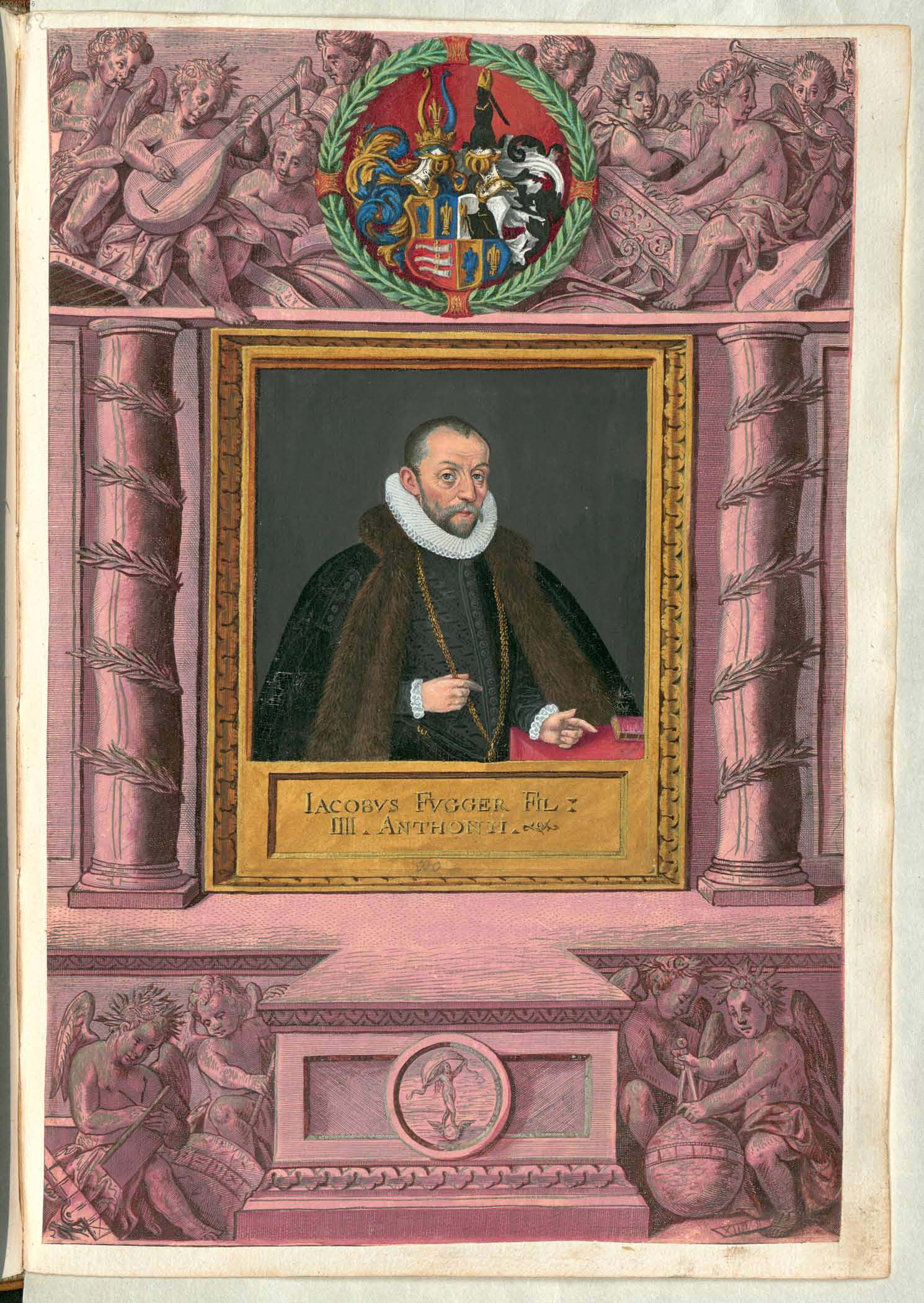
Jakob III. Fugger in the Fuggerorum et Fuggerarum imagines by Dominicus Custos

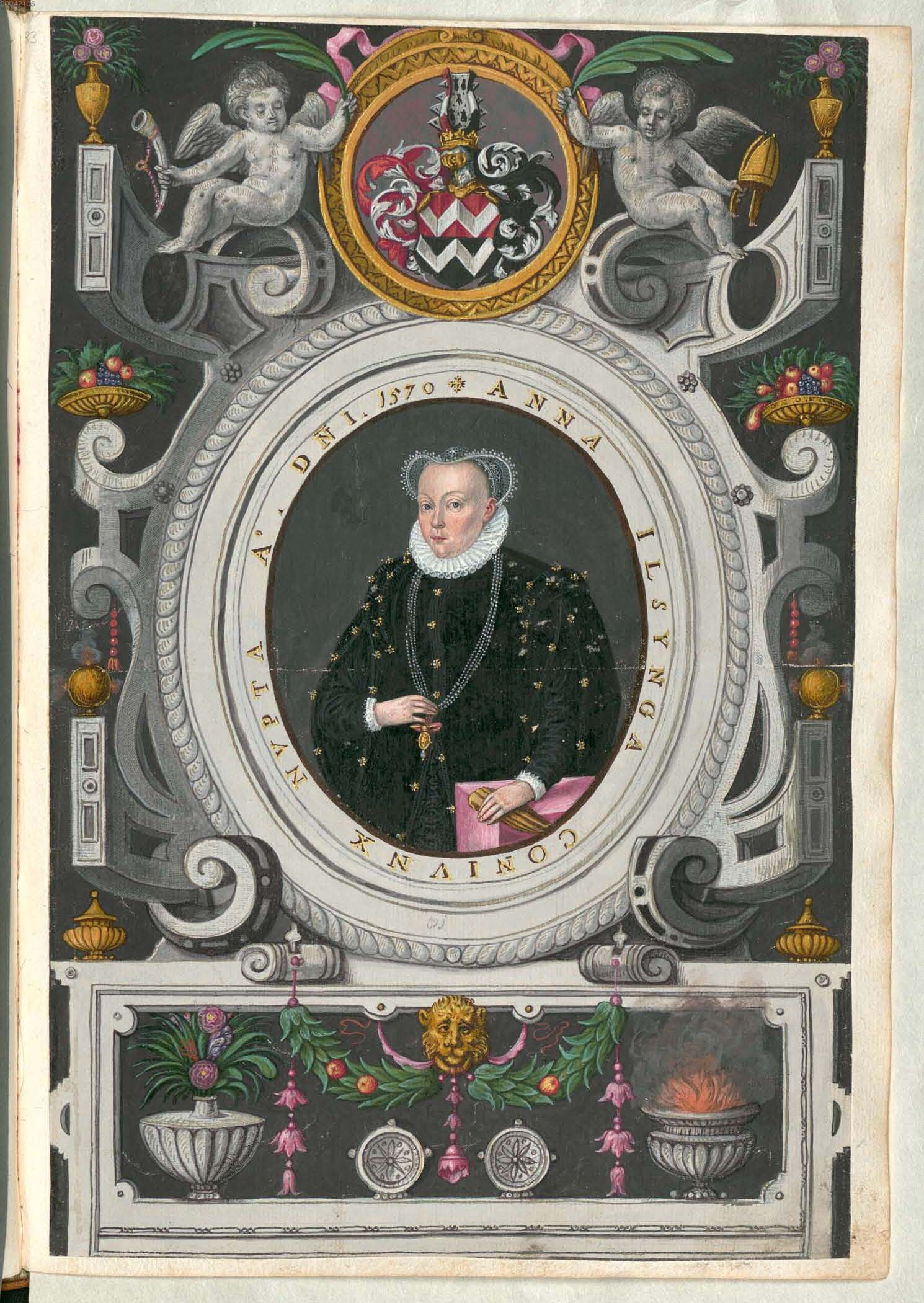
His wife Anna Ilsung von Tratzberg

Jakob III. Fugger (30 March 1542, in Babenhausen, Bavaria – 7 February 1598, in Babenhausen, Bavaria) was a German businessman and landowner of the Fugger family. He was also Lord of Schloss Babenhausen in Unterallgäu.

== Life ==
He was the fourth son of Anton Fugger and Anna von Rehlingen. On their father's death in 1560, he and his brothers jointly managed the family's company and lands, which were both now of considerable size. In 1573, all the lands were divided between the brothers, with Jakob gaining the lordships of Babenhausen, Wellenburg and Boos among others. In 1583, he and his brothers were granted Reichsstandschaft in the Schwäbischen Reichsgrafenkollegium and the status of count in the Swabian Reichskreis.

== Marriage and issue ==
In 1570, Jakob married Anna Ilsung von Tratzberg. They had the following children:

- Sibylla Freiin Fugger (1572–1616)
- Hieronymus Freiherr Fugger (1574–1579)
- Katharina Freiin Fugger (1575–1607)
- Georg Graf Fugger, Landvogt in Schwaben (1577–1643)
- Veronika Gräfin Fugger (1578–1645)
- Regina Gräfin Fugger (1581–1633)
- Anna Gräfin Fugger (1582–1633)
- Johann Fugger the Elder, Herr zu Babenhausen (1583–1633)
- Hieronymus Graf Fugger, Herr zu Wellenburg (1584–1633)
- Maximilian Graf Fugger, Herr zu Boos (1587–1629)
- Jakob Freiherr Fugger (1588–1607)
