= Anton, 2nd Prince Fugger von Babenhausen =

Anton Anselm
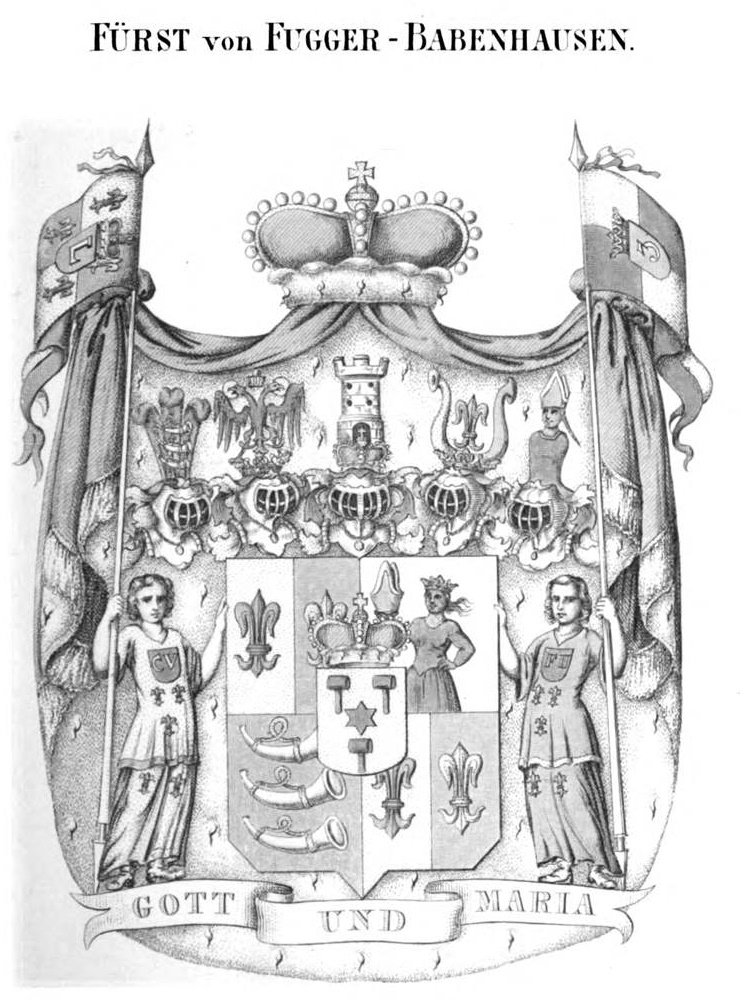

Prince Fugger von Babenhausen
- Reign: 1821–1836
- Predecessor: Anselm Maria
- Successor: Leopold
- Born: 13 January 1800; Babenhausen, Principality of Babenhausen
- Died: 28 May 1836 (aged 36); Babenhausen, Kingdom of Bavaria
- Spouse: Princess Franziska of Hohenlohe-Bartenstein-Jagtsberg (m. 1825; died 1836)
- Antonius de Padua Anselm Maria Joseph Johannes Nepomuk Carl Hilarius Fugger von Babenhausen
- House: Fugger
- Father: Anselm, 1st Prince Fugger von Babenhausen
- Mother: Countess Maria Antonia Elisabetha von Waldburg zu Zeil-Wurzach

Anton Anselm Fürst Fugger von Babenhausen (13 January 1800 – 28 May 1836) was a German nobleman of the Fugger family. He was the titular Prince of the Principality of Babenhausen (mediatized to the Kingdom of Bavaria in 1806), (Note: Anton was also Hereditary Count Fugger of Babenhausen, Lord of Boas, Heimertingen, Wald, Wellenberg, Count of Kirchberg, etc.) in what is now the Landkreis Unterallgäu.

== Early life ==
Anton was born on 13 January 1800 in Babenhausen. He was the eldest son of Anselm, 1st Prince Fugger von Babenhausen and Countess Maria Antonia Elisabetha von Waldburg zu Zeil-Wurzach (1774–1814). Among his siblings were Countess Maria Josepha Fugger von Babenhausen, who married their cousin, Leopold, 2nd Prince of Waldburg-Zeil-Wurzach.

His paternal grandparents were Count Anselm Viktorian Fugger and Countess Maria Walburga von Waldburg-Wolfegg-Wolfegg. His paternal aunt, Countess Maria Walpurga Franziska Fugger von Babenhausen, married Hereditary Count Leopold von Waldburg-Zeil-Wurzach (eldest son and heir apparent of Eberhard, 1st Prince of Waldburg-Zeil-Wurzach).

== Career ==
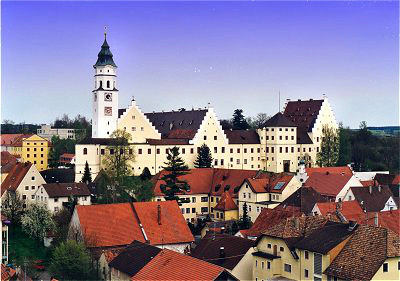
Babenhausen Castle

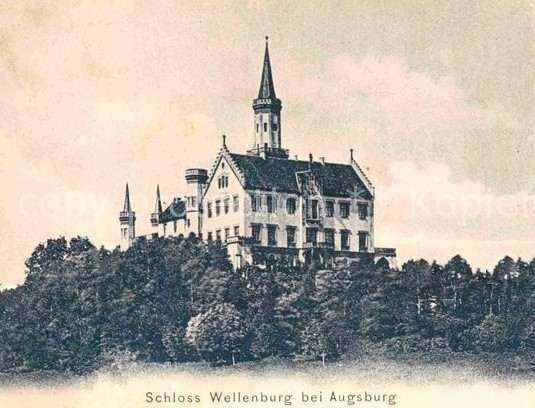
Wellenburg Castle

On the death of his father in 1821, he inherited the Fugger estates, including Wellenburg Castle and Babenhausen Castle, as well as the Fugger houses in Augsburg. He became a Bavarian Lord of State and the second Prince Fugger of Babenhausen with the noble title of His Serene Highness. From 1821 to 1836, he was a hereditary member of the Bavarian Chamber of Imperial Councillors. During the second electoral period from 1825 to 1831, he was a member of the Complaints Committee in the third State Parliament in 1825. In the fourth State Parliament from 1827 to 1828, he was a member of the Interior Committee in the Reichsrat.

He was also a member of the district council in the Upper Danube District, appointed by the Bavarian King, and from 1832, as a Bavarian major à la suite, commander of the Landwehr of the Upper Danube District. At the same time, he was promoted to the rank of Colonel. In 1830 and, again, in 1833, he was elected president of the district council in the Upper Danube District.

== Personal life ==
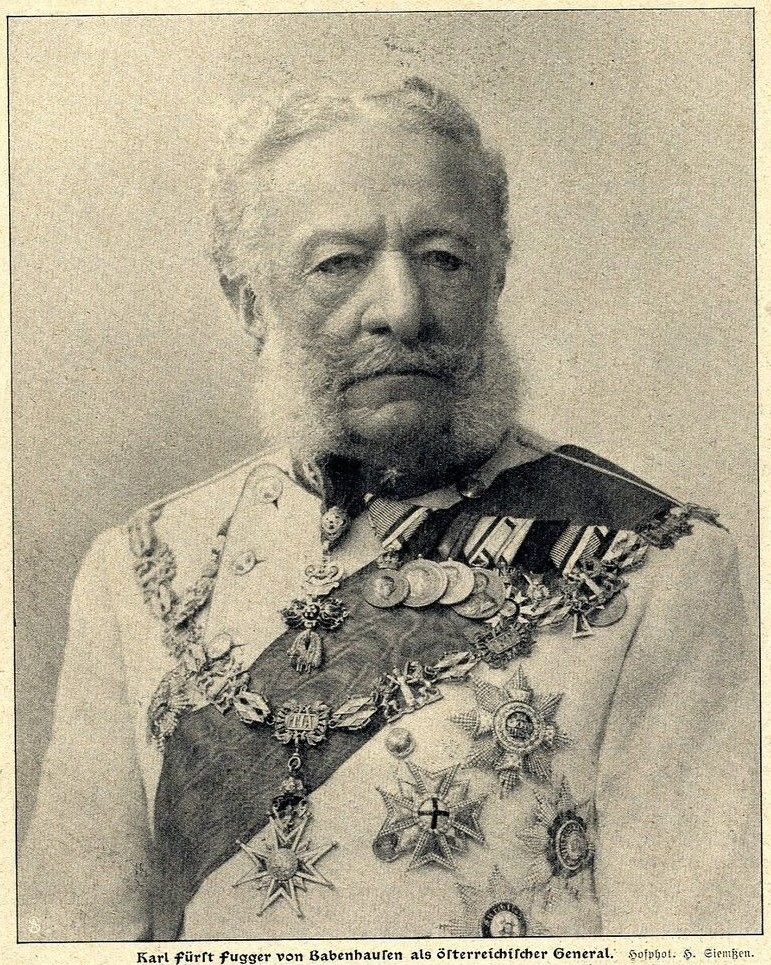
Court photograph of his second son, Karl Ludwig

On 20 October 1825, Prince Anton married Princess Franziska of Hohenlohe-Bartenstein-Jagtsberg (August 29, 1807 – September 28, 1873), a daughter of Charles Joseph, 1st Prince of Hohenlohe-Jagstberg and Duchess Henriette of Württemberg (the youngest daughter of Louis Eugene, Duke of Württemberg, reigning Duke of Württemberg). Together, they were the parents of the following children:

- Countess Theresia Fugger von Babenhausen (1826–1884), who died unmarried.
- Leopold Fugger von Babenhausen (1827–1885), who married Countess Anna von Gatterburg in 1857.
- Karl Ludwig Fugger von Babenhausen (1829–1906), who married Countess Friederike von Christallnigg in 1855.
- Countess Eugenia Fugger von Babenhausen (1833–1853), who died unmarried.
- Count Friedrich Fugger von Babenhausen (1836–1907), who married Baroness Maria von Gudenus in 1872.

After a long illness, Prince Anton died at Babenhausen on 28 May 1836. His successor as Prince and Head of the Babenhausen estate and the entire princely entail was his eldest son Leopold, Hereditary Count Fugger of Babenhausen.

=== Descendants ===
Through his second son, Karl Ludwig, he was a grandfather of Karl, 5th Prince Fugger von Babenhausen (1861–1925), who married Princess Eleonore of Hohenlohe-Bartenstein (third child of Prince Carl zu Hohenlohe-Bartenstein); and Countess Marie Fugger von Babenhausen, who married Count Christoph von Wydenbruck, Ambassador of Austria-Hungary to Madrid.
