= Anna Fugger =

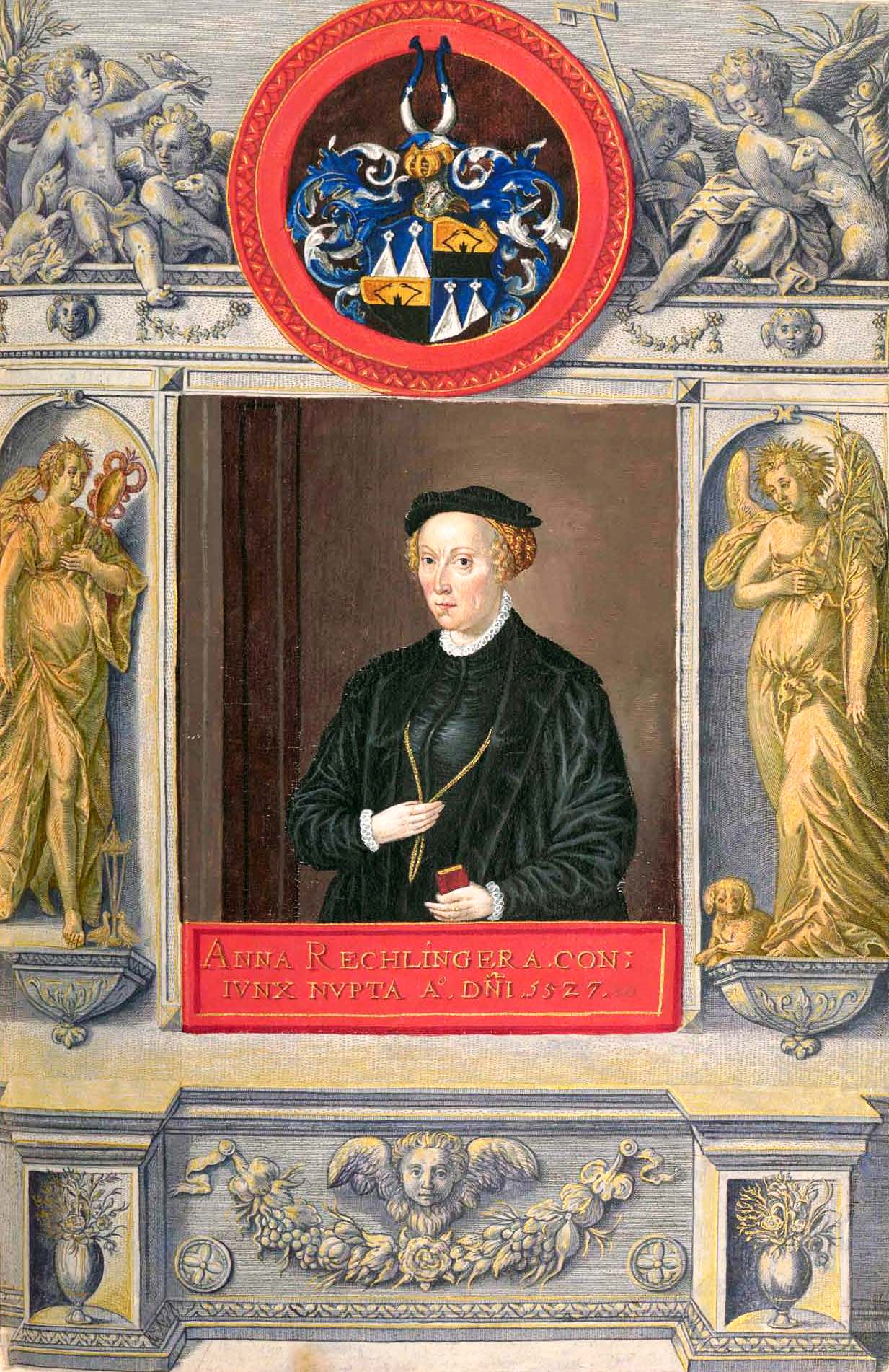
Anna Fugger, née Rehlinger von Horgau

Anna Fugger (née Anna Rehlinger von Horgau; 3 November 1505 - 25 March 1548) was a German patrician woman and wife of Anton Fugger (1493–1560), son of Georg Fugger (1453–1506).

== Life ==
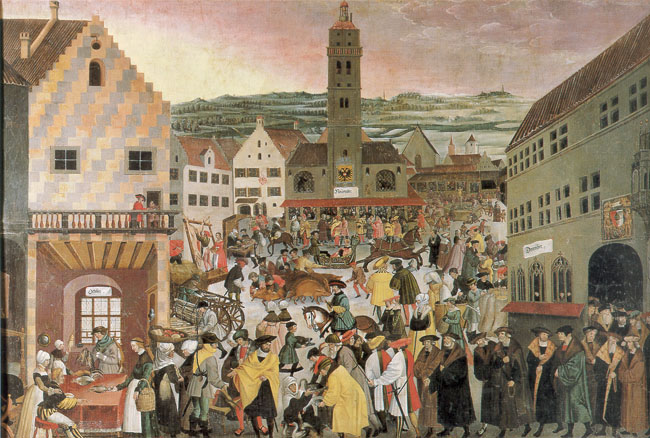
Anna Fugger in a sledge in October–December from the Augsburg Month Paintings series, copy by Heinrich Vogtherr the Younger.

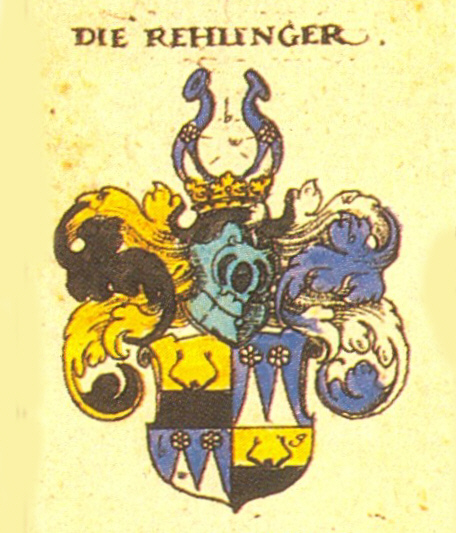
Coat of arms of the first line of the Rehlinger family.

She was born in Augsburg to Johann Rehlinger von Horgau (1483–1552) and Anna Dietenheim. The Rehlingers were among the most influential patrician families in Augsburg. On 25 February or 25 December 1527 she entered into a marriage contract with Fugger, with the wedding occurring on 3 March the same year. This made her the first patrician woman in the Fugger family and the matriarch of the so-called Antonius Line of the family. She died giving birth to her eleventh child aged 43 in Schwarz in Tirol and was buried in Babenhausen, Bavaria.

== In art ==
In 1523 her namesake Anna Rehlinger von Haltenberg was shown in Albrecht Dürer's Portrait of a Young Woman. Anna Rehlinger von Horgau herself is shown in a sledge bearing the Rehlinger coat of arms in the October–December work in the Augsburg Month Paintings series.

== Descendants ==
She and Fugger had four sons and six daughters:

- Marx (Markus) (1529–1597) ⚭ countess Sibylla von Eberstein (1531–1589)
- Anna (1530–1549)
- Hans (Johannes) (1531–1598) ⚭ Elisabeth Freiin Notthalfft von Weißenstein
- Catharina (1532–1585) ⚭ Jakob Count of Montfort
- Jeronimus (1533–1573)
- Regina (1537–1584) ⚭ Wolfgang Dietrich, Count zu Hardegg
- Susanna (1539–1588) ⚭ Balthasar Trautson, Freiherr of Matrai
- Jakob (1542–1598) ⚭ Anna Ilsung von Tratzberg
- Maria (1543–1583) ⚭ Michael von Eitzing
- Veronika (1545–1590) ⚭ Gaudenz zu Spaur

== Bibliography ==
- Martha Schad: Die Frauen des Hauses Fugger. 5. Auflage. Piper, München 2012, ISBN 978-3-492-23818-2 (in German)
- Mark Häberlein (2003). "Rehlinger". Neue Deutsche Biographie (in German). Vol. 21. Berlin: Duncker & Humblot. pp. 281–282. (full text online). (in German)
- Reinhard Hildebrandt (ed.): Quellen und Regesten zu den Augsburger Handelshäusern Paler und Rehlinger. Stuttgart; 1996. ISBN 978-3-51-506736-2. (in German)
