= Julie Waldburg-Wurzach =

Austrian composer (1841–1914)

Princess Julie Furstin von Waldburg-Wurzach (27 April 1841 – 7 December 1914) was an Austrian composer who published over 60 works for voice and/or piano. She was born in Vienna to Count Frans and Františka Dubský of Třebomyslice. In 1858, she married Eberhard, 4th Prince of Waldburg-Zeil-Wurzach, becoming his second wife. They had five daughters, including Countess Marie and Countess Elizabeth Sophie of Waldburg-Zeil-Wurzach.

One of Waldburg-Wurzach's teachers was pianist and composer Julie von Pfeilschifter, who lived with the family at Schloss Kißlegg in Württemberg in 1872, then moved with them to Salzburg in 1874. Franz Liszt reviewed Waldburg-Wurzach's compositions in at least one letter in 1874. He suggested a simpler notation for her "Mondlied"; edited the text of "Comme à Vingt Ans"; and noted that her song dedicated to Mme Ehnn, "Liebeshoffnung," "please[d] me particularly."

In addition to composing, Waldburg-Wurzach provided significant help to several people. In 1875, she used her social contacts at Cotta Verlag (today Klett-Cotta Verlag) to help her half-sister Marie von Ebner-Eschenbach begin publishing some of her writing, She visited Ferdinand von Zeppelin after he crashed his aircraft in Allgau, Germany, on 17 January 1906. In 1908, she helped organize a fundraiser and signed an ad in a Wiesbaden newspaper to raise money for her teacher Julie von Pfeilschifter.

Waldburg-Wurzach's music was published by Bosworth & Company and Carl Ruhle. Her compositions include:

== Piano ==
- Five Piano Keys for Small Hands, Op. 34
- Hochzeitsfanfare (march)
- Mitzi-polka
- Ohne Ende (polka-mazurka) Op. 15
- Sonnenblumenwalzer
- Tagesneuigkeiten, Op. 12 (polka)

== Vocal ==
- "Comme a vingt ans" Op. 32 (text by Emile Barateau)
- "Drie Lieder" Op. 31 (text by Heinrich Heine and Baron von Eschenbach)
- "Es faelit ein Stern herunter" Op. 26 (text by Heinrich Heine)
- "Es hat nicht sollen sein" Op. 50 (text by Joseph Victor von Scheffel)
- "Frau Nachtigall" Op. 25
- "Herbstklage" Op. 29 (text by Nikolaus Lenau)
- "Lass' mich vor dir niedersinken" Op. 48 (text by Barbara Elisabeth Gluck as Betty Paoli)
- "Lebe wohl" Op. 15
- "Lehn deine Wang' an meine Wang' " Op. 45 (text by Heinrich Heine)
- "Lieder Album" Op. 33 (text by Nikolaus Lenau; Eduard Morike; Hermann Oelschlager; Robert Reinick, and Emanuel von Geibel)
- "O du, vor dem die Stuerme schweigen" Op. 24
- "O Herz du musst dich fassen" Op. 23 (text by Robert Prutz)
- "Schilflied Auf dem Teich dem regungslosen" Op. 60
- "To the Moon" Op. 27
- "Ungarisches Lied" Op. 13
- "Verriet Mein blasses Angesicht" Op. 7 (text by Heinrich Heine)
