= Troubky-Zdislavice =

- Municipality
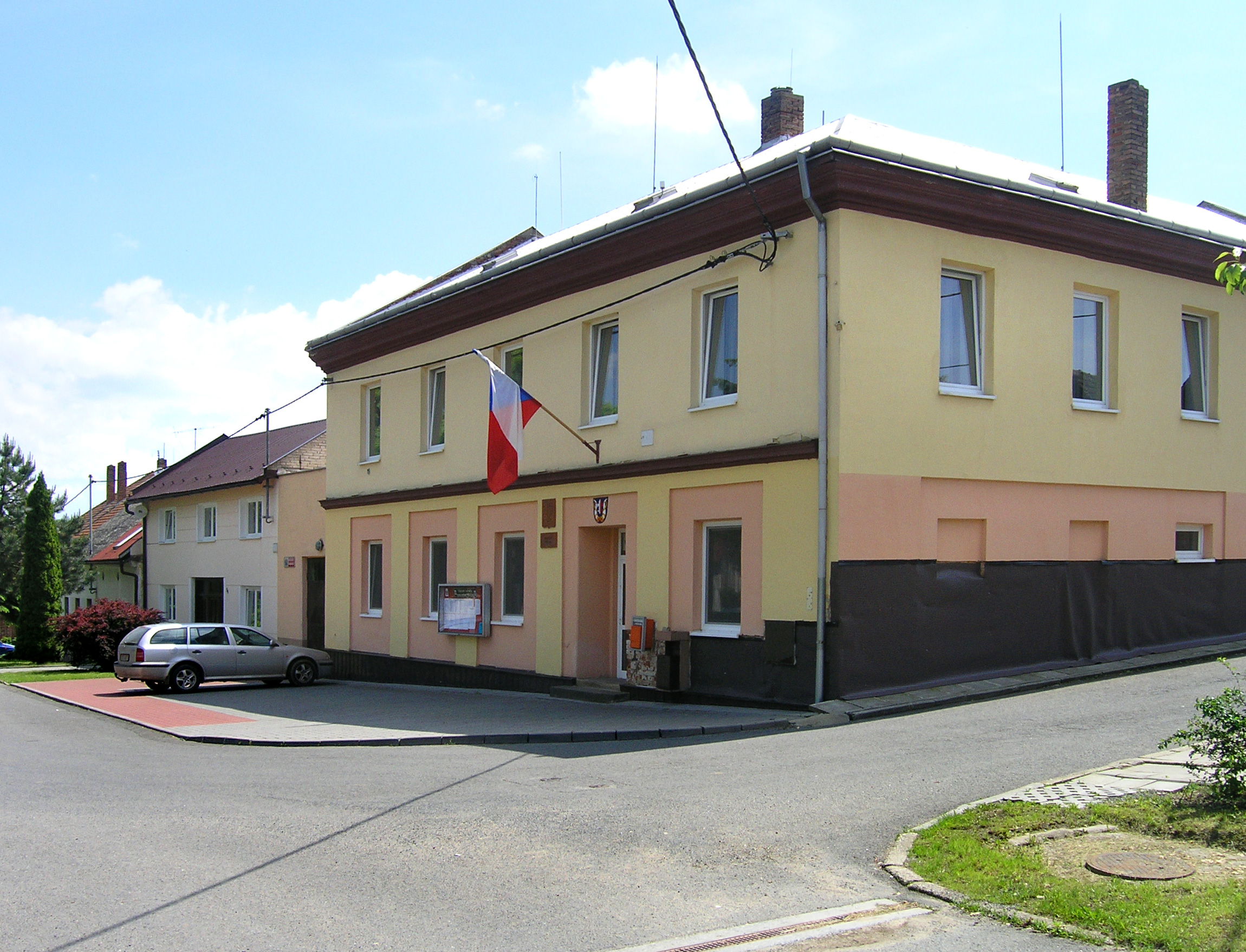
- Municipal office

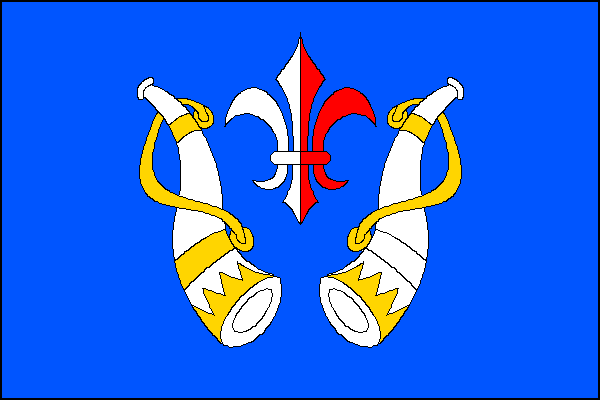
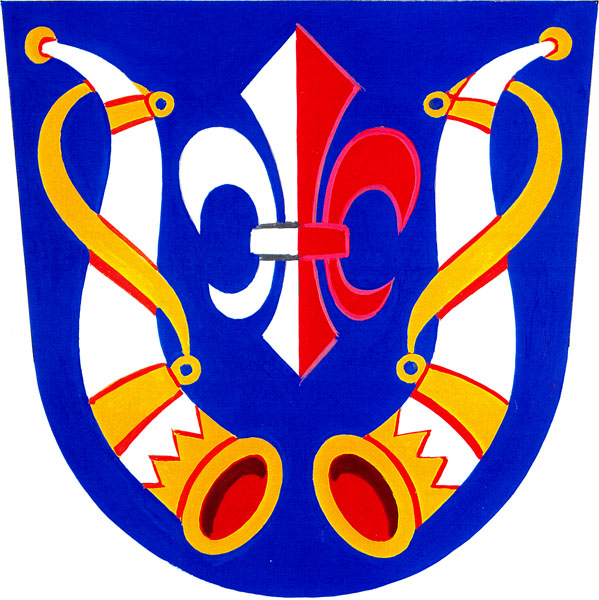
- Flag Coat of arms

- Location in the Czech Republic
- Coordinates: 49°13′48″N 17°16′8″E
- Country: Czech Republic
- Region: Zlín
- District: Kroměříž
- First mentioned: 1281

Area
  - Total: 10.60 km^{2} (4.09 sq mi)
- Elevation: 300 m (980 ft)

Population (2026-01-01)
  - Total: 420
  - Density: 40/km^{2} (100/sq mi)
- Time zone: UTC+1 (CET)
  - Summer (DST): UTC+2 (CEST)
- Postal code: 768 02
- Website: www.troubky-zdislavice.cz

Troubky-Zdislavice is a municipality in Kroměříž District in the Zlín Region of the Czech Republic. It has about 400 inhabitants.

== Administrative division ==
Troubky-Zdislavice consists of two municipal parts (in brackets population according to the 2021 census):

- Troubky (277)
- Zdislavice (139)

== Geography ==
Troubky-Zdislavice is located about 11 kilometres (7 mi) southwest of Kroměříž and 28 km (17 mi) west of Zlín. It lies in a hllia and mainly agricultural landscape in the Litenčice Hills. The highest point is at 416 metres (1,365 ft) above sea level. The Olšinka Stream flows through the municipality.

== History ==
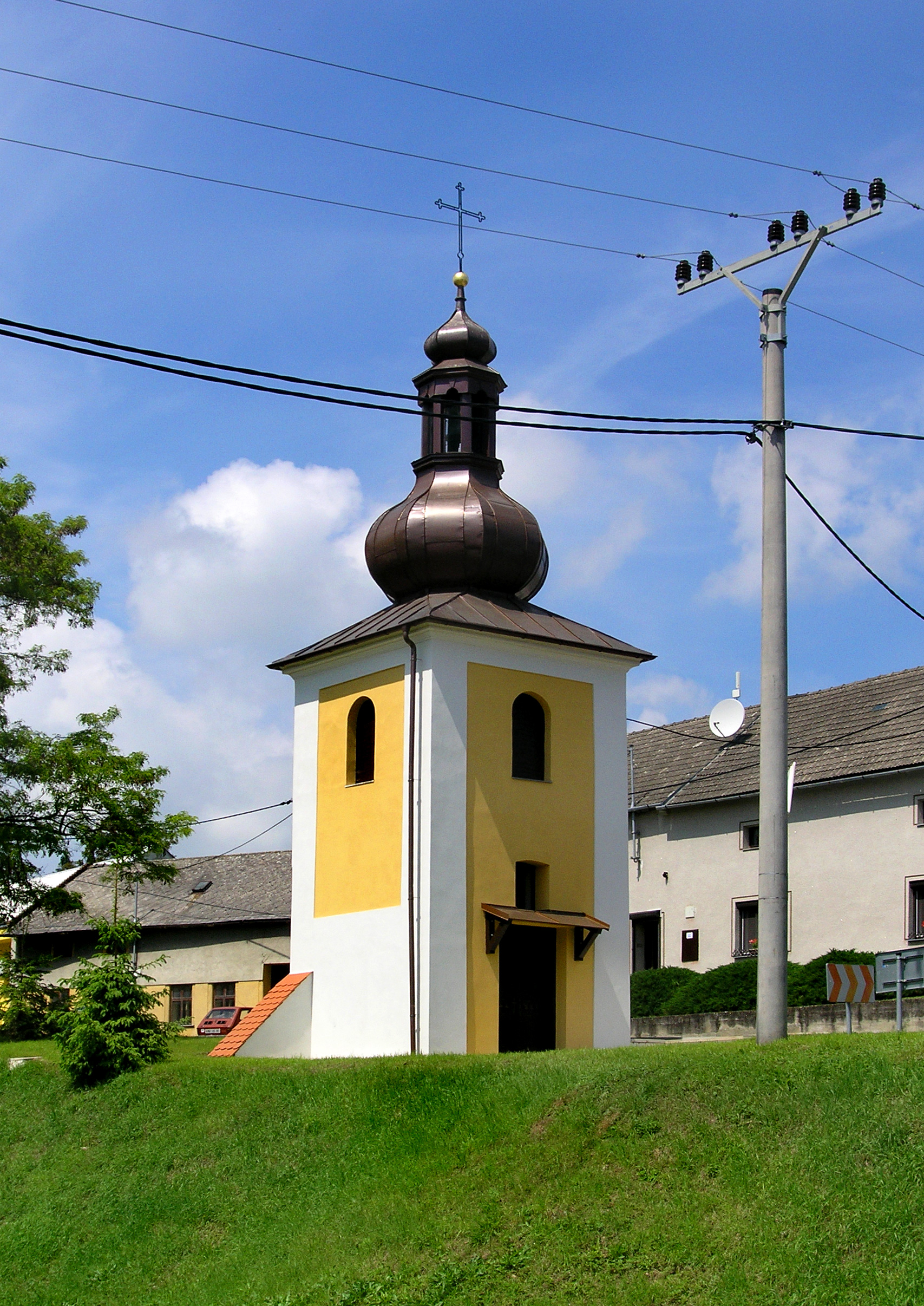
Belfry in Troubky

The first written mention of Troubky is from 1281 and of Zdislavice is from 1349. For centuries, Troubky was divided into two parts, one held by the local Lords of Zdounky and the second by the bishops of Olomouc. Zdislavice often changed owners and was held by a hundred of various lower nobles. The almost last of them and one of the most notable owners was the Dubský family.

The two villages have been either merged or unofficially administered together at several times in their history. The modern municipality was formed by the merger of the separate municipalities of Troubky and Zdislavice in 1960.

== Demographics ==
Historical population

Year	Pop.	±%
1869	1,059	—
1880	1,069	+0.9%
1890	957	−10.5%
1900	998	+4.3%
1910	996	−0.2%

Year	Pop.	±%
1921	985	−1.1%
1930	1,028	+4.4%
1950	806	−21.6%
1961	846	+5.0%
1970	810	−4.3%

Year	Pop.	±%
1980	718	−11.4%
1991	645	−10.2%
2001	497	−22.9%
2011	478	−3.8%
2021	416	−13.0%

Source: Censuses

== Transport ==
There are no railways or major roads passing through the municipality.

== Sights ==
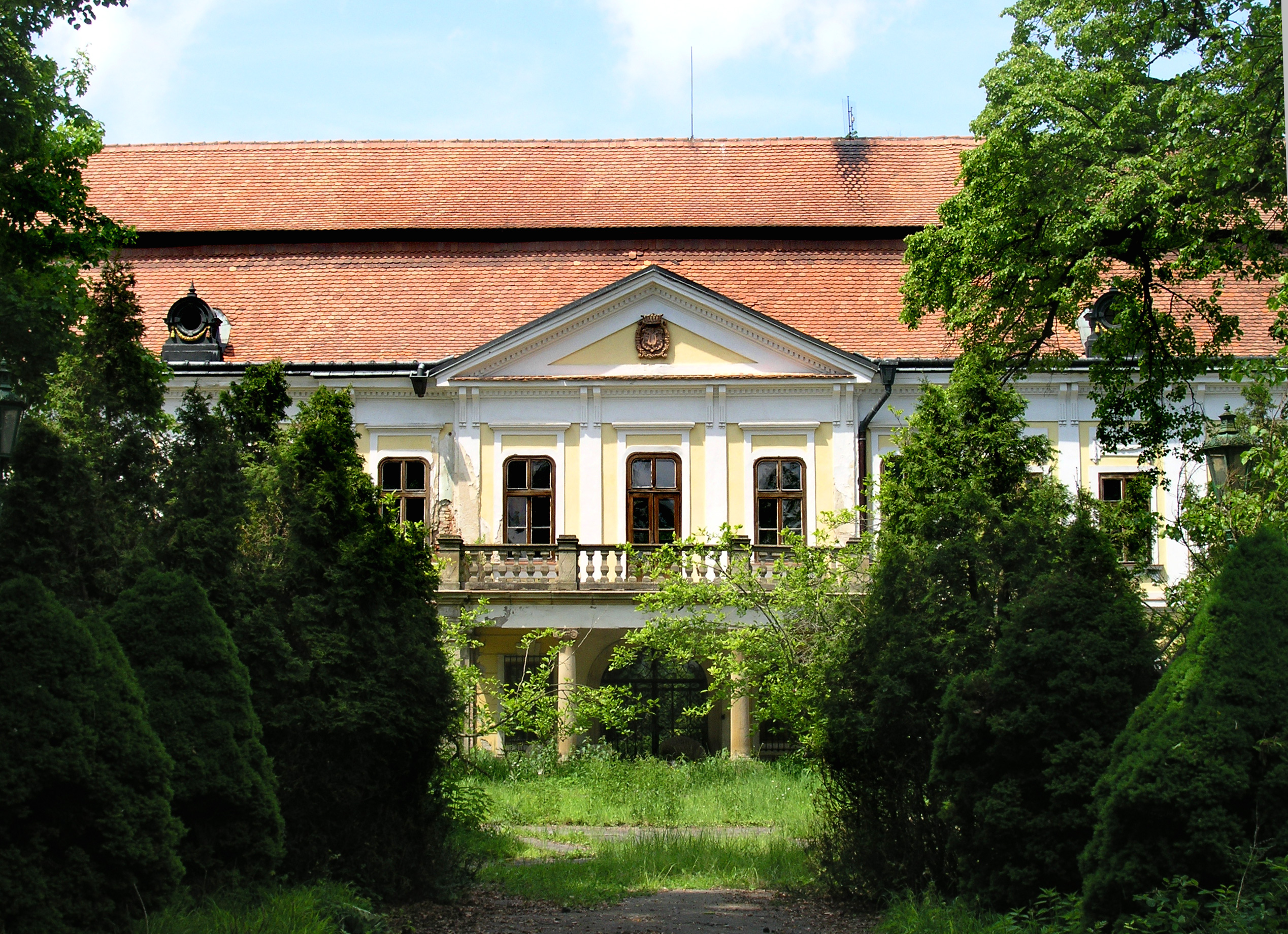
Zdislavice Castle

The Zdislavice Castle was built as a Baroque palace in the late 17th century on the site of a former stone fortress. In the 1840s, it was rebuilt to its current Empire style form by Count Dubský. The castle includes a park with the Dubský family tomb. The castle, which has been dilapidated for a long time, is today privately owned and gradually being repaired.

== In popular culture ==
The 1992 film Requiem pro panenku was shot here.

== Notable people ==
- Marie von Ebner-Eschenbach (1830–1916), Austrian writer
