= Waldburg-Wurzach =

Coordinates: 47°55′N 9°46′E

County (Principality) of Waldburg-Wurzach Grafschaft (Fürstentum) Waldburg-Wurzach
- 1674–1806
- Coat of arms
- Status: State of the Holy Roman Empire
- Capital: Wurzach
- Common languages: Alemannic German
- Government: Principality
- Historical era: Middle Ages
  - Partitioned from Waldburg-Zeil: 1674
  - Raised to principality: 1803
  - Mediatised to Kgdm Württemberg: 1806
Preceded by	Succeeded by
Waldburg-Zeil	Kingdom of Württemberg

Waldburg-Wurzach was a County and later Principality within Holy Roman Empire, ruled by the House of Waldburg, located on the southeastern border of Baden-Württemberg, Germany, located around Wurzach (located about 15 km (9 mi) west of Bad Waldsee). Waldburg-Wurzach was a partition of Waldburg-Zeil. Waldburg-Wurzach was a county prior to 1803, when it was raised to a principality shortly before being mediatised to Württemberg in 1806.

Prince Eberhard II was the senior of the entire House of Waldburg, which carried the title of Imperial Hereditary Oberhofmeister of the Kingdom of Württemberg. Upon his death in 1903, the Waldburg-Zeil-Wurzach line died out in the male line, after which Prince Wilhelm of Waldburg-Zeil-Trauchburg (1835–1906), also bore the title of Prince of Waldburg-Zeil-Trauchburg-Wurzach.

== Counts of Waldburg-Wurzach (1674–1803) ==
- Sebastian Wunibald (1674–1700)
  - Ernest James (1700–1734)
    - Francis Ernest (1734–1781)
      - Eberhard I (1781–1803), elevated to Reichsfürst 1803.

== Prince of Waldburg-Zeil-Wurzach (1803–06) ==
- Eberhard I, 1st Prince 1730–1807, mediatized 1806 (1803–1807)
  - Hereditary Count Leopold of Waldburg-Zeil-Wurzach 1769–1800
    - Leopold, 2nd Prince 1795–1861 (1807–1861)
      - Karl, 3rd Prince 1825–1907 resigned 1865 (1861–1865)
      - Eberhard II, 4th Prince 1828–1903 (1865–1903)
        - Countess Marie Eugenie Sophie 1857–1924, m. (1) Count Karl von Waldburg-Zeil-Syrgenstein; (2) Baron Karl Heidler von Egeregg
        - Countess Xaveria Maria Juliana 1860–1901, m. Count Sigismund von Attems
        - Countess Elisabeth Sophia Maria 1866–1950, m. Count Maximilian von Moy de Sons
