= Eberhard, 1st Prince of Waldburg-Zeil-Wurzach =

Eberhard I

Prince of Waldburg-Zeil-Wurzach
- Reign: 1803–1807 (mediatized in 1806)
- Predecessor: None
- Successor: Leopold
- Born: 20 December 1730
- Died: 23 September 1807 (aged 76)
- Spouse: Countess Maria Katharina Fugger von Glött (m. 1767; died 1796)
- Issue: Count Leopold von Waldburg-Zeil-Wurzach; Countess Maria Antonia von Waldburg-Zeil-Wurzach
- House: House of Waldburg
- Father: Count Francis Ernest von Waldburg-Wurzach
- Mother: Countess Maria Eleonora von Königsegg-Rothenfels

Eberhard, 1st Prince of Waldburg-Zeil-Wurzach (20 December 1730 – 23 September 1807) was a German prince.

== Early life ==
He was the son of Count Francis Ernest von Waldburg-Wurzach (1704–1781) and Countess Maria Eleonora von Königsegg-Rothenfels. Among his siblings were Countess Eleonore Wallburgis von Waldburg-Zeil-Wurzach (wife of Count Siegmund of Salm-Reifferscheidt-Bedburg); Countess Maria Karolina Antonia Johanna von Waldburg-Zeil-Wurzach (wife of Count Ferdinand Maria von Waldburg-Wolfegg); Countess Maria Crescentia von Waldburg-Zeil (wife of Count Franz Fidelis von Königsegg-Rothenfels); and Countess Maria Antonia von Waldburg-Zeil-Wurzach (wife of Count Johann Anton of Oettingen-Baldern-Katzenstein and Hermann, Prince of Hohenzollern-Hechingen).

His paternal grandparents were Count Ernest James von Waldburg-Wurzach and Anna Ludovika von Waldburg-Wolfegg. His maternal grandparents were Count Albrecht Eusebius von Königsegg-Rothenfels, and Klara Philippina von Manderscheid (a daughter of Count Salentin Ernst von Manderscheid-Blankenheim).

== Career ==
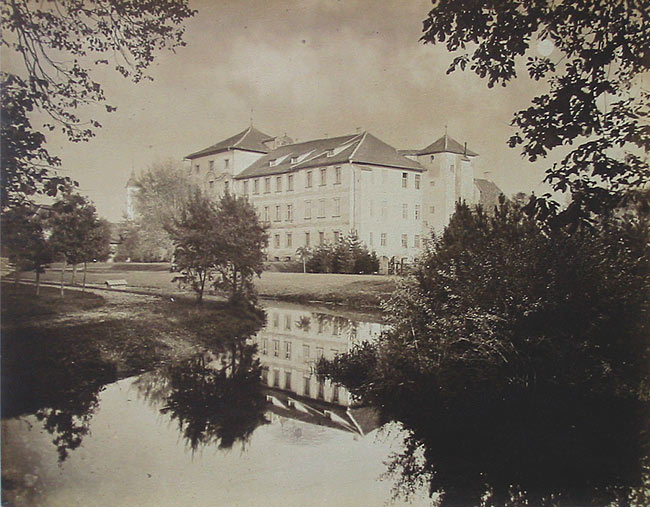
Wurzach Castle, 1870

Upon the death of his father in 1781, he succeeded as the 4th Count of Waldburg-Wurzach, a County located on the southeastern border of Baden-Württemberg, Germany, located around Wurzach. Waldburg-Wurzach had been partitioned from Waldburg-Zeil. In 1803, the County of Waldburg-Wurzach was raised to a Principality within Holy Roman Empire. Prince Eberhard's reign, however, was short-lived as the territory was mediatised to the Kingdom of Württemberg in 1806.

== Personal life ==
On 6 May 1767, then Count Waldburg was married to Countess Maria Katharina Fugger von Kirchberg-Weißenhorn (1744–1796), a daughter of Count Sebastian Fugger von Kirchberg-Glött, and Countess Elisabeth Aloisia Gabriele von Firmian. Together, they were the parents of:

- Hereditary Count Leopold von Waldburg-Zeil-Wurzach (1769–1800), who married Countess Maria Walburga Franziska Josepha Crescentia Aloysia Raphaela von Kirchberg-Weissenhorn.
- Countess Maria Antonia von Waldburg-Zeil-Wurzach (1774–1814), who married Anselm, 1st Prince Fugger von Babenhausen, the eldest son of Count Anselm Viktorian Fugger and Countess Maria Walburga von Waldburg-Wolfegg-Wolfegg.

His wife died in Wurzach on 4 April 1796. Prince Eberhard died on 23 September 1807. As he was predeceased by his only son, the title passed to his grandson, Leopold.

=== Descendants ===
Through his only son Leopold, he was a grandfather of Leopold, 2nd Prince of Waldburg-Zeil-Wurzach (1795–1861), who married his cousin, Countess Maria Josepha Fugger von Babenhausen (a daughter of Anselm, 1st Prince Fugger von Babenhausen).

Through his Maria Antonia, he was a grandfather of Countess Maria Josepha Fugger von Babenhausen (1798–1831), who married her cousin, Leopold, 2nd Prince of Waldburg-Zeil-Wurzach; and Anton, 2nd Prince Fugger von Babenhausen (1800–1836), who married Princess Franziska of Hohenlohe-Bartenstein-Jagtsberg (a daughter of Charles Joseph, 1st Prince of Hohenlohe-Jagstberg).
