= Marie von Ebner-Eschenbach =

Austrian writer (1830–1916)

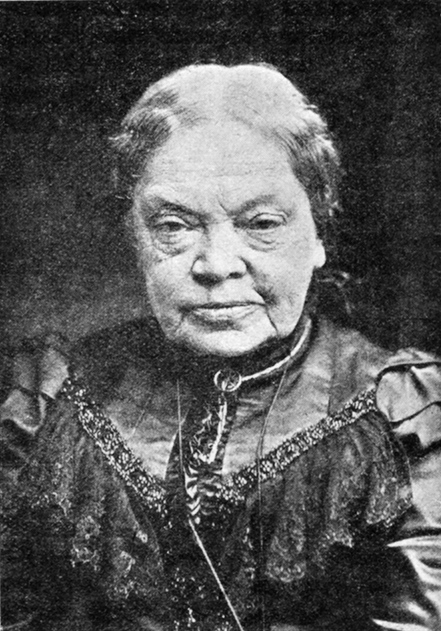
- Ebner-Eschenbach about 1900
- Born: Marie Dubský von Třebomyslice; 13 September 1830; Zdislavice Castle, Moravia, Austrian Empire
- Died: 12 March 1916 (aged 85); Vienna, Austria-Hungary
- Occupations: Novelist, short story writer, essayist
- Writing career
- Period: 1858–1909
- Genres: Drama, narrative, novel, novella, bildungsroman
- Notable works: Das Gemeindekind, Dorf- und Schlossgeschichten

Baroness Marie von Ebner-Eschenbach née Countess Dubsky (Czech: Marie von Ebner-Eschenbachová, German: Marie Freifrau von Ebner-Eschenbach; 13 September 1830 – 12 March 1916) was an Austrian writer and a noblewoman. Noted for her psychological novels, she is regarded as one of the most important German-language writers of the latter portion of the 19th century.

== Biography ==
=== Early life and family ===
She was born at the castle of the Dubský of Třebomyslice family in Zdislawitz near Kroměříž in Moravia (present Zdislavice in the Czech Republic), the daughter of Baron (from 1843: Count) Franz Joseph Dubský of Třebomyslice, a nobleman whose family roots are deeply Catholic and Bohemian, and his wife Maria Rosalia Therese, née Baroness von Vockel, who came from a noble Protestant-Saxon background.

Marie lost her mother in early infancy, but received a careful intellectual training from two stepmothers, first Baroness Eugenie von Bartenstein, and then her second step-mother, Countess Xaverine von Kolowrat-Krakowsky, who often contributed to her inspiration by taking her to the Burgtheater in Vienna periodically. Despite being part of a noble family, and having access to her family's vast libraries, she was never actually formally schooled. However, because of her curiosity, access to information, and educated family, she became auto-didact at a young age, and was taught fluent French, German, and Czech.

In 1848 she married her cousin, Moritz von Ebner-Eschenbach, a physics and chemistry professor at a Viennese engineering academy. Later on, he would become an Austrian captain, and promoted to lieutenant field marshal on his retirement. The couple resided first in Vienna, then, from 1850, at village Louka (Klosterbruck) near Znojmo (now part of the town), as the engineering academy had been relocated there, and after 1860 again in Vienna. The marriage was childless to disappointment of both of them. Marie grappled with the domestic tasks. She kept a journal and wrote letters explaining how she felt unsatisfied. It has been speculated that Marie may have suffered from "hysteria" including debilitating headaches and excessive nervousness.

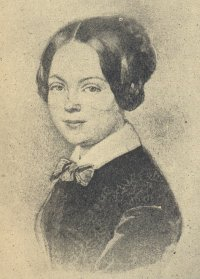
Marie von Ebner Eschenbach in 1840s

Marie is also rumored to have had a very close friendship that has been interpreted by some as a one sided romance with Marie von Najmajer on Najmajer's side.

=== Career and success ===
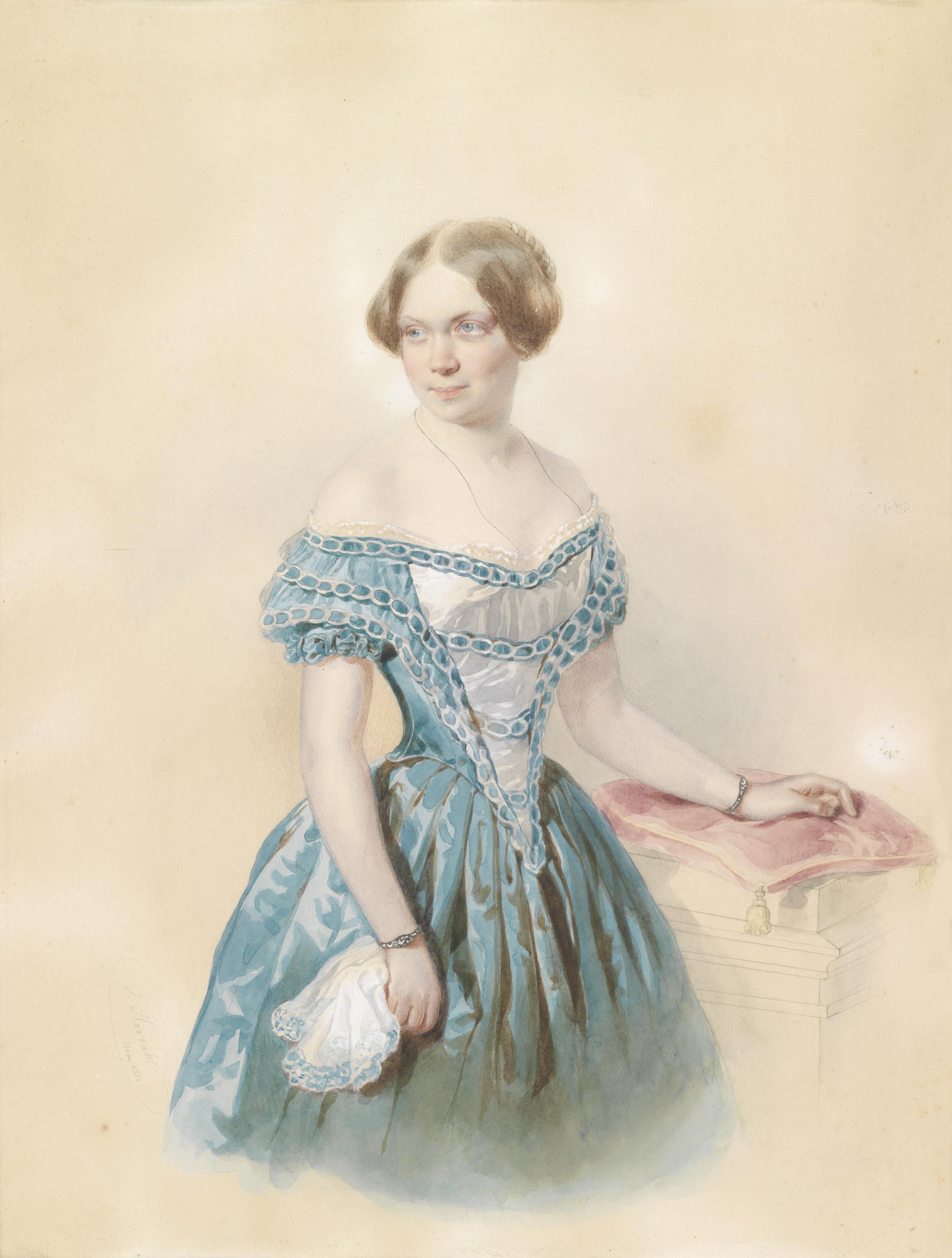
Marie von Ebner Eschenbach, 1851

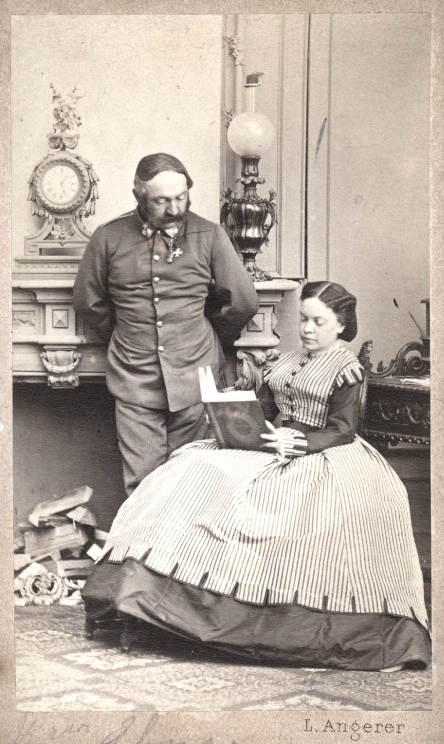
Marie von Ebner-Eschenbach with husband Moritz von Ebner-Eschenbach, c. 1865

Marie began devoting herself to literary work. In her endeavours she received assistance and encouragement from Franz Grillparzer and Freiherr von Münch-Bellinghausen. Her first publicized work was the drama Maria Stuart in Scotland (German: Maria Stuart in Schottland), which Philipp Eduard Devrient produced at the Karlsruhe theatre in 1860. Then came a tragedy in five acts, Marie Roland, with several one-act dramas: Doktor Ritter, Violets (German: Das Veilchen), and The Disconsolate One. Though she was encouraged to keep writing, her relative failure in the field of playwriting had actually become somewhat of a point of an embarrassment to her family.

After these limited successes in the field of drama, she turned to narrative. Commencing with Die Prinzessin von Banalien (1872), she graphically depicts in Božena (Stuttgart, 1876, 4th ed. 1899) and Das Gemeindekind (Berlin, 1887, 4th ed. 1900) the surroundings of her Moravian home, and in Lotti, die Uhrmacherin (Berlin, 1883, 4th ed. 1900), Zwei Comtessen (Berlin, 1885, 5th ed. 1898), Unsühnbar (1890, 5th ed. 1900) and Glaubenslos? (1893) the life of the Austrian aristocracy in town and country.

Much of Ebner-Eschenbach's more mainstream success is accredited to Julius Rodenberg due to his publishing Ebner-Eschenbach's work in his popular periodical, Die Deutsche Rundschau. In 1875, her half-sister, composer Julie Waldburg-Wurzach, used her social contacts at Cotta Verlag (today Klett-Cotta Verlag) to market some of Ebner-Eschenbach's work. Ebner-Eschenbach also published Neue Erzählungen (Berlin, 1881, 3rd ed. 1894), Aphorismen (Berlin, 1880, 4th ed. 1895) and Parabeln, Märchen und Gedichte (2nd ed., Berlin, 1892). Von Ebner-Eschenbach's elegance of style, her incisive wit and masterly depiction of character give her a foremost place among the German women writers of her time. On the occasion of her 70th birthday the University of Vienna conferred upon her the degree of doctor of philosophy, honoris causa. An edition of Marie von Ebner-Eschenbach's Gesammelte Schriften (Collected Works) began to appear in 1893 (Berlin).

Throughout her life, she had never created literature or plays for monetary reasons, and so, in her will, she left, as to aid other writers in their own endeavors, the compensation she had received. She died in Vienna, Austria-Hungary.

The Marie Ebner-Eschenbach park in Währing, Vienna, is named after her.

== Works ==
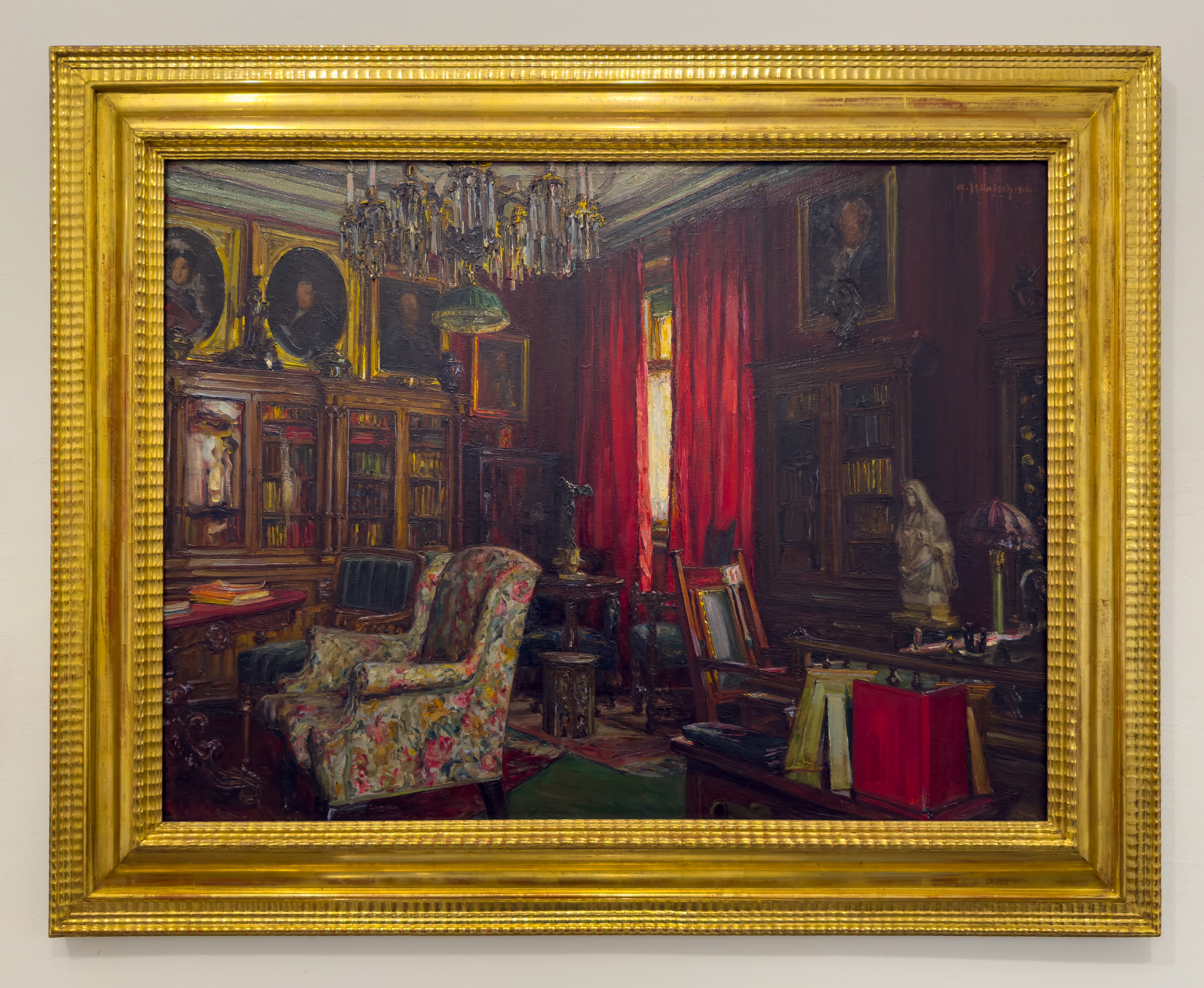
Marie's study, painted by Alois Hänisch in 1916, at the Clock museum, Vienna

- Aus Franzensbad. 6 Episteln von keinem Propheten (6 epistles from no prophet). Leipzig: Lorck, 1858
- Maria Stuart in Schottland. Drama in five acts. Vienna: Ludwig Mayer, 1860
- Das Veilchen (The Violet). Comedy in one act. Vienna: Wallishausser, 1861
- Marie Roland. Tragedy in five acts. Vienna: Wallishausser, 1867
- Doktor Ritter. Dramatic poem in one act. Vienna: Jasper, 1869
- Die Prinzessin von Banalien. A fairy tale. Vienna: Rosner, 1872
- Das Waldfräulein (Maid of the woods), 1873
- Božena. A story. Stuttgart: Cotta, 1876
- Die Freiherren von Gemperlein, 1878
- Lotti, die Uhrmacherin (Lotti, the clock maker), in: Deutsche Rundschau, 1880
- Aphorismen. Berlin: Franz Ebhardt, 1880
- Dorf- und Schloßgeschichten (Village and castle stories), 1883 (containing Der Kreisphysikus, Jacob Szela, Krambambuli, Die Resel, Die Poesie des Unbewußten)
- Zwei Comtessen (Two countesses). A story. Berlin: Franz Ebhardt, 1885
- Neue Dorf- und Schloßgeschichten (New village and castle stories). Stories. Berlin: Paetel, 1886 (containing Die Unverstandene auf dem Dorfe, Er laßt die Hand küssen, Der gute Mond)
- Das Gemeindekind (Child of the neighborhood) Novel. 1887
- Unsühnbar. A story. Berlin: Paetel, 1890
- Drei Novellen (Three novellas). 1892 (containing Oversberg)
- Glaubenslos? A story. Berlin: Paetel, 1893
- Das Schädliche. Die Totenwacht. Two stories. Berlin: Paetel, 1894
- Rittmeister Brand. Bertram Vogelweid. Two stories. Berlin: Paetel, 1896
- Alte Schule (Old school) A story. Berlin: Paetel, 1897 (containing Ein Verbot, Der Fink, Eine Vision, Schattenleben, Verschollen)
- Am Ende. Scene in one act. Berlin: Bloch, 1897
- Aus Spätherbsttagen. Stories. Berlin: Paetel, 1901 (containing Der Vorzugsschüler, Maslans Frau, Fräulein Susannens Weihnachtsabend, Uneröffnet zu verbrennen, Die Reisegefährten, Die Spitzin, In letzter Stunde, Ein Original, Die Visite)
- Agave. Novel. Berlin: Paetel, 1903
- Die unbesiegbare Macht. Two stories. Berlin: Paetel, 1905
- Meine Kinderjahre (My childhood years). Autobiographical sketches. Berlin: Paetel, 1906
- Altweibersommer. Berlin: Paetel, 1909

== See also ==
- List of Austrian writers

== Sources ==
- Rines, George Edwin, ed. (1920). "Ebner-Eschenbach, Barones Marie von" . Encyclopedia Americana.
- This work in turn cites:
  - A. Bettelheim, Marie von Ebner-Eschenbach: Biographische Blätter (Berlin, 1900)
  - M. Necker, Marie von Ebner-Eschenbach, nach ihren Werken geschildert (Berlin, 1900)
