= Swabian College of Imperial Counts =

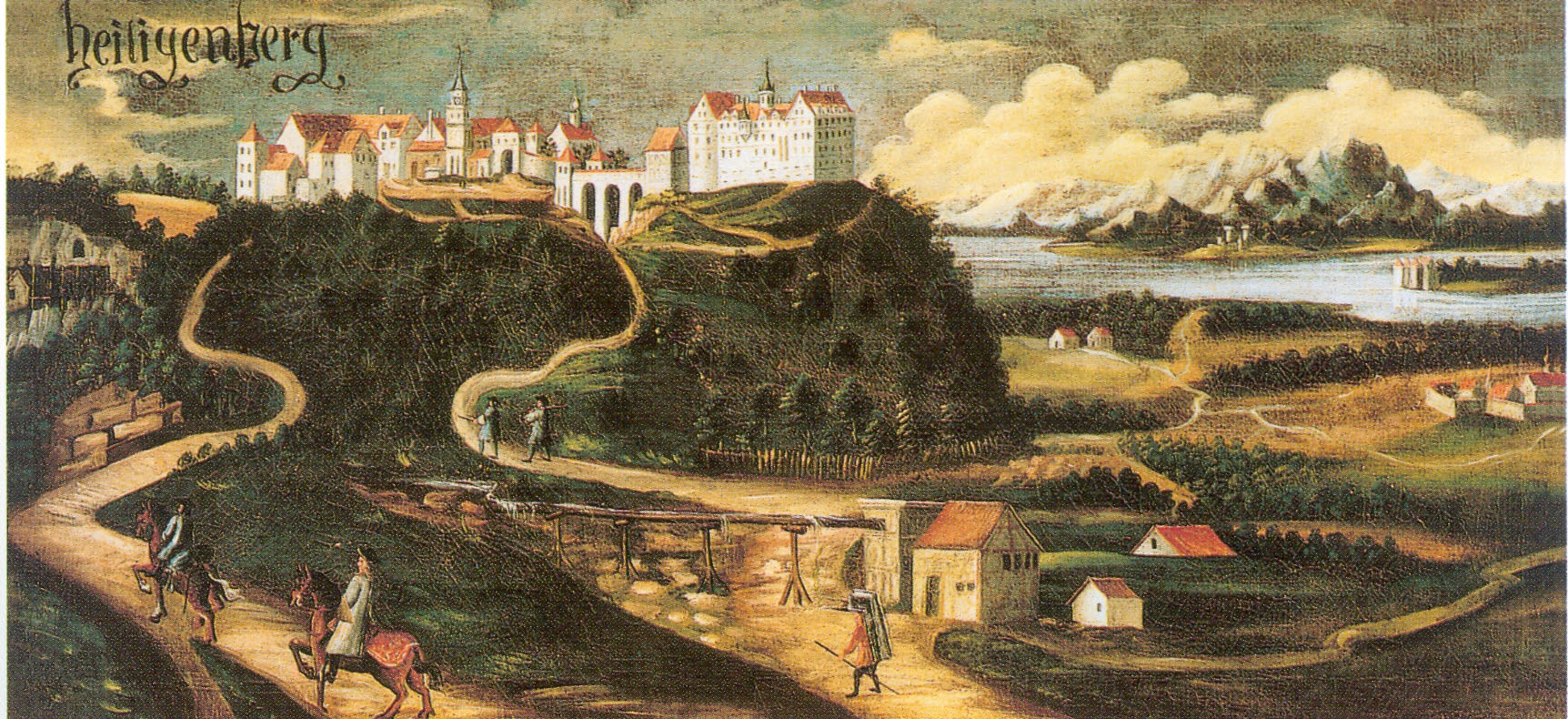
The Count of Heiligenberg (from the House of Fürstenberg) took the place of honour in the Swabian Imperial College.

The Swabian College of Imperial Counts (German: schwäbisches Reichsgrafenkollegium or schwäbische Reichsgrafenbank) was the gathering of the Imperial Counts and Imperial Lords of Swabia to safeguard their interests in the Imperial Diet, especially at its Imperial Council and in the Circle of Swabia.

== History ==
The College was a development of various earlier bodies in the area, such as the 1407 Sankt Jörgenschild 'Knights' Society' (Rittergesellschaft) and the 1488 Swabian League. At the end of the 15th century, a College of Imperial Counts was a body intended to represent the interests of nobles of the status of count and below in the Holy Roman Empire. Initially Swabia was covered by the Wetterau College of Imperial Counts, since from 1495 Wetterau and Swabia both laid claim to a single vote at the Imperial Diet. It took until 1524 for the Holy Roman Emperor to firmly commit to a curial vote for the Imperial Counts of Swabia.

The Imperial Counts of Swabia had a permanent delegation to the Diet from 1549 onwards - their envoys also represented the Frankish Imperial Counts until 1641, when they formed their own College of Imperial Counts. In 1579 the Wetterau and Swabian Colleges created the Dinkelsbühler Union, by which they internally resolved disputes between them without resorting to war and supported each other against other imperial estates.

The Swabian College held regular meetings from 1533 onwards, but these were interrupted between 1630 and 1645 by the Thirty Years' War. The Colleges and Union were both dissolved along with the Empire itself in 1806.

== Organisation ==
It was headed by two directors, known as 'Grafenhauptmänner'. Below them were adjuncts as well as other officials. Without their consent no council of counts could be summoned and the directors had to seek their advice on important issues. Together with a syndic, these officials and the directors formed the Collegiate Council. All of the officials were elected for an unlimited term and later for life.

As a rule, the College's meetings took place at the same time as those of the Circle of Swabia. The heads of the member territories had the right to vote, but when a line went extinct it lost its voting rights. Initially the counts had to attend in person, but later they were allowed to send representatives. Only a simple majority was needed until 1613, when it was changed to a two-thirds majority.

Directly holding an Imperial County was usually a prerequisite of membership, though from the mid 16th century onwards there were exceptions, such as 'realists' (i.e. those who held a territory actually but not directly), 'personalists' (those who had the status but not the territory) and those who had temporarily or permanently renounced possession of a territory. The College formed the 'Grafenbank' in the Swabian Circle Assembly, number 98 in the ordering of the Reichsfürstenrat. All its members (except Baden, added in 1747) were Catholics and so all belonged to the Corpus Catholicorum within the Diet.

== Bibliography (in German) ==
- Gerhard Köbler: Historisches Lexikon der deutschen Länder. Die deutschen Territorien vom Mittelalter bis zur Gegenwart. 4. vollständig überarbeitete Auflage. Beck, München 1992, ISBN 3-406-35865-9, S. 569.
- Wilfried Beutter: Schwäbisches Reichsgrafenkollegium. In: Gerhard Taddey: Lexikon der deutschen Geschichte. Personen, Ereignisse, Institutionen. Von der Zeitwende bis zum Ausgang des 2. Weltkrieges. 2. überarbeitete Auflage. Kröner, Stuttgart 1982, ISBN 3-520-81302-5, S. 1129.
- Nikolaus Schönburg: Die verfassungsrechtliche Stellung des Reichsgrafenstandes vom Ausgang des Mittelalters bis zum Ende des Alten Reiches. Magisterarbeit, Wien 2008, S. 99ff., Digitalisat (PDF; 893 kB).
