= Sirgenstein Castle =

Coordinates: 48°23′15″N 9°45′37″E

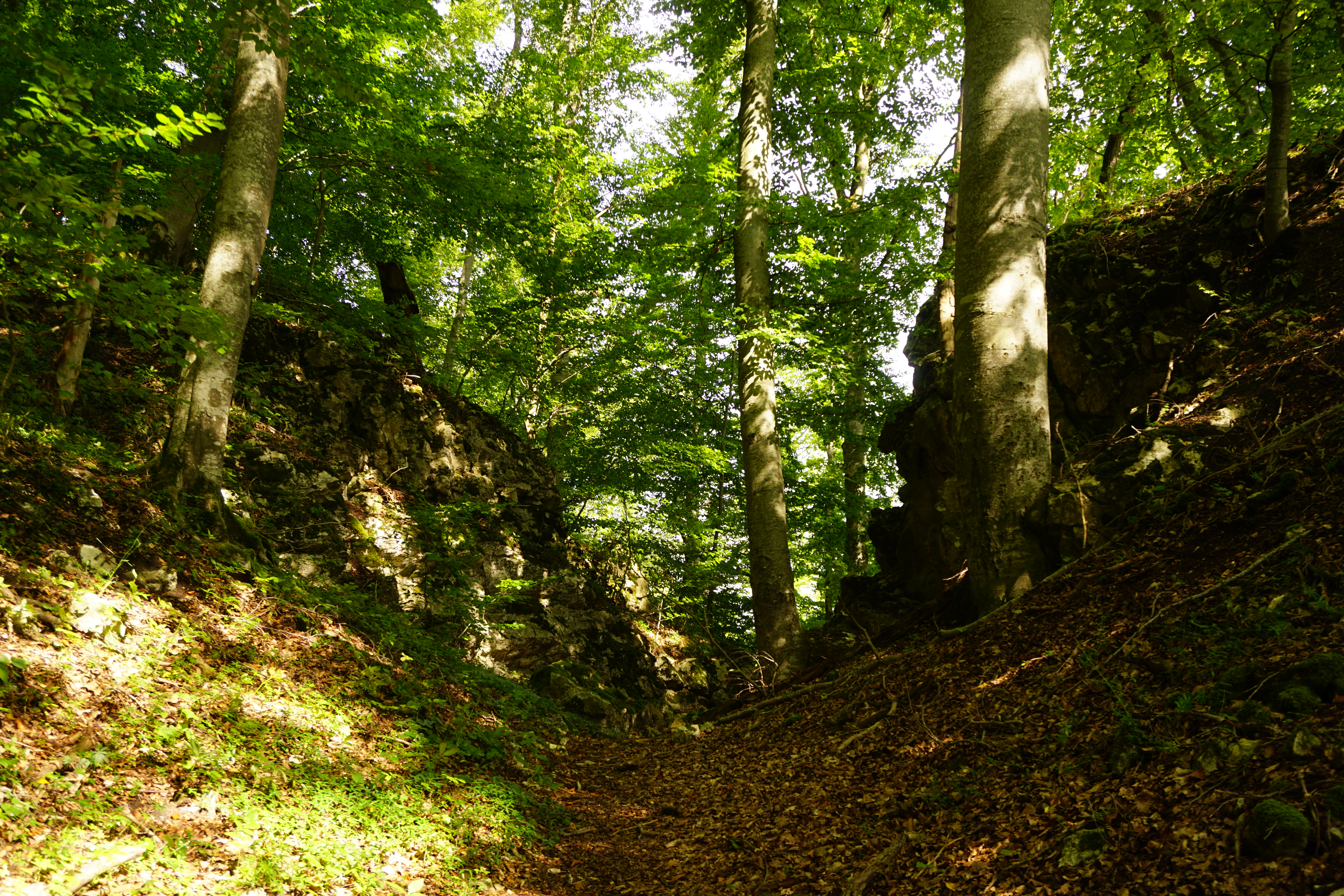
Castle moat from the west

Sirgenstein Castle (German: Burgrest Sirgenstein) is a ruined castle on rock, over twenty metres high, with a cave inhabited in the Stone Age, the Sirgenstein, between the town of Blaubeuren and hamlet of Schelklingen in Alb-Donau-Kreis in Baden-Württemberg.

The rock castle was probably built in the 13th century. Today its visible remains include castle walls, rusticated ashlar blocks and a neck ditch.

== Literature ==
- Krahe, Friedrich-Wilhelm:castles in medieval Germany: Plan-lexicon. Würzburg: Verlag Flechsig, 2000 (ISBN 3-88189-360-1).
- Schmitt, Gunter:Sirgenstein. In the same author:Castle Guide Swabian Alb. Volume 2: Alb mid-South. Explore hiking and between Sigmaringen and Ulm. Biberach an der Riss: Biberach printing house, 1989, p. 75-78 (ISBN 3-924489-45-9).
- Uhl, Stefan:CastlesSchelklingen Schelklingen. City Archives, 1991 (Schelklingen books, 18).

== See also ==
- List of castles in Baden-Württemberg
